= F1 (disambiguation) =

F1 usually refers to Formula One, the highest class of auto racing sanctioned by the FIA.

F1, F01, F.I, F.1 or F-1 may also refer to:

== Military craft and weapons ==
- F1 grenade (disambiguation), several types of hand grenade
- F 1 Hässlö, a former Swedish Air Force wing
- F1 SMG, an Australian submachine gun
- Dassault Mirage F1, a French combat aircraft
- FCM F1, a 1940 French super-heavy tank
- Fokker F.I, a German fighter triplane
- HMS F1, an F-class submarine of the Royal Navy, launched in 1915
- HMS Kelly (F01), a 1938 British Royal Navy K-class destroyer
- Italian submarine F1, an Italian Regia Marina (Royal Navy) submarine in commission from 1916 to 1930
- Kampfgeschwader 76, from its historic Geschwaderkennung code with the Luftwaffe in World War II
- Mitsubishi F-1, a fighter/attack aircraft of the Japan Air Self-Defense Force
- North American F-1 Fury, the FJ known as the F-1 from 1962 onward
- Sopwith Camel F.1, a 1916 British World War I single-seat fighter biplane
- USS F-1 (SS-20), an F-class submarine of the United States Navy
- Felixstowe F.1, a Seaplane Experimental Station-designed flying boat
- Fokker F.I (1919), an abortive design that served for the 1916 Fokker F.II airliner construction
- Avion MAI F-1, a sporting biplane
- FR F1, a French precision rifle

== Science and technology ==
=== Computing ===
- F1, a function key on a computer keyboard
- F1, an Office Assistant in Microsoft Office
- F1 Magazine, a Syrian monthly computer magazine published in Arabic
- Google F1, Google's SQL database management system (DBMS)
- Oppo F1, a 2016 smartphone by Oppo Electronics
- POCO F1, a 2018 smartphone by Poco (smartphone)

=== Science ===
- F-1 cubesat, a picosatellite developed in Vietnam
- F1 hybrid, a first-generation hybrid (or crossbreed) animal or plant
- F1-isoprostane, a type of isoprostane
- F_{1} layer, a layer of the ionosphere
- F1 score, a statistical performance measure of a test or classifier
- Vascular dementia's ICD-10 code
- F1, a tornado intensity rating on the Fujita scale
- f_{1}, the formant with the lowest frequency in acoustics and phonetics
- F-1 (nuclear reactor), the oldest operating research reactor
- NIST-F1, a cesium fountain clock and the United States' primary time and frequency standard
- F_{1}, the field with one element

=== Transport ===
- BMW F01, an automobile platform
- BYD F0 or BYD F1, a car manufactured by BYD Auto
- F1, the project codename and development designation of the first Lexus vehicle
- Ford F-Series, includes the F-1 pickup truck
- Finnish Steam Locomotive Class F1
- F-01 (Michigan county highway)
- F1 Taksim–Kabataş funicular line, a railway line in Istanbul, Turkey
- McLaren F1, a sports car
- NCC Class F1, a Northern Counties Committee Irish steam locomotive
- Rocketdyne F-1 rocket engine
- SECR F1 Class, a South Eastern and Chatham Railway, British steam locomotive
- SP&S Class F-1, an American steam locomotive class, of the Spokane, Portland and Seattle 700
- SpaceX Falcon 1 space launch rocket
- Manly ferry service in Sydney, Australia known as the F1

=== Other ===
- F1 helmet, a French firefighting helmet
- Canon F-1, a 1971 35 mm single-lens reflex camera

== Sports and entertainment ==
- F1 (classification), a wheelchair sport classification
- F1 Powerboat Racing
- Formula One (disambiguation)
- F1 Racing, a Formula One magazine
- F1 (film), 2025 American sports racing film starring Brad Pitt

=== Gaming ===
- F-1 (arcade game), a 1976 electro-mechanical game by Namco
- F1 (video game), a 1993 multiformat game by Domark/Tengen
- F1 (video game series), a racing video game franchise

== Other uses ==
- F-1 visa, a visa category to enter United States as a student
- Foundation Year 1, the first year of the UK Foundation Programme for postgraduate medical practitioners
- f^{1}, Family 1, a group of Greek gospel manuscripts

== See also ==
- 1F (disambiguation)
