= Mk 2 grenade =

Mk 2 Grenade
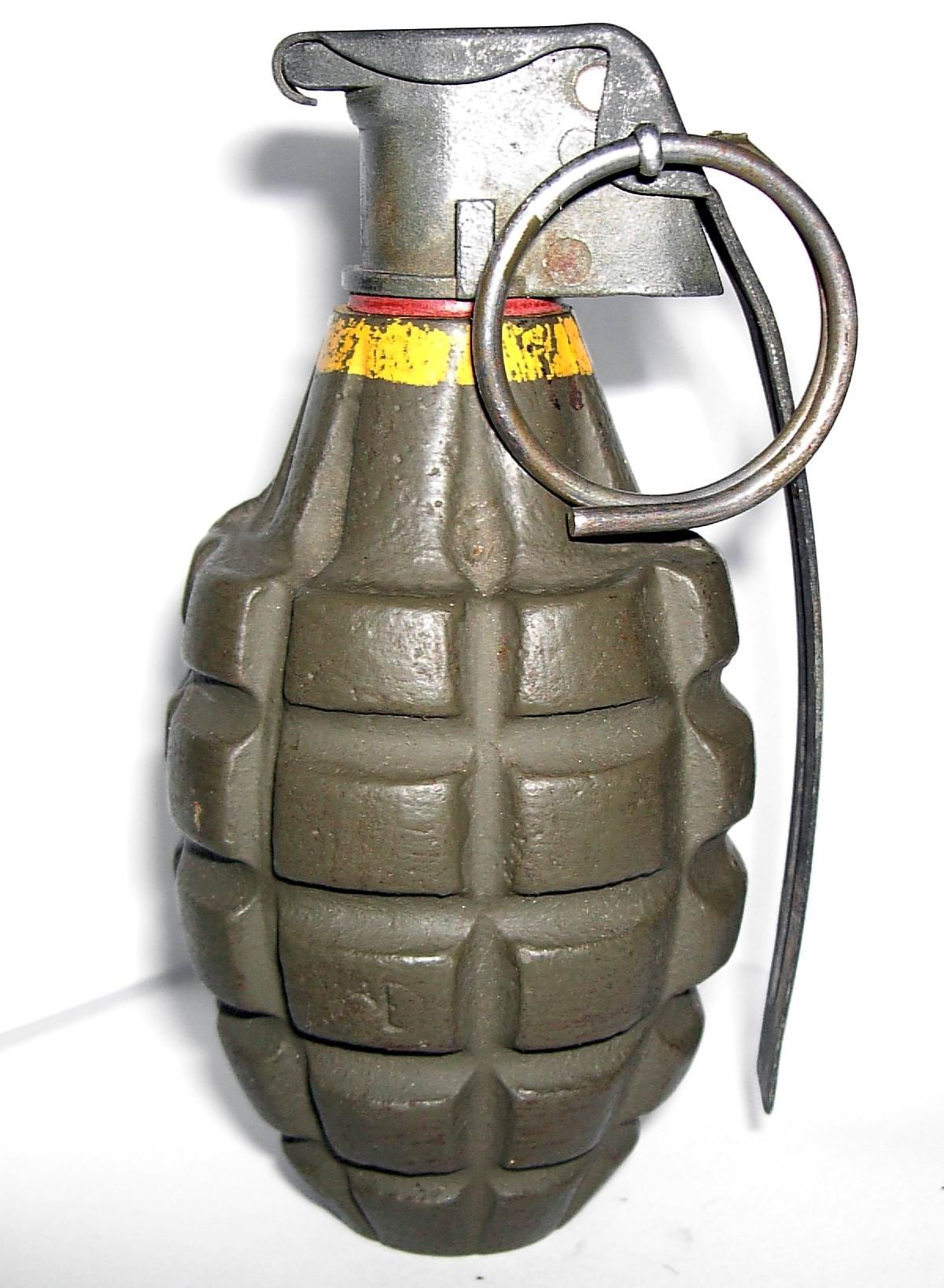
- World War II–era Mk 2 grenade
- Type: Time-fused grenade
- Place of origin: United States

Service history
- In service: 1918–1969
- Used by: See Users
- Wars: World War II; Chinese Civil War; Korean War; First Indochina War; Suez Crisis; Vietnam War; Six-Day War; Cambodian Civil War; Laotian Civil War; Rhodesian Bush War; Lebanese Civil War; The Troubles; Salvadoran Civil War; Iraqi Civil War (2014–2017); Communist rebellion in the Philippines

Production history
- Designed: 1918
- Produced: 1918–1950s

Specifications
- Mass: About 1 lb 5 oz (600 g) depending upon filling
- Length: 3.5 inches (89 mm) body 4.5 inches (110 mm) overall
- Diameter: 2.3 inches (58 mm)
- Filling: Varied
- Filling weight: Varied
- Detonation mechanism: percussion cap & time fuse: 4–5 second delay

The Mk 2 grenade (initially known as the Mk II) is a fragmentation-type anti-personnel hand grenade introduced by the United States Armed Forces in 1918.

== History ==
The Mk 2 was formally standardized in 1920. It was the standard issue anti-personnel grenade used during World War II, and also saw limited service in later conflicts, including the Korean War and Vietnam War. Replacing the failed Mk 1 grenade of 1917, it was redesignated the Mk 2 on 2 April 1945.

The Mk 2 was gradually phased out of service as the M26-series (M26/M61/M57) grenade was introduced during the Korean War. Due to the tremendous quantity manufactured during World War II the Mk 2 was still in limited issue with the US Army and US Marine Corps throughout the 1950s and 1960s.

The U.S. Navy was one of the last users of the Mk 2 when it was finally withdrawn from U.S. military service in 1969, replaced with the M33 series (M33/M67).

== Design ==
The Mk 2, like the Mk 1, was manufactured of cast iron with a grooved surface divided into 40 knobs in five rows of eight columns.

This was intended to enhance fragmentation (in practice, it was found that the grooves did not enhance fragmentation as much as desired) and provide a better grip when handling and throwing the grenade.

The grooves and knobs gave it the appearance of a pineapple, and are the origin of the nickname. It was also commonly referred to as a "frag" grenade, in contrast to other types of grenades such as the Mk 3 concussion grenade also developed during World War I.

The version of the Mk 2 in use around 1969, weighed 595 grams, had 57 grams of flaked TNT, and can be thrown at least 30 m (98 feet). A 10 meter "effective causality" distance is listed, but this is likely a typo.

=== Fuses ===
The Mk 2 used the M5, M6, M10, M11, or M204 series fuses.

The early M5, and the later M6 and M204 series detonating fuses, were used on high explosive-filled grenades. The M10 and M11 series igniting fuses were used on low explosive-filled ones.

The early fuses had many problems. In the M5, moisture could get in under the foil fuse cap, causing the weapon to fail to detonate. The early fuses were not completely silent and made a loud "bang" and produced sparks when activated. They also made a faint "hissing" sound while burning, potentially alerting the enemy of their presence.

The M10, used during the interwar period, and the M10A1, used early in WWII, sometimes prematurely detonated when the flash from the primer hit the explosive charge rather than the delay fuse. They were replaced by the M10A2 and M10A3. A less common type of igniting fuse was the M11.

The M6A4C had a delay of 4 seconds. The M5 and M11, like the M10, M10A1 and M10A2, had a delay of 4 to 5 seconds. The later M10A3 had a delay of 4.5 to 5.3 seconds. In 1944, the M6A4C was replaced by the silent and more reliable 4 to 5-second delay M204 or M204A1 fuse.

Due to the large number of grenades already issued, few grenades with the new fuses were used in combat during WWII.

=== Fillings ===
The original Mk 2 grenade had a 3/8-inch (9.5 mm) threaded plug in its base, which covered the opening used to place the explosive filling, either 1.85 oz (52 g) of TNT, 2.33 oz (66 g) of Trojan explosive (a mixture of 40% nitrostarch, ammonium nitrate, and sodium nitrate), 1.85 oz (52 g) of a 50/50 amatol/nitrostarch mixture, or 1.85 oz (52 g) of Grenite (a mixture of 95% nitrostarch and binders). Some early Mk 2 grenades were filled with 0.74 oz (21 g) of smokeless EC powder. The improved "Mk 2A1" introduced in 1942 was filled through the fuse well instead. The Mk 2A1 was initially filled with 0.74 oz (21 g) of EC powder. In 1944, the EC powder filling was replaced with 1.85 oz (52 g) of TNT.

Low explosive-filled Mk 2s had their cast iron bodies painted gray or black to prevent rust. Pre-WWII high explosive-filled Mk 2s were painted bright yellow. During wartime (from about 1943 onwards), grenades were overpainted in olive drab, leaving a narrow yellow ring remaining at the top. Not all were overpainted, however, as D-Day film footage shows. Mk 2 practice grenades were painted red (a practice copied from the French military). M21 practice grenades were painted light blue (a practice copied from the British military) and had blue-painted fuse levers, often with the end painted light brown indicating a "low explosive" marking charge.

== Variants ==
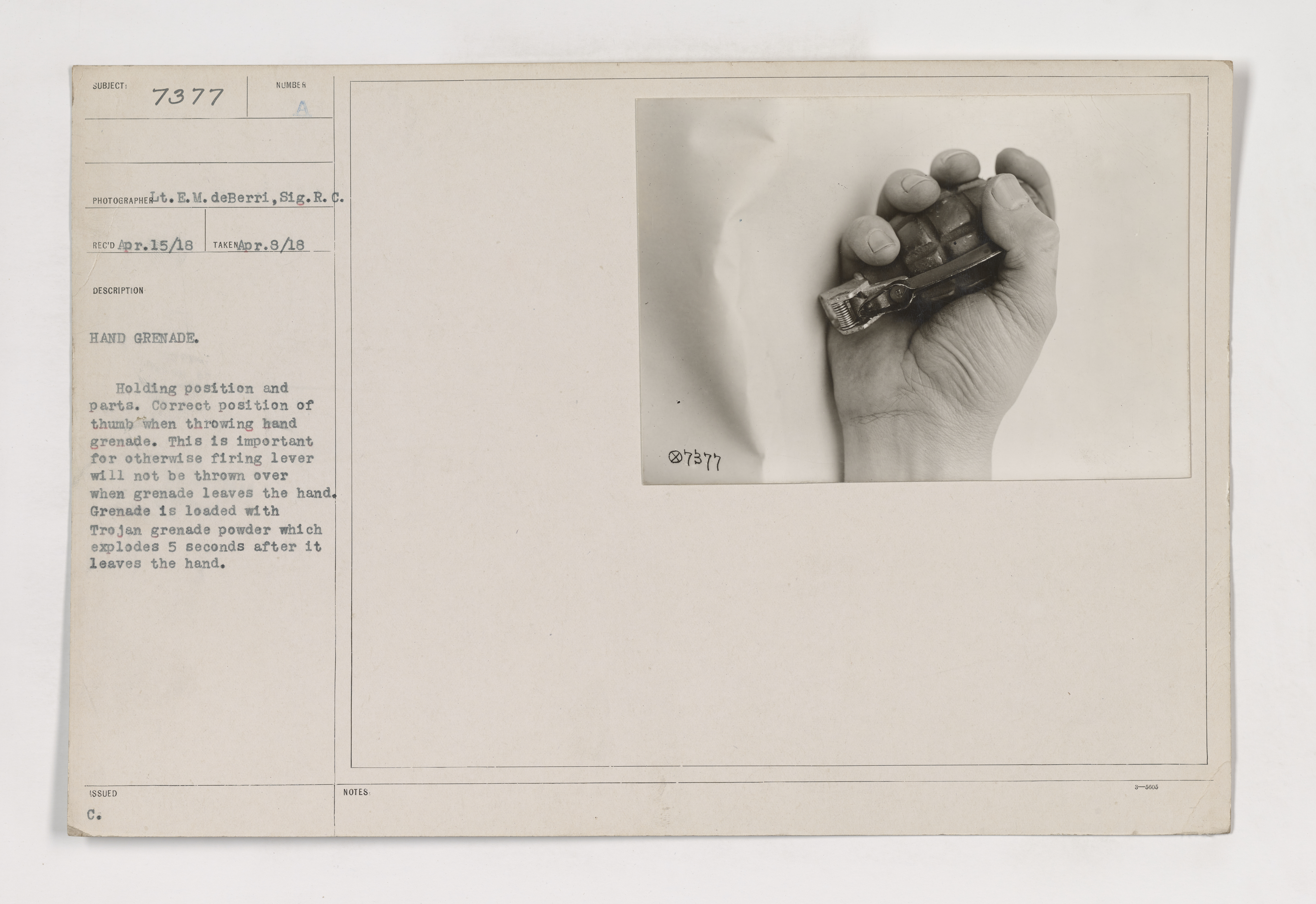
Instructional document showing correct throwing technique (1918): "Correct position of thumb when throwing […] is important for otherwise firing lever will not be thrown over when grenade leaves the hand."

Mk 2 grenades came 25 to a wooden crate and were shipped in small fiberboard packing tubes. High explosive-filled Mk 2s were shipped unfused to prevent accidental detonation. Their fuses were shipped separately and came in flat cardboard boxes of 25. EC powder-filled grenades were shipped with their fuses attached.

Variants included:

=== Grenade, hand, fragmentation, Mk 2 ===
EC powder filler, uses M10 series igniting fuse

=== Grenade, hand, fragmentation, high explosive, Mk 2 ===
TNT, Trojan grenade powder, 50/50 amatol/nitrostarch, or Grenite filler, uses M5 series detonating fuse. In 1930, "high explosive" was dropped from the designation.

=== Grenade, hand, fragmentation, Mk 2A1 ===
EC powder or TNT filler, uses M10/M11 series igniting fuse (EC powder) or M6 or M204 series detonating fuse (flaked TNT). Has no baseplug because it is filled through the fuse well.

=== Grenade, hand, practice, Mk 2 ===
Black powder "spotting" charge in a cardboard tube connected to a M10 series igniting fuse. Has a standard body with a wooden or cork baseplug that pops out during detonation, creating a loud report and smoke to indicate ignition. The body could be reused and reloaded as long as it remained intact.

=== Grenade, hand, practice, M21 ===
Black powder "spotting" charge, uses M10 series igniting fuse. Has a heavier body and no baseplug. Its body was embossed with the vertical letters R, D and X on the knobs in a column on one side (because it was originally designed to be for an HE grenade with a more powerful RDX filler). When detonated, it makes a loud report and smoke comes out of the fuse vents.

== Users ==
- Argentina
- Brazil
- Iran
- Israel
- Italy
- Philippines
- Turkey
- Taiwan: Locally produced copies well into the 1990s
- Japan
- United States

=== Former users ===
- Chile: Locally produced copies well into the 1990s
- France: Used by Free French forces
- Italy
- Netherlands: Locally produced Mk 2A1 post-war copies

=== Non-State Actors ===
- Islamic State

== Gallery ==
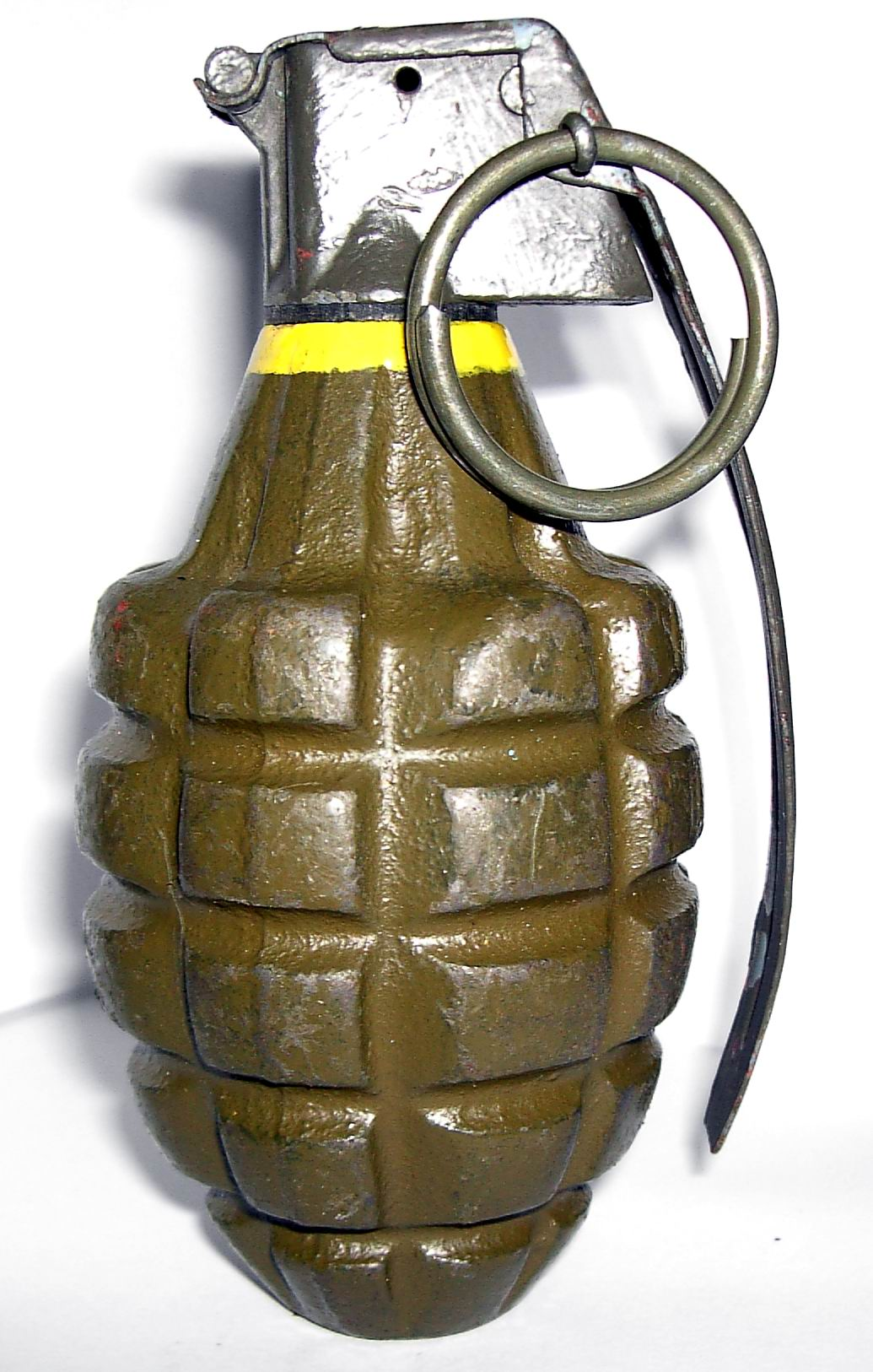
Post World War II-era Mk 2

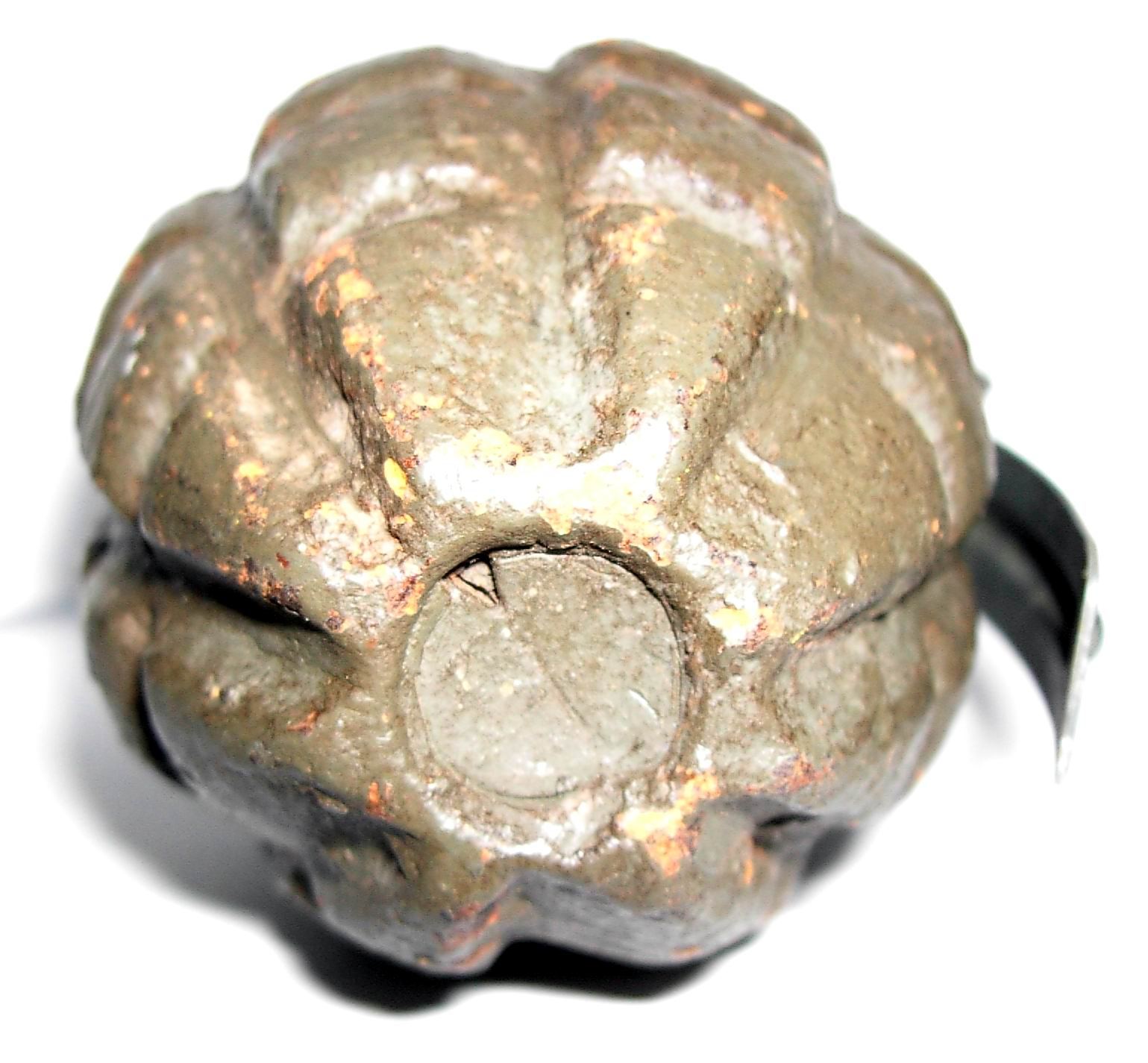
Bottom of a 1920–1942 baseplugged Mk 2

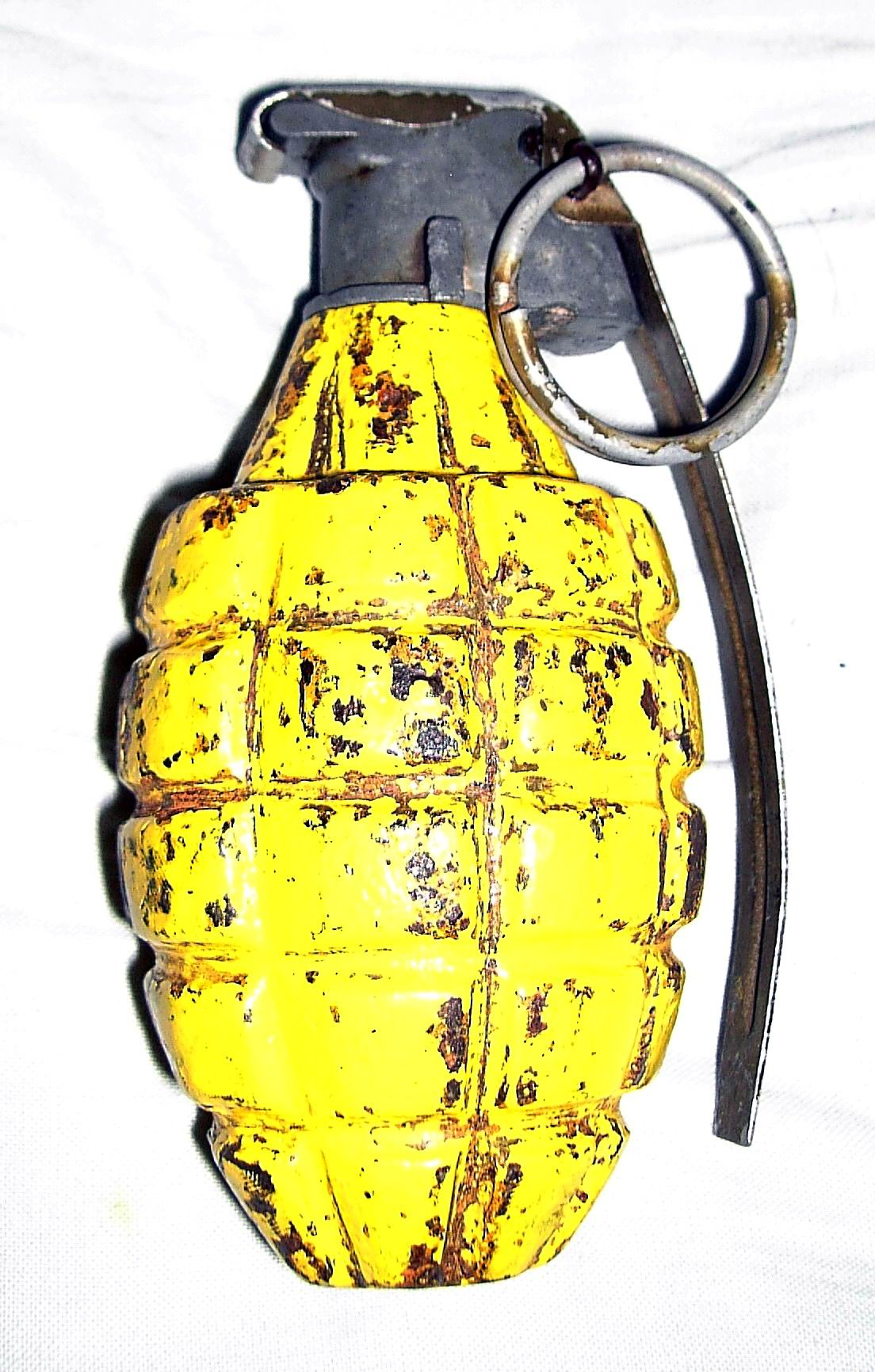
HE variant of the Mk 2

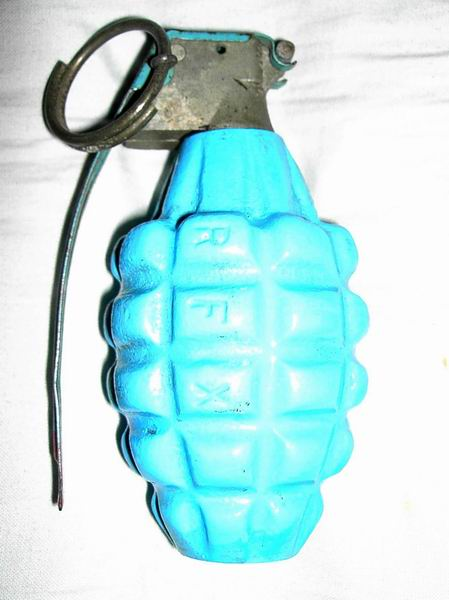
M21 practice variant designed for training

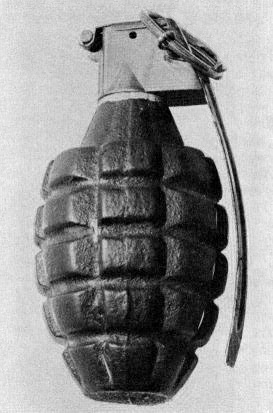
A Vietnam War era Mk 2 grenade

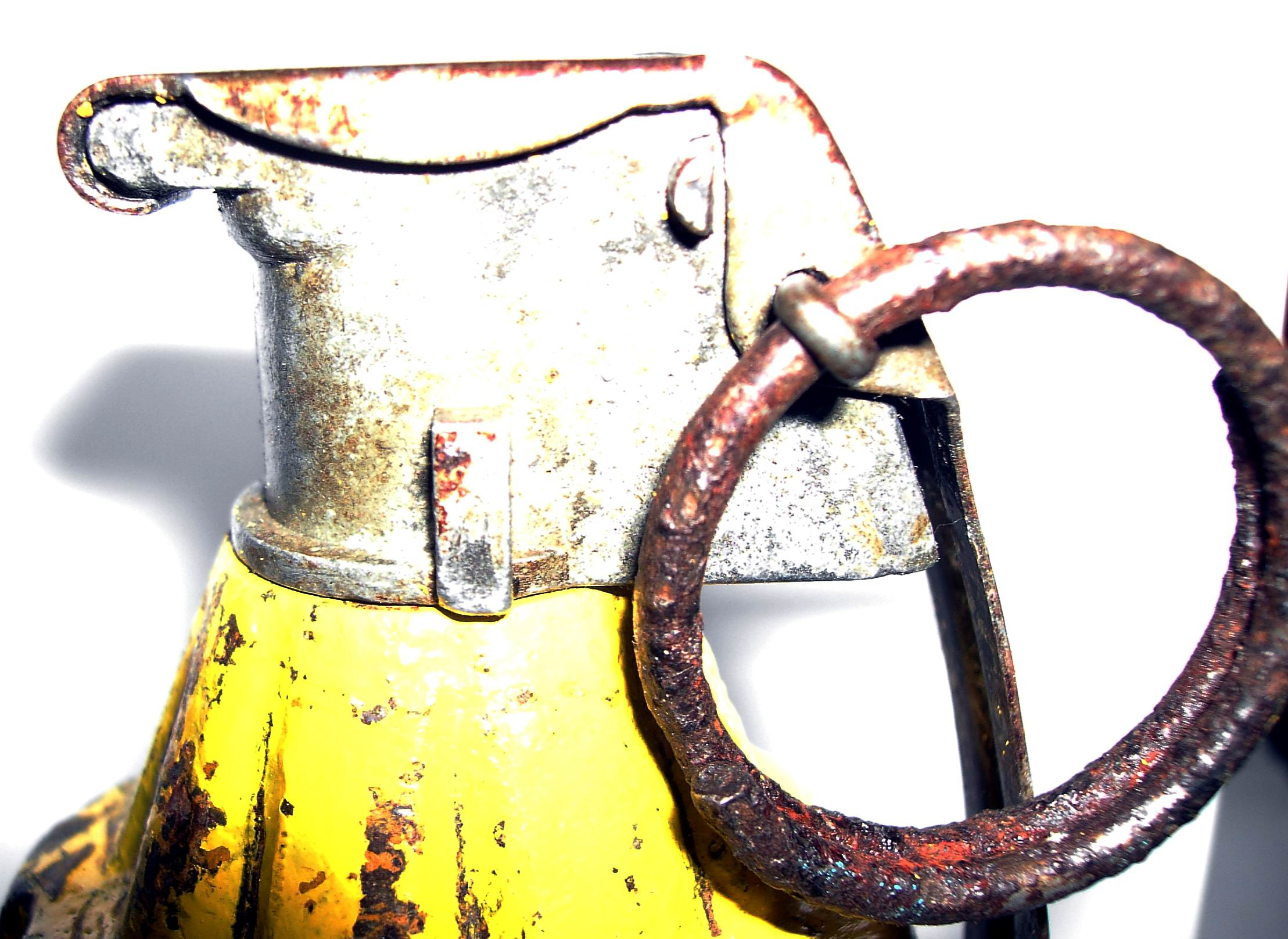
M10A3 series fuse assemblies on a Mk 2A1 grenade, dating from 1942

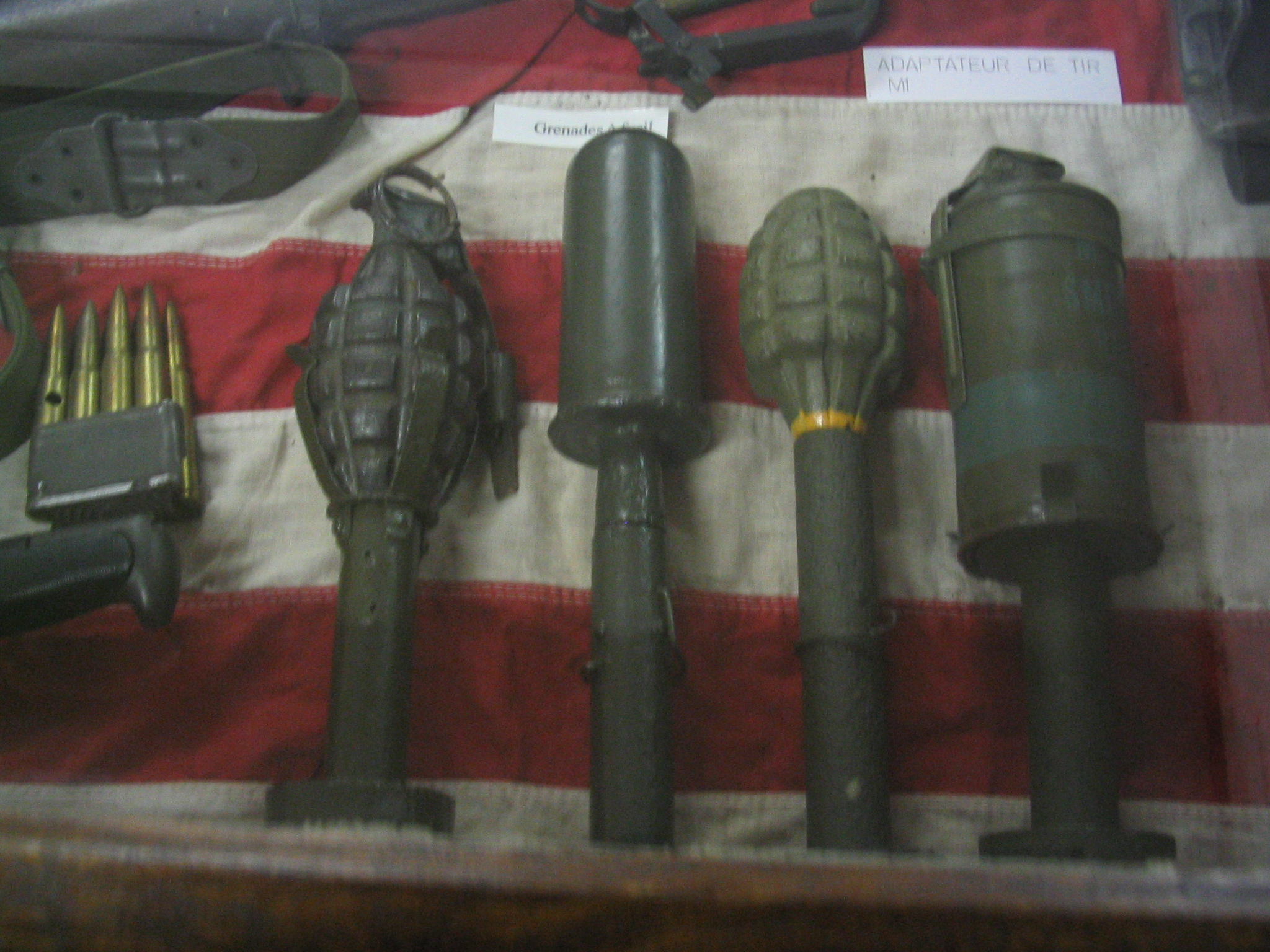
Early Mk 2 grenade (with baseplug) with M1 grenade adapter (first from left) and Mk 2A1 HE grenade (without baseplug) warhead on the M17 rifle grenade (third from left)

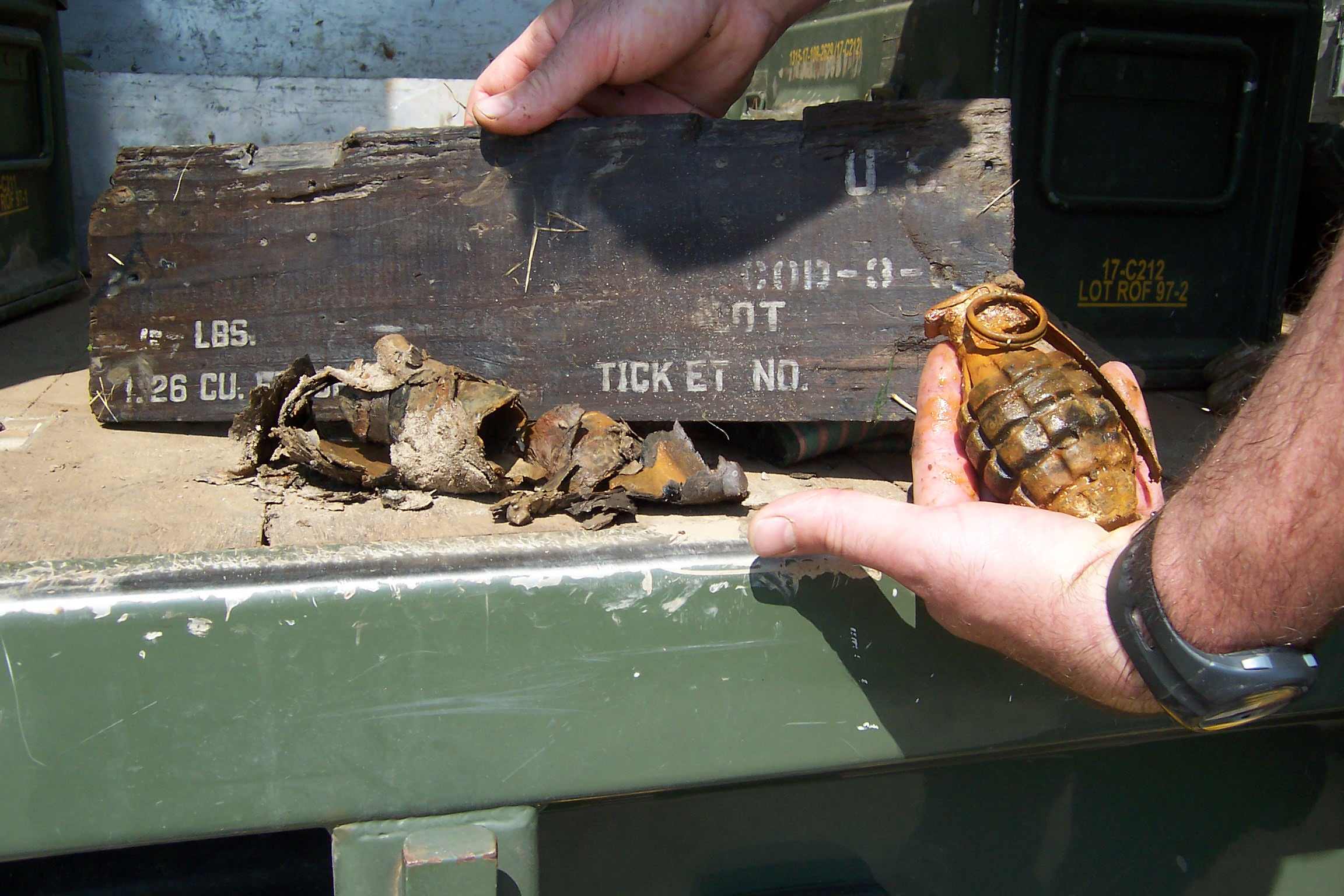
A World War II era Mk 2 grenade recovered in Opheusden, The Netherlands, in 2008

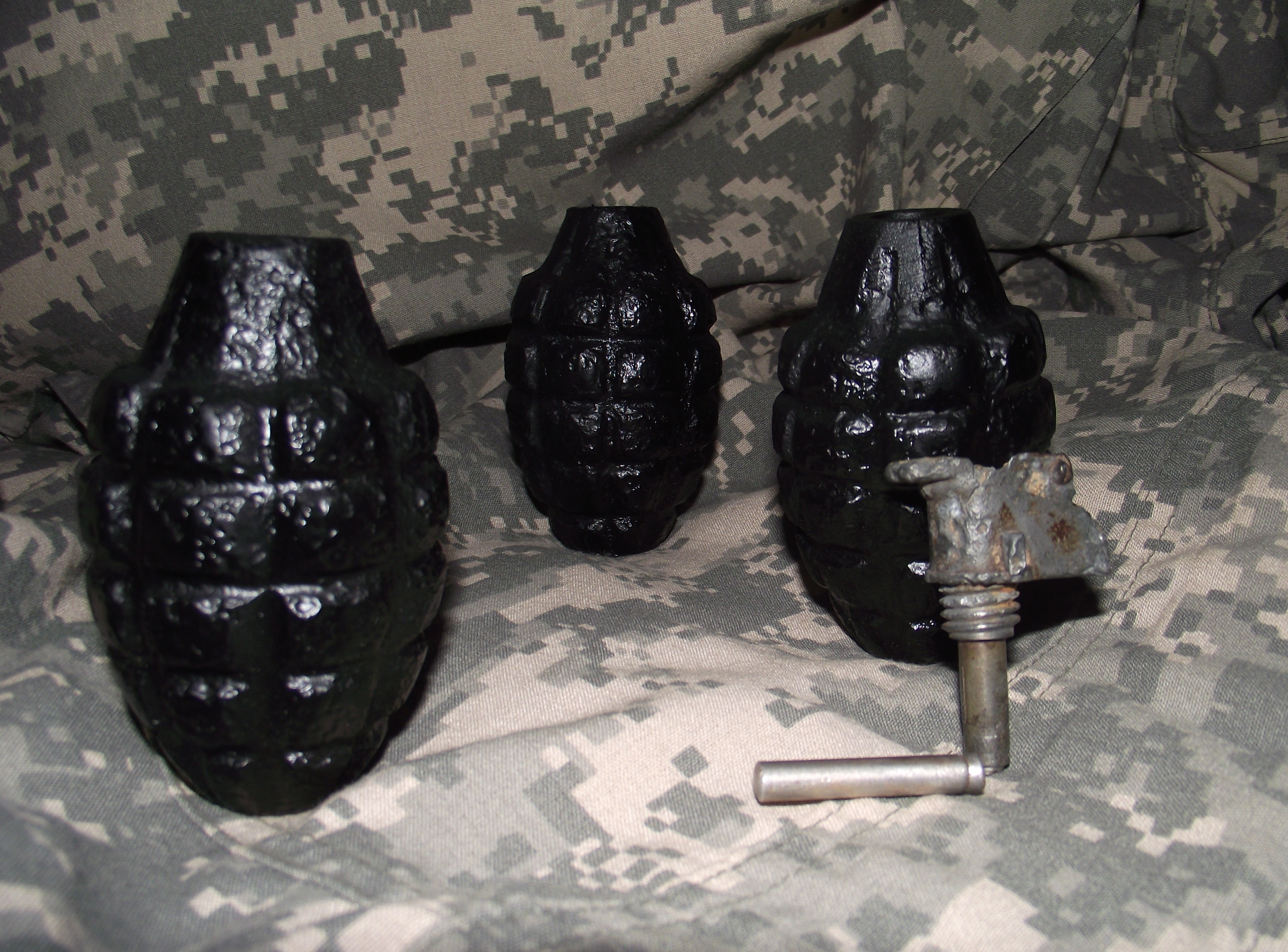
World War II era Mk 2 grenade in restoration recovered in Rio de Janeiro, Brazil in 2013

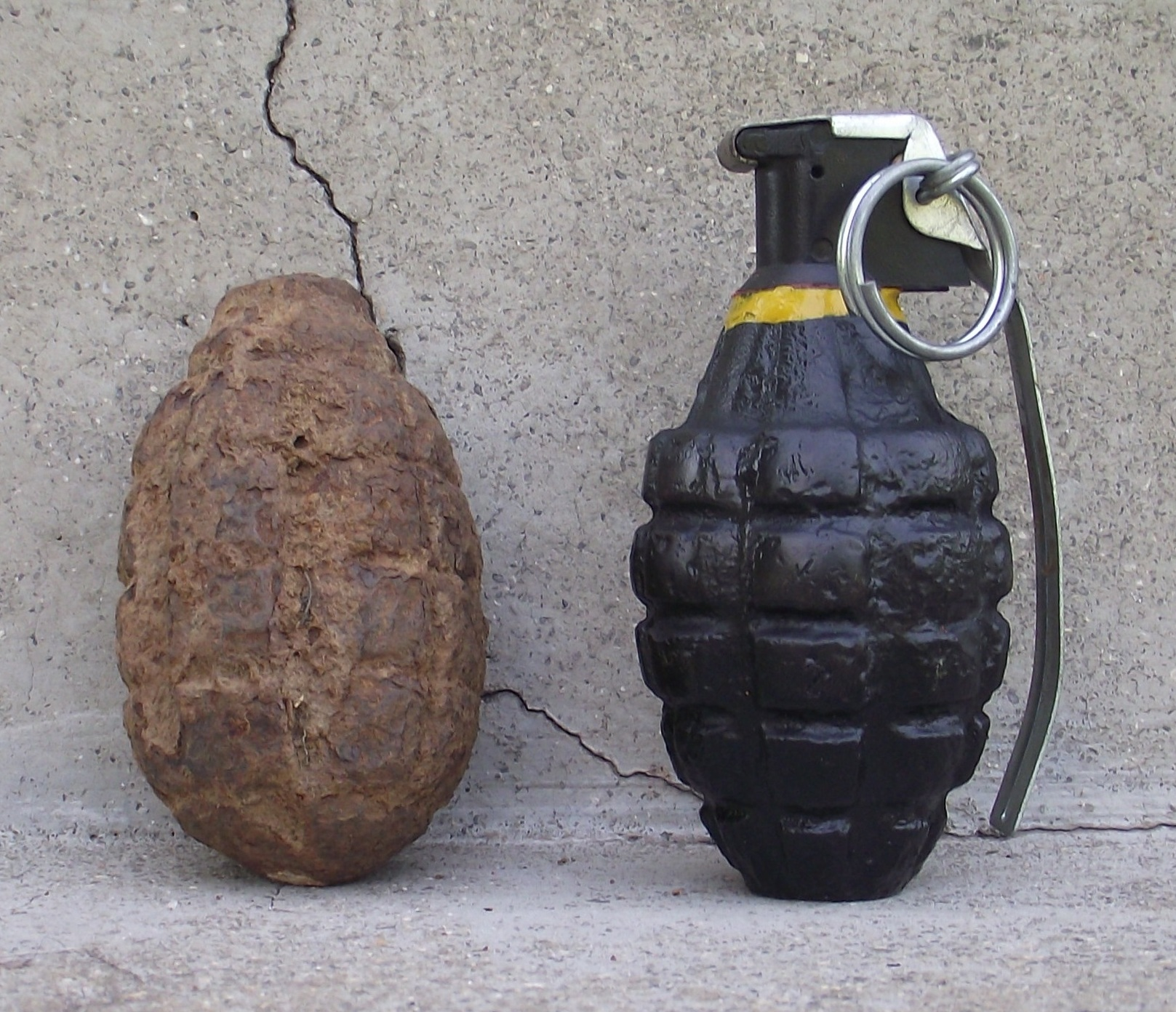
World War II era Mk2 grenade in restoration recovered in Rio de Janeiro, Brazil in 2013

== See also ==
- M1 Grenade Projection Adapter
- United States hand grenades

== Notes and references ==
- Gervasi, Tom. Arsenal of Democracy II: American Military Power in the 1980s and the Origins of the New Cold War: with a Survey of American Weapons and Arms Exports. New York: Grove Press, 1981. ISBN 0-394-17662-6.
- Rottman, Gordon L. (2015). The Hand Grenade. Bloomsbury Publishing. ISBN 978-1-4728-0735-9.
- War Department. Field Manual FM 23-30-1944: Hand and Rifle Grenades; Rocket, AT, HE, 2.36″ (February 1944); pp. 5–6.
