= Mk 1 grenade =

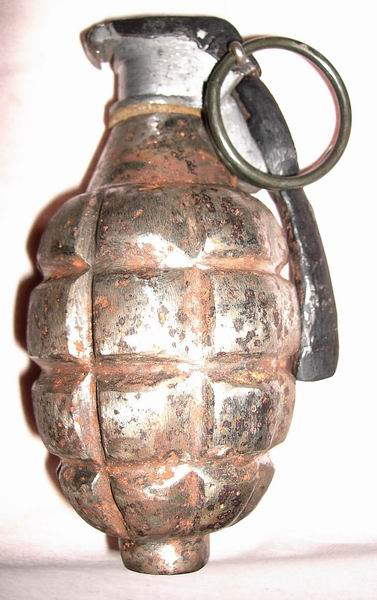
- Type: Fragmentation grenade
- Place of origin: United States

Service history
- In service: 1917–1918
- Used by: United States
- Wars: World War I

Production history
- Designer: Trench Warfare Section
- Designed: 1917
- Developed into: Mk 2 grenade
- Produced: 1917–1918
- No. built: Over 23 million

Specifications
- Mass: 22 oz (620 g)
- Filling: TNT; Trojan grenade powder; TNT and nitrostarch
- Filling weight: 4 oz (110 g)
- Detonation mechanism: 5-second delay

The Mk 1 grenade (sometimes spelled Mk I) is a fragmentation hand grenade used by American forces during World War I. According to its designers, it was to be the "simplest", yet most "fool-proof", grenade ever made. However, some major problems appeared when the grenade was used in the field. It was retired from service before the war ended, replaced in 1918 with the improved Mk 2 grenade used through World War II.

== Overview ==
The Mk 1 have a malleable iron body with 40 serrations, intended to ensure fragmentation upon detonation; During World War II it was proven that external serrations have no effect in fragmentation, though they did provide a better grip.

While it externally resembles the French F1 grenade, the Mk 1 uses a higher-grade of malleable iron and a more powerful explosive filler.

The Mk 1 was filled with 4 ounces (110 g) of TNT, Trojan grenade powder, or a 50/50 mixture of TNT and nitrostarch. When ready to use the grenade weighs 22 oz (620 g) and the effective fragmentation radius was estimated at 75 yards (69 m).

The fuse is based on the British Mills bomb No. 5, requiring the user to firmly grasp the grenade body and safety lever with one hand while the other pulls the safety pin; after the grenade is thrown, the safety lever flies off, setting off the detonator. A drawback of this method is unintentional detonation if the grenade is dropped either by accident or if the thrower is incapacitated after pulling the pin; to minimize this risk, a special mechanism—that automatically armed the grenade during the act of throwing—was added to the design.

To start the fuse, the user has to pull the safety pin, then push or shake off the cap on top of the grenade. Right before throwing, the user has to rotate the safety switch on the lever with their thumb—a task that proved to be difficult to do with an underhand throw or under the stress of combat with possibly cold hands in rain and mud—to activate the 5-second mousetrap-like detonator.

== History ==
Prior to World War I, the United States Army adopted a cylindrical hand grenade with a throwing sling, but it never saw combat. After examining the British Mills bomb and French F1 grenade, the Trench Warfare Section of the Ordnance Department worked on developing a grenade that was safer, simpler to operate, and more effective, resulting in the Mk 1 grenade in August 1917, with mass production following shortly after.

Practical experience showed that the Mk 1 design was too complicated to operate. The safety lever design in particular—described by US officials as "too safe"—was a frequent source of malfunctions. Soldiers often failed to properly turn the safety lever, preventing the grenades from detonating and allowing enemies to return them. During a military drill with live grenades, it was reported that at least 30% of the grenades weren't armed properly before throwing. On 9 May, 1918, the American Expeditionary Force rejected the Mk 1 as unsafe and too complicated to use. Subsequently the safety lever was redesigned resulting in the creation of the Mk 2 grenade in 1918.

Over 23 million Mk 1s were produced by the war's end.

== Variants ==
Two different training grenades were also produced, with practice grenades being largely identical to the Mk 1 with the explosive filling, detonator, fuse, and base screw omitted; and dummy grenades featuring smooth bodies.
