= Formula One Grand Prix =

Formula One Grand Prix, F1 Grand Prix or F1GP may refer to:

- Formula One Grand Prix – for example:
  - Formula One race weekend, for information about the Grand Prix event
  - List of Formula One Grands Prix, for a list of Grands Prix that have been held as part of the Formula One World Championship
- F-1 Grand Prix (video game series), a video game series created by Video System that started in 1991
- Formula One Grand Prix (video game), a video game released in 1992
- F1 Grand Prix (2005 video game), a video game released in 2005

== See also ==
- Grand Prix (disambiguation)
- Formula One (disambiguation)
- F1 (disambiguation)
- GP (disambiguation)
