= 1F =

1F may refer to:

- California Proposition 1F (2009)
- (−1)F, an operator in quantum mechanics
- 1 (F) Sqn or No. 1 Squadron RAF, a squadron of the Royal Air Force
- K. 1f, Mozart's brief Minuet in C notated in Nannerl Notenbuch
- 5-HT1F receptor or 5-hydroxytryptamine (serotonin) receptor 1F
- Astra 1F, one of the Astra communications satellites
- Fukushima I Nuclear Power Plant or 1F
- "1F", a song by American rock band White Reaper from their 2019 album You Deserve Love

== See also ==
- F1 (disambiguation)
