= MK3 grenade =

American hand grenade

MK3 offensive grenade
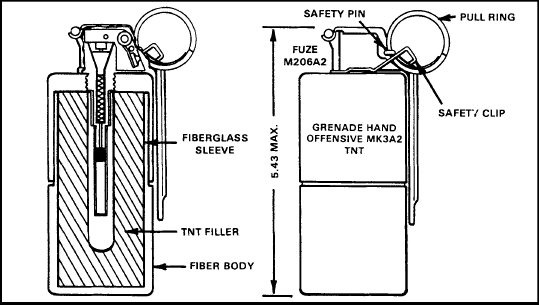
- Diagram of a MK3A2 grenade
- Type: High explosive hand grenade
- Place of origin: United States

Service history
- In service: 1918–present (limited)
- Used by: United States
- Wars: World War I; World War II; Vietnam War

Production history
- Designed: 1917–1918
- No. built: 7,000,053 (Mk III)
- Variants: See § Variants

Specifications (MK3A2)
- Mass: 15.6 oz (440 g)
- Length: 5.275 in (134.0 mm)
- Height: 5.43 in (138 mm)
- Diameter: 2.13 in (54 mm)
- Filling: TNT
- Filling weight: 8 oz (230 g)
- Detonation mechanism: 4–5 second timer

The MK3 hand grenade is a cylindrical high explosive grenade, designated by the United States Army as an offensive grenade, it's the latest iteration of a series of grenades designed for offensive operations, where the lack of fragmentation minimizes the risk of injuries for advancing friendly troops and also designed for demolition tasks.

First introduced in 1918, the MK3 series was the only offensive hand grenade of the US Army, until the introduction of the M111 in 2026.

== Design ==
The MK3 was designed to produce casualties during close combat while minimizing danger to friendly personnel exposed in the open owing to minimal fragmentation. It's also used for demolishing enemy fortifications and the shockwaves (overpressure) generated by the MK3 are greater than fragmentation grenades in enclosed spaces, making it effective at clearing occupied bunkers, buildings, and fortified areas.

The lethal radius of the blast is 2 metres (2.2 yd) from the impact point in the open, but there is also a secondary fragmentation hazard from bits of fuze and loose objects near the detonation—rocks, gravel, wood splinters, glass, etc.—can be projected as far as 200 m (220 yd) from the center of the explosion.

== Variants ==
=== Offensive hand grenade Mark III ===
Developed in 1917–1918, the Mk III had a grey-painted cardboard body about 3/33 inch (2.3 mm) thick, with the inner cavity coated with paraffin wax while the exterior was treated with a waterproofing agent, and a lead-antimony alloy die cast cap containing the Bouchon fuze assembly was tightly crimped to the top of the body. The grenade had a total length of 3 3/4 in (95 mm) and a diameter of 1 7/8 in (48 mm) and weighted in approximately 15 ounces (430 g), of which 4 oz (110 g) was the nitrostarch (Note: Referred to in US Army manuals as "Trojan Grenade Powder", after the Trojan Powder Company.) explosive filler.

Over 7 million grenades were produced for the American Expeditionary Forces (AEF) with a total of 173,136 Mk IIIs (Note: A total of 4,803,192 grenades were readied for shipping before the end of WWI.) delivered to France before the end of World War I, but none were reportedly used in combat by the AEF which made use of readily available British or French grenades instead. A total of 46,516 grenades were issued to training camps in the US. After the war, the remaining Mark III grenades in the US Army inventory were scrapped.

=== Mk IIIA1 offensive hand grenade ===
Officially designated as the Grenade, Hand, Offensive MK. IIIA1, it was standard offensive grenade of the US Army during World War II, the Mark IIIA1 had a laminated cartridge paper body with a sheet metal top threaded to accept the M6A3 fuze, which uses a tetryl charge compressed in a lead tube that detonated the 6.83 oz (194 g) TNT filler after 4–5 seconds. The complete grenade weighted 14 oz (400 g).

=== MK3A2 offensive hand grenade ===
Introduced into US Army service in 1968, the MK3A2 grenade have a pressed fiber body painted black with yellow identification markings and impregnated with asphalt; it is fitted with either a M206A1 or M206A2 pyrotechnic fuze. Both fuses use a lead azide, lead styphnate and RDX charge to detonate the 8 oz (230 g) flaked TNT filler after 4–5 seconds, differing only in body construction.

The M206A1 and M206A2 fuzes are issued with or without a safety clip, which is designed to keep the safety lever firmly in place should the safety pin be unintentionally pulled off. The complete MK3A2 weights 15.6 oz (440 g) and the average soldier can throw it up to 40 m (44 yd).

In March 2026, the US Army approved the M111 offensive hand grenade for Full Material Release to fully replace the MK3A2 in service—the latter use is restricted due to its asbestos body.

== Specifications ==
Comparison between variants
| Model | Fuze | Mass | Filling | Filling weight |
|---|---|---|---|---|
| Mk III | Bouchon | 15 oz (430 g) | Nitrostarch | 4 oz (110 g) |
| Mk IIIA1 | M6A3 | 14 oz (400 g) | TNT | 6.83 oz (194 g) |
| MK3A2 | M206A1 or M206A2 | 15.6 oz (440 g) | TNT | 8 oz (230 g) |
