= Formula One (disambiguation) =

Formula One is the highest class of auto racing sanctioned by the FIA.

Formula One or Formula 1 may also refer to:

== Motorsports ==
- Formula I, a former category of Formula TT motorcycle racing
- Formula One Air Racing
- F1 Powerboat World Championship
- Formula First, an open-wheel open-cockpit single-seater junior formula championship
- BriSCA Formula 1, a British Stock Car Association racing formula
- Australian Formula 1, an Australian motor racing category current from 1970 to 1983
- British Formula One Championship, a domestic British F1 championship that ran from 1978 to 1982
- South African Formula One Championship, a F1 championship run in South Africa and Rhodesia from 1960 to 1975

== Games ==
- Formula 1 (board game), an early 1960s board game from Waddingtons
- Formula One (1985 video game), published by CRL for the ZX Spectrum and Amstrad CPC computers
- F1 (video game), a 1993 video game released in North America as Formula One
- Formula One (video game series), developed by Psygnosis/Studio Liverpool for PlayStation range of consoles
  - Formula 1 (video game), the first game in the series released in 1996

== Other uses ==
- Hotel Formule 1, a budget hotel chain in Europe

== See also ==
- F1 (disambiguation)
- Formula One Grand Prix (disambiguation)
- Formula 1000, a 1-L (1000-cc) engine open-wheel open-cockpit single-seater racing category
- Formula, Vol. 1, an album by Romeo Santos
