= Xiaomi Pocophone F1 =

2018 smartphone by Xiaomi

Xiaomi Pocophone F1 (Xiaomi Poco F1 in India)
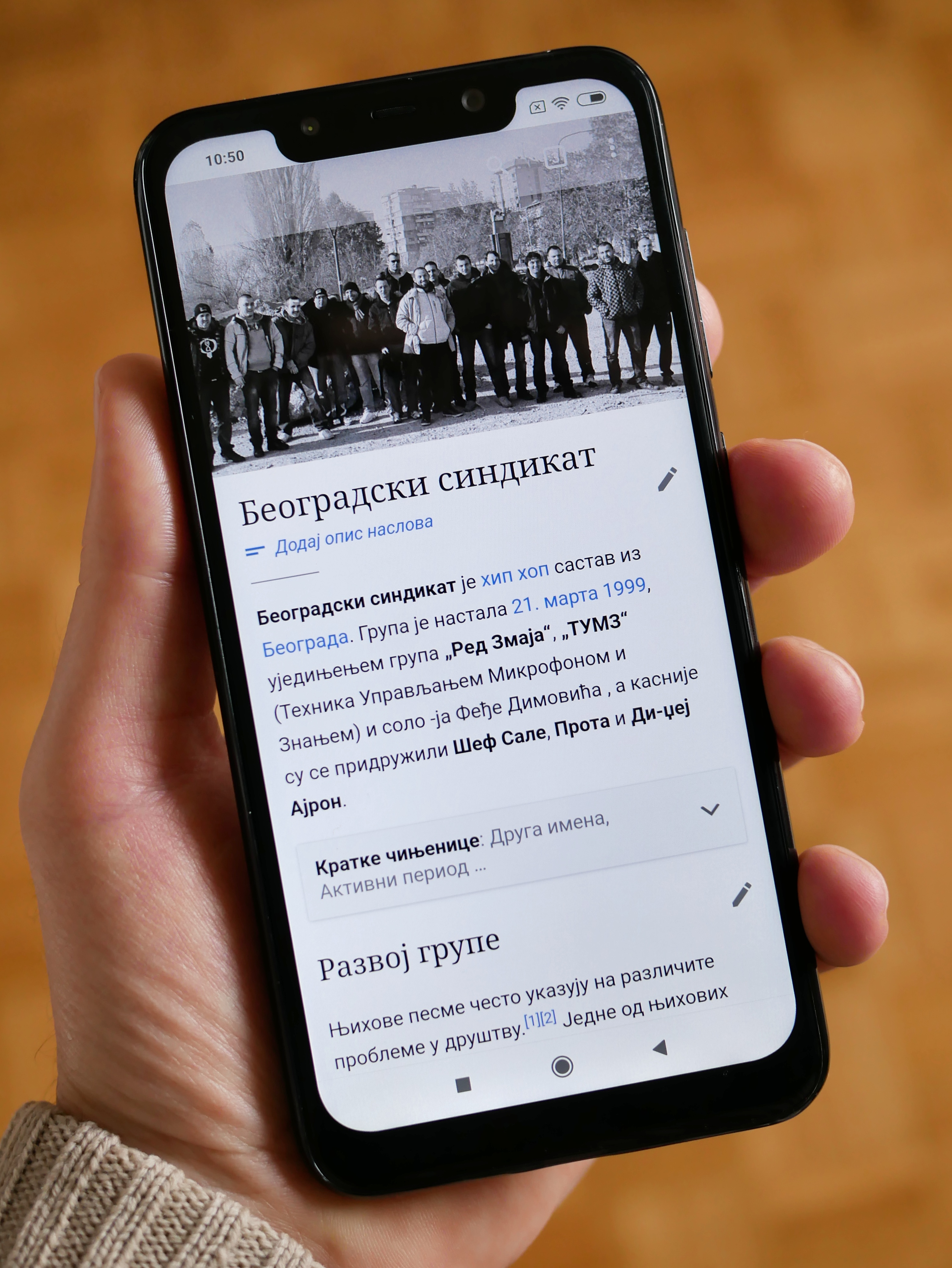
- Xiaomi Pocophone F1 front
- Manufacturer: Xiaomi
- Type: Phablet
- Series: Poco F
- First released: August 2018; 8 years ago
- Predecessor: Redmi Pro
- Successor: Redmi K20 Pro; Redmi K30 Pro/Poco F2 Pro
- Related: Xiaomi Mi 8
- Compatible networks: GSM / HSPA / LTE
- Form factor: Slate
- Dimensions: H: 155.5 mm (6.12 in); W: 75.3 mm (2.96 in); D: 8.8 mm (0.35 in)
- Weight: 182 g (6.4 oz); Armored 187 g (6.6 oz)
- Operating system: Original: MIUI 9.6 based on Android 8.1 Oreo; Current: MIUI 12 based on Android 10 Unofficial: Android 15 through various custom roms PostmarketOS Installation wiki Mobian Installation images Windows through Renegade Project
- CPU: Qualcomm Snapdragon 845 Octa-core (4x2.8 GHz Kryo 385 Gold & 4x1.8 GHz Kryo 385 Silver)
- GPU: Adreno 630
- Memory: 6/8 GB
- Storage: 256 GB/8 GB RAM; 64/128 GB, 6 GB RAM
- Removable storage: microSD, up to 256 GB
- Battery: 4000 mAh non-removable Li-Po (Quick Charge™ 3.0 and Supports Quick Charge™ 4+)
- Rear camera: 12 MP (ƒ/1.9, 1.4 μm), phase detection autofocus, dual-LED dual-tone flash, Geo-tagging, touch focus, face detection, panorama, HDR, 4K UHD@60fps, 4K UHD@30fps, 2160p@30fps, 2160p@60fps, 1080p@60fps, 1080p@30fps (gyro-EIS), 720p@30fps,
- Front camera: 20 MP, HDR, 1080p@30fps
- Display: 6.18 inches (96.2 cm^{2}) 1080 x 2246 pixels (403 ppi), 18,7:9 ratio, IPS LCD capacitive touchscreen, 16M colors, 1500:1 contrast ratio
- Connectivity: 2G, 3G, 4G, 4G LTE, Wi-Fi 802.11 a/b/g/n/ac, dual-band, Wi-Fi Direct, DLNA, hotspot, Bluetooth v5.0, A2DP, LE, aptX HD
- Codename: Beryllium
- Other: AGPS, GPS, GLONASS, BDS, Infrared face recognition, fingerprint (rear-mounted), accelerometer, gyro, proximity, compass, LiquidCool Technology
- Website: Official website

The Xiaomi Pocophone F1 (Xiaomi Poco F1 in India) is a smartphone developed by Xiaomi Inc, a Chinese electronics company based in Beijing. It was announced on 22 August 2018 in New Delhi, India. Though part of Xiaomi's line of mid-range devices, it is equipped with high-end specifications. The device is available globally in limited numbers, except for India where it enjoys wide availability. The Pocophone was often considered to be a flagship model of the Redmi line of 2019, although officially marketed as a separate and distinct model.

== Specifications ==
=== Hardware ===
The Pocophone F1 runs on a Snapdragon 845 (10 nm) SoC with an Adreno 630 to handle graphics. It features a 6.18" IPS LCD capacitive touchscreen screen with an aspect ratio of 18.7:9 and a resolution of 1080 x 2246 pixels. The display also has a wide notch at the top. There is also the Gorilla Glass 3 protection. this phone has gone for a polycarbonate body. Another variant of the Pocophone F1, dubbed the Armoured Edition, had a kevlar finish on the back of the phone as opposed to the polycarbonate.

==== Camera ====
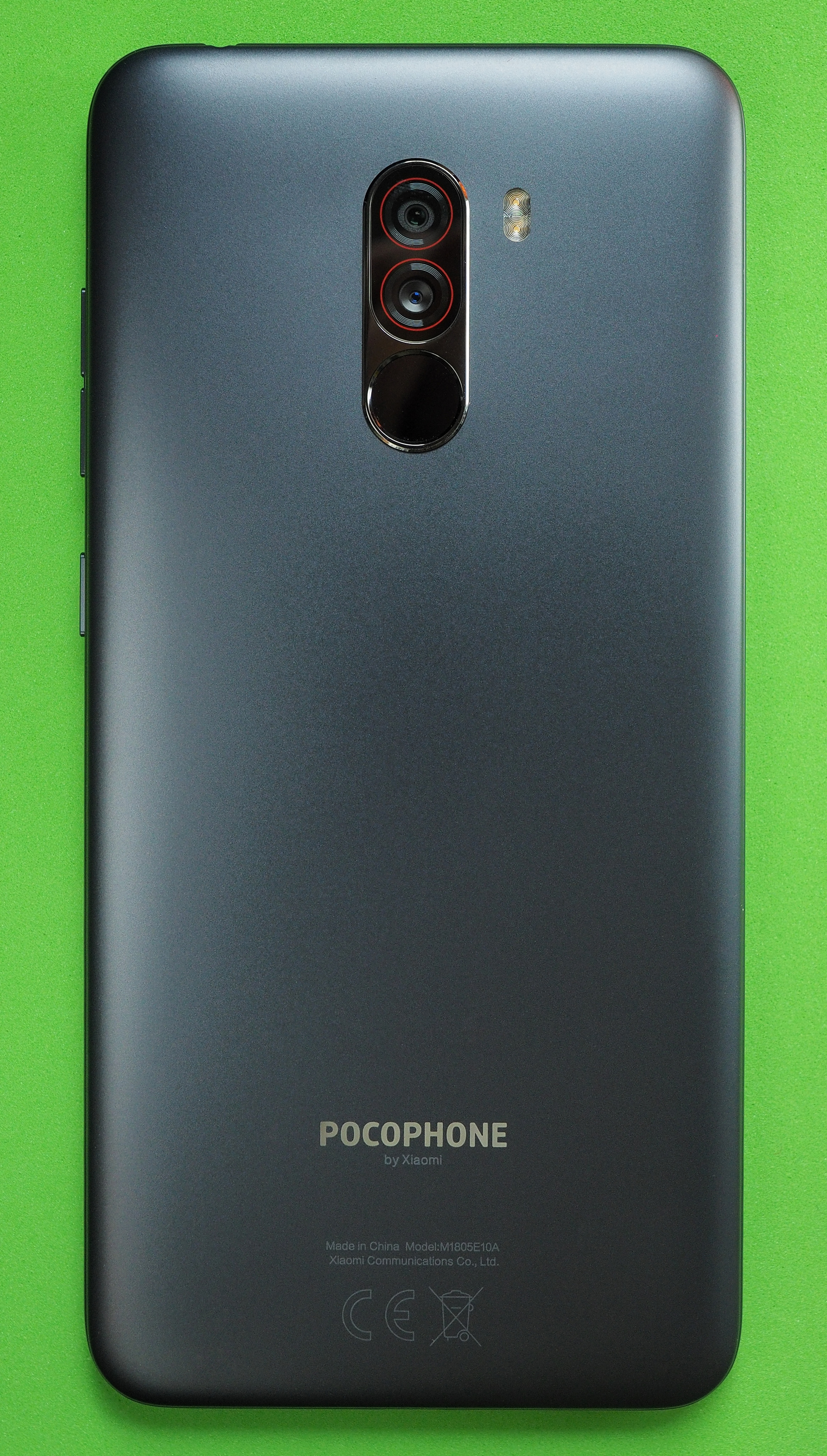
Xiaomi Pocophone F1 backplate

The Pocophone F1 has dual rear cameras based on Sony's Exmor RS (stacked CMOS) IMX363 1/2.55" sensor with 12 MP, ƒ/1.9 aperture and 1.4 μm pixel size. It has dual pixel Phase detection autofocus (PDAF). The secondary camera acts as a depth sensor with 5 MP, aperture ƒ/2.0 and pixel size of 1.12 μm and a dual-LED flash. The camera has HDR and panorama options. Video can be made in 2160p@60 fps, 1080p@60 fps (gyro-EIS), or 1080p@960 fps mode. The camera has a manual mode as well; users can adjust white balance (presets and light temperature), set a shutter speed (1/1000s to 32s) and ISO (100-3200). There is also a manual focus with focus peaking. A software update in January 2019 added 960fps slo-mo video recording and night mode.

At the front, the device features a 20 MP selfie camera with ƒ/2.0 aperture and 0.9 μm pixel size, which has HDR software and analytic capabilities coupled with 2 μm large-pixel (4-in-1 Super Pixel) technology. Selfie software includes AI Beautify 4.0 and precise bokeh effects. Video can be recorded at 1080p@30 fps. There is also an infrared light sensor and infrared camera for facial recognition.

Pictures can be taken in JPEG or RAW format (RAW in DNG format is available on the Open Camera application and Google Camera Ports). The camera app has an option of including watermarks in the picture.

==== Battery ====
The Pocophone F1 has a 4000 mAh Li-Po battery. The battery is 18 W ″Quick Charge™ 3.0″ type developed by Qualcomm where the port (USB Type-C port) is vastly superior to standard USB. It has 94 h of endurance as tested by GSMarena.

==== Memory ====
The Pocophone F1 comes with internal storage options of 256 GB/8 GB RAM or 64/128 GB with 6 GB RAM; both have expandable memory through a microSD card up to 256 GB which uses up the second SIM slot.

=== Software ===
The Pocophone F1 runs on MIUI 11 based on Android 10. Since 4 March 2020, the software is upgradable to a stable version of Android 10.

There is a large software modding community for the Poco F1. There are a huge variety of aftermarket custom ROMs or operating systems for the end user to install as they wish (after the user unlocks their bootloader).

== Sales ==
Since it was announced in August 2018, it instantly became Xiaomi's bestseller with 700,000 units sold until 6 December 2018. It was the top rated smartphone of Q3 2018 in India.

== Issues ==
Early copies of the phone had screen bleeding issues. Some users of the international version of the phone reported issues related to an oversensitive screen.

Upon release, the device came with Google's Widevine L3 certification, but with a software update released in February 2019, the phone promptly received L1 certification. This allowed users to playback DRM-protected content without any restrictions.

The phone also allows HDR playback from the YouTube app even though the display does not have the feature, causing the videos to look washed out, grey and a bit darker compared to videos that aren't HDR.

The display on some units suffer from screen retention even after being replaced with a new and original display. The temporary solution some users found is to turn off the display for a few seconds to a minute and then turn it on again.

== Reception ==
The Pocophone F1 received very positive reviews. Media outlets described the device as a flagship smartphone at a bargain price. Among the pros are a good camera and a strong battery. The Pocophone F1 was the runner-up of MKBHD's blind smartphone camera test in 2018. It also received a score of 91 from DxOMark, placing it in between the iPhone 8 and the Google Pixel. The phone was positively reviewed by GSMarena in 2019 but they noted that the built in speakers are not the best and that some may not like MIUI.
