= Roberts Landing, California =

Roberts Landing
- Former settlement
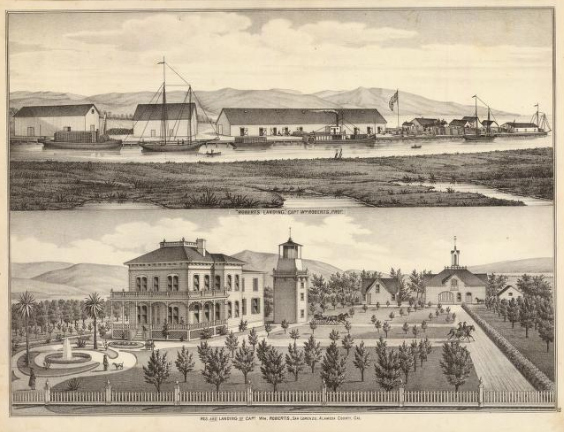
- Landing and residence of Captain William Roberts, as illustrated in Thompson and West's 1878 New Historical Atlas of Alameda County

- Location in California
- Coordinates: 37°40′23″N 122°09′54″W
- Country: United States
- State: California
- County: Alameda
- Elevation: 6.6 ft (2 m)

Roberts Landing (Note: The name is variously spelled "Robert's Landing", "Roberts' Landing" and "Roberts Landing". Some sources use more than one version. This article follows the United States Geological Survey in using the simplest and most common form.) was a settlement in Alameda County, California, United States, now incorporated into the town of San Leandro. It is located at the mouth of San Lorenzo Creek on San Francisco Bay just west of the community of San Lorenzo. In the 19th century, it had warehouses and a wharf, and was used by farmers to ship their produce to the city of San Francisco. From 1906 to 1964, it was the site of an explosives manufacturing plant operated by the Trojan Powder Company. Following the plant's closure, the site was decontaminated. After protracted discussions, part was made into a housing development while a larger part was made an open space that is now also called the San Leandro Shoreline Marshlands.

== Location ==
When the landing was founded in 1850 it was in the marshlands at the foot of San Lorenzo Creek on a navigable slough leading into San Francisco Bay. The region had been transferred from the Mission San José to the State of California after the Mexican–American War (1846–1848). San Lorenzo Creek drains 48 square miles (120 km^{2}) of the Berkeley Hills. It flows west from the hills and enters the east side of San Francisco Bay opposite the city of San Francisco. In the past it followed an incised channel across the coastal plain and then spread out into marshes along the Bay. The creek was insignificant in the summer, but in winter could be torrential. The freshwater marshes fed by the creek merged into more saline tidal marshes nearer the bay.

During the California Gold Rush (1848–1855) the marshes provided abundant wildfowl for the San Francisco market, including geese, ducks, teal and smaller birds. After this, the demand for salt led to widespread commercial salt farming, with levees, ditches and fences built across the marshes. Roberts Landing today is a 478 acres (193 ha) area in the City of San Leandro. After environmental clean-up, 79 acres (32 ha) in the southeast of the site has been developed for housing, and the remainder is restored wetland and open space.

== History ==
=== Early years (1850–1906) ===
The landing, originally named Thompson's Landing, was founded in 1850 by Robert Thompson, Peter Anderson, and Captain William Roberts. The landing was built on one of the largest of the tidal sloughs in the San Lorenzo marshes, connected to dry land by a road that crossed the small water channels and skirted the larger ones. An 1857 USCS map shows the road leading to Roberts Landing along the same route as the modern Lewelling Boulevard apart from a detour around a meandering slough at one point. The landing had a long wharf and for many years was used to ship farm produce across to San Francisco.

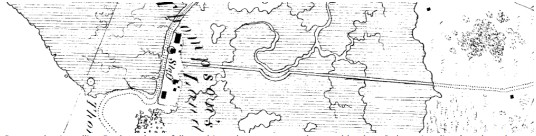
1857 United States Coast Survey map showing the road across the marsh to Thompson's landing (Roberts Landing)

William Roberts, whose family originated in Amlwch, Wales, sailed for America when he was nineteen and after rounding Cape Horn reached San Francisco on 27 March 1850. After a short time in the mining camps on the Yuba River and Sacramento, he settled in "Squattersville", which became San Lorenzo in 1854, and opened a landing for ships on a property that Robert Thompson had bought from the State of California. He bought Thompson out in 1856, and changed the name to Roberts' Landing. Roberts was the first to arrange for regular commercial service across the Bay to San Francisco by schooner. His Helen Eliza carried both freight and passengers. The landing became the main shipping point for the San Lorenzo valley and the neighboring San Ramon and Livermore valleys. Washington Boulevard was built to carry lumber to Roberts Landing from the Castro Valley redwood stands for shipment to San Francisco.

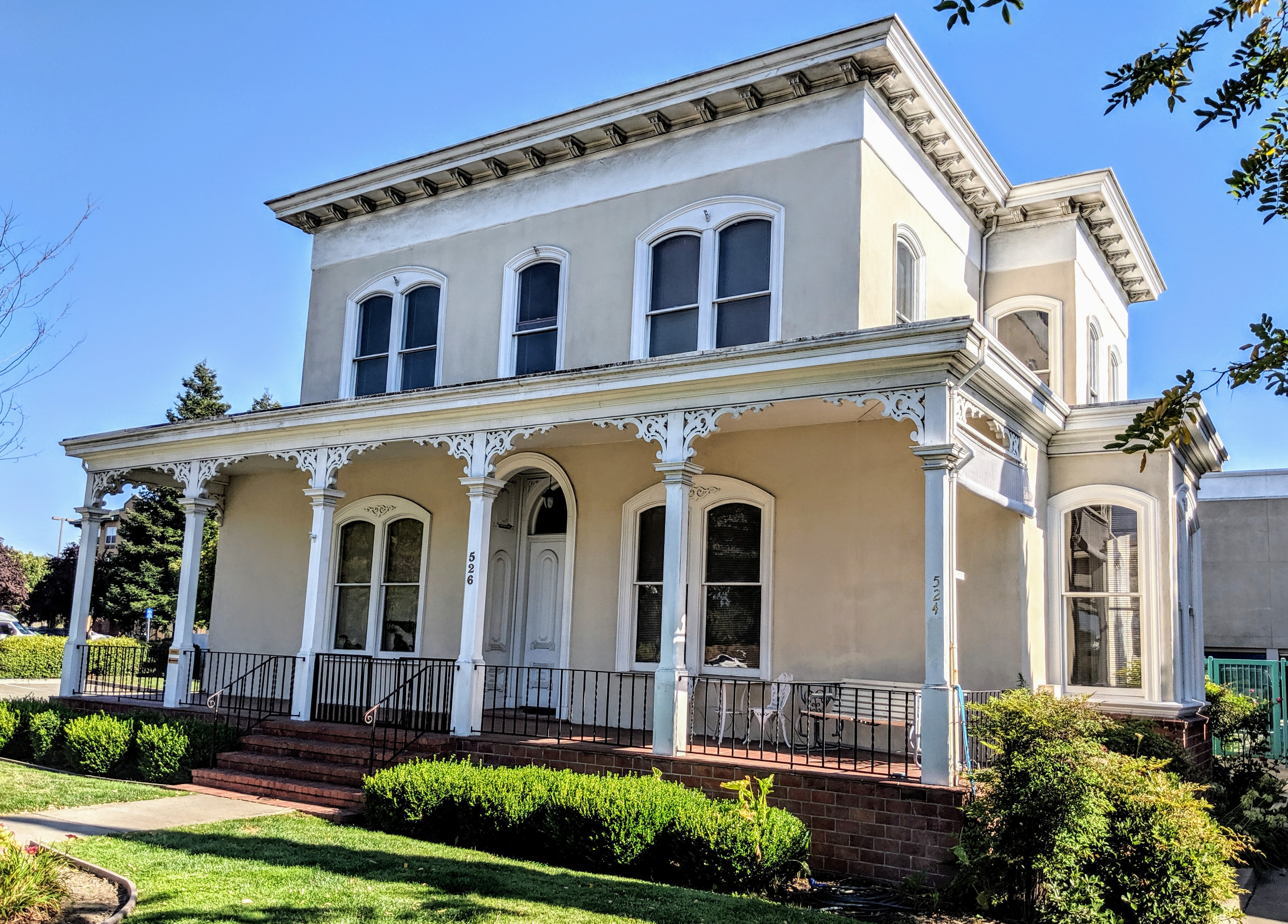
William Roberts house in San Lorenzo, California

Roberts made a voyage back to Wales and returned with two young cousins, Wiliam Owen and Owen William Owen. They reached New York on 11 May 1859, sailed around Cape Horn to San Francisco and crossed to Roberts Landing. Roberts grew his shipping business, exporting food from Alameda County farms and importing lumber for building. In the 1870s and 1880s he operated warehouses for hay and grain at the landing. (Note: An illustration of the warehouses on Robert's Landing in 1878 is item #3 in the San Leandro Historical Photograph and Document collection, in the San Leandro Library.) He built his family home near the "Four Corners" of San Lorenzo in 1869. The house on Lewelling Boulevard had stables and a large garden. Roberts and his wife, Ellen F. Davenport, had several children. They were buried in the Pioneer Cemetery in San Leandro.

The Robert station on the South Pacific Coast railway line between Alameda Point and Newark took its original name from the landing when it was built in the middle 1870s. It was later renamed the West San Lorenzo station when the Southern Pacific Railroad Company bought the line in 1887. The railway was eventually to cause the downfall of Roberts' shipping business.

=== Trojan period (1906–65) ===
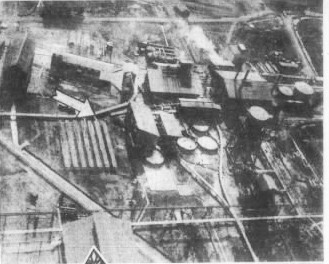
Trojan Powder Plant, Roberts Landing, c. 1922

In the early 1900s the wetlands at Roberts Landing were diked. The Pacific High Explosives Company was founded in 1906 to make Trojan powder in California. The Trojan Powder Works at Roberts Landing was established that year. (Note: One source says the Roberts Landing plant operated from 1900. This seems to be a typo. A source from February 1910 says the plant had been operating for 3 1/2 years, i.e. from 1906. This is more plausible given that the company was founded in 1906.) This was the only western plant of the Trojan Powder Company, then based in New York and in control of a large plant in Allentown, PA. The products of the Trojan Powder Factory were shipped on the Southern Pacific railway from the San Lorenzo railroad station.

Henry Jorgensen was killed in 1907 in an explosion at the powder factory. He was buried in the San Lorenzo Pioneer Cemetery. On 17 February 1910 the Trojan Powder Works at Roberts Landing blew up just before 11:00 a.m. There were two small, sharp explosions, then a huge explosion so powerful it broke all the windows in the San Leandro School, 2 miles (3.2 km) away. Five men were killed at once and three died later at the county infirmary. The body of one of the workers was thrown 500 feet (150 m) through the air into the nearby marsh. Several buildings caught fire, but the wind carried the flames away from the massive concrete powder magazine, which held 50,000–70,000 pounds (23,000–32,000 kg) of powder packed for shipment. One theory of the cause was that a box of explosives was dragged across the concrete floor, causing a spark. The company said they planned to rebuild at once.

In 1912 Pacific High Explosives reorganized as California Trojan Powder Company. The eastern and western companies consolidated as the Trojan Powder Company after World War I.

On 5 January 1922 the Oakland Tribune reported that the previous day two massive explosions had killed four employees at the Trojan Powder Works in Roberts Landing. Three men were killed instantly and another died in hospital. Four more were injured. The storehouses and dryer had been reduced to piles of splintered wood. Windows were broken in nearby houses.

Trojan's Roberts Landing factory closed in 1964. In 1964–65 the Trojan Powder Company tried without success to gain approval to re-zone their San Leandro property to create a waterfront community called Roberts Landing.

=== Later development ===
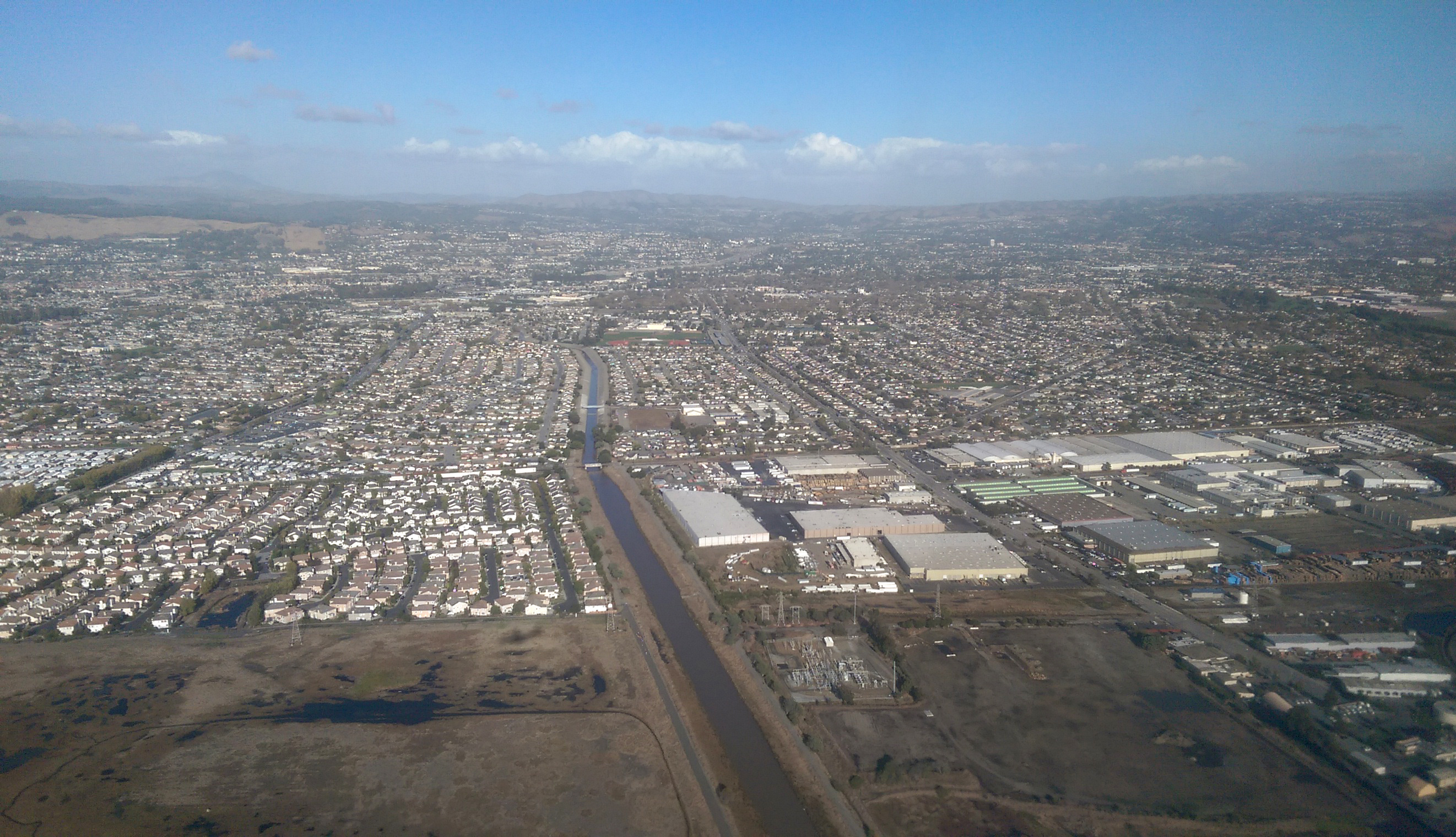
San Lorenzo from the west in 2016. San Lorenzo Creek in the center of the picture, restored marshlands in the foreground

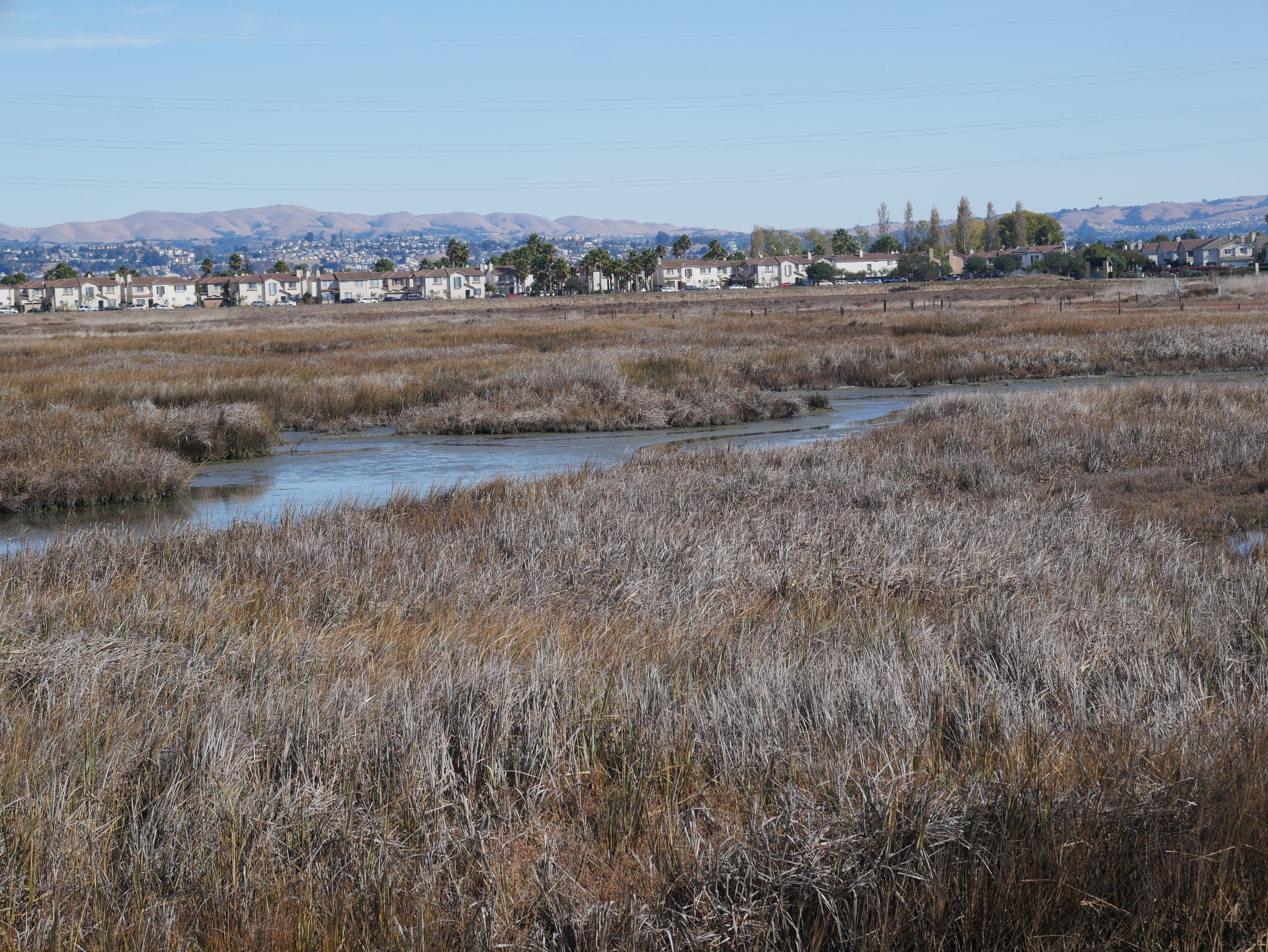
Marshlands at site of Roberts Landing, with recent development in background

For more than thirty years there was heated debate over disposal of the site. A 1974 survey by the US Army Corps of Engineers discussed a tidal barrier across the Bay between Sierra Point in the west and Roberts Landing in the east, with flap-gated culverts at each end to allow for transportation use. The report was negative: the only way to reduce tidal plains within the barrier pools was through locks, and this could not be cost-justified.

Extensive clean-up of the contaminated soil was required before the site could be used for a residential development and restored marshlands. Citizens for Alameda's Last Marshlands (CALM) campaigned against housing development in the late 1980s, arguing that there remained hazardous waste from the powder factory. Eventually the developer spent more than a million dollars on clean-up. An Environmental Impact Report prepared in March 1991 for the Roberts Landing Rezoning project noted that the Trojan Powder Company was on the CERCLIS database of contaminated properties, but the United States Environmental Protection Agency had determined that no additional testing or clean-up was required. At that time Citation Homes owned 206 acres (83 ha) of Roberts Landing and the State Lands Commission and the City of San Leandro owned 272 acres (110 ha).

After 15 years of planning and evaluation, the City of San Leandro approved a plan for the site submitted by Citation Homes in 1992. It proposed that 79 acres (32 ha) in the southeast of the site would be developed for housing, including 460 detached single family houses and about 220 townhomes. Citation's remaining 127 acres (51 ha) would be restored wetland habitat and open space, for use by the city in perpetuity. The Final Roberts Landing Mitigation and Monitoring Plan (MMP) was issued by Resource Management International in 1995. The mitigation plan would fill about 13.2 acres (5.3 ha) of low quality degraded wetlands for the housing zone, and would restore about 16 acres (6.5 ha) to wetland habitat. Tidal flows would be restored to about 118 acres (48 ha). The project would be complementary to the city's adjoining Shoreline Marshlands Enhancement Project. The restoration project involved cutting a series of culverts through the shoreline levees to let the tides flow, enlarging ditches so water could circulate freely and creating islands for wildlife. The marsh contained a unique area of sand dunes, which was preserved.

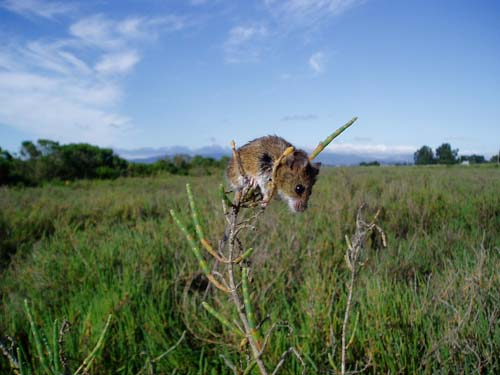
The salt marsh harvest mouse is an endangered species that is endemic to the San Francisco Bay.

As of 2001 all four of the Roberts Landing Slough tide gates were fully open, and all areas of the restored and enhanced marsh were receiving tidal inundations as planned. As predicted, the excavated tidal channels were evolving and developing hybrid cross-sections. However, only 63% of species were native marsh species, below target. As of 2016 the 370 acres (150 ha) San Leandro Shoreline Marshlands are one of the largest salt marshes in the region. The wetlands are west of Heron Bay / Marina Vista, south and east of the Monarch Bay Golf Club. The main plant species in the marshlands are natives such as Salicornia (pickleweed) and Spartina (cordgrass). They are home to shorebirds, waterfowl, songbirds and raptors, as well as fish, crustaceans and mammals, including some threatened or endangered species. The marshes are carefully monitored and managed to preserve the health of the ecology. As of 2010 the endangered Clapper rail and Salt marsh harvest mouse were present on the site.

The Export Facilities Pipeline was installed in 1979 to carry treated wastewater to the San Francisco Bay from the Tri-valley area. Most of it was rebuilt in 2002, apart from the 2,000 feet (610 m) Western Terminus at Roberts Landing. In March 2010 it was proposed to replace the old pipe in this section with new 1 metre (3 ft 3 in) high-density polyethelyne pipe. To minimize impact on the restored Bunker Marsh, the approach would use Horizontal Directional Drilling and then pull the pipe under the marsh.

The Bay Trail is a paved bicycle path that runs along the shoreline of the region, including a section through Roberts Landing. The 6.6 miles (10.6 km) route from Roberts Landing to Leandro's Marina Park and back is not busy and has benches where visitors can sit and watch the bay.

Part of the Landing is now the site of a housing estate. William Roberts' house, built in 1869 near to Four Corners (then the intersection of Main Street and Telegraph Street, now respectively renamed Lewelling Boulevard and Hesperian Boulevard), still stands, and is privately owned. It is just to the west of the freeway underpass that leads from Washington Avenue to Hesperian Boulevard.
