= M111 offensive hand grenade =

American hand grenade

M111
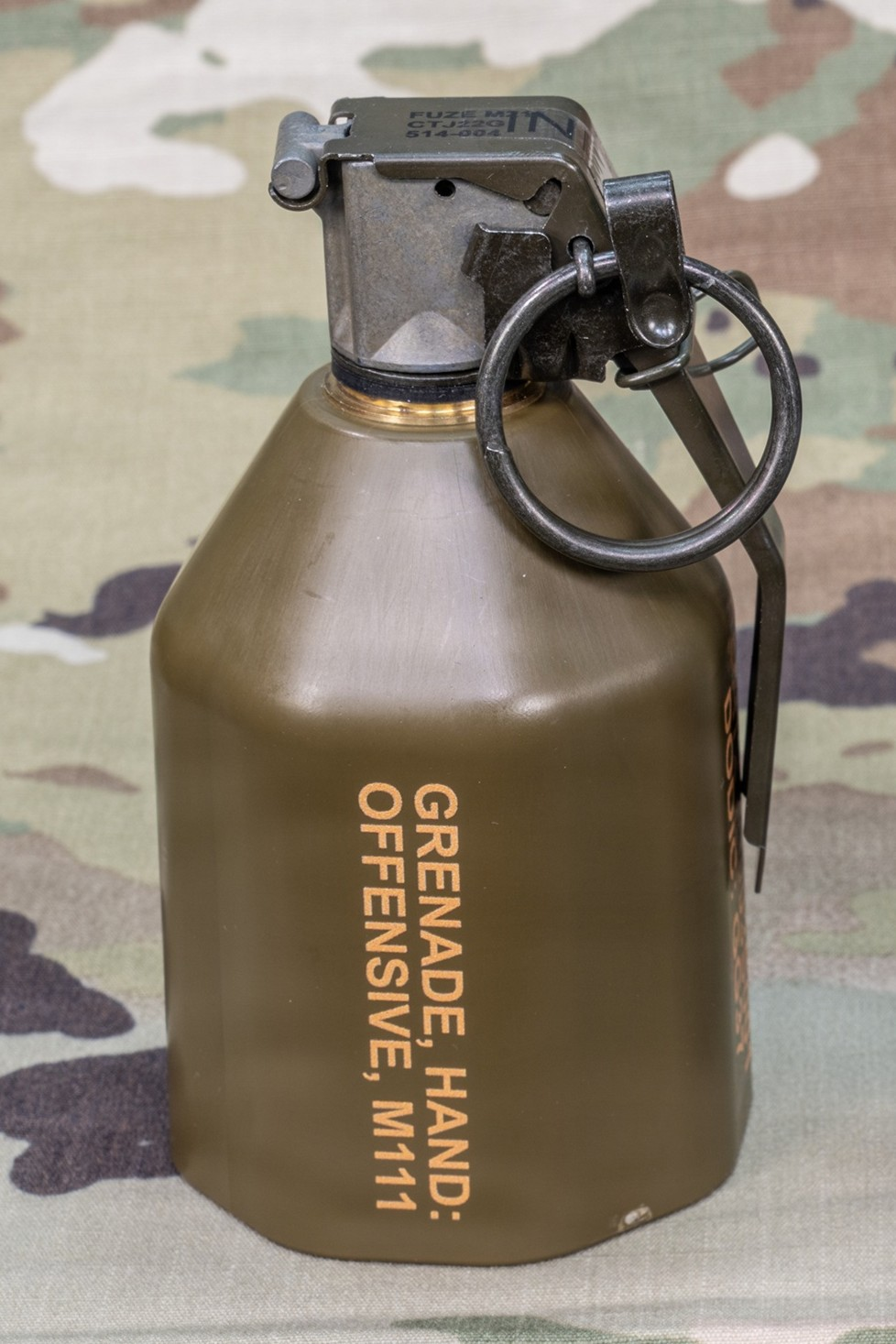
- M111 offensive hand grenade
- Type: Hand grenade
- Place of origin: United States

Service history
- In service: 2020–present
- Used by: United States Army

Production history
- Unit cost: $233.93 (cost in 2026)

Specifications
- Mass: 12.6 oz (360 g)
- Length: 4.41 in (112 mm)
- Diameter: 2.37 in (60 mm)
- Filling: PAX-3; Aluminized Comp-A3
- Detonation mechanism: M213 pyrotechnic delay fuze – 4.0 to 5.5 seconds

The M111 offensive hand grenade is designed to produce blast overpressure and concussion effects in enclosed spaces.

== History ==
The M111 was type classified in 2020 and had material release in 2025.

== Design ==
The M111 Offensive Hand Grenade (OHG) features a plastic, octagonal-shaped body designed to generate lethal blast overpressure effects that are particularly effective in indoor and close-combat environments where fragmentation is undesirable in order to reduce collateral damage.

Each grenade is filled with pressed PAX-3 explosive and fitted with an M213 pyrotechnic delay fuze that initiates the explosive charge. However, a U.S. Army article released in March 2026 includes images of the M111 OHG in which the explosive filling is labeled “Comp-A3 w/ Alum” on the body of the grenade.

The M111 OHG enhances soldier lethality by producing blast overpressures against enemy forces in confined spaces such as buildings, bunkers, trench lines, and tunnels. This capability increases the effectiveness and survivability of dismounted soldiers, enabling units to operate more efficiently and lethally. The M111 OHG is an environmentally friendly replacement for the MK3A2, which contains asbestos.

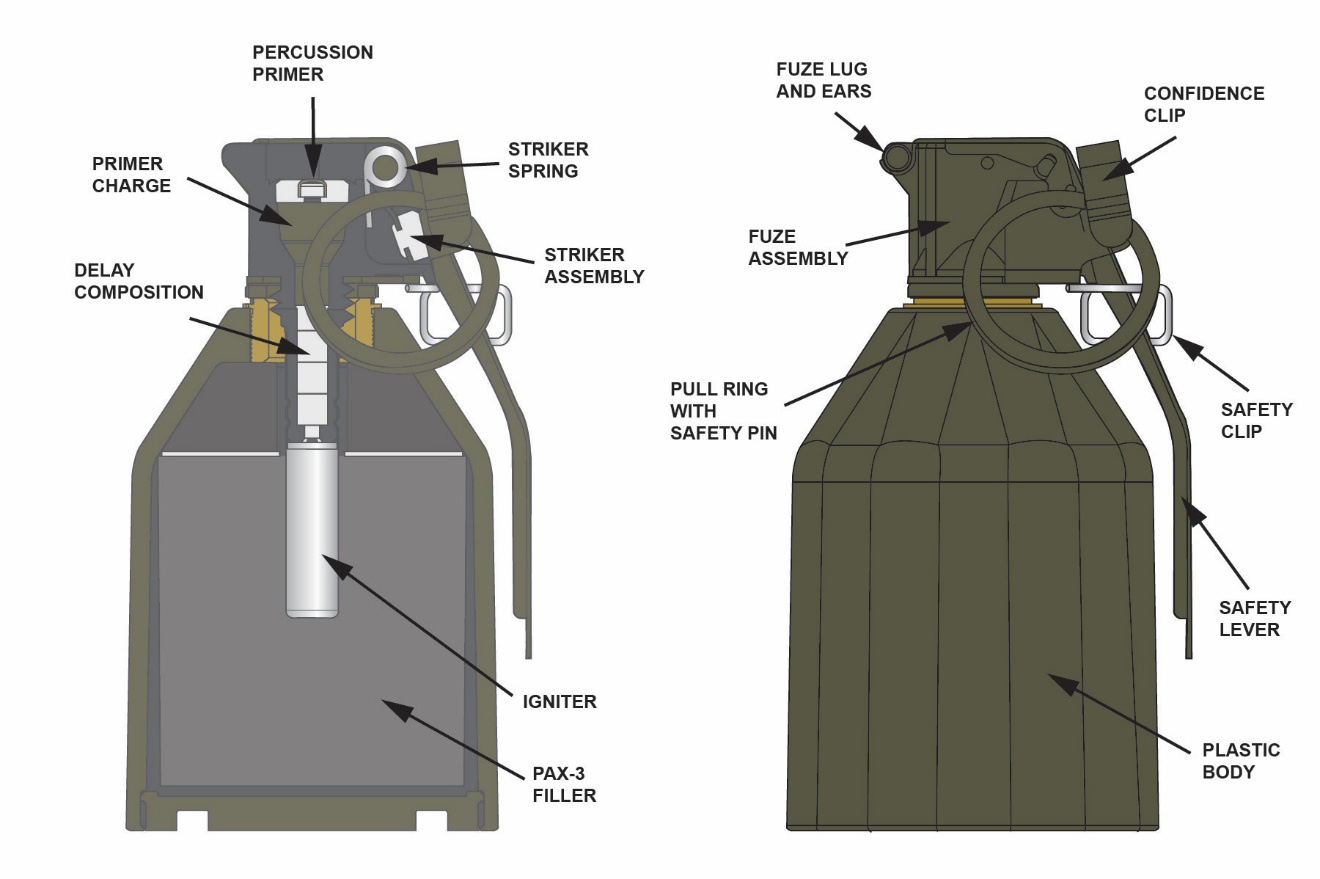
M111 OHG components

Before throwing the M111, the safety clip must first be released, the pull ring disengaged from the confidence clip, and the pull ring with the safety pin removed, allowing the safety lever to be released. When the grenade is thrown, the striker assembly, driven by spring action, ejects the safety lever and strikes the percussion primer, activating the primer charge. The primer charge ignites the delay composition, which burns for approximately 4.0 to 5.5 seconds. Once the delay composition has burned completely, it initiates the igniter, resulting in a high-order detonation. The force of the explosion then dissipates.

== Uses ==
The M111 Offensive Hand Grenade (OHG) is designed to generate blast overpressure in confined spaces to eliminate or subdue known enemy or hostile personnel within a target area.

Employment typically involves lobbing the grenade through open windows, mouse holes, or into confined enemy structures. In building environments, doorways are considered fatal funnels; therefore, when a known threat is present inside a room, the assault team should employ a grenade prior to entry to achieve surprise and enhance security. Entrances to underground passageways allow the M111 OHG to maximize its effectiveness in close, confined spaces; however, use in these environments presents significant risk to friendly forces due to blast overpressure effects. Suspected or likely enemy positions on stairwells can also be effectively suppressed using this special-purpose grenade.

The grenade may be delivered using either an underhand or overhand lobbing technique, depending on the situation.

== Variants ==
=== M112 ===
Practice version of the grenade.

== Adoption ==
The M111 will replace the MK3A2.

== Gallery ==
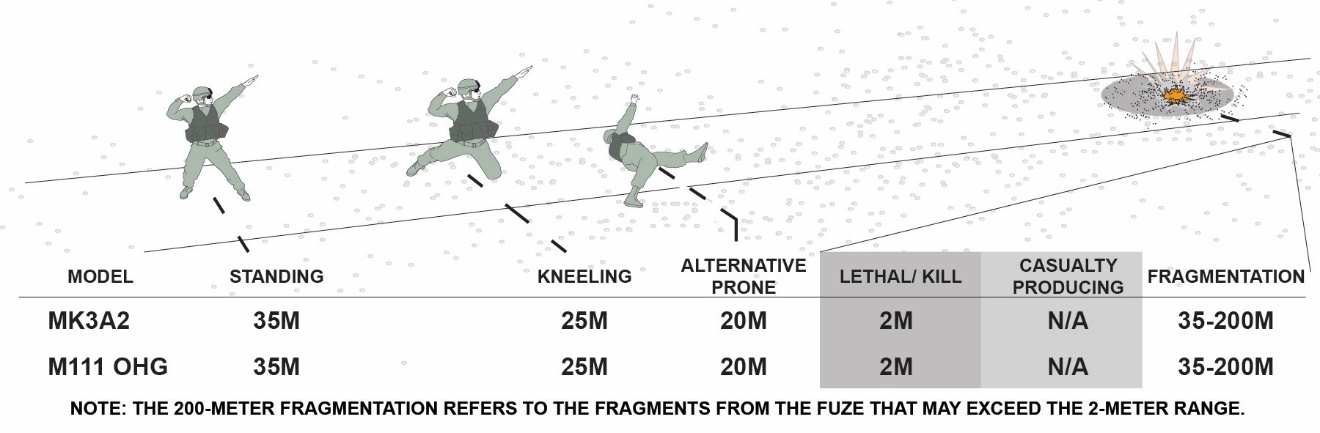
M111 range chart and diagram

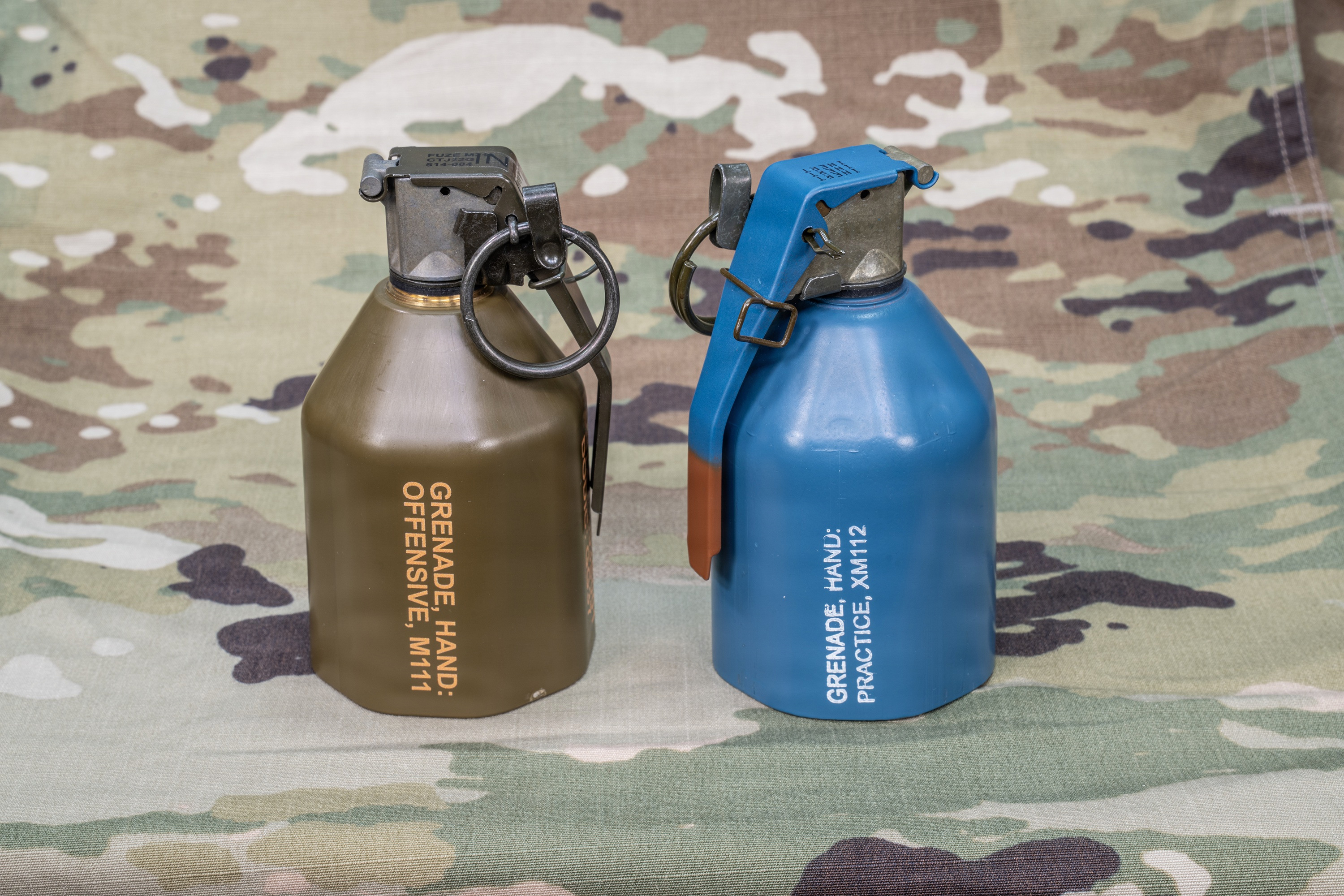
M111 OHG (left) and the M112 practice grenade (right)

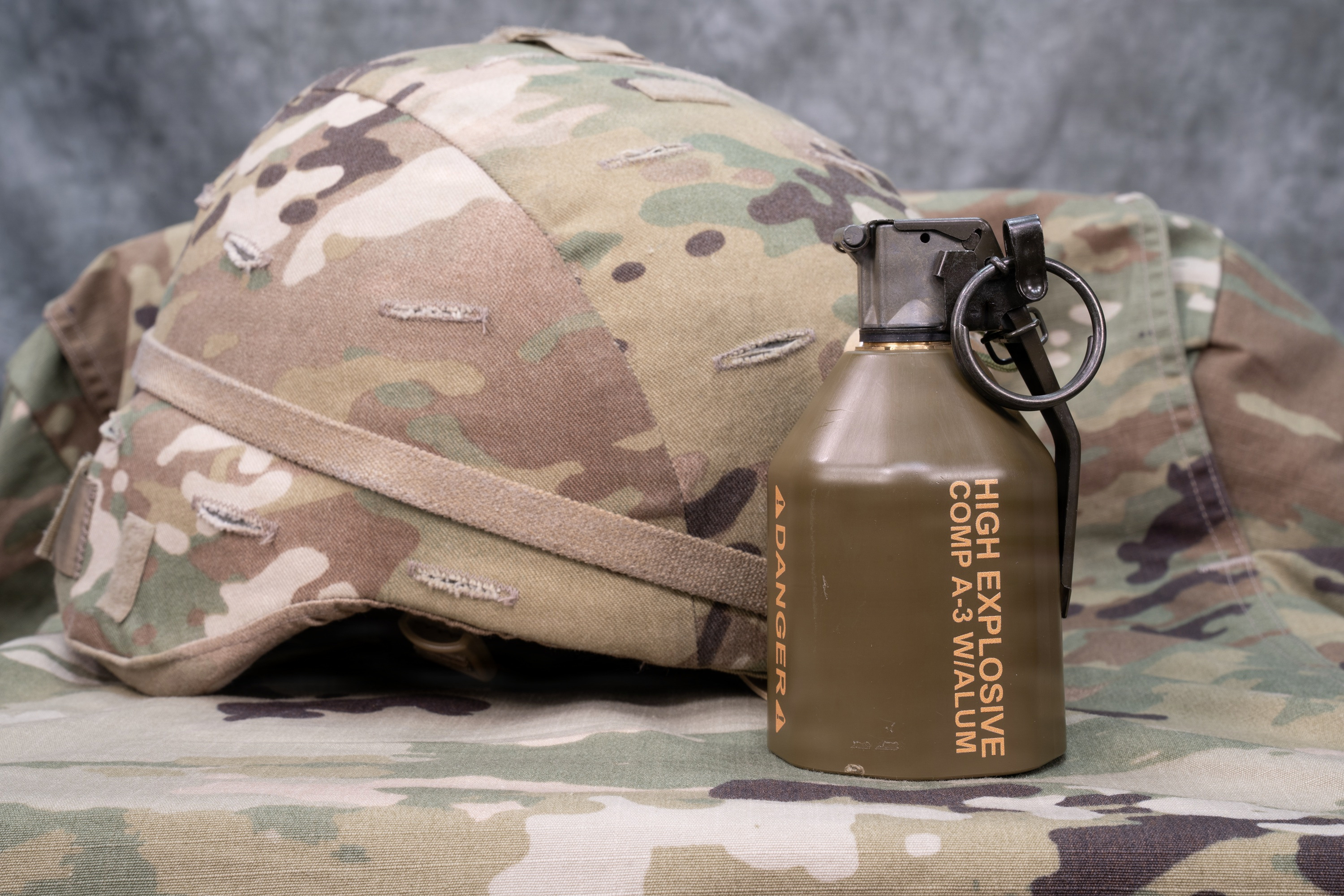
M111 filled with Comp-A3 w/ Alum
