= Trojan Powder Company =

American explosives manufacturer

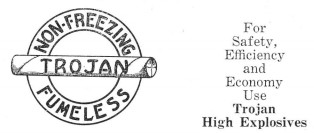
- Industry: Explosives manufacturing
- Founded: 1905 in Paulsboro, New Jersey, U.S.
- Founder: Jesse B. Bronstein
- Defunct: 1967
- Fate: Acquired
- Products: Explosive powder, other chemicals

The Trojan Powder Company was an American manufacturer of explosives founded in 1904 that made nitro-starch powder. It had a manufacturing complex in Allentown, Pennsylvania, and another facility at Roberts Landing near San Lorenzo, California.

The company thrived during World War I (1914–18), continued research and development in the interwar-period, and during World War II operated a large facility in Sandusky, Ohio, under contract to the army. After the war, production scaled back. A facility in Oregon was sold for use by the Trojan Nuclear Power Plant. In 1967, Trojan Powders became a division of Commercial Solvents Corporation (CSC). It was later acquired by the Ensign-Bickford Company.

== History ==
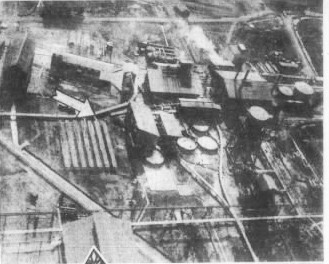
Roberts Landing plant c. 1922

Chemists F.B. Holmes and Jesse B. Bronstein discovered how to produce a stable nitrostarch while working at DuPont's Eastern Laboratories. Between 1905 and 1908, Holmes obtained various patents related to stabilization of nitrostarch powders. Because the powder did not contain glycerol, it would not freeze and was non-toxic.

The powder quickly became widely used for mining, tunneling and quarrying. General Harry C. Texler, a cement manufacturer and one of the organizers of Trojan, used the powder in large quantities. The Panama Canal project used huge quantities of nitrostarch. Walter O. Snelling, who became director of research at Trojan, worked for the U.S. Bureau of Mines on some aspects of the Panama Canal project, and invented a detonator that could be fired underwater.

J. B. Bronstein left DuPont and founded the Non-Freezing Powder Company in 1905. Bronstein was the first president of the company. He built a small-scale plant that produced some commercial explosives in Paulsboro, New Jersey. After a fire, the company relocated to Allentown, Pennsylvania as the Allentown Non-Freezing Powder Company. The company was incorporated in New Jersey on September 13, 1905 with 1,000 shares at a par value of $100 each. It built a commercial nitrostarch explosives manufacturing plant in Seiple, Pennsylvania, near Allentown The parent Trojan Safety Powder Company was incorporated in the State of New York in 1906, and became the Trojan Powder Company in 1907.

The Pacific High Explosives Company was incorporated in California on 25 April 1906, and built a plant at Roberts Landing in San Leandro, California to manufacture Trojan powder. This was the only western plant of the New York-based Trojan Powder Company. On November 23, 1906, most of the apparatus for the new Trojan powder works at Overton, eight miles north of Pueblo, Colorado had arrived. The buildings were almost completed and it was thought that the manufacture of powder would be started before 1 December. The products of the Trojan Powder Factory were shipped on the Southern Pacific railway from the San Lorenzo railroad station.

The Allentown subsidiary changed its name to the Pennsylvania Trojan Powder Company on 2 October 1909. In 1912, Pacific High Explosives reorganized as California Trojan Powder Company. In 1913 Trojan powder was provided to all primary lookouts in Rogue River National Forest for use in signaling when a fire was seen, assuming the phone lines were out of order. The signalling method was never put to the test, and a report on the experiment was highly skeptical about whether it would have worked. An advertisement on 17 May 1913 for the Trojan Powder Company of Allentown, PA. listed the principal sales offices as New York City, San Francisco, Salt Lake City, Denver and Portland, Oregon. The company had powder mills in Allentown, California. and Colorado.

=== World War I ===
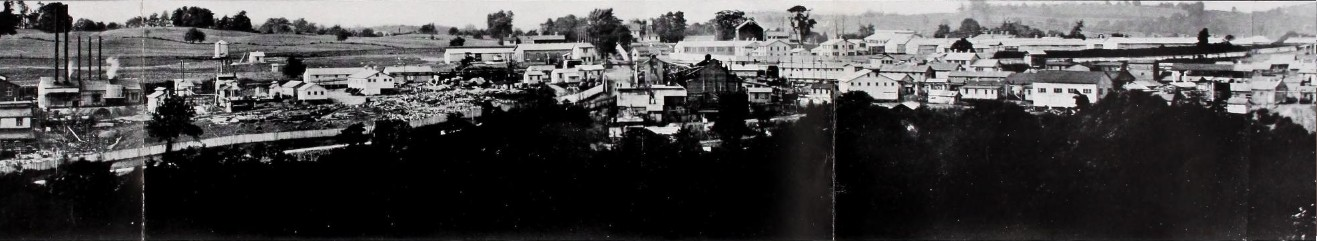
Panoramic view of the Trojan Powder Company plant near Allentown, Pennsylvania, c. 1918

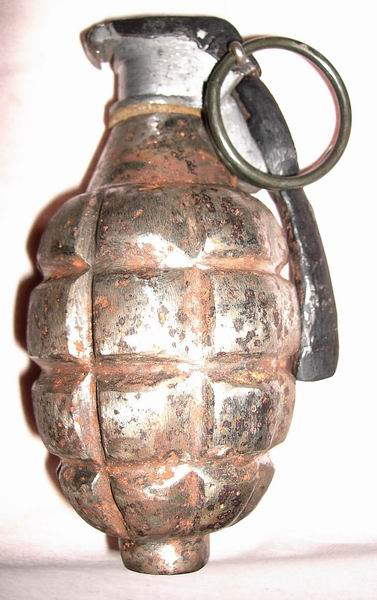
The Mk 1 grenade, used during World War I and later replaced by the Mk 2 grenade

During World War I (1914–18) the Trojan Chemical Company expanded the plant in Allentown to manufacture explosives and load them into grenades and mortar shells. The company prospered during the war. Trojan was one of a small number of explosives companies at the time, and obtained large orders from the British, French and Italians. Demand increased when the United States entered the war in 1917.

The haberdasher Thomas Koch (died 1915) was a member of the board of Pennsylvania Trojan Powder Company. In 1917 William E. Hall was president of the Trojan Powder Company, the Trojan Chemical Company and the Stackpole Carbon Company. Walter O. Snelling (1880–1965), a scientist with the U.S. Geological Survey (1907–10) and the Bureau of Mines (1910–12) joined the Trojan Powder Company in 1917 after a period of self-employment.

The Ordnance Department of the U.S. Army wanted to find an explosive that would be nearly as good as TNT for grenades. Tests summarized in a report of 3 December 1917 showed that the Trojan Explosive was in several ways superior to TNT. Trojan won the contract to make all the powder used in U.S. hand-grenades, and to load the powder into the grenades. The Pennsylvania Trojan Powder Company stepped up expansion of their plants in California and Pennsylvania to create the required capacity. By the time the Armistice was signed in November 1918 the company had the capacity to make over 50,000,000 pounds (23,000,000 kg) per year of Trojan Grenade Powder and Trojan Mortar Shell Explosive. Trojan also supplied powder for "airplane drop-bombs".

=== Inter-war period ===
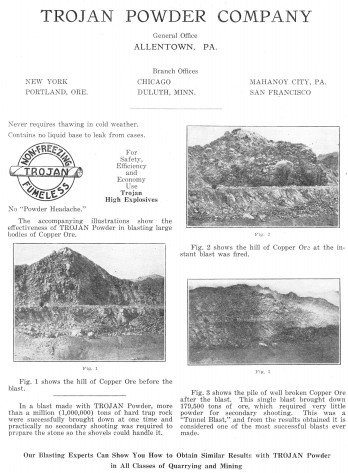
1921 Catalog Entry

After World War I, the eastern and western companies merged into the Trojan Powder Company, and continued to refine processes to manufacture a satisfactory stable product. A number of permissible nitrostarch-type compounds were approved by the Bureau of Mines. A 1929 letterhead listed offices in Allentown, New York, Chicago, San Francisco and Portland, Oregon.

In January 1936, Trojan supplied nitrostarch explosive for test to compare this to TNT for the purpose of demolishing obsolete concrete structures of the Tennessee Valley Authority in the Norris Dam area. The conclusion was that nitrostarch had similar performance to TNT at half the price. Although more expensive than dynamite, in some situations it could be a cost-effective alternative. Jesse B. Bronstein Jr., son of the founder, joined Trojan in 1937, and would become its president in 1961.

== World War II ==
In 1940, the Trojan Powder Company obtained a contract to operate the Plum Brook Ordnance Works in Sandusky, Ohio. Trojan operated the works from December 1941 to September 1945 during which period it produced over 1 billion pounds of nitroaromatic explosives. These included trinitrotoluene (TNT), dinitrotoluene (DNT), and pentolite. The factory operated around the clock, seven days a week throughout the remainder of the war. The United States Army Ordnance Department took back control of the site in December 1945 and started decontamination.

Snelling represented Trojan at Plum Brook. In 1942, he discovered the TNT could be used instead of silver salts to coat photographic paper. During World War II, Trojan was among the companies making pentaerythritol, a precursor to the explosive pentaerythritol tetranitrate. Snelling worked for Trojan until retiring in 1954.

=== Post-World War II ===
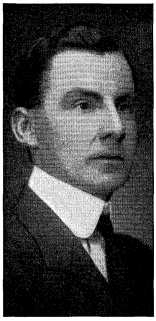
Walter O. Snelling directed research until 1954

After the war Trojan continued production of pentaerythritol, now used as a raw material for synthetic resins. On 7 January 1947 the New York Times reported that three ex-employees from the Sandusky plant were suing Trojan for $30 million in back pay plus damages on behalf of 10,000 workers.

Trojan Powder had a plant at 400 E. Highland Ave. in San Bernardino, California that was destroying in a forest fire in November 1956. Most of the explosives were removed before the fire reached the site.The San Bernardino plant was in operation as late as 1961. Trojan's Roberts Landing factory closed in 1964. Extensive clean-up of the contaminated soil was required before the site could be used for a residential development and restored marshlands. The Trojan Powder Works manufactured gunpowder and dynamite on a 634 acres (257 ha) site beside the Columbia River, a distance of 4 miles (6.4 km) from Rainier, Oregon. In 1967, Portland General Electric chose the site as the location of the Trojan Nuclear Power Plant.

Spanish Fork, Utah is about 4 miles (6.4 km) to the southeast of Springville. Trojan acquired a plant near the entrance to Spanish Fork Canyon, previously owned by Cytec Industries of Delaware and Mallinckdrodt Inc. of New York. Trojan produced nitrostarch there from 1964 to 1976. As of 1967 Trojan had 800 employees. Facilities included plants at Seiple, Pennsylvania, Wolf Lake, Illinois and Springville, Utah.

Trojan produced formaldehyde, pentaerythritol, polyols used in alkyd resins, synthetic drying oils, vinyl stabilizers, fire retardant coatings, organic nitrates used in rocket propellants, and inorganic chemicals for various purposes.

== Takeover and legacy ==
On September 1, 1967 Commercial Solvents Corporation (CSC) completed a purchase of Trojan Powder, which became a division of CSC. The sale had been agreed in principle on 6 July 1967 by CSC President Robert C. Wheeler and Trojan Powder President Jesse B. Bronstein Jr., who continued as president of the new division. CSC said the Trojan products would be complementary to those of its McWhorter Chemicals division and U. S. Powder Company division. CSC was merged into International Minerals and Chemical Company (IMC) in 1975.

The Wolf Lake plant in Union County, Illinois had about 100 employees in the early 1980s, but was shut down in 1982. Ensign-Bickford bought it in 1988, and it had 240 employees by 1992. Ensign-Bickford had bought the Spanish Fork Plant operations from the Trojan Corporation on 24 December 1986. The Trojan Corporation was fully merged into the Ensign-Bickford Company on 1 January 1996. The 480 acres (190 ha) explosive plant at the entrance to Spanish Fork Canyon in Utah had contaminated the groundwater and soil. Ensign-Bickford closed the Spanish Fork plant in 2006 and began clean-up in preparation for a mixed-used development with 1,000 homes.

The Trojan Powder Company Building at 17-19 North 7th Street, Allentown was an 11-story steel frame building with a brick facade, completed in 1911. This building and the adjacent Allentown National Bank were abandoned by the 1990s and remained empty until 2005, when they opened as a unified senior living apartment complex.

== Explosions ==
The company experienced a number of explosions, all apparently accidental.

1907	Henry Jorgensen died in an explosion in the Roberts Landing factory, He was buried in the San Lorenzo, California Pioneer Cemetery.
1910	On 17 February 1910, the Trojan Powder Works at Roberts Landing, California blew up just before 11:00 a.m. Five men were killed at once and three died later at the county infirmary. There were two small, sharp explosions, then a huge explosion so powerful it broke all the windows in the San Leandro School, 2 miles (3.2 km) away.
1916	The Penn Trojan Powder Company, at Iron Bridge, near Allentown, covered several hundred acres and held nine 15 by 30 feet (4.6 by 9.1 m) sheet iron drying building. Every morning and every evening the buildings were loaded with 1,000 pounds (450 kg) of wet dynamite composition. Hot air forced into the sheds would dry the composition over a period of 12 hours. On 9 December 1916 there was an explosion at the Iron Bridge plant, and three men were killed.
1918	On 14 August 1918, there was an explosion at the Trojan dryer building in the Seiple plant, South Whitehall Township, Pennsylvania that killed five men. The cause was not determined.
1922	On 5 January 1922, the Oakland Tribune reported that the previous day two massive explosives had killed four employees at the Trojan Powder Works in Roberts Landing. The storehouses and dryer had been reduced to piles of splintered wood. Windows were broken in nearby houses.
1940	On 12 November 1940, three workers were killed by an explosion at the cap-packing shed in the Seiple plant. The men were working in the one-story building making detonators for blasting at the time of the explosion. The company said they did not suspect sabotage, since the work was not related to defense.
1963	On 16 March 1963, three men were killed in an explosion at the Seiple plant.
2005	In August 2005, a truck coming from the Trojan plant at Spanish Fork Canyon, Utah blew up and created a huge crater in Highway 6.

== Sources ==
- "3 Blown to Bits; Other Explosion Fatal to 8" (PDF), The Brainerd Daily Dispatch, 12 November 1940
- Adams, Jane H. (1994), The Transformation of Rural Life: Southern Illinois, 1890–1990, Univ of North Carolina Press, ISBN 978-0-8078-4479-3
- Agreed Order No. DE 9514, 2013
- Alexander, Nancy (17 July 2014), "The Trojan Powder Company", Highland Community News
- "Allentown Center Square", Emporis, archived from the original on July 5, 2016
- Allentown Center Square, Pennrose
- "Ask $15,000,000 Back Pay; Trojan Powder Ex-Workers Put In 10-Hour-a-Day Bill", The New York Times, 7 January 1947
- Breen, William J. (1997), Labor Market Politics and the Great War: The Department of Labor, the States, and the First U.S. Employment Service, 1907–1933, Kent State University Press, ISBN 978-0-87338-559-6
- Brown, Carroll E. (1985), History of the Rogue River National Forest, Department of Agriculture
- "Colorado News Items", Walsenburg World, XVIII (94), 23 November 1906 – via CHNC
- Corporations of New Jersey, Trenton, NJ: The Secretary of State, 1914
- Corrective Action Order No. 0507019 (PDF), Utah Solid and Hazardous Waste Control Board, 2005
- "CSC Purchases Trojan Powder", The Monroe News-Star, Monroe, Louisiana, 1 September 1967
- "Eight Blown To Awful Death", San Francisco Call, 107 (80), 18 February 1910
- Evans, W.H. (9 June 1944), "Evans Relates Interesting History of Trojan Company In Talk For Local Groups", The Sandusky Register, Sandusky, Ohio – via newspapers.com
- Former Plum Brook Ordnance Works, Sandusky, Ohio (Currently NASA Plum Brook Station) (PDF), USACE Huntington, November 2015, archived from the original (PDF) on December 27, 2016
- Gustaitis, Rasa (31 August 2012), San Francisco Bay Shoreline Guide: A State Coastal Conservancy Book: Access Maps to the Entire San Francisco Bay Trail, Univ of California Press, ISBN 978-0-520-27436-5
- Trojan Chemical Company loading plant, war workers, plant officials, and employees panoramic photograph, Hagley Museum and Library: Audiovisual Collections and Digital Initiatives Department, 1969
- Jones, Carolyn (10 October 2014), "Eeriest place in Bay Area: A place of death in San Lorenzo", SFGATE
- Linkswiler, Gilbert E. (July–August 1936), "Demolition Tests in the Tennessee Valley", The Military Engineer, 28 (160), Society of American Military Engineers: 266–268, JSTOR 44563785
- Johnson, Howard C. E. (June 1947), "Glycerine and Glycols Gain Ground", Scientific American, 176 (6): 259–261, Bibcode:1947SciAm.176..259J, doi:10.1038/scientificamerican0647-259, JSTOR 24960712
- Mangravite, Andrew (2008), Papers of Walter O. Snelling (PDF), Philadelphia: Chemical Heritage Foundation Archives
- Mangravite, Andrew (28 April 2016), Visual Evidence: An unusual relic from CHF's archives offers a fuller picture of a chemist's life and work, Science History Institute
- Ranvestel, Anthony W.; Burr, Brooks M. (2004), "Conservation Assessment for Bluehead Shiner (Pteronotropis hubbsi)" (PDF), American Currents, 30 (1)
- Reichman, Matt (3 June 2010), "State nears OK on explosives plant cleanup in Spanish Fork", Daily Herald, Provo, Utah
- Rodger (17 November 2003), "Suit decries Mapleton pollution pact, Mapleton leaders say explosives residue still threat", Deseret News Utah, archived from the original on August 5, 2019
- "6 Open Space, Parks and Conservation", San Leandro city plan, City of San Leandro, 19 September 2016
- "Spanish Fork Explosives Company To Shutdown", ksl.com, 18 September 2005
- Stock, Jody; Corbett, Michael (July 2000), Unincorporated San Lorenzo Historical Building Survey, County of Alameda, archived from the original on August 26, 2011
- Teitel, Amy Shira (19 March 2019), "The Women's Guide to ID Badge Placement (According to the Government in 1947)", Discover Magazine
- "Three Men Killed: Blown to Pieces in Powder Explosion Saturday Near Allentown", The Wellsboro Agitator, Pennsylvania, 13 December 1916
- "Trojan Powder Company", The Allentown Leader, Allentown, Pennsylvania, 17 May 1913 – via newspapers.com
- "Trojan Powder Company, San Francisco (Fletcher supplier)", Ed Fletcher Papers 1870-1955 MSS.81 Box: 31 Folder: 3, US San Diego
- "Two Terrific Eastbay Explosions Kill Four Employees at Trojan Powder Co's Plant", Oakland Tribune, Oakland, California, 5 June 1922
- Utah Atlas & Gazetteer (9 ed.), DeLorme, 2014, ISBN 9780899332550
- Van Gelder, Arthur Pine; Schlatter, Hugo (1927), "History of the Explosives Industry in America", Nature, 122 (3081), Columbia University Press: 765, Bibcode:1928Natur.122..765., doi:10.1038/122765a0, hdl:2027/mdp.39015010473992, S2CID 19949823
- West, Robert D. (16 May 2014), Trojan in Twilight: History
- Whelan, Frank (23 February 1999), "Explosions Pepper Valley's History", The Morning Call
- Whelan, Frank (16 March 2019), "History's Headlines: Getting 'rigged out' at Koch Brothers", WFMZ TV
- Williams, William Bradford (1919), History of the manufacture of explosives for the Great War, 1917–1918, United States. Army. Ordnance Dept
