= Oppo F1 =

Android smartphone by Oppo Electronics

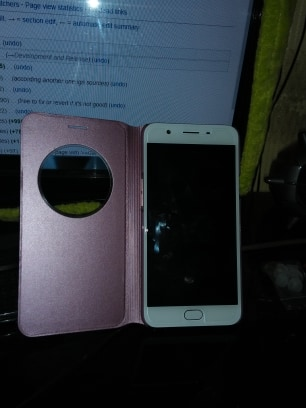
- Oppo F1
- Brand: Oppo
- Manufacturer: Oppo
- Type: Smartphone
- Series: F series
- First released: January 2016; 10 years ago
- Successor: Oppo F1s
- Dimensions: 143.5 mm (5.65 in) H 71 mm (2.8 in) W 7.3 mm (0.29 in) D
- Weight: 134 g (4.7 oz)
- Operating system: Android 5.1 (Lollipop) with ColorOS 2.1
- System-on-chip: Qualcomm Snapdragon 616
- CPU: 1.5 GHz Octa Core
- GPU: Adreno 405
- Memory: 3GB RAM
- Storage: 16GB
- Removable storage: microSD, up to 256 GB
- Battery: Non-removable Li-Po 2,500 mAh
- Rear camera: 13MP
- Front camera: 8MP
- Display: 5 in (130 mm)
- Data inputs: Touchscreen
- Codename: A1601
- SAR: 0.13 W/kg (head); 0.34 W/kg (body)
- Website: www.oppo.com/en/smartphone-f1/

The Oppo F1 is an Android smartphone manufactured by Oppo Electronics that was released in January 2016. The phone features a 5 in (130 mm) touchscreen display, Android 5.1 (Lollipop) operating system, and microSD card support up to 256 GB. It is the first phone in Oppo's F series.

== Specifications ==
=== Hardware ===
The Oppo F1 has a 5 in (130 mm) touchscreen display with 720 × 1280 resolution. It has a 13 MP main camera and an 8 MP selfie camera, along with a Screen Flash feature that lights up the screen to light up selfies. The phone comes with 16 GB of internal storage, 3 GB of RAM, and expandable storage up to 256 GB via a microSD card. It also has a Snapdragon 616 CPU. The phone itself measures 143.5 mm (5.65 in) X 71 mm (2.8 in) X 7.3 mm (0.29 in) and weighs 134 g (4.7 oz).

=== Battery ===
The Oppo F1 has a non-removable 2500 mAh Li-Po battery. Charging is facilitated via the device's microUSB 2.0 port.

=== Software ===
The Oppo F1 came with Android 5.1 (Lollipop) with ColorOS 2.1.

== See also ==
- List of Oppo products
- Android (operating system)
