= Open Camera =

Open source camera app for Android devices

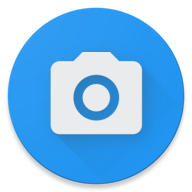

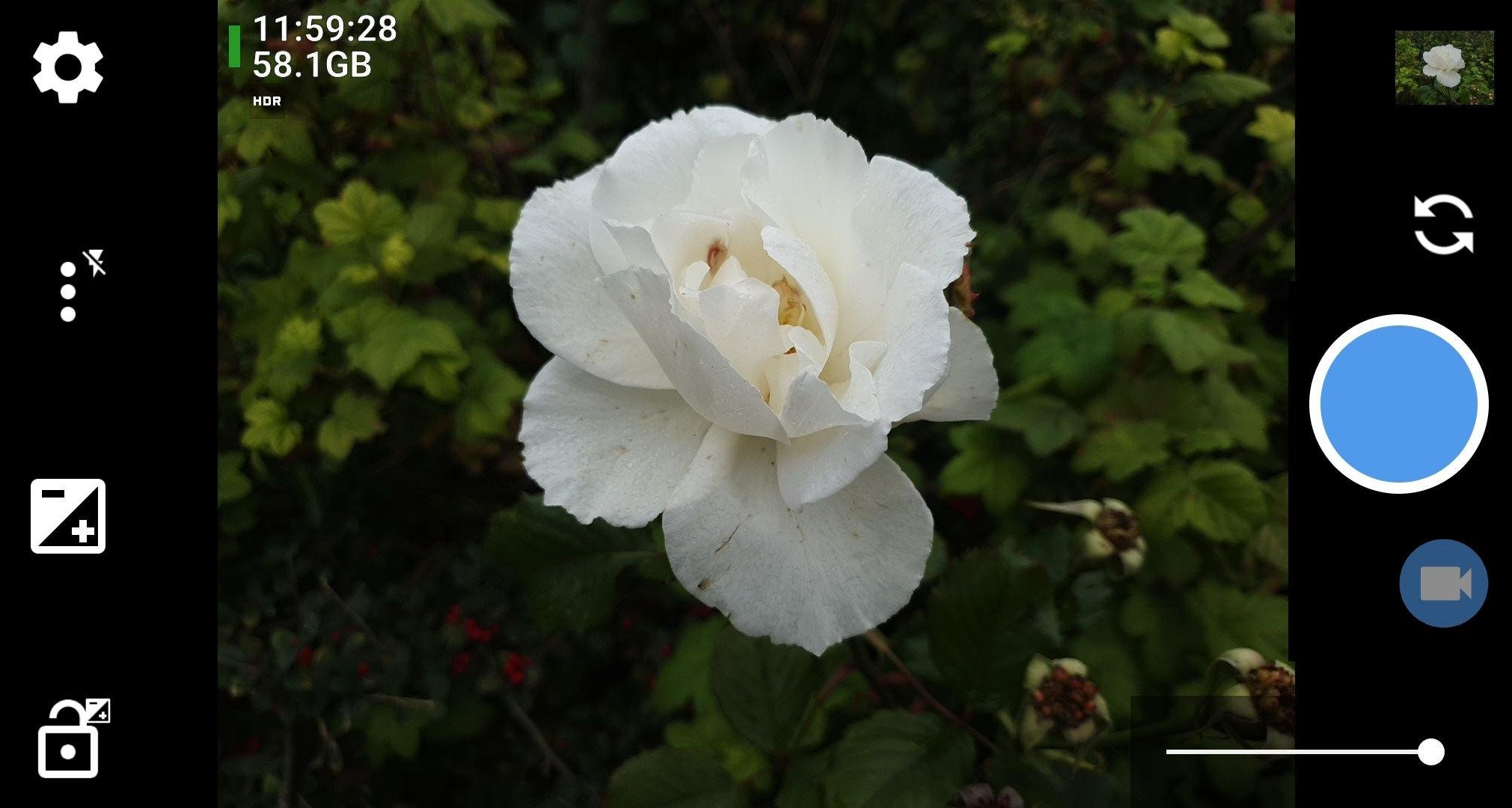
- Original author: Mark Harman
- Written in: Java
- Operating system: Android
- Service name: net.sourceforge.opencamera
- Type: Camera app
- License: GNU General Public License 3
- Website: opencamera.org.uk
- Repository: sourceforge.net/p/opencamera/code

Open Camera is an Android application for using the phone's built-in camera published under the free software license GPL v3.0 or later.

== Features ==
Features include:

- "Auto-leveling" photographs,
- Remote photo taking using sound-based activation,
- Changing photo and video file name prefixes,
- Image and video quality and format options,
- Custom Exif tags,
- Customisable photo stamping,
- Exposure locking,
- A variety of photo modes (STD, DRO, HDR, PANO, EXPO {}),
- Flash photography, including the use of screen flashes for front-facing camera photographs,
- Setting a maximum duration limit for videos

== Requirements ==
Open Camera requires Android 4.0.3 or later.

== See also ==
- List of free and open-source Android applications
