= F1 Magazine =

Syrian computer magazine

F1 Magazine - مجلة إف 1
- The F1 Magazine logo.
- Categories: Computer magazine
- Frequency: Monthly
- First issue: April 2006
- Country: Syria
- Language: Arabic
- Website: http://www.f1-mag.com/

F1 Magazine is a Syrian monthly computer magazine published in Arabic, which launched in April 2006. F1 Magazine is the first tutorials based Magazine in the Middle East. Its policy concentrates on tutorials, using the How to concept.

== Background of the name ==
Keyboard makers and software companies used a specific keyboard button to refer to the software documentation and help. The key is often F1, hence the name.

F1 Magazine used this keyboard button to indicate to its policy, which is "trying to help".

== F1 Magazine Index ==
In F1 Magazine, readers can find :

- Programs
- Internet & Networking
- Hacking & Security
- Handheld Devices
- Programming
- Multimedia
- VIPs in Computers
- Hobbyist Laboratory
- Concepts & Principles
- Games (often features the making of games)
- System maintenance & Technical Support
- Apple Macintosh

== F1 Services ==
In its 4th Issue F1 Magazine announced for the first time for F1 TV, the Official Podcast of F1 TV which was the first Arabian Video Podcast that provides Computer Tutorials.

Each Episode of F1 TV contains :

1. Technology News
2. Video Games Trailers
3. Computer tips & Tricks

In addition to F1 TV, F1 Magazine launched two additional Free Services which are :

1- Arabic Font Office : Free service allows to write your name using different types of Arabic Font.

F1 Magazine Google Video Downloader

2- Google Video Downloader : Free service allows to download video files from Google Video in different types : MP4, Flash Video(Flv) and AVI.
