= 2009 California Proposition 1F =

Proposition 1F
- May 19, 2009
- Elected Officials Salaries

Results
Choice	Votes	%
Yes	3,565,419	74.23%
No	1,237,694	25.77%
Total votes	4,803,113	100.00%
County results
For
80–90%
70–80%
60–70%

2009 California Proposition 1F, also known as Senate Constitutional Amendment 8, was a measure approved by California voters relating to the salaries of state officers. It was an amendment of the Constitution of California prohibiting pay raises for members of the State Legislature, the Governor, and other state officials during deficit years. It was proposed by the legislature and approved in a referendum held as part of the May 19, 2009 special election ballot, in which the California electorate also voted on five other propositions.

== Background ==
In February 2009, the State Legislature narrowly passed the 2008–2009 state budget during a special session, months after it was due. As part of the plan to lower the state's annual deficits, the State Legislature ordered a special election with various budget reform ballot propositions, among them Proposition 1F.

The measure was proposed by the State Legislature as a joint resolution called Senate Constitutional Amendment 8 of the 2009–10 Regular Session (Resolution Chapter 3, Statutes of 2009). It was authored by Senator Abel Maldonado, a Republican from Santa Maria, and passed both houses unanimously. The legislature later voted in an extraordinary session to submit the amendment and five other proposals to a special election held in May. The other propositions were all rejected by voters.

== Provisions ==
The measure amended Article III, Section 8 of the California constitution, which concerns the Citizens Compensation Commission. The amendment prohibits the commission, which sets salary levels for the governor, other top state officials, and members of the California State Legislature, from increasing those salaries if the state General Fund is expected to end the year with a deficit. Specifically, if the state's Director of Finance reports that there will be a negative balance in the Special Fund for Economic Uncertainties at the end of that fiscal year. While there would be a financial benefit to the state, such savings would be minimal. The introduction to the amendment states that

Existing provisions of the California Constitution direct the California Citizens Compensation Commission to establish and adjust the salary and benefits for Members of the Legislature and certain other state officers. This measure would prohibit the commission from adopting in a fiscal year a resolution that would increase the salary of Members of the Legislature or other state officers if the Director of Finance determines that there will be a negative balance in the Special Fund for Economic Uncertainties at the end of that fiscal year.

== Results ==
Proposition 1F
Choice	Votes	%
For	3,565,419	74.23
Against	1,237,694	25.77
Total	4,803,113	100.00
Valid votes	4,803,113	98.59
Invalid/blank votes	68,832	1.41
Total votes	4,871,945	100.00
Registered voters/turnout	17,153,012	28.40

== See also ==
- Legislative referral
