= F1 grenade =

F1 grenade may refer to:

- F1 grenade (Australia)
- F1 grenade (France)
- F-1 grenade (Russia)
