= Nitrostarch =

Identifiers

Properties
Chemical formula	(C_{6}H_{7}N_{3}O_{11})_{n}
Appearance	Light yellow powder
Solubility in water	Insoluble
Solubility	Soluble in ethanol, diethyl ether, acetone, chloroform, ethyl acetate, nitric acid

Thermochemistry
Heat of combustion, higher value (HHV)	10797.65 J/g
Heat of combustion, lower value (LHV)	9279.69 J/g

Related compounds
Related compounds	Starch; Nitrocellulose
- Except where otherwise noted, data are given for materials in their standard state (at 25 °C [77 °F], 100 kPa). Infobox references

Nitrostarch is a secondary explosive similar to nitrocellulose. Much like starch, it is made up of two components, nitrated amylose and nitrated amylopectin. Nitrated amylopectin generally has a greater solubility than amylose; however, it is less stable than nitrated amylose.

The solubility, detonation velocity, and impact sensitivity depend heavily on the level of nitration.

== Synthesis ==
Nitrostarch is made by dissolving starch in red fuming nitric acid. It is then precipitated by adding the solution to concentrated sulfuric acid.

Nitrostarch can be stabilized by refluxing it in ethanol to drive off the left over nitric acid.

== History ==
Nitrostarch was first discovered by French chemist and pharmacist Henri Braconnot.

Franz von Uchatius formulated an early smokless propellant out of Nitrated starch, but it was not adopted due to superiority of nitrocellulose based competitors.

After stabilizers (such as ammonium oxalate) were devised in the early 1900s to prolong its shelf life, it was started to be used as an industrial explosive.

During World War I, it was used as a filler in hand grenades. The Trojan Powder Company and DuPont produced the Trojan grenade powder—an explosive that cannot be cast or melted containing 40% of nitrostarch mixed with ammonium nitrate, sodium nitrate, or similar nitrates—as substitute filler.
