= Diehl (company) =

German corporate group

Diehl Stiftung & Co. KG
- Type: Stiftung & Co. KG
- Industry: Domestic appliance industry, aviation equipment, defence technology, electronic control systems, measuring instrument technology
- Founded: 1902
- Headquarters: Nuremberg, Germany
- Area served: Worldwide
- Key people: Jürgen Reimer; Jens Böhlke; Christof Bosbach; Dieter Landgraf; Helmut Rauch; Jörg Schuler; Carsten Wolff; Markus Diehl (Chairman of the Supervisory Board)
- Revenue: €3.9 billion (2023)
- Number of employees: 16,779 (2023)
- Website: diehl.com

Diehl Stiftung & Co. KG is a German corporate group headquartered in Nuremberg. It is owned by seven members of the Diehl family.

The group is divided into five corporate divisions. In 2023, the largest business segment by revenue was the Defence division (29.4%). Other segments are Aviation (27.1%), Metal (20.7%), Controls (11.5%) and Metering (11.3%).

== History ==
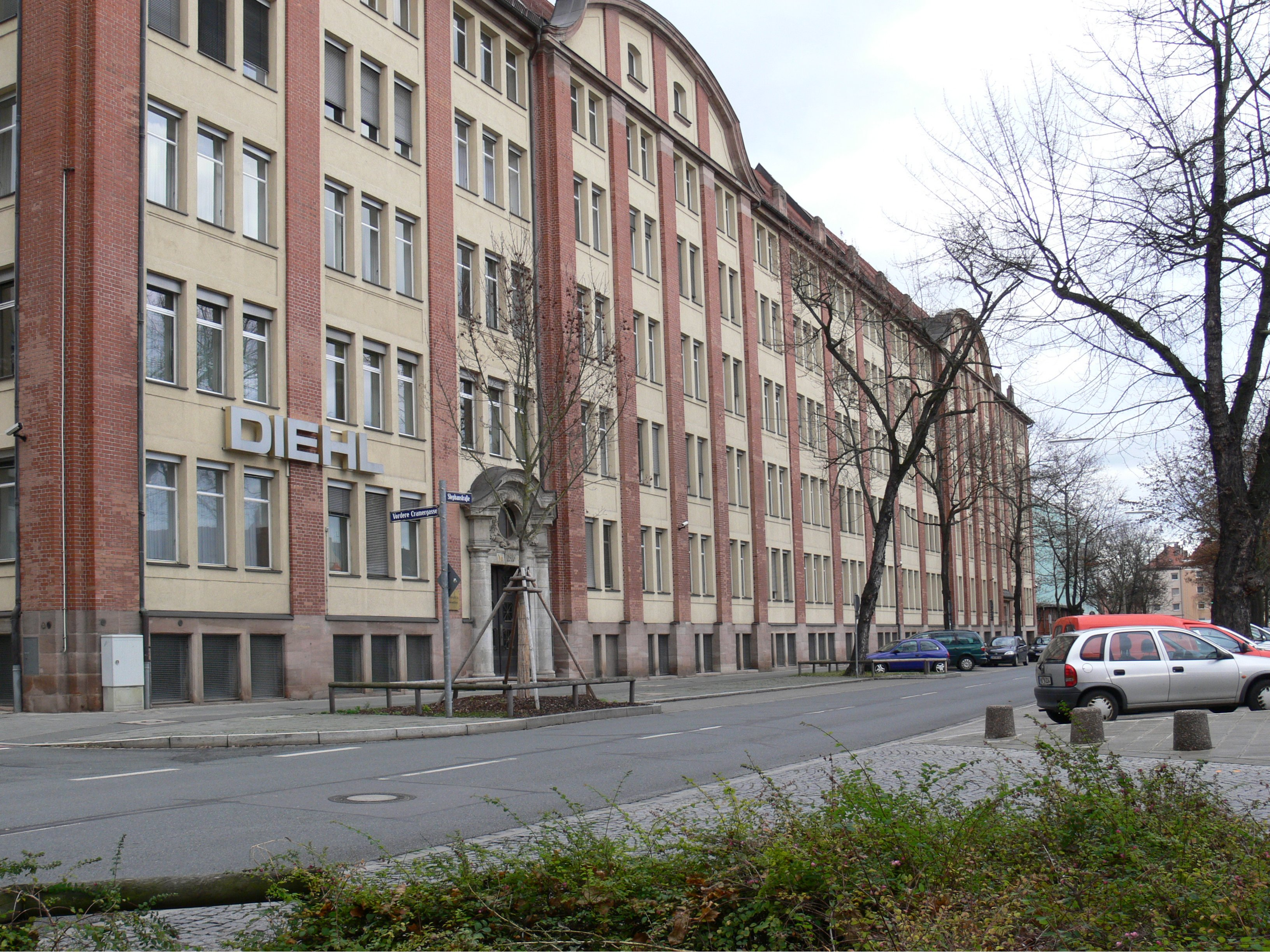
Diehl headquarters in Nuremberg (2006)

=== Founding years ===
The company was founded on 5 September 1902 in Nuremberg by Margarete, née Schmidt (born 25 August 1880 in Nuremberg; †1953), and Heinrich Diehl (born 3 August 1878 in Kölschhausen; †1938 in Nuremberg) as an art forge. In 1906, the business was expanded through the acquisition of the art foundry Brand. In addition to the foundry and a processing workshop, the production program thus included fittings, door handles and art castings. A trading department for architectural fittings was also established. After relocation in 1907, the company had 30 employees.

=== World War I and II ===
At the outbreak of World War I, production was shifted from art casting to the casting of brass bars. These were forged into blanks for ammunition production in the company's own drop forge, marking the beginning of Diehl's production of semi-finished metal products.

After Heinrich Diehl was drafted into military service during the war, Margarete Diehl took over sole management of the business. A power of attorney was entered in the Nuremberg commercial register in the name of ‘Grete Diehl, wife of the art foundry owner’ (Kunstgießereibesitzersehefrau).

Karl Diehl joined the company in 1930 after completing his studies as a graduate engineer. In 1933, he became a member of the NSDAP (membership number 2,714,742). Following the death of Heinrich Diehl in 1938, Karl and his mother took over the management of the company, which by then employed 2,800 people.

In later years, the company commissioned independent historians to examine the events of the war period, resulting in a popular-scientific company biography. An air raid in August 1942 destroyed part of the production facilities, and as the war went on, almost all the buildings in Röthenbach an der Pegnitz were destroyed or severely damaged.

=== Reconstruction and expansion ===
Diehl alarm clock (approx. 1955), still purely mechanical

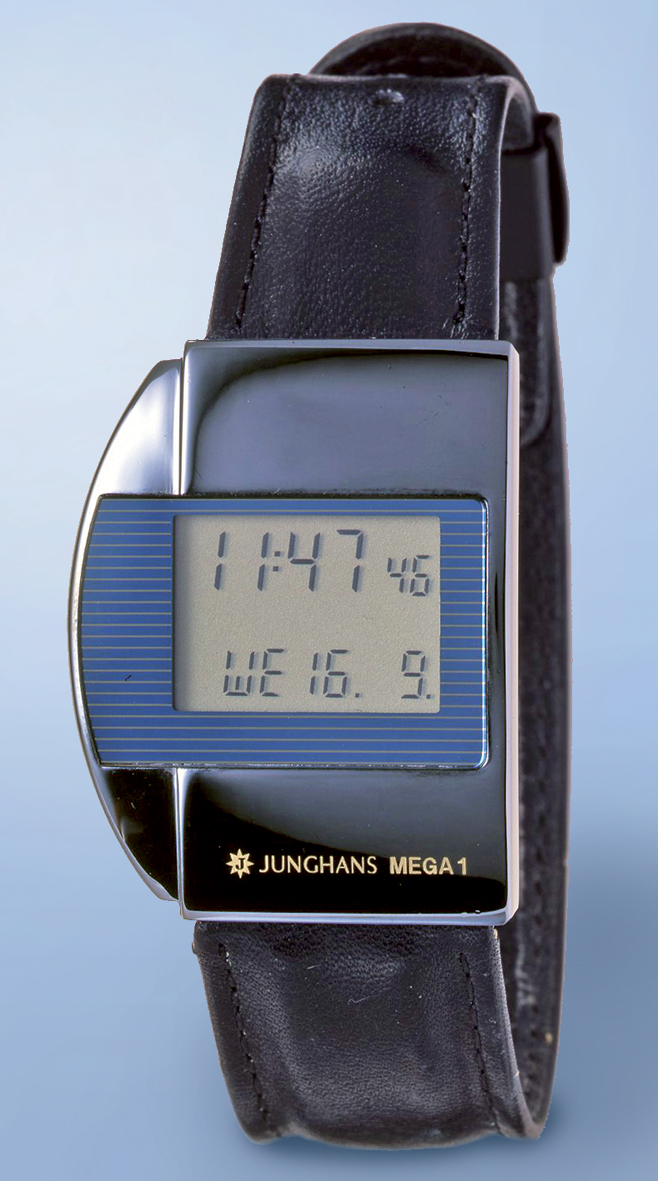
Junghans Mega 1 (digital)

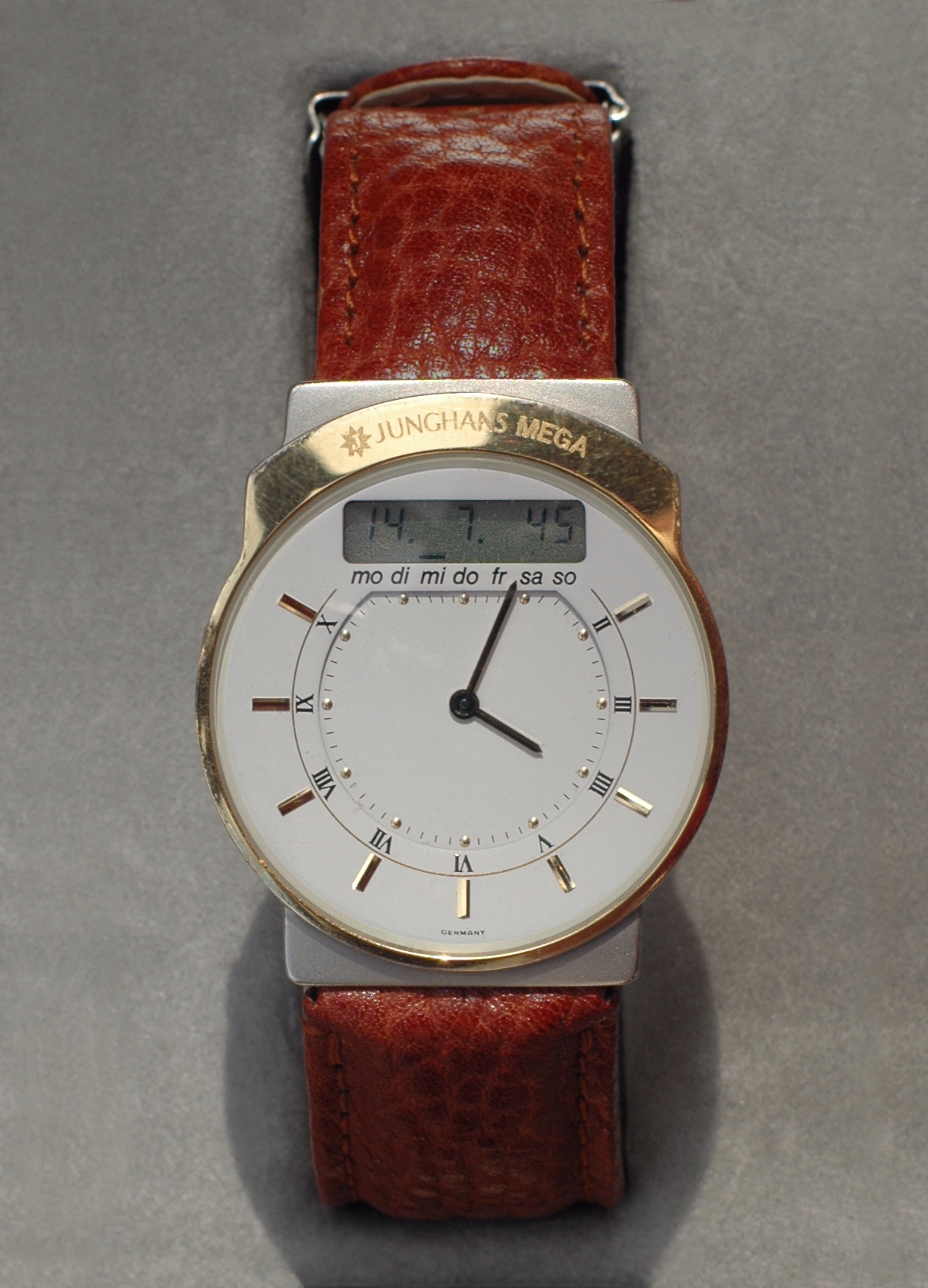
Junghans Mega (analogue)

After World War II, Diehl remained active in the munitions business and expanded into missile production. Despite the decline in defence spending following the Cold War, the company continued to invest in its own developments.

Precision engineering production was also resumed after World War II. In addition to manufacturing its own clocks, Diehl received a commission from a domestic appliance manufacturer to combine clock technology with switching mechanisms.

Despite its own success in the clock-making sector, Diehl acquired a majority shareholding in Junghans AG in 1956, which at that time was the largest watch factory in Europe. All watchmaking activities were consolidated at a single site.

After the establishment of the Bundeswehr, Diehl re-entered the defence technology sector and began producing 20- and 40-millimetre ammunition at a specially constructed plant in Röthenbach an der Pegnitz.

In 1958, Diehl acquired Sundwig Brass Works (Sundwiger Messingwerk), enabling the company to offer rods, tubes and forged parts as well as wires and strips from a single source. The company was sold in 2020.

In 1975, Diehl acquired a stake in Konstanzer Computertechnik Müller (CTM) to further its activities in the fields of medium-sized data technology and text systems. In 1979, Diehl acquired Comet, one of the oldest manufacturers of pyrotechnic products in Germany. The company, which had developed rocket propulsion systems for cars, rail vehicles and aircraft together with Fritz von Opel, complemented Diehl's defence technology business. Comet was sold in 2005.

The Mega 1, the first radio-controlled wristwatch in the world, was produced in 1990 (larger radio-controlled clocks had already existed before then). The following year, Junghans also launched the world's first radio-controlled wristwatch with clock hands. In 2000, Diehl sold its watch division, including the Junghans brand, to EganaGoldpfeil Holdings.

=== Internationalisation and new developments ===
To complement its metal-related activities, Diehl acquired the French company Griset in 1997, a manufacturer of stepped strips made of copper and copper alloys for the electronics industry.

In 1998, Thomas Diehl, one of the three sons of Karl Diehl, took over as chairman of the Diehl Group.

In order to serve the Chinese market, a slitting and service centre was established in Shenzhen in 1999.

One year later, Diehl took over the US company The Miller Company, a producer of copper and copper alloy strips. In 2007, Diehl split its aerospace and defence divisions. The previously combined divisions became independent subsidiaries, operating under the names Diehl Defence and Diehl Aerosystems (later Diehl Aviation).

When Thomas Diehl passed away in April 2017, Wolfgang Weggen, who had long served as Chief Financial Officer and was a close confidant of Thomas Diehl, temporarily assumed the position of chairman. Shortly before the annual press conference in July 2017, the family appointed Markus Diehl, the youngest son of Thomas Diehl, to represent the interests of his siblings Alexander and Stephanie on the supervisory board.

== Company structure ==
Since 1998, the group has been managed as Diehl Stiftung & Co. KG, which was created by a resolution of the shareholders to convert Diehl GmbH. The Diehl Verwaltungs-Stiftung acts as general partner of Diehl Stiftung & Co. KG.

== Business divisions ==
The group consists of five corporate divisions: Defence, Aviation, Metal, Controls and Metering.

=== Diehl Aviation ===
Diehl Aviation develops and manufactures cabin interiors, including galleys and lavatories, as well as air distribution and lighting systems for aircraft. Its main client is Airbus, for which Diehl Aviation supplies equipment for both short- and long-haul models. Around 75 per cent of its business is generated from fitting out new aircraft, with the remaining share coming from cabin upgrades of aircraft already in service.

This corporate division also includes Diehl Aerospace, a joint venture with the French company Thales.

=== Diehl Controls ===
Diehl Controls, headquartered in Wangen im Allgäu, is a manufacturer of electronic components for the household appliance industry. The company also develops hardware and software systems for central building control units, as well as products for energy management systems. Diehl Controls manufactures over ten million electronic units each year, including control systems and user interfaces for dishwashers, ovens, washing machines, dryers, and refrigeration appliances.

=== Diehl Defence ===
Diehl Defence develops and manufactures ammunition, surface-to-air missiles and guided weapons for the army, navy and air force. One of its best-known products is the IRIS-T SLM air defence system, which was originally developed by Diehl in the late 1990s for the German Armed Forces (Bundeswehr) and later refined into a ground-based system. The system is used by Germany and Ukraine, among others, and is internationally regarded as one of the most powerful of its kind.

=== Diehl Metall ===
Diehl Metall, based in Röthenbach an der Pegnitz, manufactures semi-finished products and forged parts made of copper and copper alloys, high-precision stamped parts, and metal-plastic composite systems for electronic and electrotechnical applications.

=== Diehl Metering ===
Diehl Metering provides systems for the intelligent measurement of water, thermal energy, gas, and electricity. Diehl Metering covers the entire process chain, from measuring devices to data management. Around seven million measuring instruments and five million radio modules are produced annually in the company's facilities.
