= Diehl Metall =

- Founded: 1938
- Headquarters: Röthenbach an der Pegnitz near Nuremberg, Germany
- Key people: Dr.-Ing. Heinrich Schunk (Sprecher), Dipl.-Kfm. Rainer Wehn, Dipl.-Sozw. Manuela Kallinowsky, Dipl.-Wirtsch.-Ing. Dieter Landgraf
- Revenue: €940 million (Trend 2018)
- Number of employees: 3,680 (Trend 2018)
- Website: www.diehl.com/metall

Diehl Metall is a corporate division of the Diehl Stiftung & Co. KG, a worldwide operating industrial group with its head office in Röthenbach an der Pegnitz near Nuremberg, Germany. The production units of Diehl Metall are situated at 13 locations in Europe, Asia, South America and the US. With 3,420 employees the company generated a turnover of €917 million in 2017. Diehl Metall produces semi-finished products, forgings and rolled products, high-precision stamped parts with plating technologies as well as Schempp+Decker press-fit zones and metal-plastic compound systems. The company provides material development and production, sheet metal forming and forging technology as well as plating, press-fit, overmolding and assembling technology completely in-house.

== History ==
=== Foundation, 1902 ===
In 1902 Margarete, née Schmidt (August 25, 1880, in Nuremberg), and Heinrich Diehl (born August 3, 1878, in Kölschhausen, died in Nuremberg) established an art foundry in Nuremberg. In 1914 they began producing rods and drop-forged parts which were launched at the Geuderstrasse site in Nuremberg.

In the next few years a metal producing plant and a modern extrusion press for the production of rods and tubes were constructed. In 1930 Karl Diehl, only son of Margarete and Heinrich Diehl, joined the parents’ company. He took on the metal processing company shortly before Second Worldwar. In 1938 they began building a new plant for semi-finished products at Röthenbach an der Pegnitz.

=== 1938–1999 ===
During World War II, major parts of the plant facilities were destroyed by air raids and almost the entire company's equipment was dismantled. On the basis of remaining presses, furnaces and machine tools, Diehl started to reconstruct its facilities. The foundry was converted from light to heavy metal.

In 1951, the setup of a 3,500-ton press took place. Diehl Metall started the production of synchronizer rings in 1956.

The company acquired Sundwiger Messingwerk KG in Hemer and became a manufacturer of rolled products. During the next years Diehl Metall built a new tube plant including a 1,600-ton press and established the first continuous dual-string casting plant for brass, with an annual capacity of 47,000 tons.

In 1973, Diehl do Brasil Metalúrgica was formed by Diehl Metall in São Paulo, Brazil.

From 1974 until 1984 the drop forge was expanded, another tube press was installed, a dust filtration system for the foundry was constructed and increased by the "Demag Continuous Casting System". In 1977 the so-called "Schumag hall" was set up. In 1981 a new strip rolling mill at Sundwiger Messingwerk was erected.

In 1985 heat recovery systems were installed in the foundry. At the same time the laboratory building at Diehl Metall Messing was extended. In 1990 Diehl Metall took part in a pilot project by the "Berlin Department of Environment" and set up a new dust filtration system.

In 1988, in Shenzhen, north of Hong Kong/China, a slitting and service center was established. Diehl Metall Schmiedetechnik was relocated to new facilities.

In 1999 Röthenbach an der Pegnitz became the headquarters of the corporate division Diehl Metall. One year later Diehl Metall took over The Miller Company (US).

=== 2000–present ===
In 2002, Karl Diehl retired from the company and his first-born son Werner Diehl took over as chairman of the board.

In 2003, Diehl Synchro Tec Manufacturing (Wuxi) Co. Ltd. was established in China.

In 2006, Diehl Metall took over OTB Oberflächentechnik in Berlin and formed Diehl Power Electronics S.A.S. in France. One year later, the company took over Diehl Augé Découpage in France.

In 2009, Diehl Metal Applications GmbH (DMA) with locations in Germany, France and China was established, the subsidiaries of Diehl Metal Applications being Diehl Metal Applications GmbH (Location Berlin), Diehl Metal Applications GmbH (Location Teltow), Sundwiger Messingwerk (Hemer), Diehl Augé Decoupage (Besançon), Diehl Power Electronic (Siaugues), Diehl Metall (Shenzhen). One year later Diehl Metall took over Zehdenick Innovative Metall- und Kunststofftechnik GmbH (ZIMK), which is also a subsidiary of Diehl Metal Applications. The Diehl Metal Applications product development was established in 2011 and is involved in the development of the electrification of drive trains and the bonding of battery cells.

In 2012, Diehl took over the Schempp & Decker Präzisionsteile und Oberflächentechnik GmbH in Berlin. In the same year Diehl Metal India Pvt. Ltd. was established in India.

In 2013, both of the companies OTB Oberflächentechnik in Berlin and Schempp & Decker Präzisionsteile und Oberflächentechnik were formed in a merger into Diehl Metal Applications GmbH.

== Locations ==
Diehl Metall Messing (German for brass) in Röthenbach an der Pegnitz manufactures semi-finished brass like rods, tubes and profiles as well as cast billets and ingots from their own foundry. The total capacity is 150,000 tons of semi-finished products per year. Diehl Metall Schmiedetechnik (German for forging technology) is also located in Röthenbach an der Pegnitz and provides forgings and synchronizer rings for automotive transmission. The plant has one of Europe's largest forging capacity. Diehl do Brasil Metalúrgica in São Paulo/Brazil produces brass synchronizer rings for the North and South American market. Diehl Metal India, based in Pune / India, one of the main centers of the automotive industry, manufactures and distributes synchronizer rings in the Indian market. Diehl Synchro Tec Manufacturing in Wuxi / China produces synchronizer rings for the Asian market.

Franconia Industries in Meriden, Connecticut, US, is the sales organization of the business portfolios extruded and drawn manufactures, forgings and rolled products for the markets in the U.S. and Canada.

SMH Süddeutsche Metallhandelsgesellschaft in Röthenbach an der Pegnitz offers the possibility to hedge alloy metals, especially copper, tin, zinc, and nickel in the form of raw metal or recycled material at Diehl Metall to mitigate risks as price trends and volatility of metal prices.

Diehl Metal Applications in Berlin features metallic coating of strips and stamped parts, so-called surface finishing. Focus in the plastics sector at Diehl Metal Applications in Teltow is the manufacture of lamp sockets for automotive lamps. In addition, the company is one of the market leaders in the fields of precision parts and surface coating.

Diehl Augé Decoupage at the site Besançon / France has its own toolmaking, the own tool design allows precision stamping technology for the most demanding precision stamped parts in small-scale series and mass production.

At Diehl Power Electronic in Siaugues Sainte-Marie/ France offers fully metallic plating as well as stripe plating of strips made of different metals and stamped parts.

The Sundwiger Messingwerk (German for brass plant) in Hemer develops and produces strip and wire based on the alloy groups tin bronze, nickel silver, brass and copper specialty alloys such as copper-iron and copper-nickel-silicon.

The Miller Company in Meriden, Connecticut, US, is one of the market leaders in the field of copper strip of various alloys and is one of the most specialized manufacturers of phosphor bronze in the US.

ZIMK (Zehdenick Innovative Metall-und Kunststofftechnik (German for Zehdenick innovative metal and plastic technology)) in Zehdenick is a company for tools, stamping and plastics technology and a supplier for the automotive, electronics and communication industries.

== Products ==
- Copper alloys
- Rods, tubes, profiles, ingots (made of brass and special brass)
- Drop-forged parts (made of light alloys and brass)
- Synchronizer rings (made of brass and steel) with or without friction lining
- Strips for electrical connectors, lead frames, contacts
- Wire for electronic and electrical components and the eyewear industry
- Precision stamped parts
- Schempp+Decker press-fit zones
- Metallic plating for wear resistance, solderability, corrosion resistance or conductivity
- Metal-plastic compound systems for electronic and electrotechnical applications, such as ABS, ESP, transmission control or central electric systems

== Brands ==
Diehl Metall Messing

- CUPHIN: Lead-free valve material for drinking water applications
- AQCUARIN: Dezincification resistant brass for drinking water applications with reduced lead release
- ECOMERICA: low-leaded brass alloy for drinking water applications according to US-legislation
- TEC.PURE: Lead-free and wear resistant brass materials for the automotive industry
- ECOBRASS: Lead-free high-tensile brass for the automotive industry
- BMOTION: High-tensile brasses for the automotive industry

Diehl Metall Schmiedetechnik

- Formed@Diehl: Precision stamped parts out of brass, steel, copper and aluminium
- Diehl BlackLine: Friction layers out of carbon with increased friction performance and wear resistance
- Diehl GoldLine: Sintered powder friction layer based on bronze

Diehl Metal Applications

- Diehl on Top: Surface finishing of metals
- rolled@Diehl: Copper alloys as material for strips
- drawn@Diehl: Copper alloys as a material for wire
- Schempp+Decker press-fit zones: Solderless connection technology
- Diehl Ökobronze BB05xi: Completely recyclable phosphor bronze
- Diehl ECO-SILVER 18: Nickel silver alloy for electromagnetic shielding
- SKEDD: Direktstecktechnologie für Leiterplattenanschlüsse
