= Roland (missile) =

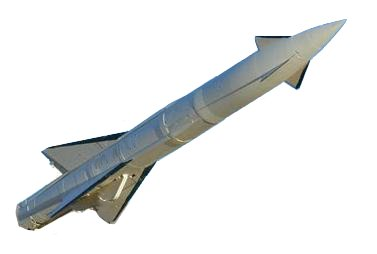
- Type: Surface-to-air missile
- Place of origin: France and West Germany

Service history
- In service: 1977–present
- Wars: Iran–Iraq War; Falklands War; Gulf War; Iraq War

Production history
- Designed: 1963
- Manufacturer: Euromissile

Specifications
- Mass: 67 kg
- Length: 2.40 m
- Diameter: 16 cm
- Wingspan: 50 cm
- Warhead: 6.5 kg (14 lb) pre-fragmented high-explosive
- Engine: Dual-thrust solid-fueled rocket: Booster: "Roubaix" rocket, 15.3 kN for 1.7 s; Sustainer: "Lampyre" rocket, 1.96 kN for 13.2 s
- Operational range: 8,000 m
- Flight altitude: 5,500 m
- Maximum speed: Mach 1.6
- Guidance system: Early warning by search radar. Target and missile tracking by optical system (Roland 1) or tracking radar (Roland 2)

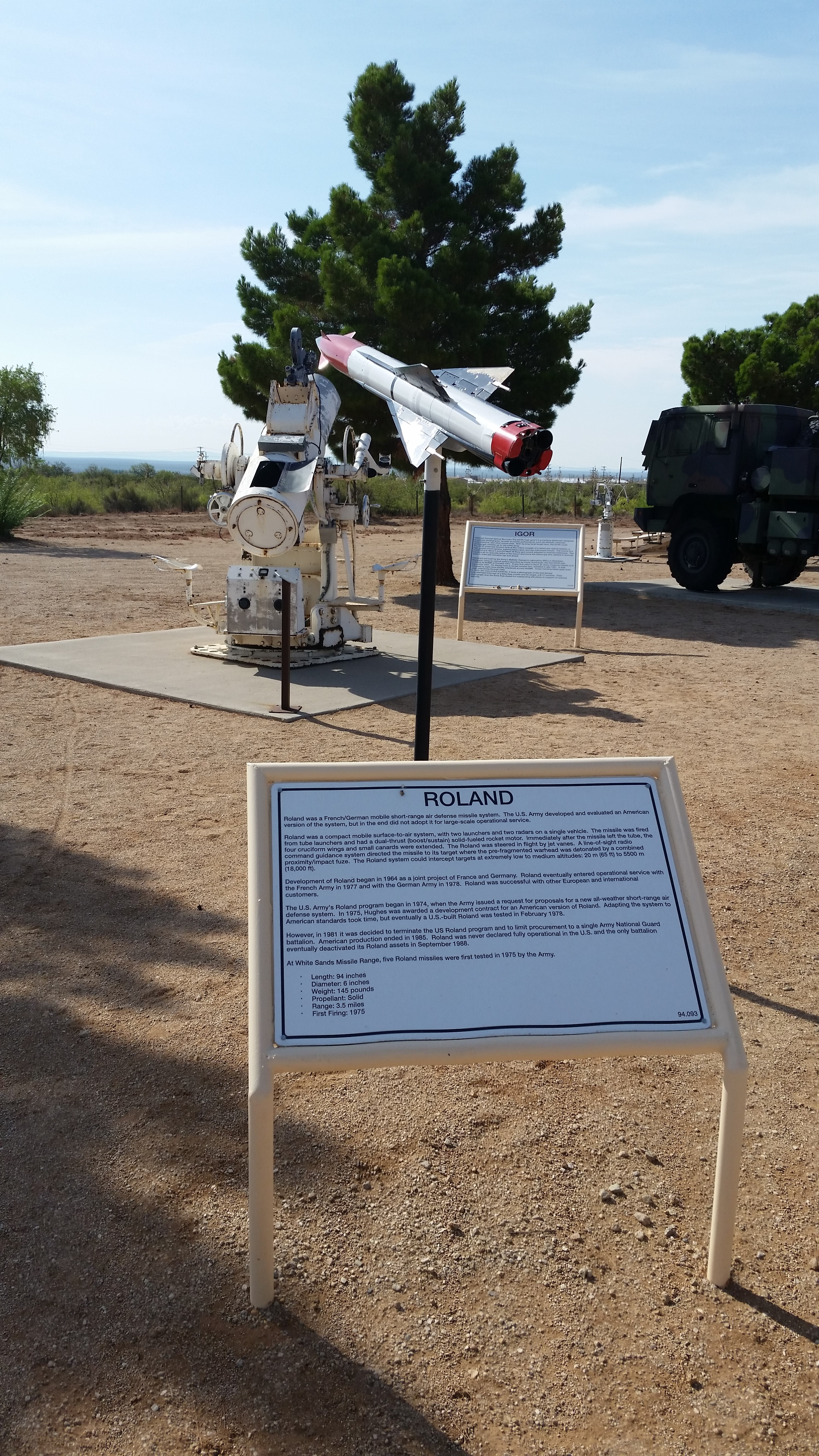
White Sands Missile Range Museum Roland display

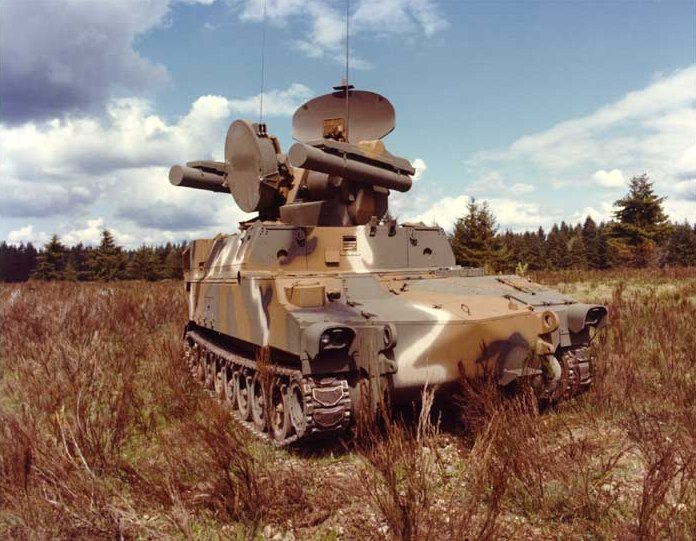
Abortive U.S. Army version of Roland, mounted on its purpose-designed XM975 vehicle (single prototype built, the production vehicle if the program had proceeded would have been designated as the M975).

The Roland is a Franco-German mobile short-range surface-to-air missile (SAM) system. The Roland was also purchased by the U.S. Army as one of very few foreign SAM systems.

== Development ==
Roland was designed to a joint French and German requirement for a low-level mobile missile system to protect mobile field formations and fixed, high-value targets such as airfields. Development began in 1963 as a study by Nord Aviation of France and Bölkow of Germany with the system then called SABA in France and P-250 in Germany. The two companies formed a joint development project in 1964 and later (as Aérospatiale of France and MBB of Germany) founded the Euromissile company for this and other missile programs. Aerospatiale took primary responsibility for the Roland 1 day/clear-weather system while MBB took primary responsibility for the Roland 2 all-weather system. Aerospatiale was also responsible for the rear and propulsion system of the missile while MBB developed the front end of the missile with warhead and guidance systems. The first guided launch of a Roland prototype took place in June 1968, destroying a Nord Aviation CT20 target drone and fielding of production systems was expected from January 1970. The test and evaluation phase took much longer than originally anticipated with the clear-weather Roland I finally entering operational service with the French Army in April 1977, while the all-weather Roland II was first fielded by the German Army in 1978 followed by the French Army in 1981. The long delays and ever-increasing costs combined with inflation meant Roland was never procured in the numbers originally anticipated.

== Variants ==
The Roland SAM system was designed to engage enemy air targets flying at speeds of up to Mach 1.3 at altitudes between 20 meters and 5,500 meters with a minimum effective range of 500 meters and a maximum of 6,300 meters. The system can operate in optical or radar mode and can switch between these modes during an engagement. A pulse-doppler search radar with a range of 15–18 km detects the target which can then be tracked either by the tracking radar or an optical tracker. The optical channel would normally be employed only in daylight against very low-level targets or in a heavy jamming environment.

The Roland missile is a two-stage solid propellant unit 2.4 meters long with a weight of 66.5 kg including the 6.5 kg multiple hollow-charge fragmentation warhead which contains 3.5 kg of explosive detonated by impact or proximity fuses. The 65 projectile charges have a lethal radius of 6 meters. Cruising speed is Mach 1.6. The missile is delivered in a sealed container which is also the launch tube. Each launcher carries two launch tubes with 8 more inside the vehicle or shelter with automatic reloading in 10 seconds.

For defense of fixed sites such as airfields the shelter Roland can be integrated in the CORAD (Co-ordinated Roland Air Defense) system which can include a surveillance radar, a Roland Co-ordination Center, 8 Roland fire units and up to 8 guns.

=== Fire units ===
- Roland 1 – The initial fair-weather, daylight-only, version used by the French and Spanish armies on the AMX-30R chassis with entry into service in 1976. Roland 1 can also fire the Roland 2 and Roland 3 missiles.
- Roland 2 – This is the all-weather version mounted on the AMX-30R chassis (France and others), the Marder chassis (Germany, FlaRakPz 1, Heer, and others) and also as a shelter mount in either a static location or mounted on a 6×6 or 8×8 all-terrain truck (Germany, Roland FRR, Luftwaffe and Bundesmarine, and others). Euromissile, MaK, IBH and Blohm and Voss of Germany in 1983 proposed the Leopard 1 tank chassis as a carrier for the Roland system to appeal to those countries who already used the Leopard I tank. Roland 2 can also fire the Roland 3 missile.
- American Roland – Selected in 1975 as the forward air defense system for U.S. Army divisions, the first missiles were delivered in 1977 with the first firing from the XM975 launcher vehicle (a modified M109 howitzer chassis) taking place in September 1978. (Prior to late 1977 it was planned to use a version of the M520 Goer as the launcher vehicle.) American Roland was essentially Roland 2 with a longer-ranged American-made search radar. The palletized fire unit could be installed and rapidly removed from the XM975 chassis, installed on a truck or used as a static emplacement. Problems with technology transfer and rising costs (ostensibly at least, institutional resistance within the U.S. Army/DOD and Congress to using a 'foreign' weapons system may have actually played more of a role) killed the program and only 27 fire units and 600 missiles were built for one battalion in the Army National Guard, mounted on M812 flatbed trucks. With the failure of the M247 Sergeant York the U.S. Army leased 5 German Roland systems for evaluation as a possible replacement.
- Paladin – Paladin was the Hughes/Euromissile submission for the US Army's Line of Sight, Forward-Heavy requirement. It proposed using the XM957 for trials, with production vehicles to use the Bradley chassis.
- Roland 3 – As part of the development process for the Roland 3 missile, Euromissile developed an upgraded launcher with 4 ready to fire missiles.
- Glaive – Glaive was a Franco-German programme under which Euromissile would develop a revised Roland fire unit for use with the RM5 missile. This would add an integrated thermal sighting system with laser rangefinder allowing for night/all-weather operation without using the radar. Contracts were issued in 1989 with the system intended to enter service in 1996. However, development of RM5 was cancelled in 1991.
- Roland M3S (upgrade) – This system was an upgrade of existing French Roland 1/2 systems to maintain them in service through 2010. It included fitting the BBKS operator consoles and replacing the existing optical sight with the Glaive thermal imaging unit. France had a requirement to update 54 AMX30-based fire units and 20 shelter units with this new equipment. The upgraded fire unit could use either the existing Roland missile or the new Roland 3 missile.
- Roland CAROL – "CAbine ROLand". Conversion of existing French Roland 2 systems into a shelter-mounted version of the M3S standard. France procured 20 trailer-borne systems. France intended the shelterised variants for use with air-transported rapid-deployment forces. The upgraded fire unit could use either the existing Roland missile or the new Roland 3 missile.
- Roland LVB – "Luftverlastbarkeit", air-transportable. The Luftwaffe acquired 10 truck-mounted versions, similar to Roland CAROL, with integration into the Heeres Flugabwehr Aufklärungs-und Führungssystem (HFLaAFüSys) air-defence command and control system. As with France, Germany intended the shelterised variants for use with air-transported rapid-deployment forces. The upgraded fire unit could user either the existing Roland missile or the new Roland 3 missile.
- Roland NDV – "Nutzungsdauer verlängert", Extended Service Life. This was a German parallel to the French M3S, being developed by LFK GmbH for the German government. The control system was to be digitized and integrated into the HFLaAFüSys air-defence command and control system, with Roland 3 missile integration. Germany had a requirement to upgrade 84 Army (FlaRakPz 1A2) and 40 Luftwaffe (FlaRakRad) fire units. Trials had been completed in 2003 when Germany decided to withdraw Roland from use.
- Roland M3S (new build) – The prototype for this next-generation Roland system was completed in 1992 and was offered to meet the air defense requirements of Turkey and Thailand. The prototype was a shelter installed on the chassis of the American M270 Multiple Launch Rocket System and featured a then Dassault Electronique Rodeo 4 or a Thomson-CSF search radar. Roland M3S can be operated by one man although 2 are necessary for sustained operation and the operator can select radar, TV or optronic (FLIR) tracking. Roland M3S has 4 instead of 2 missile containers in the ready-to-fire position but only the 2 lower positions can be automatically reloaded. In addition to the original Roland missile Roland M3S could use the Roland 3 missile, or the VT1 missile of the Crotale missile system. Additionally the upper launch containers could be replaced by 2 pairs of launchers for the Mistral missile or the standard Roland missile container could be adapted to carry four FIM-92 Stinger missiles to increase the system's ability to rapidly engage multiple targets in a saturation attack.
- Roland MX/Jason – From 1969 Euromissile studied Roland as a possible naval weapon for shipboard installation. Originally known as Roland MX and later as Jason, the standard twin launcher (without search radar) with two below-decks 8-round reloading drums could be installed on a standard sized module that was featured in several Blohm & Voss MEKO frigate proposals of the 1970s. No prototype or production systems were built with attention turning early on to an abortive vertically launched missile.

=== Missile variants ===
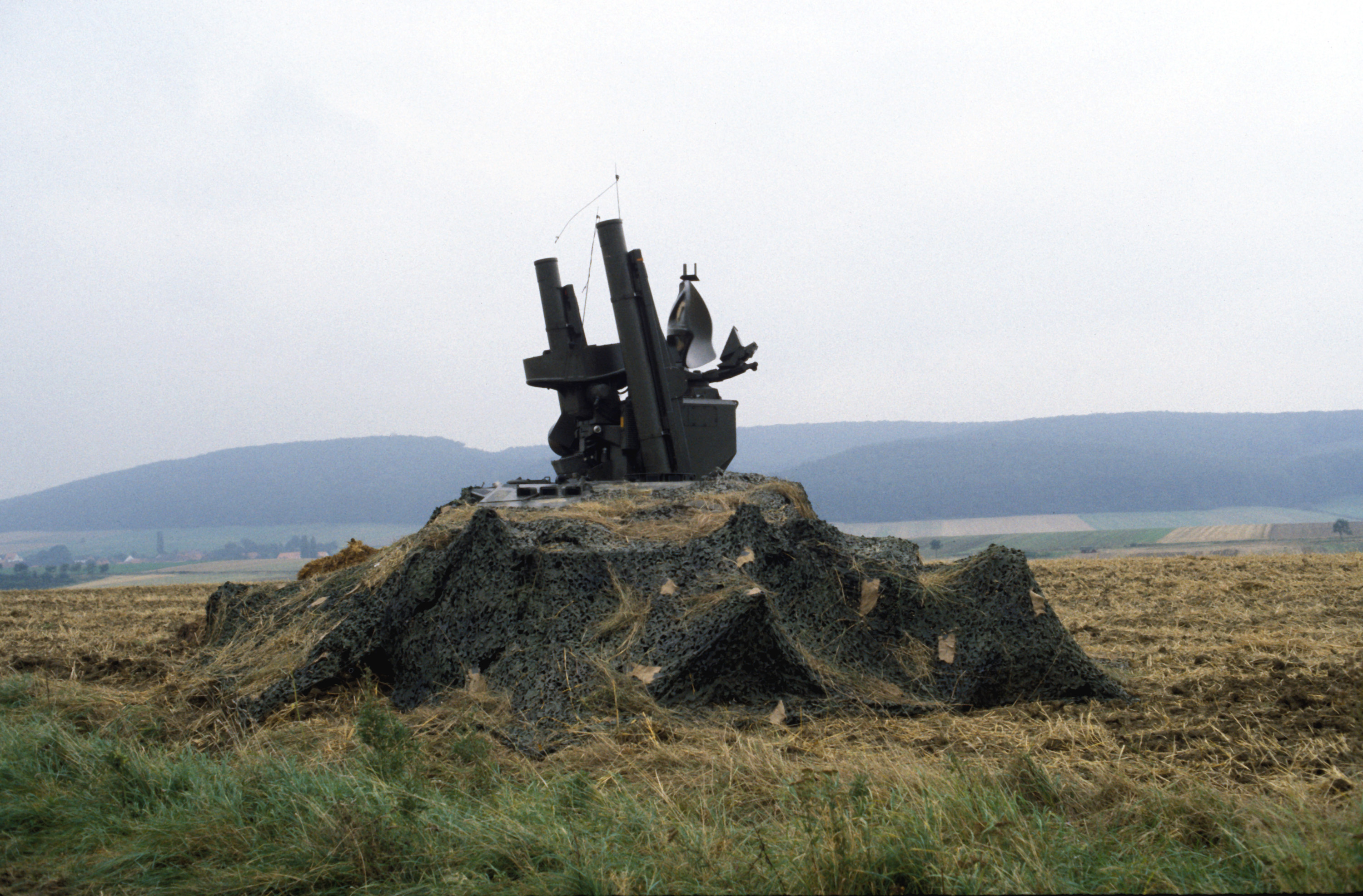
A Roland 2 missile system on the Marder 1 tracked chassis seen under camouflage netting during exercise in 1985.

Roland 1/2
The initial missile for the Roland system, entering production in 1977. Roland has a speed of 550 m/s and a range of 6.2 km. Roland 1 and 2 missiles have identical statistics but differ in tracking modes, Roland 1 being optically tracked, while Roland 2 missiles incorporate a continuous wave beacon to allow automatic radar tracking.
Roland 3
An upgraded missile which entered production in 1988 with speed increased from 550 m/s to 620 m/s and range increased from 6.3 to 8.5 km with maximum effective altitude increased to 6,000 m. Warhead size is also increased to 9.1 kg with 84 hollow-charges. Response time for the first target is quoted as 6–8 seconds with 2–6 seconds for subsequent targets. The Roland 3 missile can be used by all Roland systems.
Roland RM5 (Roland Mach 5)
This was a joint project between the then Matra and Aerospatiale of France and MBB of Germany begun in 1987 for a missile with increased speed and range. RM5 was designed to achieve speeds of 1,600 m/s (Mach 5.0) with the range increased to 10 km. The RM5 warhead had an 11 kg warhead with dual detonation modes, able to produce either large, high energy fragments for use against armoured targets, or larger numbers of smaller fragments for use against small targets. The companies had committed to only the preliminary design phase and when Germany and France opted not to fund full scale development in 1991 development of RM-5 ceased.
VT1
In September 1991 Euromissile and the then Thomson-CSF agreed to integrate the VT1 missile of the Crotale NG system into the Roland 3 system with retrofitting of French and German Roland fire units from 1996. Thales subsequently revoked the Euromissile license, but was ordered to pay Euromissile $109m in a subsequent court case.
HFK/KV
HFK/KV was a BGT proposed alternative to VT1. It was a hypersonic missile with a speed of over Mach 5, intended to reach maximum range of 12 km in only 60% of the time taken by VT1. Guidance was to be inertial with terminal infra-red homing.

Current systems are capable of launching Roland 2, Roland 3 or VT1 missiles. Roland's latest upgraded versions have limited ability to counter incoming low radar cross-section munitions (large-caliber heavyweight rockets).

== Carriers ==
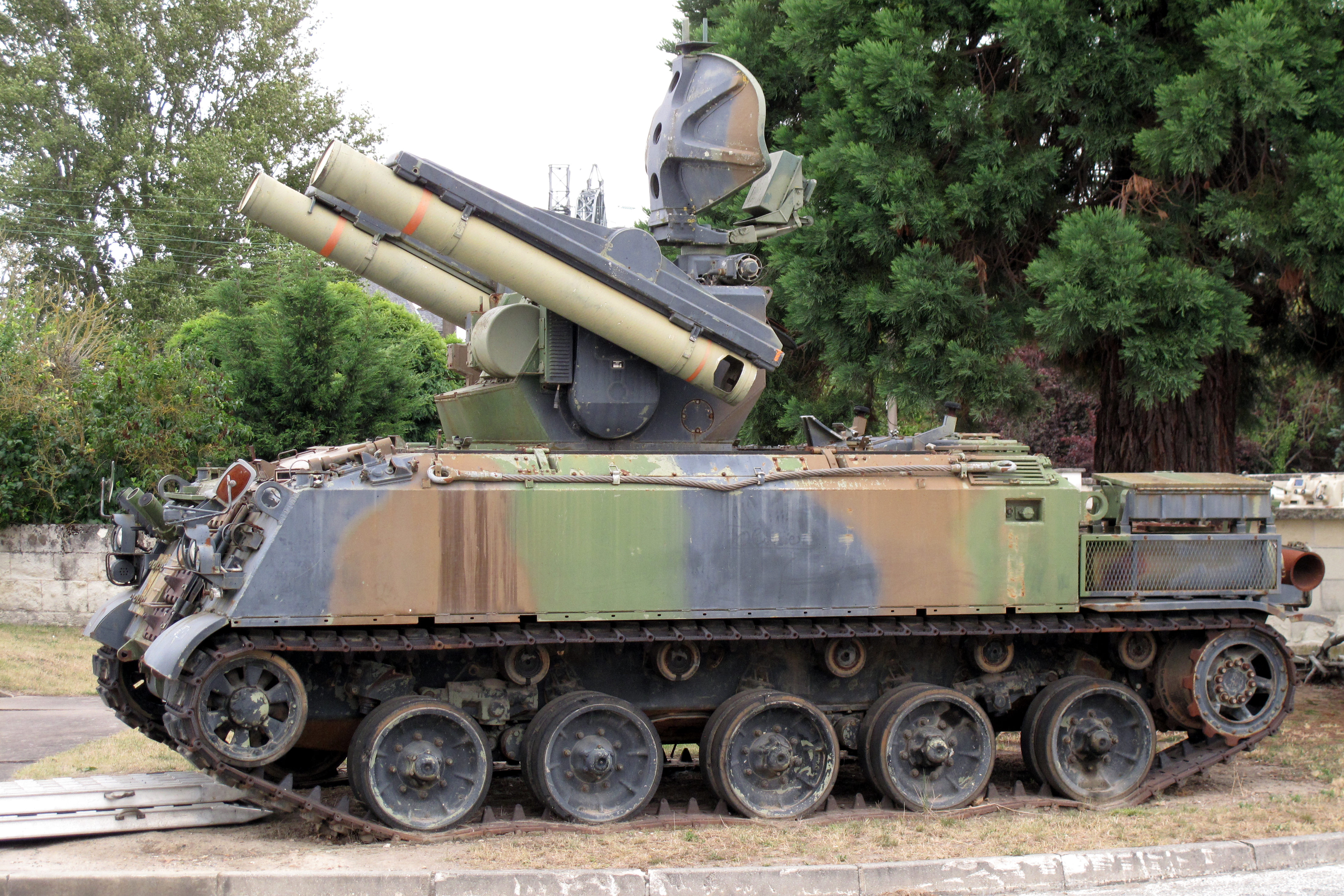
AMX-30R formerly of the 401^{e} Régiment d'Artillerie (401^{e} RA) on external display at the Musée des Blindés, Saumur.

The Roland system has been installed on a variety of platforms, amongst them:

Tracked

- AMX 30
- Marder

Wheeled

- ACMAT 6×6
- MAN 6×6, 8×8

Roland 2 was proposed in the early 1980s for installation on the Leopard 1 tank chassis, probably to meet an expected Dutch army requirement but was never built. In configuration it would have been very similar to the AMX-30R.

American Roland on the M109 chassis was built in prototype form but production systems were rather hastily installed on 6×6 flatbed trucks. In the late 1980s there was an attempt to revive the American Roland program with the Paladin submission to the U.S. Army's LOS-F-H (Line Of Sight - Forward - Heavy) battlefield air defense program. This new version of the American Roland system would have used the existing XM975 vehicle for testing & evaluation purposes, with production systems being fitted on a new modified M2 Bradley chassis.

An airliftable shelter named Roland CAROL has also been developed, which is a 7.8t container that can be deployed on the ground to protect fixed assets like airfields or depots or fitted on an ACMAT truck.

== Users ==
- Initial French requirements were for 144 Roland 1 and 70 Roland 2 systems with 10,800 missiles for the French Army, all installed on the AMX-30 tank chassis known as the AMX-30R. 181 systems (83 Roland 1 and 98 Roland 2) were eventually procured. The French Army has subsequently converted 20 of its Roland 2 all-weather systems to the Carole air-mobile shelter mounted system. These are used by the 54th Roland Regiment of the French Reaction Force for rapid deployment on short notice anywhere in the world. Three of the four Artillery Regiments which operated Roland have been disbanded and the 4th (54 Regiment) has been converted to the Mistral (missile). Thus it is likely Roland has been withdrawn from French service.
- Germany was to buy 12,200 missiles and 340 Roland 2 fire units to fully replace the towed Bofors 40 mm guns systems and Contraves Super Fledermaus fire control systems. Eventually 140 fire units installed on the Marder (IFV) chassis were procured for service with the German Army Corps-level air defense and equipped 3 regiments of 36 fire units in 6 batteries of 6 with one regiment assigned to each army corps (I., II., III.) and one battalion of 18 fire units (3 x 6) for the Corps LANDJUT. The Luftwaffe had a requirement for 200 Roland 2 systems for the close-in defense of airfields and as mobile gap-fillers for the MIM-23 HAWK SAM systems. 95 shelter mounted Roland systems (FRR) on MAN 8×8 trucks were eventually procured from the mid-1980s with 27 of those used by US Forces to defend American air bases in Germany. In 1998–99 10 Roland LVB systems were installed on MAN 6×6 trucks to be air-transportable in the Transall C-160 for the German rapid reaction forces. The German Navy also procured 20 FRR truck-mounted shelter systems for defense of naval air bases. Air Force and Navy Roland batteries consisted of 8 FRR fire units and an additional shelter-mounted Fire Direction Centre (FGR) with a TRML-2D radar. In February 2003 the Bundeswehr cancelled a planned upgrade of Roland and announced it would phase-out all of its Roland systems. This was completed by the end of 2005. The Luftwaffe and Navy have also withdrawn Roland and it is no longer employed by Germany. The Army had planned to replace Roland with the new and much more capable development LFK NG, but in 2012 the Army had to hand over the task of Short Range Air Defense to the German Air Force, ending all plans. A battery of shelter-mounted ROLAND FRR systems and a FGR Fire Direction Centre have been passed on to Slovenia.

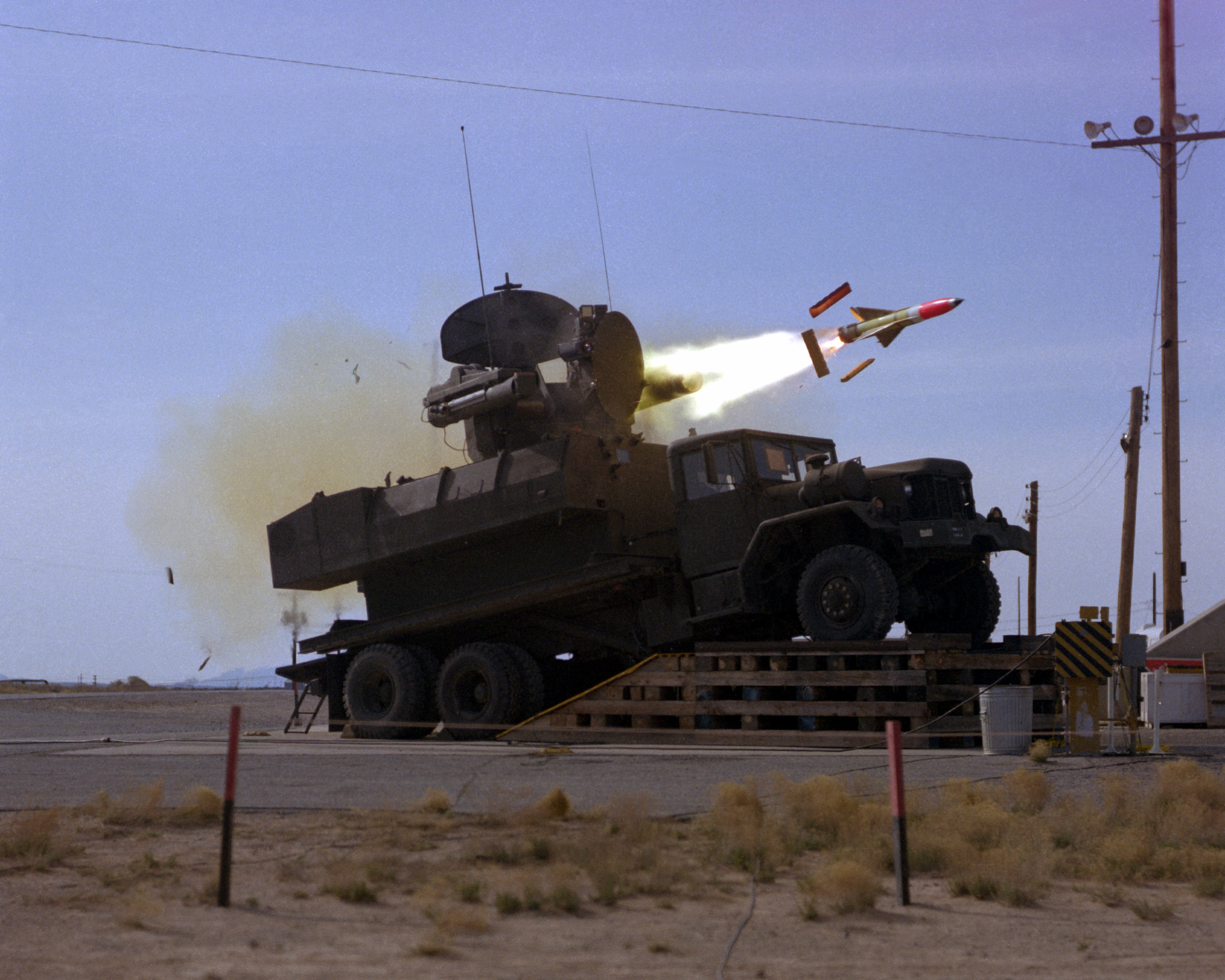
The Roland system served in the US in a limited capacity on an improvised wheeled truck chassis; never type classified and withdrawn unceremoniously in 1988.

- On January 9, 1975, the United States Army selected Roland 2 as the winner of its SHORADS (Short-Range Air Defense System) competition to replace the MIM-72 Chaparral and M163 VADS divisional air defense systems with a requirement for more than 500 fire units to be designated the MIM-115. Hughes Aircraft and Boeing Aerospace were contracted to develop American Roland which would have been installed in a removable module on the M109 howitzer chassis. The American system used the European fire control system with an American search radar of greater range and enhanced ECCM capability. Initial production of fire units to equip 4 battalions and 1,000 missiles (against an anticipated requirement for 14,000) was approved in October 1978 but subsequently reduced to just 1 battalion. Difficulties in technology transfer, integration and commonality difficulties and rising costs meant only a single Army National Guard battalion (part of the 200th Air Defense Artillery Regiment) was ever equipped with the type, with the 27 launchers and 600 missiles installed on 6×6 flatbed trucks instead of tracked carriers. The XMIM-115 was never type-classified and served for less than a decade, being retired in 1988.
- Argentina purchased 4 Roland shelter-mounted systems for static defense of fixed installations and one of these was deployed to defend Stanley airfield during the Falklands War with Britain in 1982. This system fired 8 out of the 10 missiles it was deployed with and is credited with shooting down one Royal Navy Sea Harrier and two 1,000 lb (450 kg) general-purpose bombs (although the British used air burst 1,000 lb (450 kg) bomb in the conflict). This system was captured intact by the British and taken back to Britain.
- Brazil purchased 4 Roland 2 systems on the German Marder chassis along with 50 missiles, all of which were retired from service in 2001.

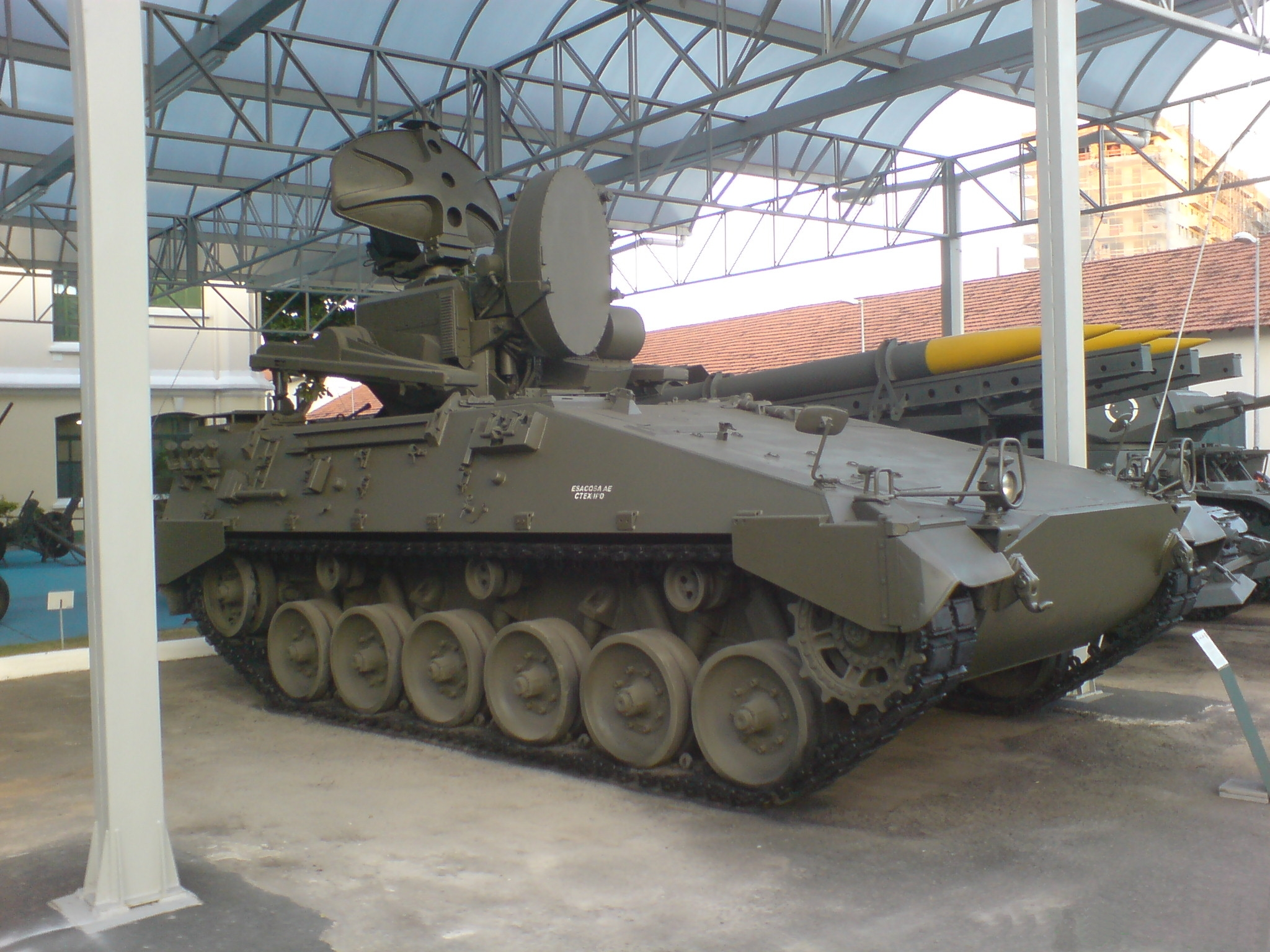
The Marder-Roland units bought by the Brazilian Army in the late '70s were retired in 2001 and are now on display at Museu Militar Conde de Linhares in Rio de Janeiro, Brazil.

- Venezuela purchased 6 Roland 2 shelter mounted systems although some sources at the time indicated 8 systems.
- Nigeria acquired 16 Roland 2 systems on the AMX-30R chassis. An option for a further 16 was not taken up.
- Spain acquired 9 Roland 1 and 9 Roland 2 systems on the AMX-30R chassis and 414 missiles for defense of its armored field formations equipping the 71st Air Defense Regiment. Each battery has 2 Roland 1 and 2 Roland 2 systems with one system of each type held for tests and training.
- Iraq is believed to have received 100 shelter-mounted Roland 2 on MAN 8×8 trucks and 13 self-propelled systems on the AMX-30R chassis during the 1980–88 Iran–Iraq War and they first went into action in 1982 claiming a F-4E Phantom and F-5E Tiger that year. Roland is believed to have shot down 2 Panavia Tornado aircraft and an A-6E TRAM Intruder during Operation Desert Storm and an A-10 Thunderbolt during the Iraq War. As a result of Operation Desert Storm in 1991 and Operation Iraqi Freedom in 2003 these systems may no longer be in service.
- In 1986 Qatar ordered 3 self-propelled Roland 2 systems on the AMX-30R chassis and 6 shelter-mounted systems with deliveries completed in 1989.

== Combat use ==
On 1 June 1982, during the Falklands War, Sea Harrier XZ456 was destroyed south of Stanley, by a Roland launched by members of the Argentine Army's GADA 601 (601st AA Artillery Group). The launcher, one of four examples delivered to Argentina, was later captured in fairly intact condition by the British around Port Stanley after the surrender. It was taken back to Britain as a valuable prize and studied in detail.

At around 11:00 pm on 17 January 1991, an A-6E TRAM Intruder from VA-35, AA-510 (BuNo 161668), crewed by Lt. Bob Wetzel and Lt. Jeff Zaun was attacked by two Rolands while attacking the H-3 Airfield in Western Iraq. The Roland did not set off the American-built RWRs, meaning that it was hard to detect. After evading the first Roland, another one (which the crew didn't see), impacted the aircraft. The crew successfully ejected but were soon captured. On 19 January 1991, during the Gulf War a RAF Panavia Tornado GR.1 ZA396/GE, on a SEAD mission against the Iraqi air base at Tallil, was destroyed by a Roland. Both crew members ejected successfully, were taken prisoner and survived the war. The destruction of at least one USAF A-10 Thunderbolt, which occurred at around the same time, was later attributed to a Roland, by the Pentagon.

== Rolandgate ==
In October 2003, controversy erupted between Poland and France when Polish forces from the Multinational force in Iraq found four French Roland surface-to-air missiles. Polish and international press reported that Polish officers claimed these missiles had been manufactured in 2003. France pointed out that it had never sold weapons to Iraq after July 1990 in violation of the embargo. Polish authorities would later remark that the four missiles were manufactured in 1984, and that the 2003 date was the last time when Iraqi personnel had serviced them. Investigations by the Polish authorities came to the conclusion that the persons responsible for the scandal were low level commanders. Wojskowe Służby Informacyjne, the Polish Army's intelligence unit, had not verified their claims before they were leaked to the press. Poland apologized to France for the scandal, but these allegations against France worsened the already somewhat strained relationships between the two countries. The entire incident was sarcastically called "Rolandgate" by the Polish media, using the unofficial naming conventions of US political scandals after Watergate.

== Operators ==
=== Current operators ===
- Nigeria
- Qatar

=== Former operators ===
- Argentina
- Brazil

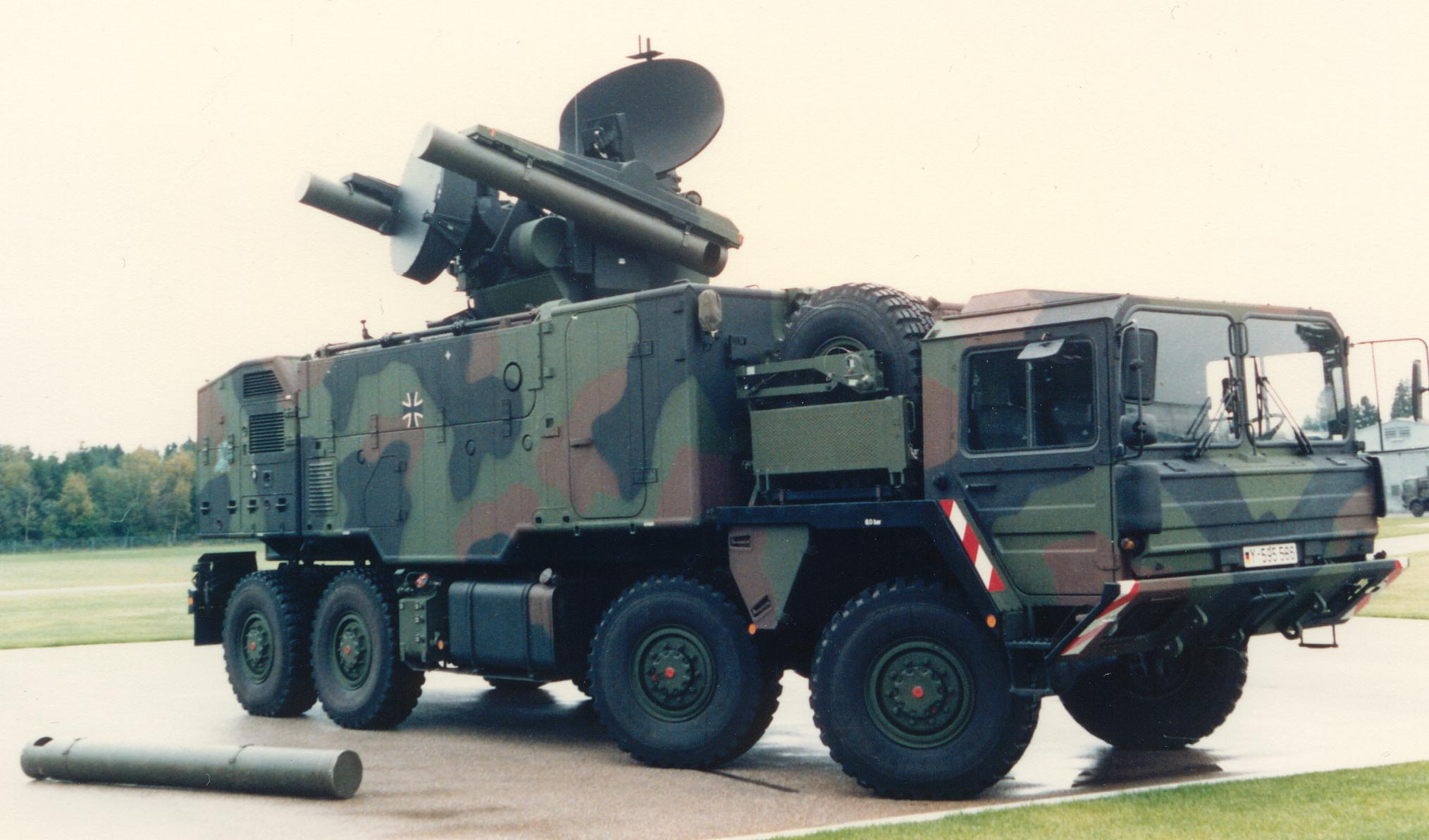
FlaRakRad Roland: 15 t MAN truck-based system

- France
- Germany
- Iraq - 127 Roland launchers: 13 on AMX-30 chassis and 100 on MAN trucks
- Slovenia (sent for destruction in Croatia in November 2016)
- Spain - From 2015 no longer in use
- United States – formerly used by the U.S. Army National Guard
- Venezuela

== Gallery ==
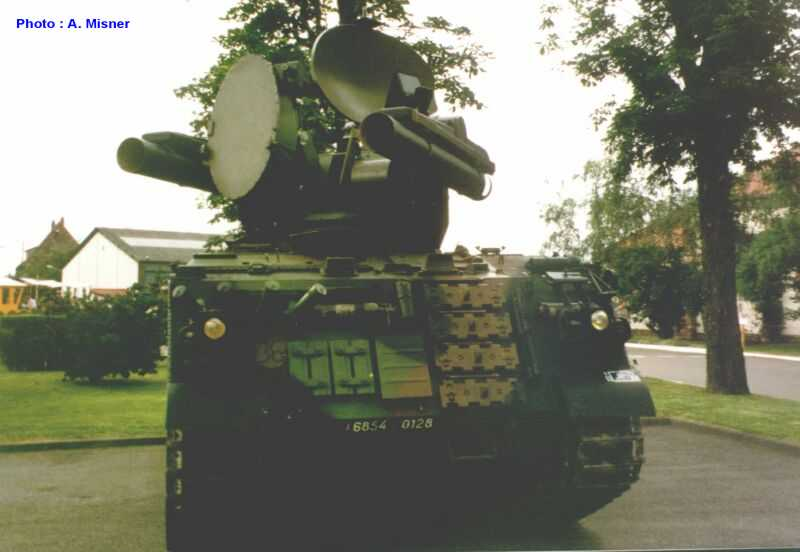
AMX-30R of French Army.

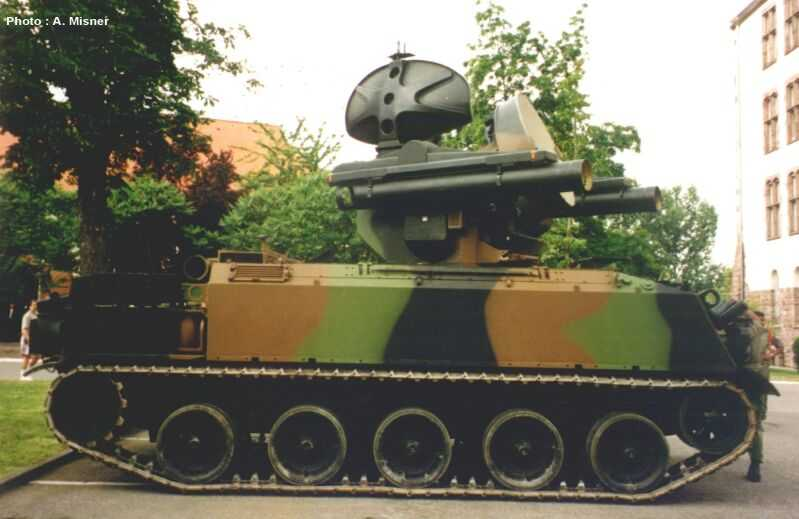

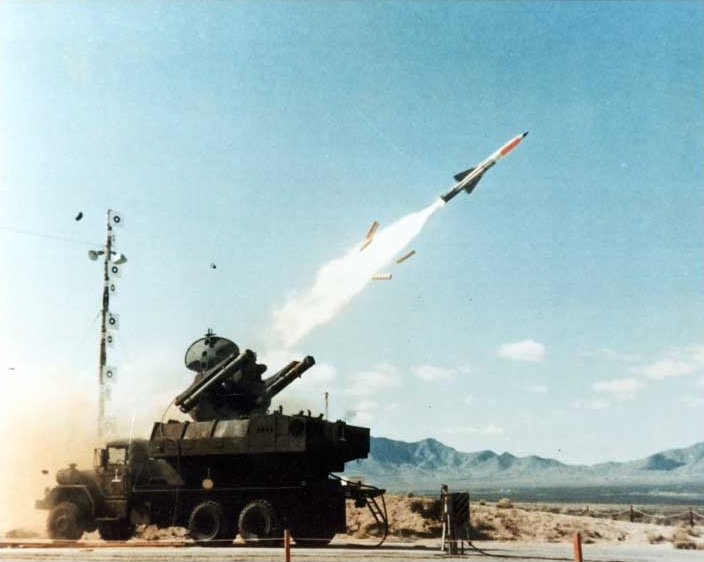
Truck M809 of 7/200th Air Defense Artillery Regiment.

== See also ==
- LFK NG, the new short-range surface-to-air missile of the German Army

== Sources ==
- Jane's Armour and Artillery 1986–87, pp. 556–558
- Jane's Land Based Air Defense 1993–94, 1999–2000 & 2002–03 editions
- Bill Gunston, The Illustrated Encyclopedia of the World's Rockets and Missiles, Salamander Books 1979, pp. 156–158
