= LFK NG =

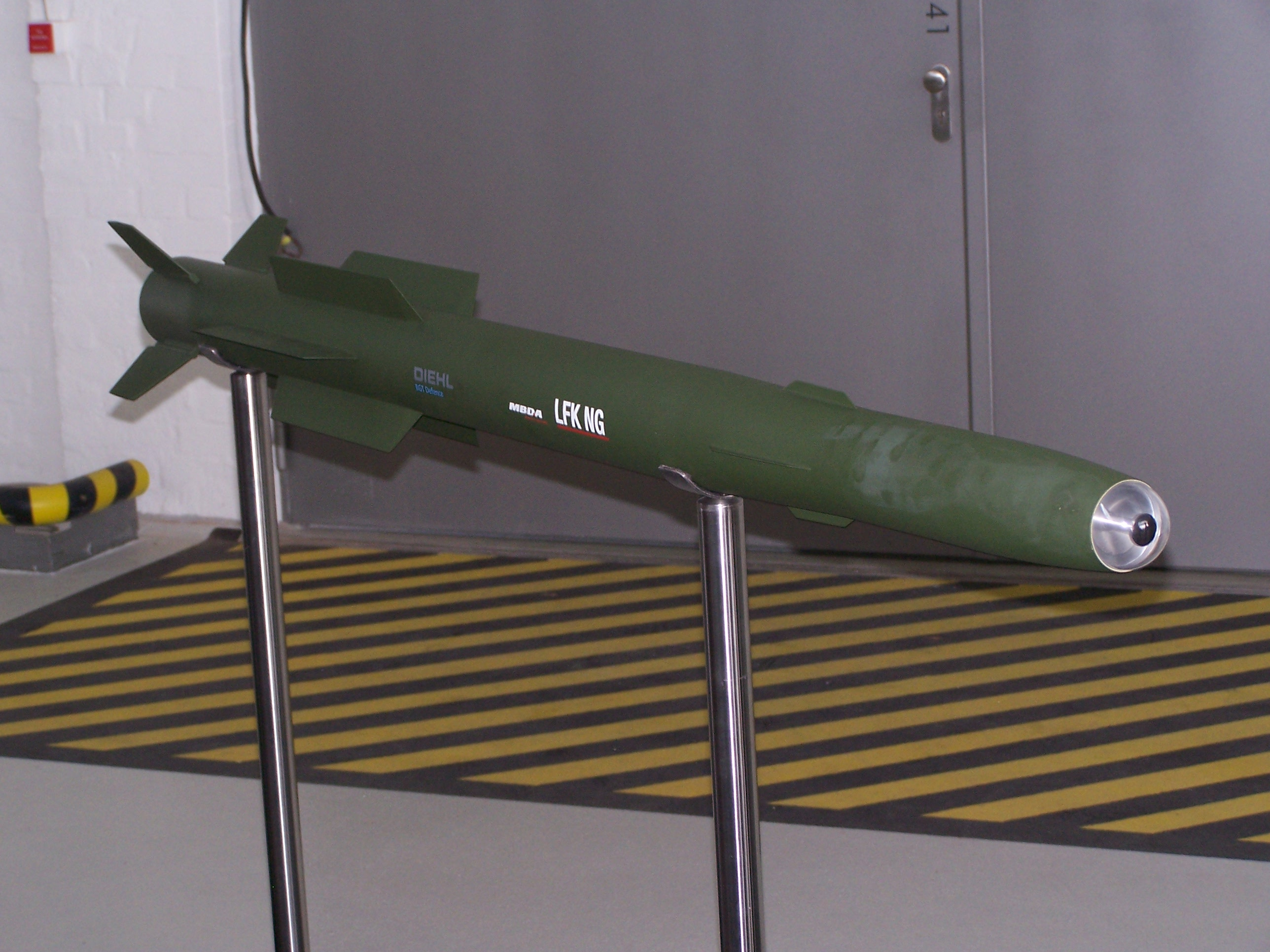
- An LFK NG missile
- Type: Surface-to-air missile
- Place of origin: Germany

Production history
- Manufacturer: MBDA Germany, Diehl Defence

Specifications
- Mass: 28 kg (62 lb)
- Length: 1.8 m (5 ft 11 in)
- Caliber: 90 mm (3.5 in)
- Muzzle velocity: Up to Mach 2.2 (2,695 km/h)
- Effective firing range: 8 km (5.0 mi)
- Maximum firing range: 10 km (6.2 mi)
- Payload capacity: Up to 2.5 kg (5.5 lb) warhead
- Guidance system: Infrared homing

LFK NG from Lenkflugkörper Neue Generation ("New Generation Guided Missile") was a cancelled short-range surface-to-air missile system under development for the German Army by MBDA Germany and Diehl Defence as a replacement for its Roland air defence systems and as a part of the army's new SysFla air defence program to supplement the new Ozelot air defence systems. It was a variant of the IRIS-T missile.

== Characteristics ==
Characteristics included a highly sensitive infrared homing seeker capable of identifying targets with an extremely low infrared signature, such as other missiles or UAVs, in addition to aircraft and helicopters, and a penetrator warhead to engage semi-armored targets such as gunship helicopters. The seeker was largely adopted by the IRIS-T missile.

== Platforms ==
The missile was to be launched vertically, e.g., from stationary launch platforms, trucks or armored vehicles such as the GTK Boxer and the Ozelot, or horizontally from helicopters such as the Eurocopter Tiger.

Being a part of Germany's SysFla project, the LFK NG was to be integrated into stationary and mobile air defence launch platforms. The project was cancelled c. 2011.

== Specifications ==
- Length: 1.8 m
- Caliber: 110 mm
- Range: 10,000 m
- Speed: Up to Mach 2.2
- Weight: 28 kg
- Warhead: 2.5 kg

== See also ==
- MEADS – the future air defence system of the German German Air Force.
- MANTIS – the very short-range protection system of the German Army within the "SysFla" program.
- SPYDER – (Israel)
