= Edward Miller & Co =

Edward Miller & Co.
- Founded: 1844
- Fate: Assets transferred to form the Miller Company, Meriden, CT (1924-)
- Headquarters: Meriden, Connecticut, United States
- Area served: The United States and internationally
- Key people: Edward Miller
- Products: Primarily lamps and lighting systems

Edward Miller & Co. (1844–1924) was formed in Meriden, Connecticut, and is primarily known as a historical manufacturer of lamps. The company also made brass kettles and oil heaters. In 1866, the corporation was formed with capital of $200,000. Its earlier beginning included being started by Horatio Howard. The following year the business was sold to Edward Miller.

In the 1870s, the company grew and new stores were opened at 56-58 Park Place and 51-53 Barclay Street in New York, N.Y. Stores were also opened in Boston, at 38 Pearl Street, and Chicago. Also, salesrooms were opened in Philadelphia and San Francisco.

In 1893, Edward Miller & Co. employed about 700 people.

By 1916, the company had salesrooms in Boston (201 Congress Street), New York (68 and 70 Park Place), and Philadelphia (1727 Chestnut Street).

On February 24, 1924, Edward Miller & Co. assets, "property, good will and business as a going concern", were formally transferred to "The Miller Company" (1924–present).

During its years of operation, the company exhibited in national and international expositions. These include the 1876 Centennial Exposition, for which the company received an award. Also, Edward Miller & Co. exhibited in the 1879-80 Sydney International Exhibition and 1881 Melbourne International Exhibition in Australia; the 1889 Meriden Opera House exhibition; the 1899 Greater America Exposition in Omaha, Nebraska; and the 1901 Pan-American Exposition in Buffalo, New York. Museums holding the company's design in their collections include the Connecticut Historical Society in Hartford; the Corning Museum of Glass in Corning, New York; The Henry Ford in Dearborn, Michigan, as well as museums in Australia and New Zealand.

The Miller Company manufactured electric lamps through the 20th century. The Miller Company was sold to Diehl in 2000, becoming a distributor of fine metals.
