= HOPE/HOSBO =

German family of precision-guided glide bombs

The HOPE (HOchleistungs-PEnetrator = High-Performance Penetrator) and HOSBO (HOchleistungs-SprengBOmbe = High-Performance Explosive Bomb) are two precision-guided munitions that were under development by Diehl Defence for the German Luftwaffe. German officials have stated that HOPE has greater penetration capability than a USAF GBU-28 munition.

A first test flight with HOPE, carried by a Tornado of the German Air Force, took place on 9 April 2008 in Manching, Germany. A further successful test of the HOPE munition was carried out at the Swedish test range at Vidsel on 14 September 2008.

Diehl BGT was expected to reach production readiness in 2010, although neither the weapon nor the integration has been ordered so far. The project has been suspended by Diehl.

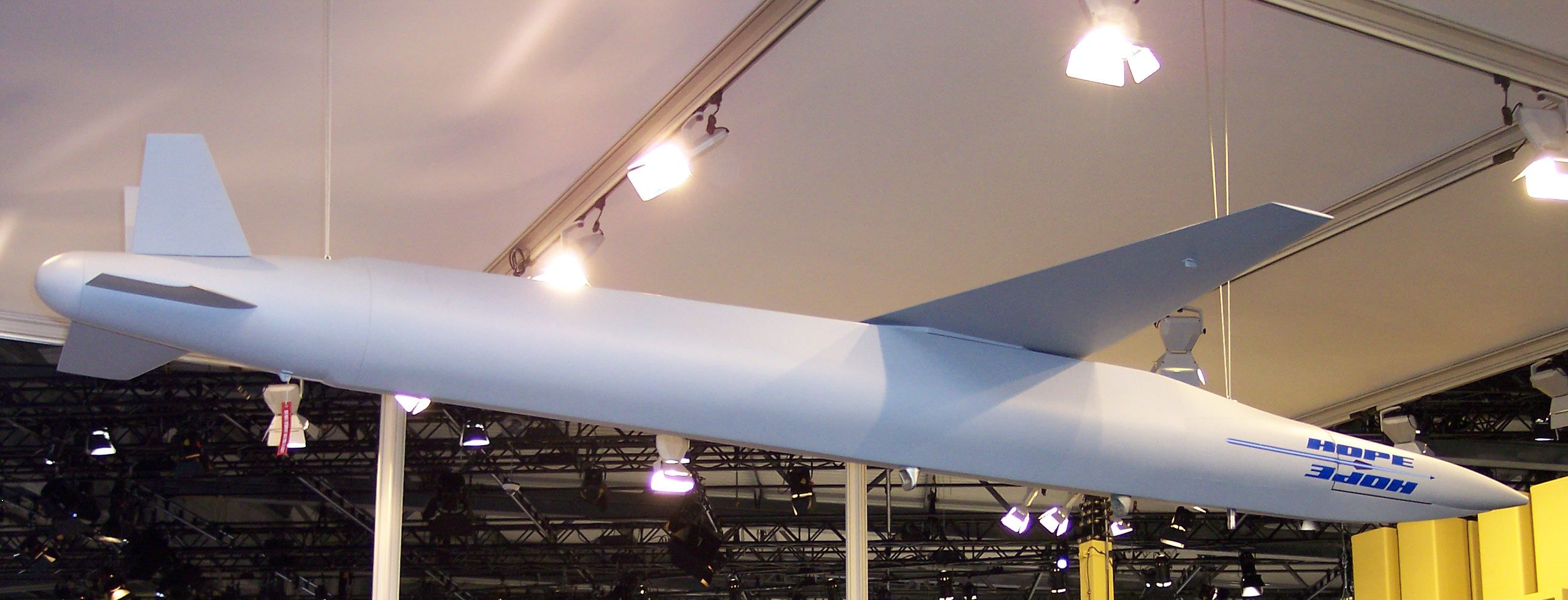
HOPE at the ILA2006

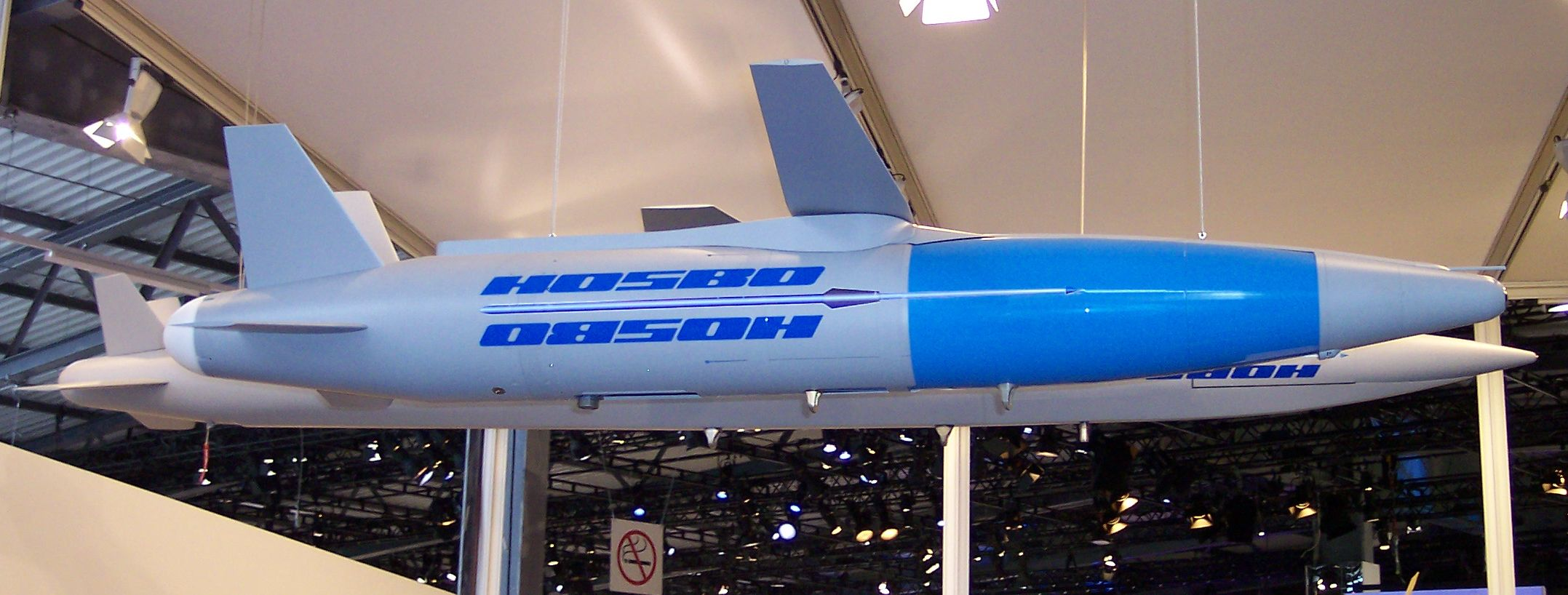
HOSBO at the ILA2006

== HOPE ==
HOPE is a glide bomb with high maneuverability, developed specifically to engage hardened targets, such as tunnels and subterranean bunkers, but also moving targets. HOPE has a range of more than 160 kilometres (99 mi) and contains internal GPS/INS and electro-optical guidance.

== HOSBO ==
HOSBO is a highly maneuverable glide bomb that can be equipped with modular warheads, including non-lethal ones such as a High-Power Microwave (HPM) weapon. Range and guidance are the same as that of HOPE.

== Specifications ==
- Name: HOPE/HOSBO
- Prime contractor: Diehl BGT Defence
- Range: 160 km (99 mi)
- Length: HOPE: 5 m (16.4 ft); HOSBO: 3.5 m (11.5 ft)
- Weight: HOPE: 1,400 kg (3,086 lb); HOSBO: 907 kg (2,000 lb)
- Diameter: Approx 40 cm (16 in)
- Guidance: GPS/INS and electro-optical (EO) video feedback

== Platforms ==
- Eurofighter Typhoon
- Panavia Tornado

== See also ==
- Taurus missile – (Sweden, Germany)
- AGM-154 Joint Standoff Weapon – (United States)
- SOM (missile) – (Turkey)
