= DM51 hand grenade =

DM51
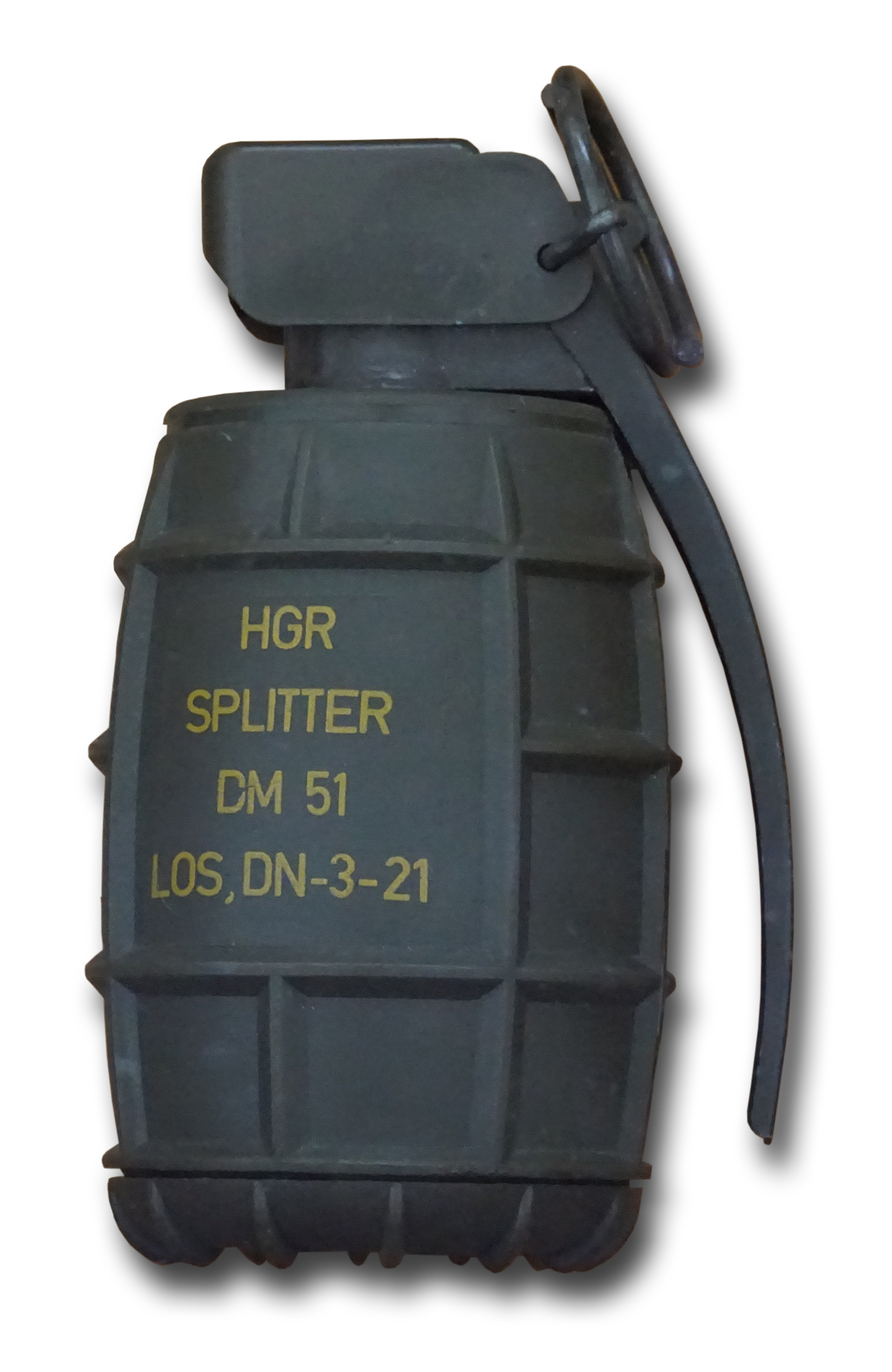
- A DM51 hand grenade in defensive configuration with its fragmentation jacket attached.
- Type: Hand grenade
- Place of origin: West Germany

Service history
- In service: 1978–…
- Used by: See Users
- Wars: Russo-Ukrainian War

Production history
- Designer: Diehl Defence
- Designed: 1970s
- Manufacturer: Diehl Defence
- Unit cost: €33.60 (1996)
- Produced: 1970s–…
- Variants: See Variants

Specifications
- Mass: 430 g (15 oz) (with fuse)
- Height: 107 mm (4.2 in) (with fuse)
- Diameter: 57 mm (2.2 in) (with fragmentation jacket); 66 mm (2.6 in) (with safety lever)
- Filling: PETN
- Filling weight: 60 g (2.1 oz)
- Detonation mechanism: DM82 delay fuse

The DM51 (German: Deutsches Modell 51, lit. 'German Model 51') is a German hand grenade. Designed and manufactured by Diehl Defence since 1978, the grenade features both defensive and offensive configurations. The DM51 is the only type of hand grenade used by the Bundeswehr.

== Design ==
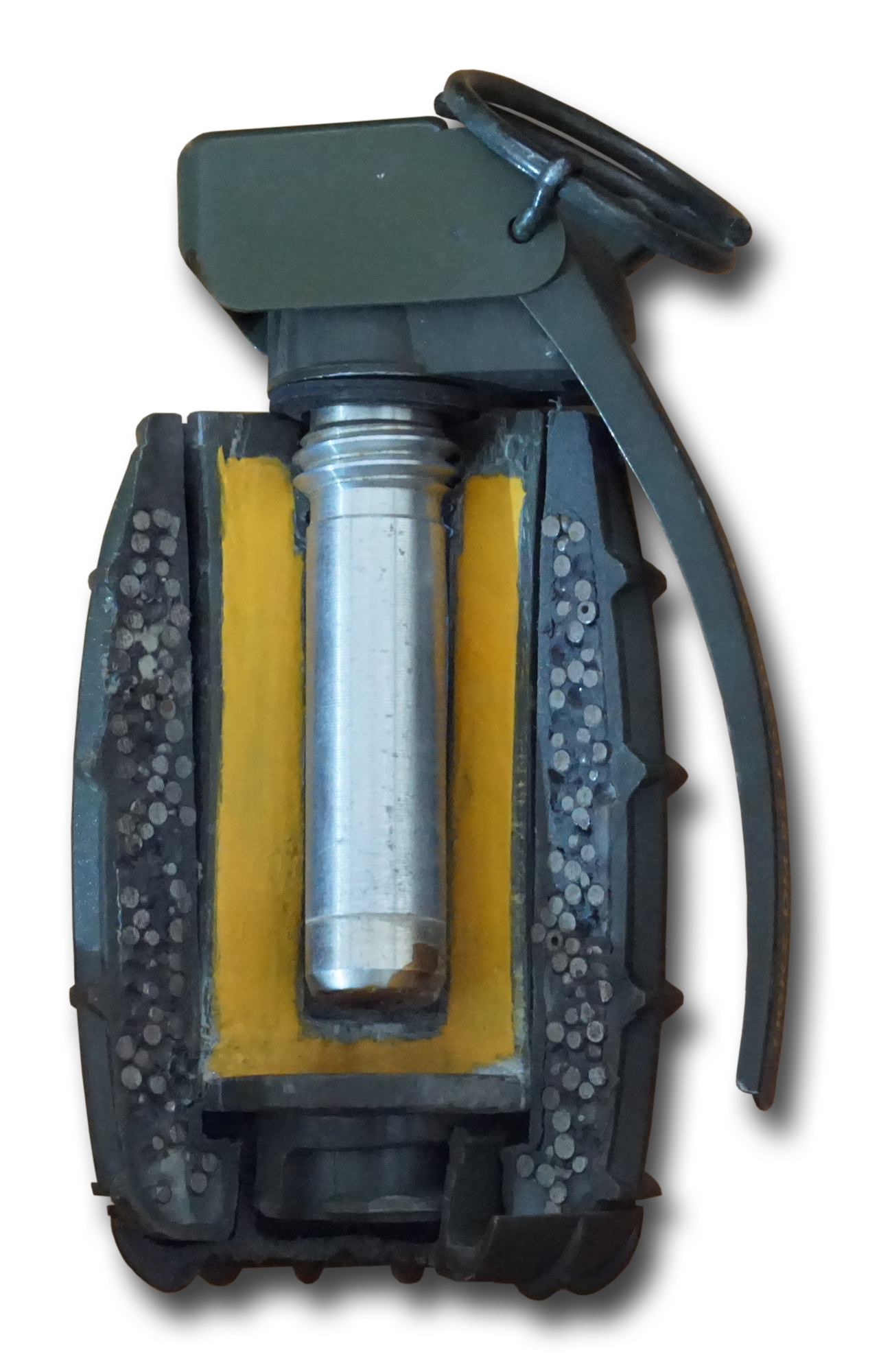
A cut-away of a DM51 grenade reveals its pentaerythritol tetranitrate (PETN) explosive filling and steel fragments embedded in plastic.

The DM51 hand grenade consists of a small plastic cylinder filled with 60 g (2.1 oz) of pentaerythritol tetranitrate (PETN), a lever-release DM82 fuse (including a safety clip) with a 3–5 second delay, and an oval fragmentation jacket with flat ends. The DM82 delay fuse and the grenade body are joined by a 5/8“ thread. The plastic fragmentation jacket is filled with 6,500 preshaped steel fragments that have a lethal range of 10 m (33 ft). The jacket is attached to the body of the grenade by a captive base screw at the bottom of the fragmentation jacket.

The DM51 is delivered in its defensive configuration (with all components attached). In its offensive configuration, the fragmentation jacket is removed from the body of the grenade. Elements of the DM51 can be attached or removed whenever necessary. It is also possible to join several grenade bodies to form cluster or elongated charges for combat engineering purposes. DM51 hand grenades are supplied completely assembled in a plastic storage box that holds ten grenades.

== Operational history ==
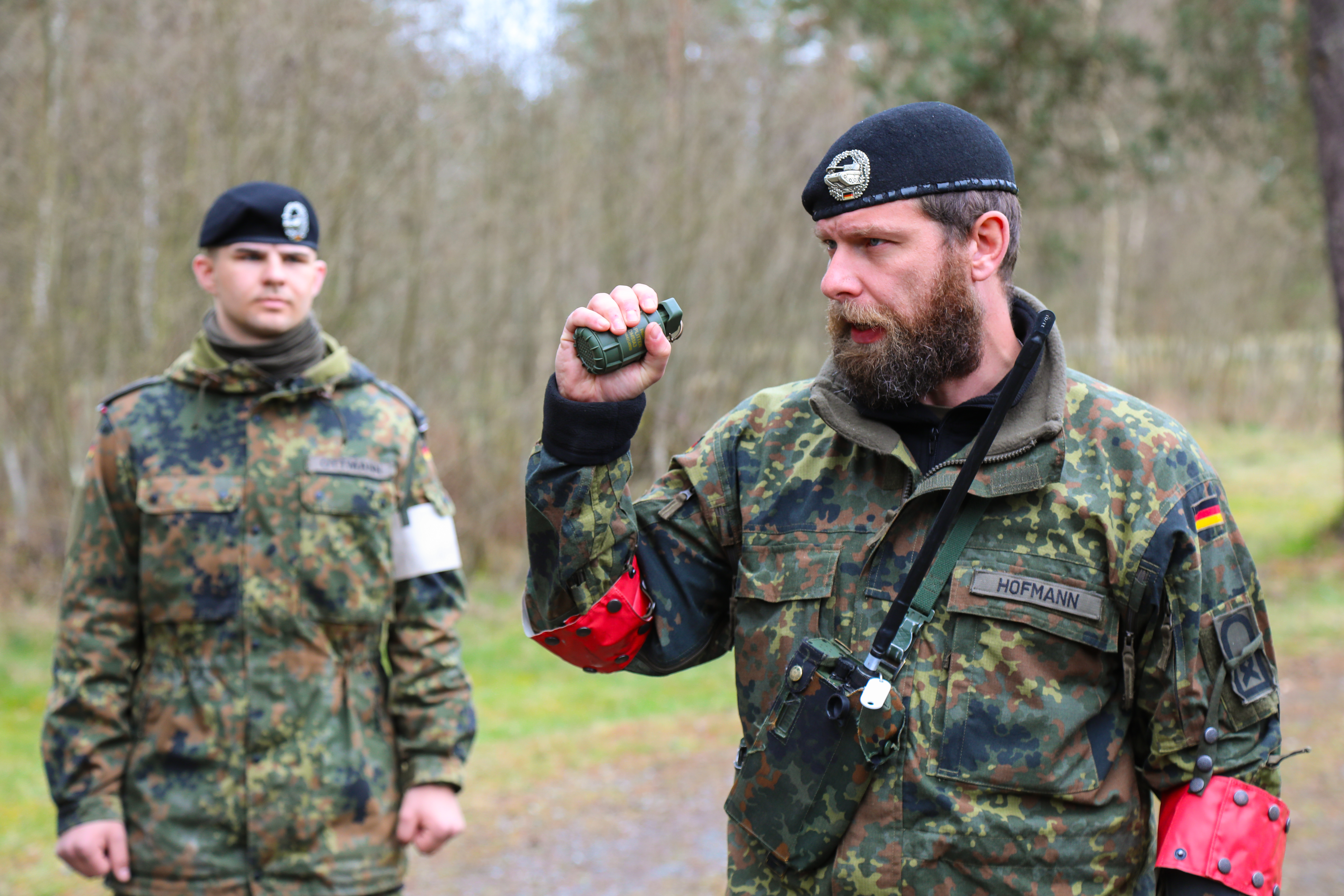
Bundeswehr soldiers conducting hand grenade training with the DM51 in the Grafenwoehr Training Area.

Prior to the 1970s, West Germany utilised foreign-designed grenades and their locally produced versions. For example, the DM41 was a German-manufactured version of the United States' M26A1 grenade. In 1978, the Bundeswehr adopted the DM51 designed by Diehl Defence to supersede the DM41 in service. The DM51 is supplemented by the DM61, also designed by Diehl Defence.

The Bundeshwer remains a major user of the DM51 – it is the only type of hand grenade in service with the forces. In September 2024, the Bundeswehr ordered 100,000 DM51A3 grenades. In December of the same year, a framework agreement was approved for the order of DM51 hand grenades with DM82 fuses. It was followed by a firm order of 557,400 grenades in March 2025.

After the full-scale Russian invasion of Ukraine in 2022, Germany provided Ukraine 100,000 hand grenades as military aid. The grenades supplied to Ukraine were DM51/DM51A2, which were drawn from Bundeswehr stock.

== Variants ==
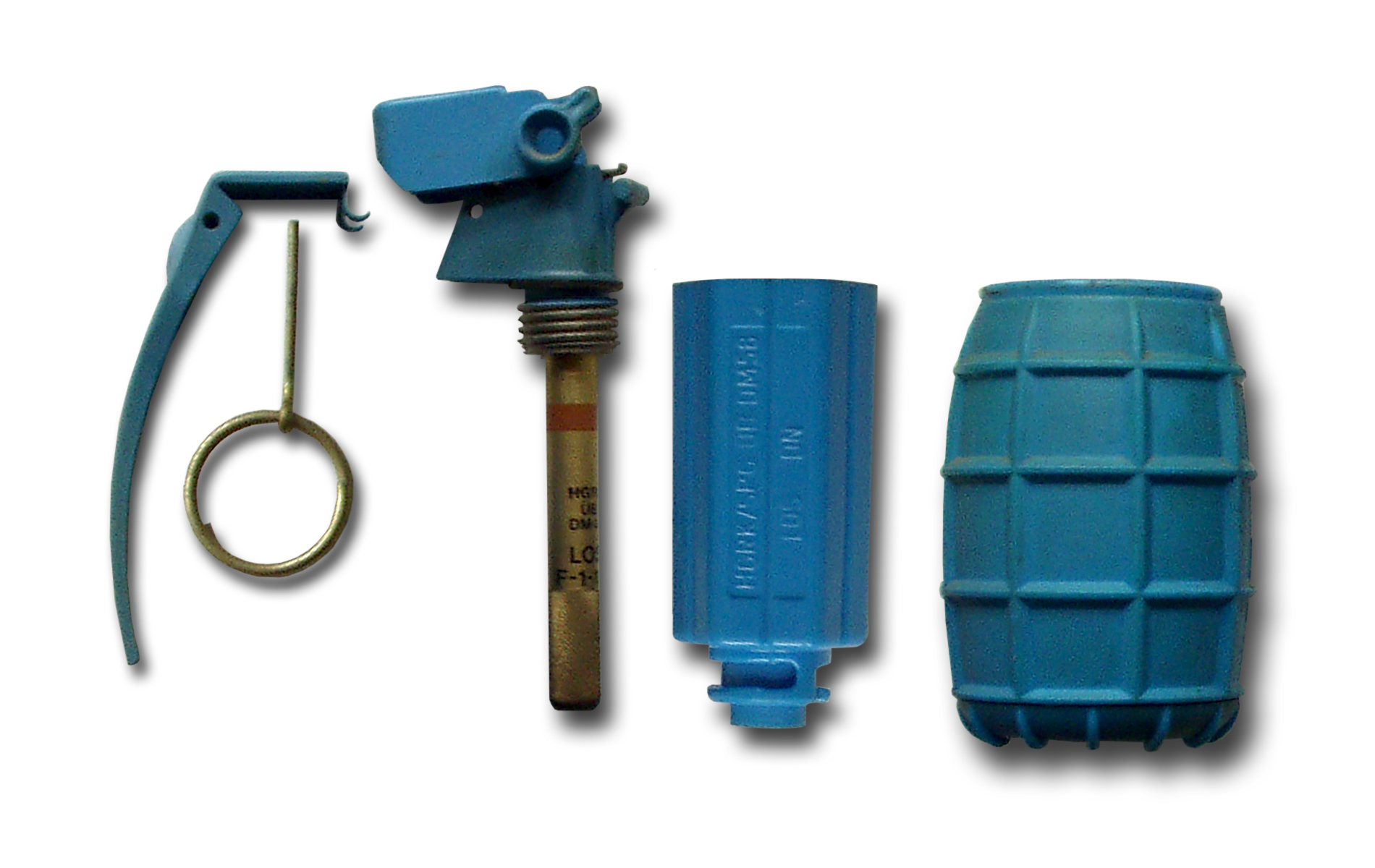
A disassembled DM58 practice hand grenade, which incorporates design changes to facilitate differentiating its components from those of live grenades.

- The DM51 is the earliest version of the hand grenade with a DM82A1 fuse. It entered service in 1978.
- The DM51A1 has an improved DM82A1B1 fuse.
- The DM51A2 includes the improved DM82A1B1 fuse and minor changes compared to the DM51A1 version.
- The DM51A3 has an improved precursor charge. This version of the hand grenade was adopted in 2006. The DM51A3 grenades ordered by Bundeswehr in 2024 are delivered with DM82A4 fuses.
- The DM58 is a practice hand grenade designed to emulate the DM51 hand grenade in shape, weight, and handling characteristics. Its body and fuse top are reusable, although the safety pin and charge must be replaced after each use. The components of the DM58 are moulded from blue plastic and are designed to be easily distinguishable from those of live DM51 grenades.

== Users ==
=== Current ===
- Germany
- Ukraine
  - 100,000 donated by Germany in 2022

=== Former ===
- West Germany

== Similar weapons ==
- Arges Type HG 84 – (Austria)
- F1 grenade – (Australia)
- HG 85 – (Switzerland)
- M67 grenade – (United States)
- M75 hand grenade – (Yugoslavia)
- Mecar M72 – (Belgium)
- RGN hand grenade – (Russia)
- RGO hand grenade – (Russia, Soviet Union)
- Scalable Offensive Hand Grenade – (Norway, Sweden)
- SFG 87 – (Singapore)
- Spränghandgranat 07 – (Sweden)

== See also ==
- List of modern equipment of the German Army
