= ARMIGER =

Supersonic anti-radiation missile

The ARMIGER (Anti Radiation Missile with Intelligent Guidance & Extended Range) was a missile developed by the Diehl BGT Defence to replace existing AGM-88 HARM missiles in the German Air Force by the end of the decade. It was to be an advanced high supersonic missile intended to destroy modern and future air defenses through direct hit. Its development has been stopped, mainly on the cost basis.

ARMIGER was to feature an IR seeker, accurate Inertial Measurement Unit (INS) for navigational purposes, long range, high supersonic speed, reliability, and direct hit capability. It was to be powered by a combined rocket-ramjet, and would use a dual-mode seeker.

== See also ==
- Anti-radiation missile
- List of missiles
