= Euromissile =

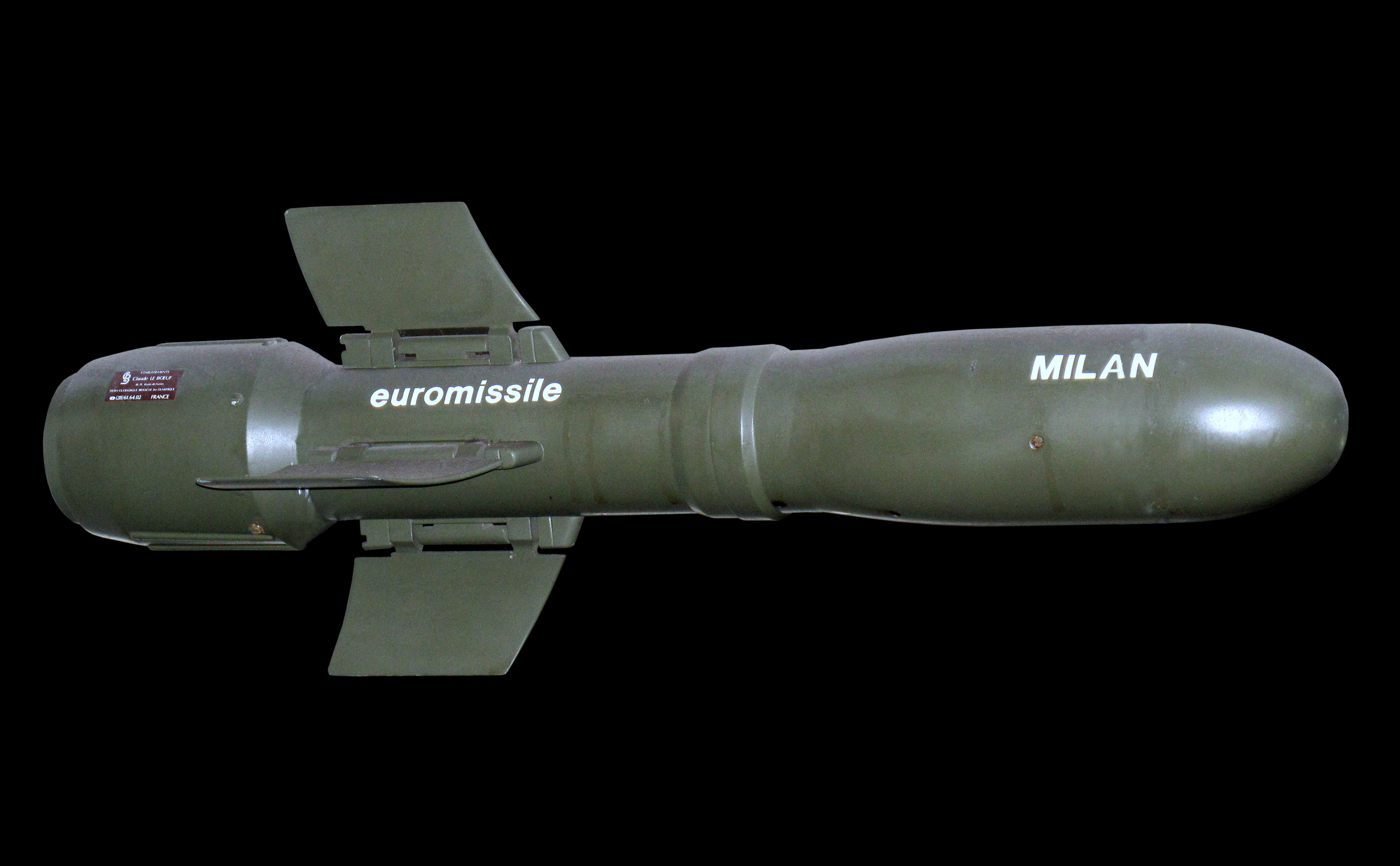
Euromissile Milan

Euromissile was a European consortium set up in the 1970s by France's Aérospatiale and West Germany's DaimlerChrysler Aerospace AG to produce the Euromissile HOT anti-tank missile.

On April 5, 1991, Thomson-CSF joined the Euromissile Economic Interest Group (GIE) to jointly develop the short-range anti-aircraft system Crotale NG.

Later on Aérospatiale-Matra, DaimlerChrysler Aerospace AG (DASA) (as well as Construcciones Aeronáuticas SA (CASA)) merged on 10 July 2000 to form the European Aeronautic Defence and Space Company (EADS), now known as Airbus. All missile activities of the former parent companies are now part of MBDA, where Airbus owns a 37.5 % share.

== Missiles ==
- HOT (missile)
- MILAN
- Roland (missile)
