= EganaGoldpfeil (Holdings) Ltd. =

- Founded: 1972
- Headquarters: Kowloon, Hong Kong
- Area served: Japan
- Key people: Hans-Joerg Seeberger (Chairman & CEO); Peter Ka Yue Lee (Executive Director)
- Products: Jewellery
- Website: Official Site

EganaGoldpfeil (formerly Egana International) (SEHK: 48) was a Cayman Islands-registered, Hong Kong Stock Exchange-listed holding company active in fashion, watches, jewelry and leather goods. The European part of the company filed for bankruptcy in 2008. The entire company was subsequently wound up.

The company produced timepieces and jewelry under brands such as Pierre Cardin and Carrera, as well as licensed names as Bulova or Esprit. They also produce leather goods, eyewear and apparel. Their products are sold in more than 100 countries.

Company has produced and has been selling the most expensive randoseru (approx. US$1000) since 2007.
