= Diehl Defence =

German defense company

- Type: GmbH
- Headquarters: Germany
- Products: Missiles, anti-aircraft defence systems, active protection systems, electronic countermeasures, precision-guided munitions, ammunition
- Revenue: ▲€2,331 million (2025)
- Number of employees: ▲5,406 (2025)
- Parent: Diehl Stiftung & Co. KG

Diehl Defence GmbH & Co. KG is a German weapon manufacturer headquartered in Überlingen. It operates as a division of Diehl Stiftung and specializes in the production of missiles and ammunition.

Diehl BGT Defence was established in 2004 through the merger of Bodenseewerke Gerätetechnik GmbH and Diehl Munitionssysteme GmbH & Co. KG. In February 2017, Diehl BGT Defence and Diehl Defence Holding were integrated into Diehl Defence.

In 1960, Bodenseewerke Gerätetechnik became the lead contractor for producing the American Sidewinder AIM-9B air-to-air missile in Europe.

Building on the knowledge gained from the Sidewinder's infrared homing technology, Diehl Defence developed the seeker system for the IRIS-T short-range air-to-air missile. Introduced in 2005, the IRIS-T has been adopted by 13 countries as of October 2022.

== Manufacturing ==
A cooperation agreement worth ₹10,000 crore (equivalent to ₹100 billion or US$1.1 billion in 2026), was signed on June 10, 2025, between Diehl Defence, and Reliance Defence to produce the Vulcano 155mm precision-guided munition system in India. Core technology and guidance system will be supplied by Diehl Defence, while Reliance Defence will act as the primary manufacturer. A greenfield facility will manufacture it at Ratnagiri's Watad Industrial Area. It is anticipated that the project will contribute to India's ₹50,000 crore (US$5.2 billion) defence export target by 2029 and help the country's Aatmanirbhar Bharat vision by delivering over 50% indigenous content.

In June 2026 they company announced in interest in producing FP-5 Flamingo cruise missiles with an uprated seeker.

== Products ==
- AIM-9 Sidewinder
- AGM ARMIGER
- EUROSPIKE
- IRIS-T
- IRIS-T SL / IRIS-T SLS (in addition to MEADS)
- Dornier Viper
- Fliegerfaust 2 - Licensed development and production of the STINGER POST missile from the late 1980s onwards (from 2004 onwards in a joint venture with Raytheon). Diehl was originally project coordinator, with Dornier as general contractor and Bodenseewerk producing the guidance systems. Eventually Diehl absorbed the respective interests and responsibilities of those companies in the program.
- GMLRS
- HOPE/HOSBO
- IDAS (submarine-launched missile, planned for the new Type 212 submarine)
- Barracuda (coprecipitating torpedo)
- LFK NG
- PARS 3 LR
- Panzerfaust 3
- RIM-116 Rolling Airframe Missile
- RBS-15
- SMArt 155

=== Grenades ===
- DM51 Offensive-Defensive Hand Grenade
  - DM58 Practice Hand Grenade
- DM61 Defensive Hand Grenade
  - DM78 Practice Hand Grenade
- DM82 Hand Grenade Fuse
- MK7 Mod 0 Floating Smoke Pot
- 76mm IR/RP Smoke Grenade
- 76mm IR/RP Airburst Grenade
- 80/81mm IR/RP Smoke Grenade
- RASMO Rapid Smoke Hand Grenade

== Gallery ==
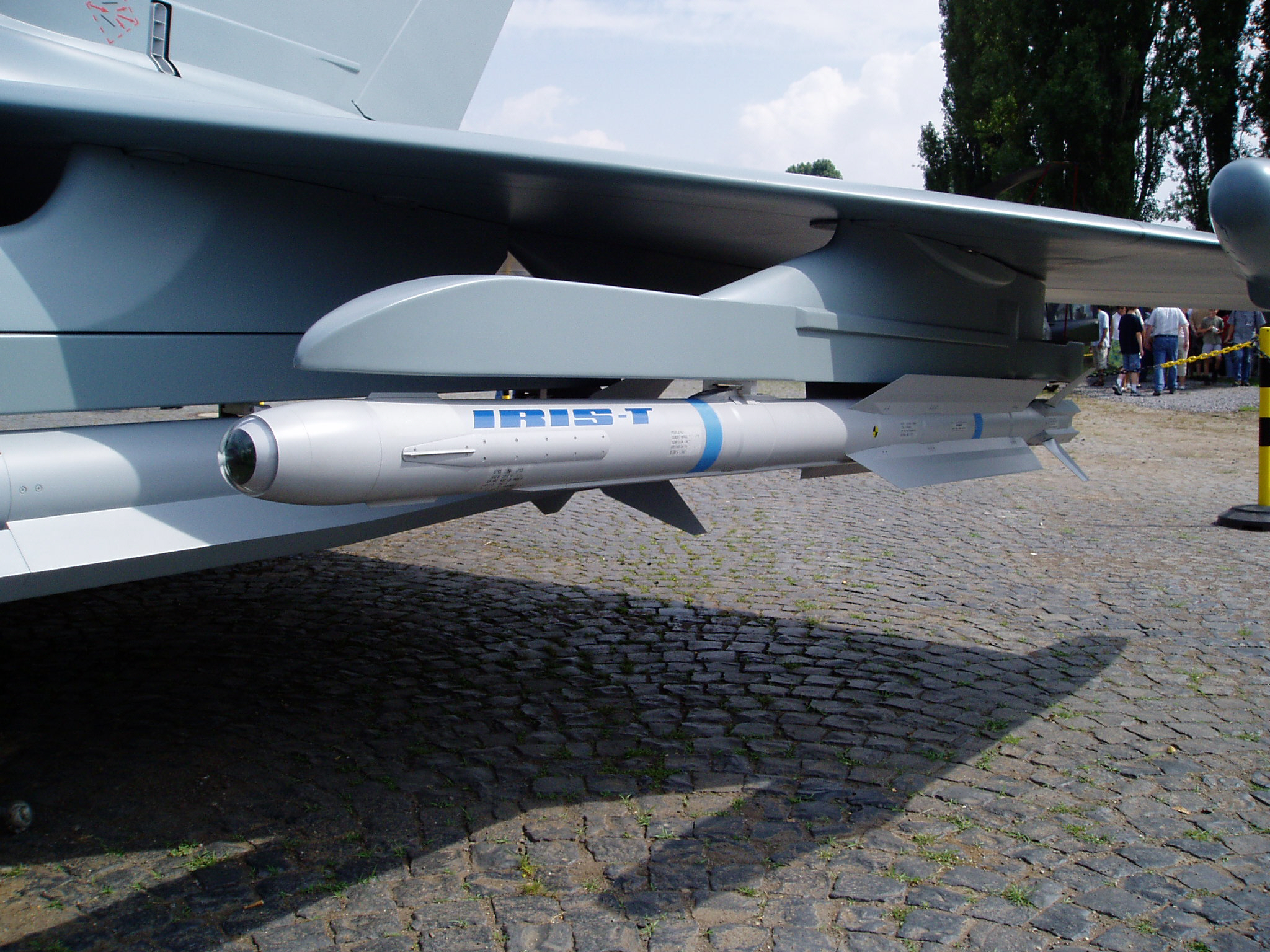
IRIS-T

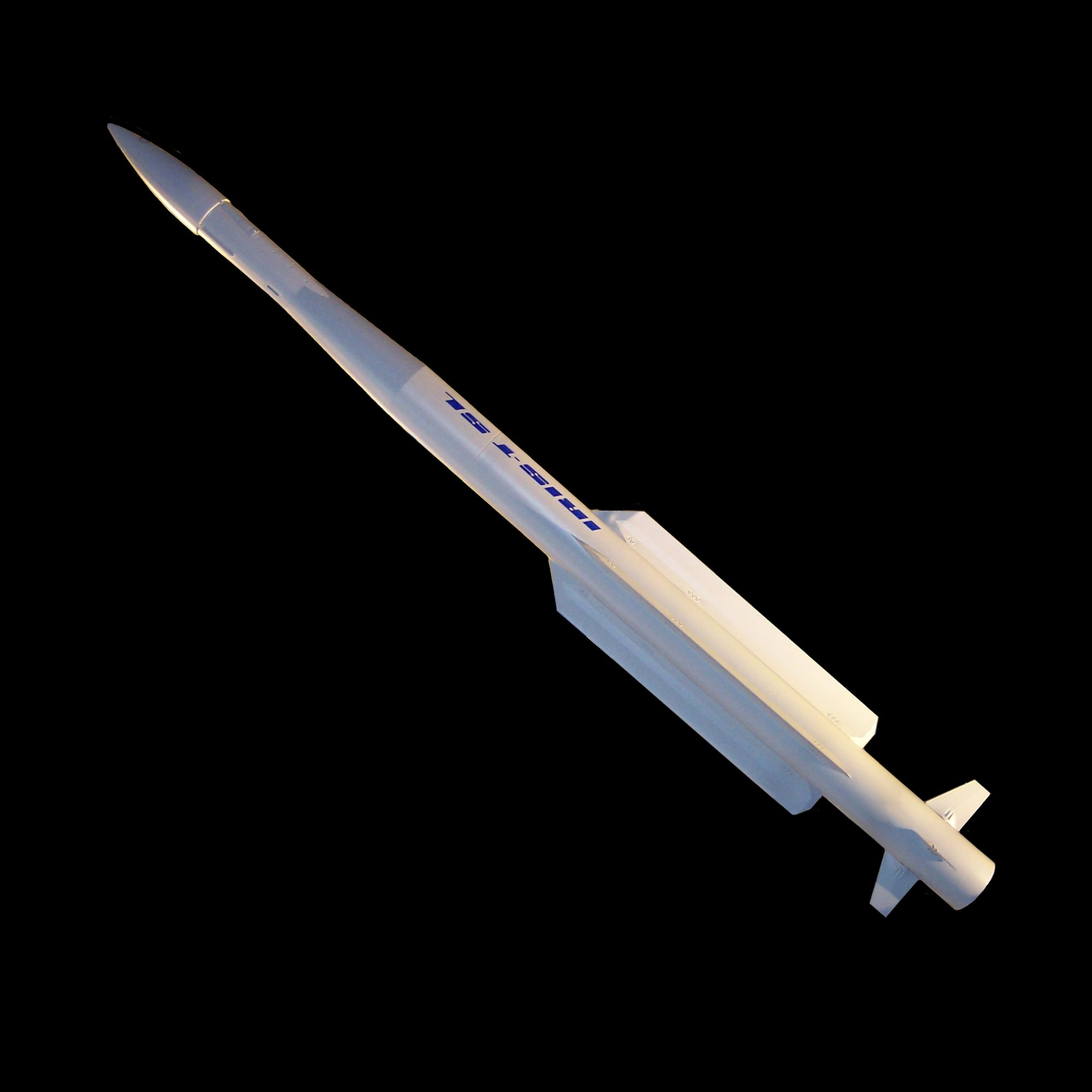
IRIS-T SL

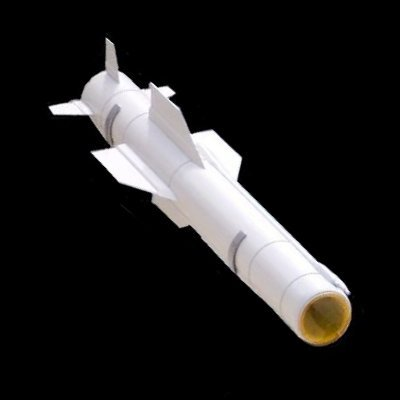
PARS 3 LR

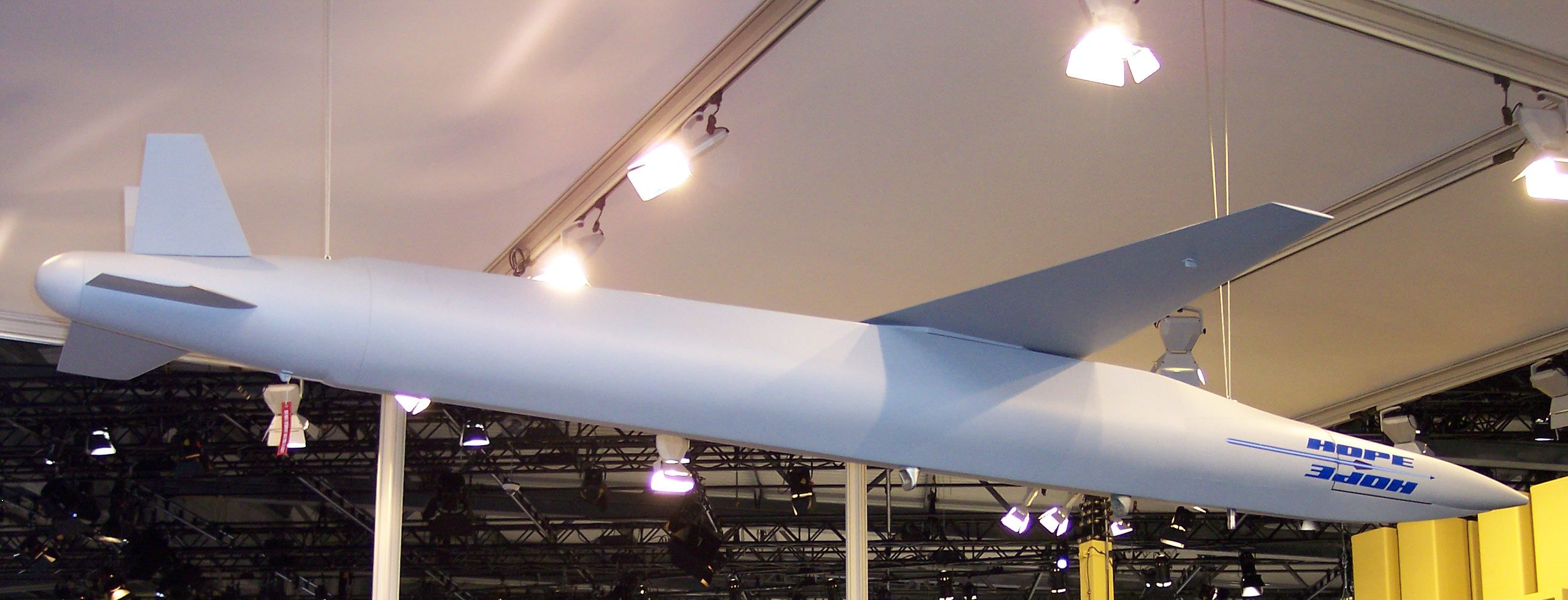
HOPE

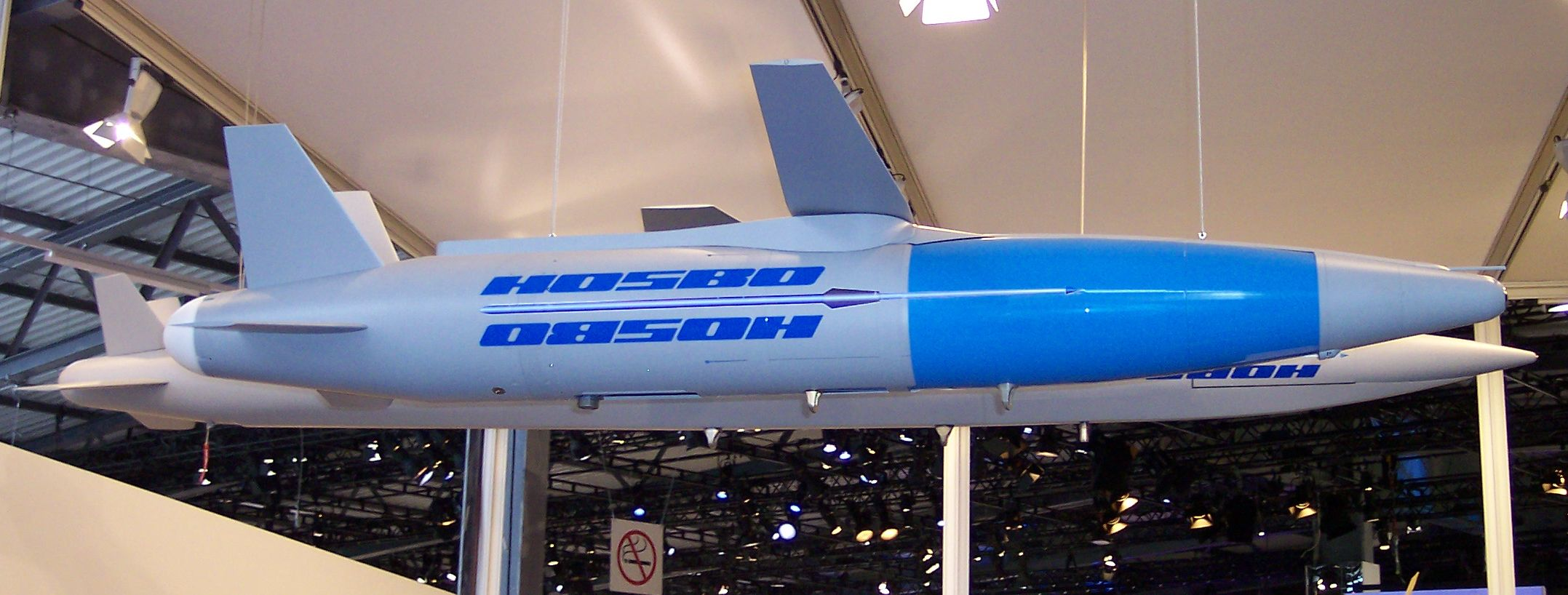
HOSBO

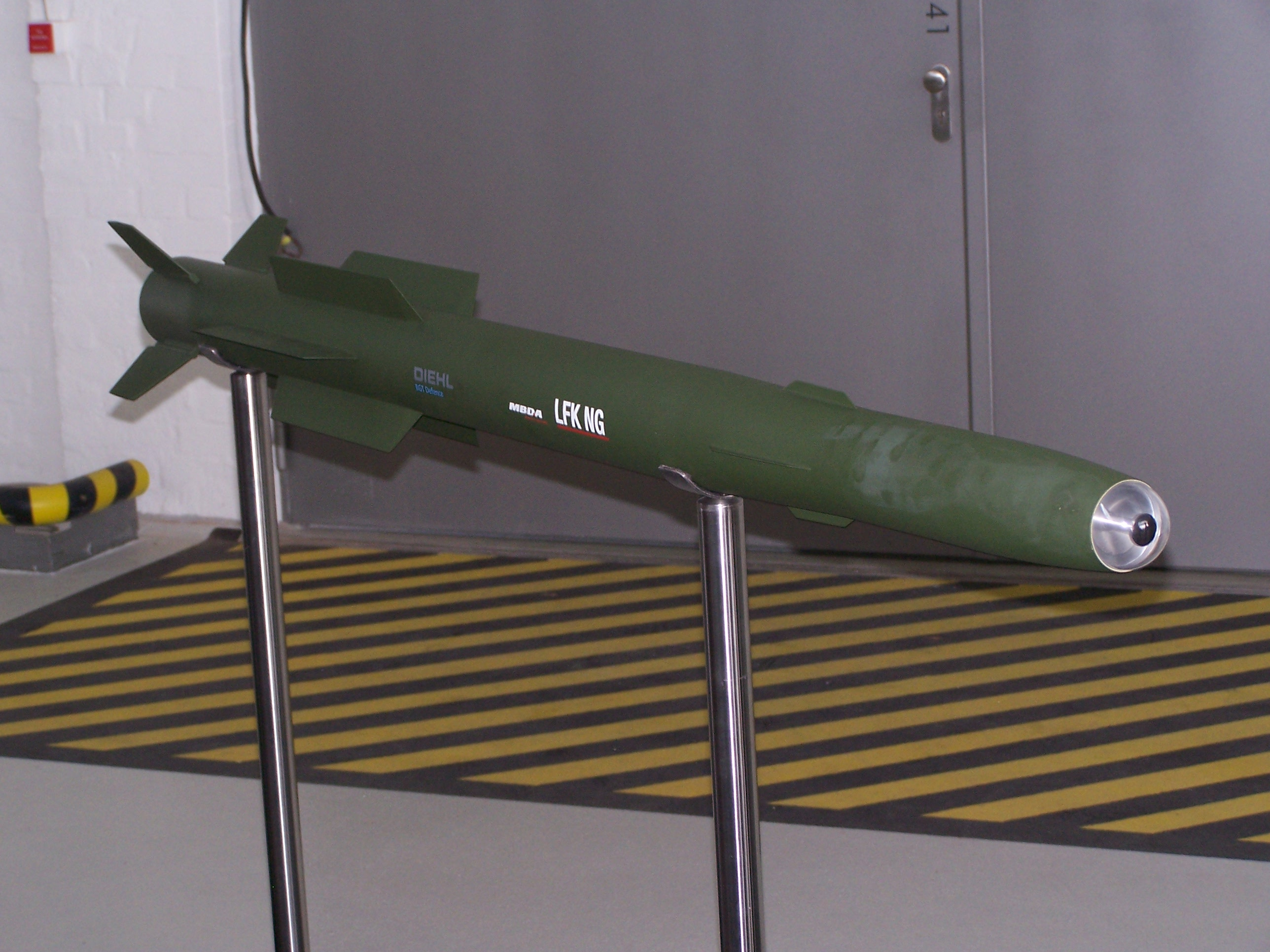
LFK NG

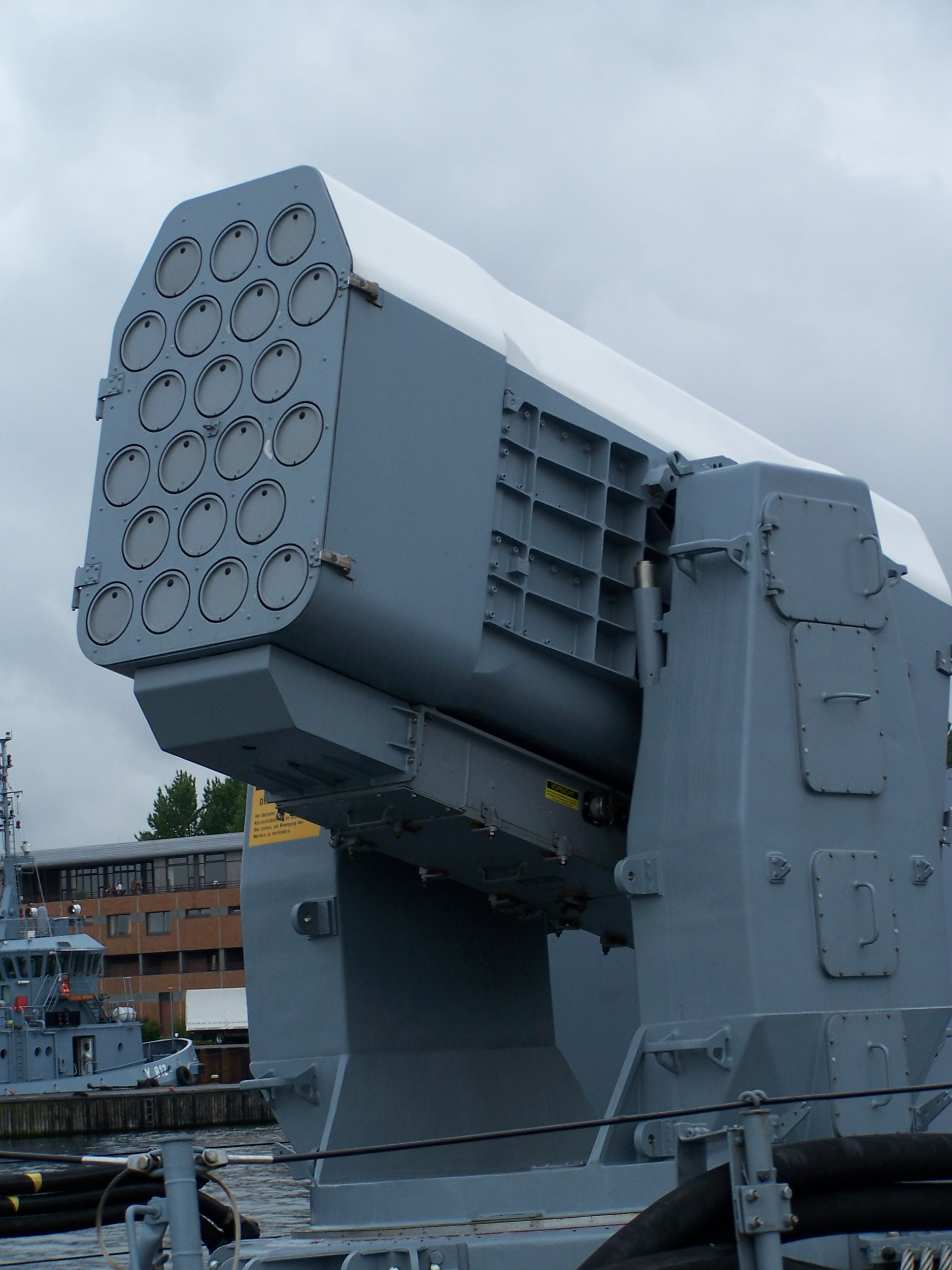
RIM-116 RAM launcher onboard on S74 Nerz, a Gepard class fast attack craft of the German Navy

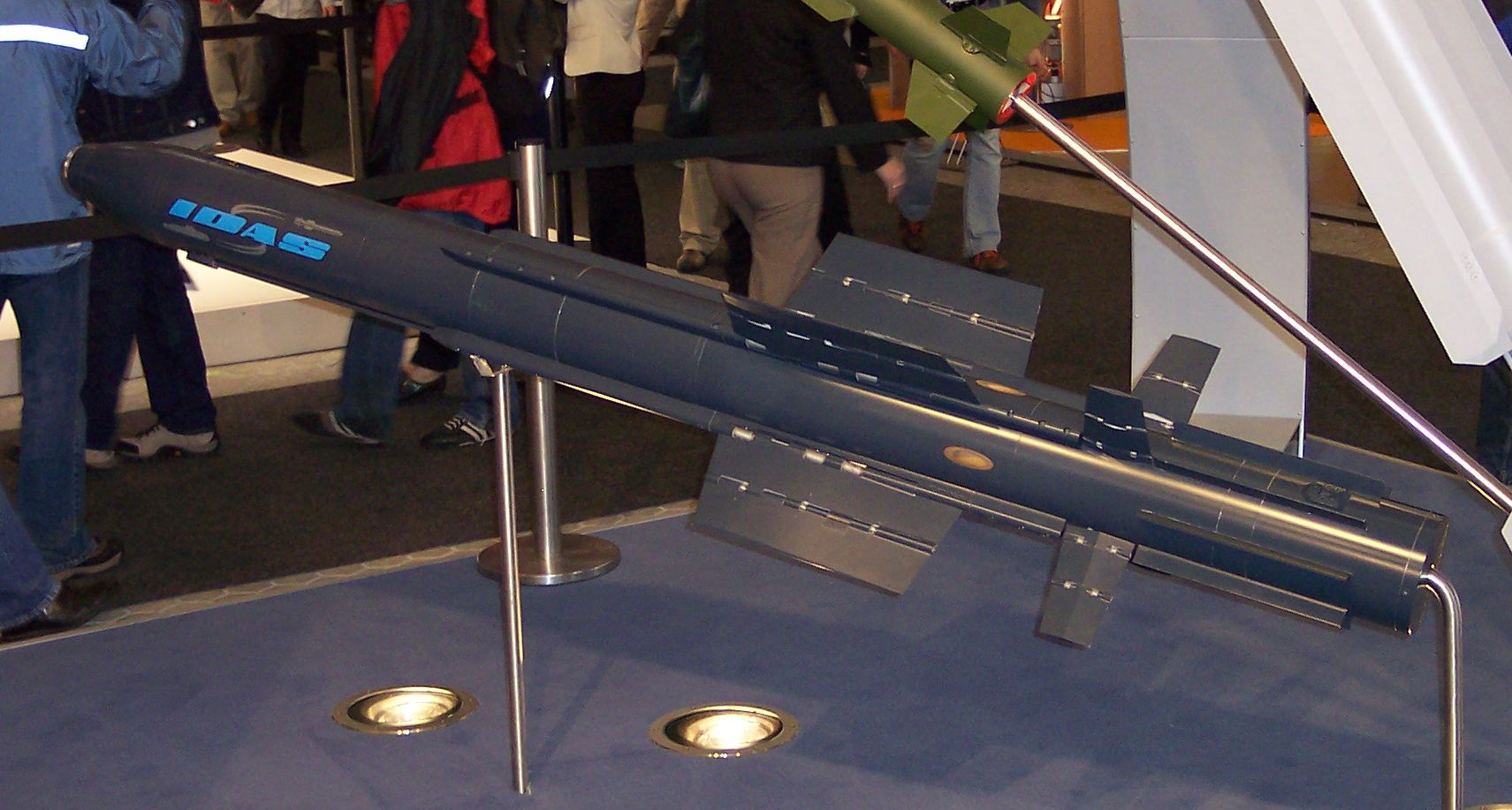
Model of IDAS at the ILA 2006

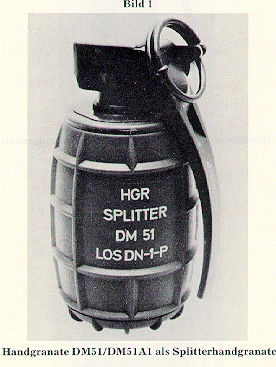
Splitterhandgranate DM51

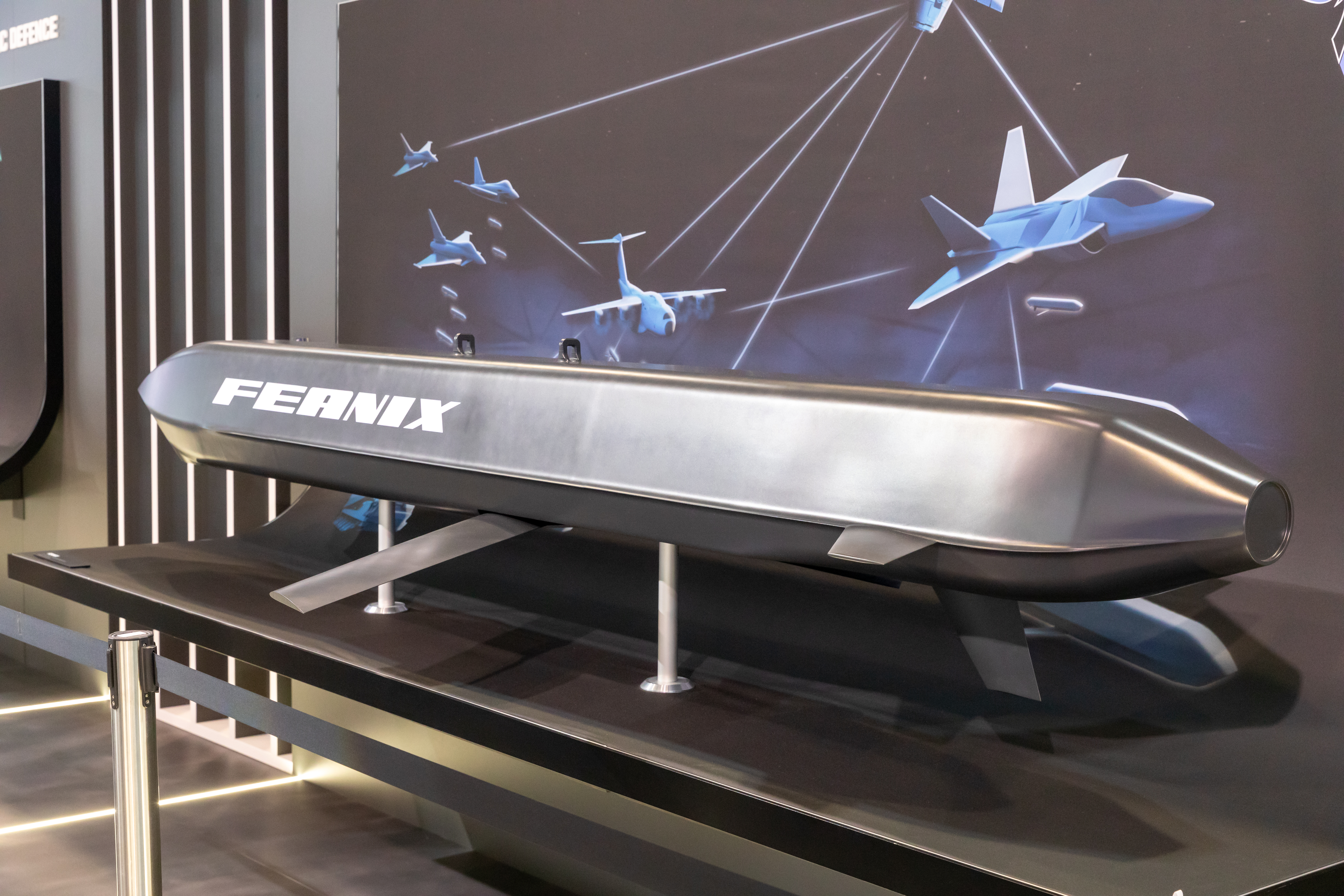
FEANIX (Future Effector - Adaptable, Networked, Intelligent, Xpendable)
