= Röthenbach an der Pegnitz =

- Town
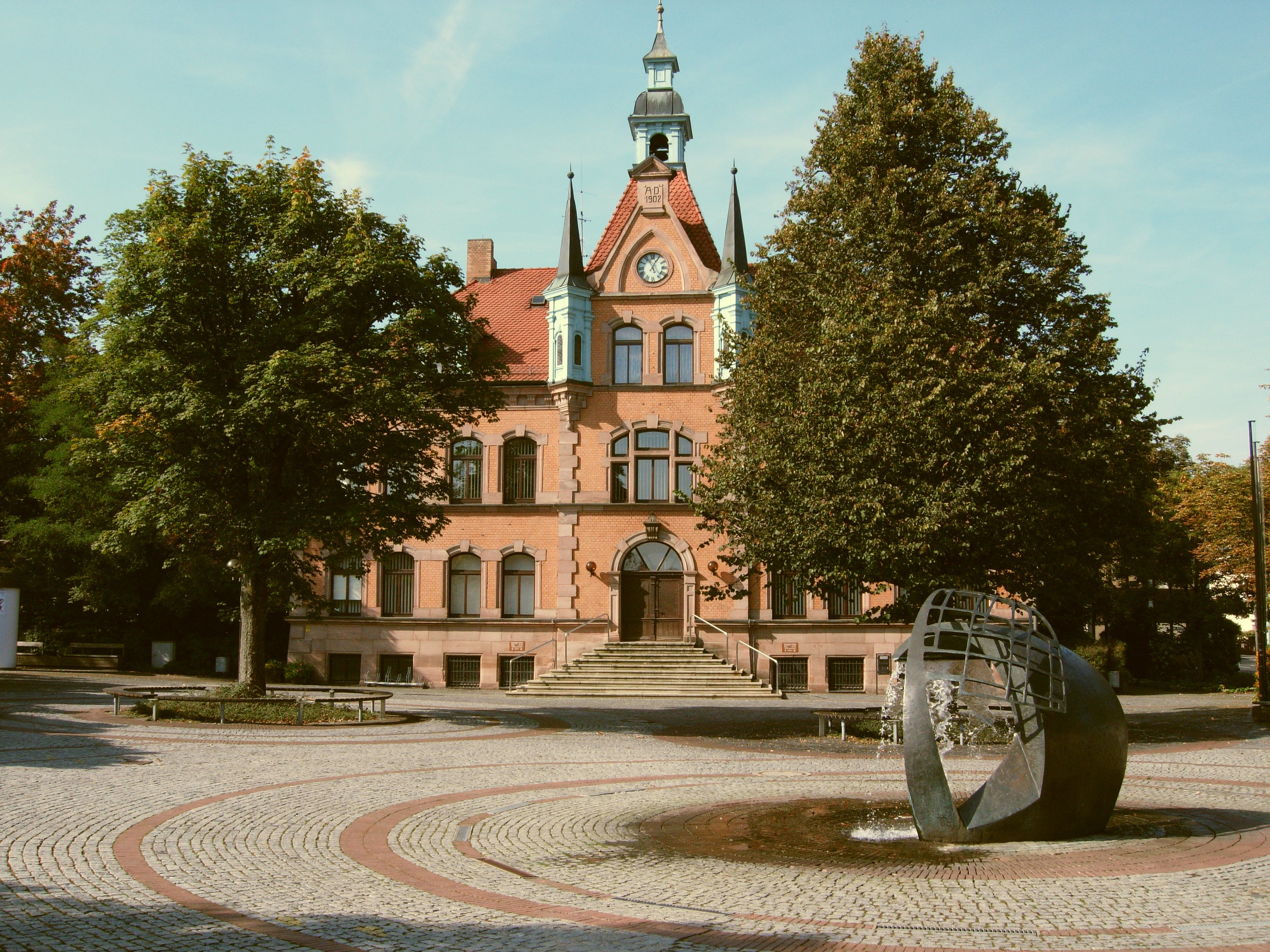
- Town hall

- Coat of arms

- Location of Röthenbach an der Pegnitz within Nürnberger Land district
- Interactive map of Röthenbach an der Pegnitz
- Location within Germany Location within Bavaria
- Coordinates: 49°29′05″N 11°14′51″E
- Country: Germany
- State: Bavaria
- Admin. region: Mittelfranken
- District: Nürnberger Land
- Subdivisions: 7 Stadtteile

Government
  - Mayor (2020–26): Klaus Hacker (FW)

Area
  - Total: 14.29 km^{2} (5.52 sq mi)
- Elevation: 329 m (1,079 ft)

Population (2025-12-31)
  - Total: 12,512
  - Density: 875.6/km^{2} (2,268/sq mi)
- Time zone: UTC+01:00 (CET)
  - Summer (DST): UTC+02:00 (CEST)
- Postal codes: 90552
- Dialling codes: 0911
- Vehicle registration: LAU, ESB, HEB, N, PEG
- Website: www.roethenbach.de

Röthenbach an der Pegnitz (German pronunciation: [ˈʁøːtn̩bax ʔan deːɐ̯ ˈpeːɡnɪts], lit. 'Röthenbach on the Pegnitz') is a town in the district of Nürnberger Land, in Bavaria, Germany. It is situated on the Pegnitz River, 4 km southwest of Lauf an der Pegnitz, and 12 km east of Nuremberg (centre).

== Notable people ==
- Sercan Sararer (born 1989 in Nürnberg), football player, grew up in Röthenbach
