= Enhanced Tactical Multi-Purpose =

American hand grenade

ET-MP Enhanced Tactical Multi-Purpose
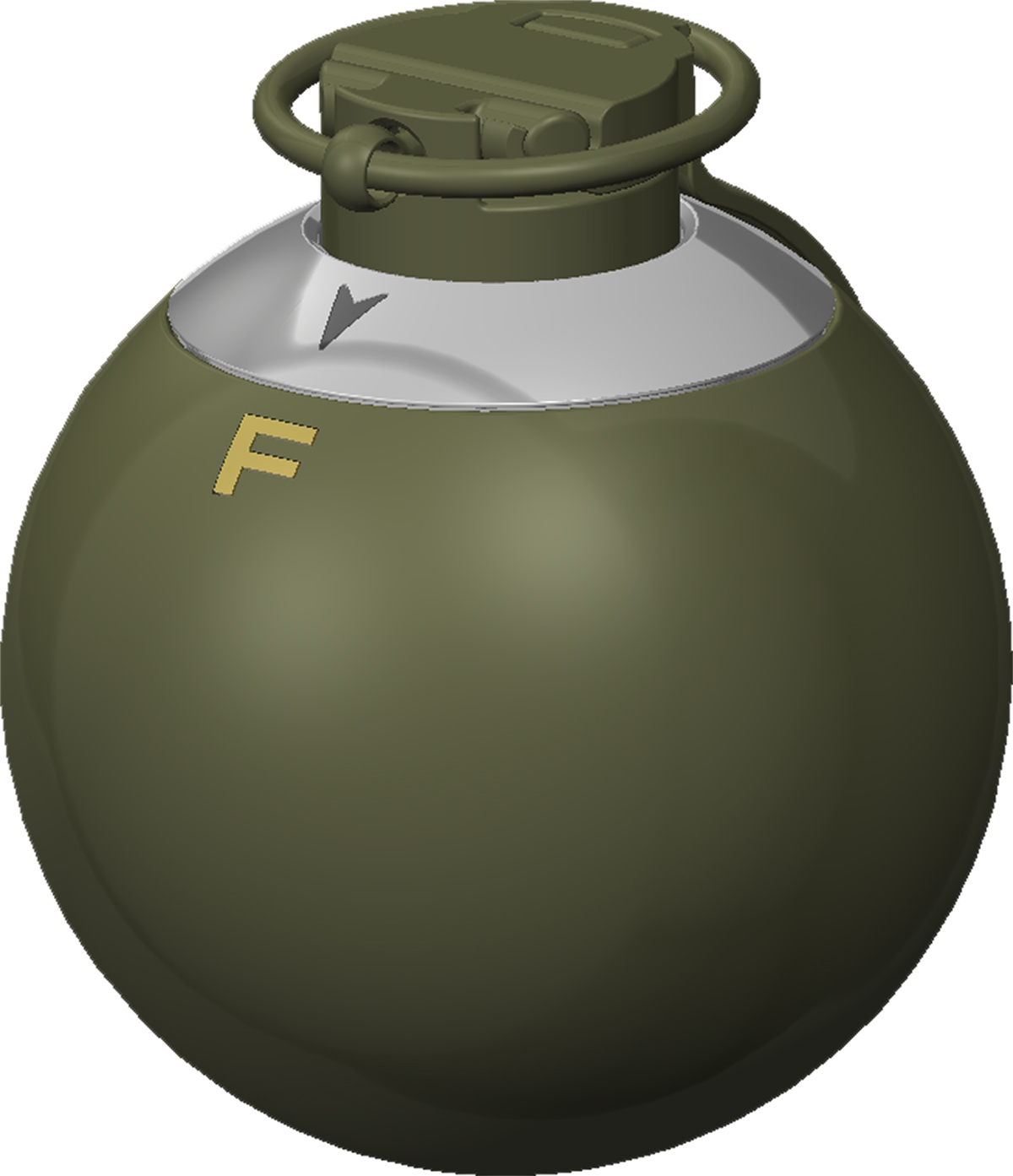
- The concept image of a ET-MP hand grenade
- Type: Hand grenade
- Place of origin: USA

The Enhanced Tactical Multi-Purpose (ET-MP) is an American hand grenade that was conceptualized and designed by engineers at the US Army Combat Capabilities Development Command Armaments Center (CCDC-AC) located at Picatinny Arsenal in New Jersey.

== History ==
Research for the ET-MP grenade began in 2010, with entry expected in 2020, however it has not been adopted.

== Design ==
The versatility of the ET-MP, offering two distinct operational modes, fragmentation and concussive, reflects its potential adaptability to various combat scenarios.

The distinguishing feature of the ET-MP is its electronic fuze system, allowing it to function in either fragmentation or blast mode, with the option to be selected at the time of use.

The fragmentation mode is likely designed to produce lethal shrapnel upon detonation, while the blast mode might prioritize a concussive effect, making it suitable for different tactical situations.

The ET-MP allows soldiers to choose between fragmentation and blast overpressure effects by flipping a switch.

It also has improved safety, being the first Insensitive Munitions-qualified lethal grenade in the Army's portfolio with an electronic fuse, or delay mechanism, instead of a mechanical fuse, that can be narrowed down into milliseconds and will not be able to detonate until armed.

The grenade is designed for ambidextrous use, whereas the M67 required a different procedure for left-handed use.

== Adoption ==
The grenade would fill the gap left by the withdrawal of the MK3A2 concussion grenade from service in 1975.

The MK3A2 was used to clear bunkers by detonating in confined spaces where blast pressure would reverberate off the walls. However, the exterior coating of the MK3A2 contained up to 50% asbestos, which can be hazardous to troops when inhaled.

The M67, introduced in 1968, was left as the only anti-personnel grenade in the inventory, until 2026 with the adoption of the M111 offensive hand grenade. The ET-MP has not been adopted.

== See also ==
- United States hand grenades
- Mk 2 grenade
- M26 grenade
- SFG 87
- Mecar M72
- Arges Type HG 84
- GLI-F4 grenade
- F1 grenade (Australia)
- Defensive grenade wz. 33
- M75 hand grenade
- Spränghandgranat 07
- Scalable Offensive Hand Grenade
