= Scalable Offensive Hand Grenade =

- Type: Hand grenade
- Place of origin: Norway; Finland

Service history
- Wars: Russo-Ukrainian War

Production history
- Manufacturer: Nammo

Specifications
- Mass: 230 g per module with fuze 190 g per module without fuze
- Length: Height with fuze 85 mm Module body diameter 53 mm
- Filling: Composition B (hexotol 60/40); PBXN-110
- Filling weight: 115 g per module (Comp B); 130 g per module (PBXN-110)

The Scalable Offensive Hand Grenade (SOHG) is a type of hand grenade created by Norwegian-Finnish firm Nammo.

== Design ==
The SOHG grenade is based on the HGO-115 non-modular offensive model hand-grenade.

SOHG grenades are "stackable", meaning up to three can be configured and connected to increase blast power to provide overpressuring effects, while using the same fuze.

The base grenade has a non-removable, 3.5 second fuse and a body encasing .25 pounds (110 g) of high explosive, so three connected grenades can have up to .75 lb (340 g) of blast force.

== Adoption ==
In 2010, US SOCOM began fielding SOHG grenades under the designation Mk 21 Mod 0. In 2024, the U.S. Marine Corps received deliveries of the Mk 21 Mod 0 SOHG for their frontline infantry units.

In 2026, Norway supplied Ukraine an unspecified amount of SOHG grenades with reports on a few units being captured by Russian forces.

== Users ==
- Russia
- Ukraine
- United States
  - United States Special Operations Command
  - United States Marine Corps

== See also ==
- Arges Type HG 84 – (Austria)
- Defensive grenade wz. 33 – (Poland, Second Polish Republic)
- DSS-161 – (China)
- Enhanced Tactical Multi-Purpose – (United States)
- F1 grenade (Australia) – (Australia)
- GLI-F4 grenade – (France)
- M26 grenade – (United States)
- M67 grenade – (United States)
- M75 hand grenade – (Yugoslavia)
- Mecar M72 – (Belgium)
- Mk 2 grenade – (United States)
- SFG 87 – (Singapore)
- Spränghandgranat 07 – (Sweden)
- United States hand grenades
