= LU 213 grenade =

LU 213
- Type: Hand grenade
- Place of origin: France

Service history
- Wars: War in Afghanistan

Production history
- Manufacturer: Titanite S.A. (Titanobel)

Specifications
- Mass: 280 g (9.9 oz)
- Height: 94 mm (3.7 in)
- Diameter: 52 mm (2.0 in)
- Filling: Composition B
- Filling weight: 90 g (3.2 oz)

The LU 213 is a French fragmentation hand grenade.

== History ==
Developed in the early 2000s by Titanite S.A. under contract for service with the French Army, the grenade first had its debut in Afghanistan in use by French soldiers.

In 2006 the manufacturing of the grenade by Titanite had ceased, with the responsibility of production being transferred to an unnamed subsidiary.

The production status of the grenade since 2006 is unclear, and it is unknown whether the grenades in service are from residual stock or newly manufactured.

== Description ==
The LU 213 has a squared ovoid body in molded plastic that contains 90 g (3.2 oz) of Composition B or other equivalent explosive. And with a 55 g (1.9 oz) fuze, the grenade has a total combined weight of 280 g (9.9 oz). With a fuze, it stands 94 mm (3.7 in) tall and 52 mm (2.0 in) wide.

The grenade has a delay time of 4 to 5 seconds. Upon detonation, it releases approximately 1,100 fragments and 230 steel balls, creating a lethal radius of about 9 metres (30 ft). The grenade is however not considered a danger to the thrower or anyone else standing at or beyond the safety radius of 22 metres (72 ft).

== Users ==
- France
  - French Armed Forces
    - Used as the DF Modèle F1 and F1A
- Sweden
  - Swedish Armed Forces
    - Used as the Spränghandgranat 2000

== See also ==
- Hand grenade
- HG 85
- Mk 2 grenade
- M67 grenade
- M26 grenade
- GLI-F4 grenade
- F1 grenade
- F1 grenade (Australia)
