= F1 grenade (France) =

Fusante nº 1
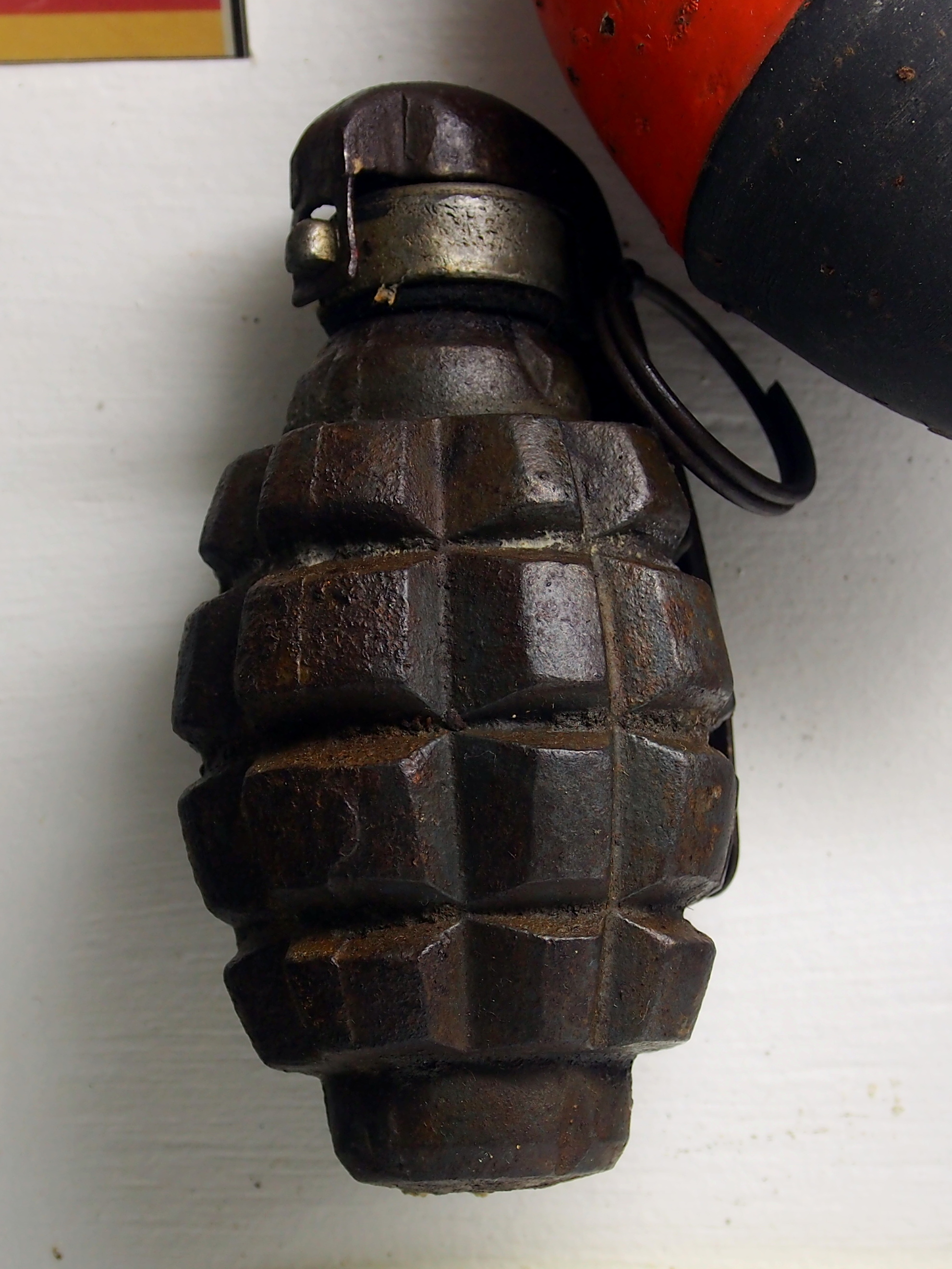
- A F1 fitted with a M1916B automatic plug igniter on display at the Somme 1916 Museum in Albert, Somme
- Type: Fragmentation hand grenade
- Place of origin: France

Service history
- In service: 1915–1940
- Used by: See § Users

Production history
- Designed: 1915
- Produced: 1915–1940 (France)
- No. built: Approx. 60,000,000
- Variants: See § Variants

Specifications (M1915)
- Mass: 630 g (22 oz)
- Length: 90 mm (3.5 in)
- Diameter: 55 mm (2.2 in)
- Filling: Cheddite, Schneiderite, or amatol
- Filling weight: 60 g (2.1 oz)
- Detonation mechanism: 5–7 second timer

The F1 grenade, officially designated as the Fusante nº 1 (lit. 'Fusing nº 1') or Grenade à main defensive F1 (lit. 'F1 defensive grenade', it was also popularly known as the le citron (lit. 'lemon') due to its shape, or ananas (lit. ' pineapple') and grenades quadrillées (lit. 'square-patterned grenades') after the segmented body, is a hand grenade that was mass-produced by France during and after the First World War.

While it was replaced in 1937 by the DF37 defensive hand grenade, it remained in use until the beginning of the Second World War. The F1 also influenced other nations grenade designs including Poland, United States and the Soviet Union.

== Design ==
This new weapon inherited from the experience of the first months of the war: the shape was made to be more modern, with an external grooves pattern for better grip and easier fragmentation.

The second expectation proved deceptive, since the explosion in practice gave no more than 10 fragments (although the pattern was designed to split into all the 38 drawn divisions).

Several types of fuses were used on the F1: The earliest grenades used a lighter-based ignition system known as the bouchon allumeur à mèche (lit. 'plug wick igniter') that was replaced by the M1915 percussion plug igniter (bouchon allumeur à percussion M1915) consisted of a percussion cap held in a small cardboard tube that was struck against a hard surface to ignite the delay fuse. The igniter was protected by a detachable, sealed cardboard tube 60 mm (2.4 in) long and 12 mm (0.47 in) in diameter; the M1915 was easily damaged and wasn't waterproof.

The improved M1916 percussion plug igniter (bouchon allumeur à percussion M1916) replaced the cardboard tubes with brass ones that were slightly shorter. While it was more resistant to moisture and less susceptible to damage, it still suffered from reliability problems and wasn't deemed as waterproof enough. Also in 1916, Monsieur Billant developed the M1916B automatic plug igniter (bouchon allumeur automatique M1916B), which used a spring mechanism to set off the percussion caps once the soldier pulled off the safety pin and released the lever. All fuses on the F1 detonated the explosive filler after a 5–7 second delay after being activated. After WW1, improved fillers were introduced improving fragmentation.

Initially Cheddite was used as explosive filler, but it was later replaced by Schneiderite, amatol, or xylitol pentanitrate. During WW1, their bodies were painted blue-grey while from early 1930s they were painted reddish-brown.

== Variants ==
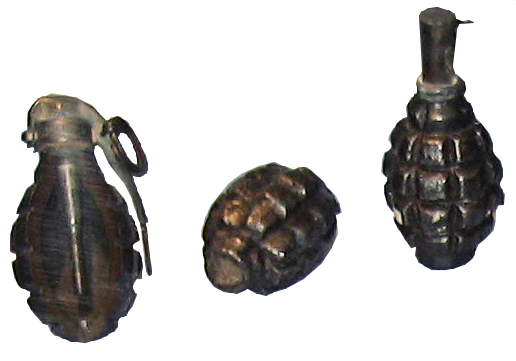
From left to right: F1 with M1916 Billant fuse, F1 body, F1 with percussion fuse.

- F 1915 – A fragmentation grenade with a segmented cast iron body, either fitted with the M1915 percussion or the M1916 Billant fuse at Army depots before they were distributed to troops
- Citron C F – A simplified variant of the F1, it could only be fitted with a metallic percussion fuse similar to the M1915

=== Related designs ===
The F1 served as model for other countries hand grenade designs:

- Defensive grenade wz. 33 – Second Polish Republic
- Mk 1 grenade – A 1917 US design, it used a higher-grade cast iron body that was more malleable and was filled with 57 g (2 oz) of TNT or a 50/50 mixture of amatol and nitrostarch resulting in a slightly more powerful explosion, but the fuse was expensive and too complicated for troops to use effectively
- Mk 2 grenade – An improved and simplified Mk 1, it was used by the US Armed Forces for nearly 50 years
- F1 grenade (Russia) – A Soviet copy of the F1, from which further variants were developed

== Adoption ==
The F-1 was very widespread during the first half of the 20th century, used by armies of France, United States, Imperial Russia, the Soviet Union, Finland, and others.

Overall more than sixty million of these grenades were produced over 25 years, from 1915 to 1940.

The F-1 grenade has been used as a basis for the development of many other grenades by different nations, among others in the Russian F1 Grenade and American Mk 2 grenade.

=== France ===
The F-1 grenade was first put into mass production by the French State in 1915 during the First World War.

In May 1915 the first of the F1 grenades (French: Fusante No. 1) appeared in the French military, in limited quantities.

The F-1 in its original design was withdrawn from French military service in 1946.

=== United States ===
The French F-1 grenade with the M1916 Billant fuse was the preferred grenade of the United States Army during World War I.

=== Russian Civil War ===
During the Russian Civil War, the F1 was both given to the White Movement forces by France and seized en masse by the Bolshevik regime, resulting in a very widespread use of the grenade. After the civil war, the Soviet artillery command decided to modify the French F-1 into the Russian F1 grenade design.

In Soviet folklore and colloquial speech, the grenade became a national icon of social upheaval and revolution, although not referred to as the F-1 but rather as "limonka" ([lı'mɒnkə]), 'little lemon', due to its very wide usage during the civil war and the chaotic period of the early 1920s.

The origins of the Russian limonka are ambiguous and remain a subject of historical debate, with one side presenting the case that the grenade was named after its shape and familiarity to the British No. 16 lemon grenade and another suggesting that the grenade was named after its French designer, Leman.

=== Vietnam War ===
The VIetcong/NVA modified F1 French grenade during Vietnam War

== Users ==
- Belgium
- Third French Republic
- Vichy France
- Finland − Used during the Winter War
- Nazi Germany − Captured
- Empire of Japan − Captured
- Commonwealth of the Philippines
- Poland
- Kingdom of Romania
- Russian Empire − Supplied to the White movement
- Spain
- Soviet Union
- United States − Used by the American Expeditionary Force
- North Vietnam

== See also ==
- Kugelhandgranate – (German Empire)
- Mills bomb – (United Kingdom of Great Britain and Ireland)
- Mk 2 grenade – (United States)
- M67 grenade – (United States)
- M26 grenade – (United States)
- SFG 87 – (Singapore)
- Arges Type HG 84 – (Austria)
- GLI-F4 grenade – (France)
- F1 grenade (Australia) – (Australia)
- Defensive grenade wz. 33 – (Poland, Second Polish Republic)
- M75 hand grenade – (Yugoslavia)
