= Spränghandgranat 07 =

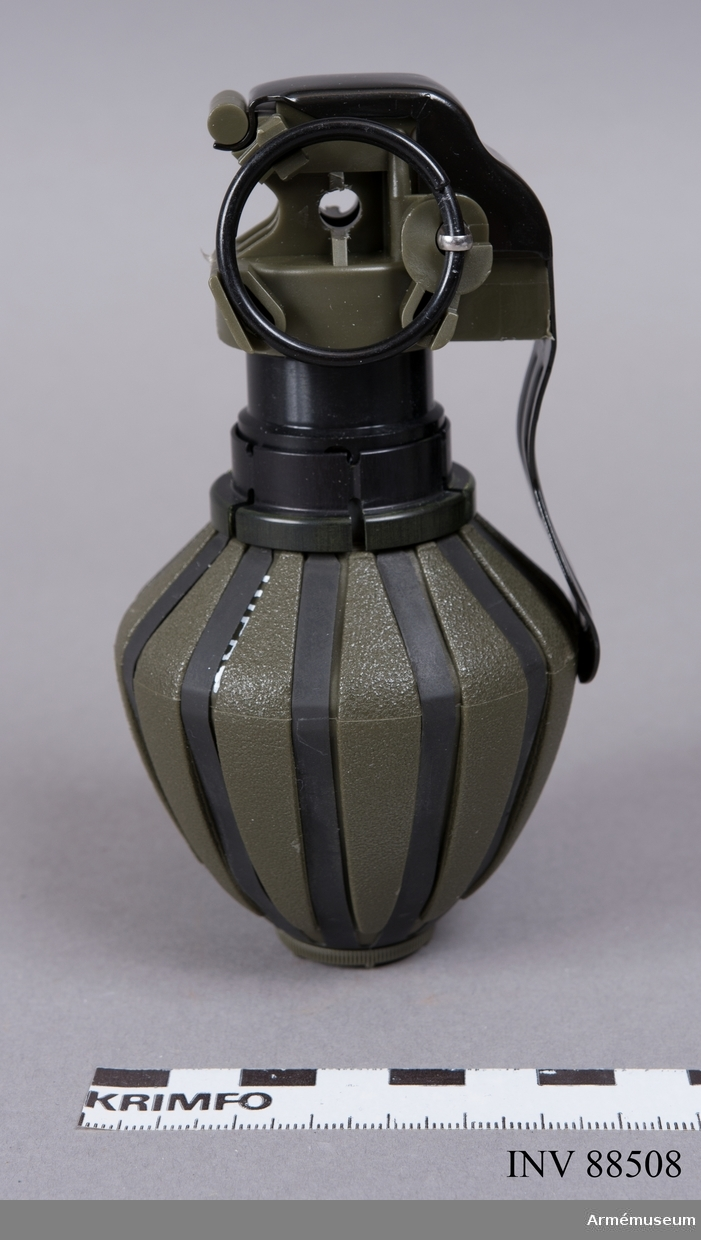
- Spränghandgranat 07 exhibition model
- Type: Hand grenade
- Place of origin: Sweden

Production history
- Designer: Försvarets materielverk
- Manufacturer: Rheinmetall Waffe Munitions ARGES GmbH

The Shgr 07 (Swedish: Spränghandgranat 07, lit. 'Blast hand grenade 07') is a Swedish self-righting jump hand grenade developed by Försvarets materielverk (FMV) under product-leader Ian Kinley, who also developed the improved fuze mechanism used in the shgr 07B.

== History ==
When Spränghandgranat 07 was introduced in 2012, Försvarets Materielverk called it "the greatest news in the field of hand grenades since the Great War".

Kinley was by Kungliga Krigsvetenskapsakademin awarded with both the Reward-medal in Silver of the 8th size and a monetary acknowledgement from the Albergska Stiftelsen.

== Design ==
The Spränghandgranat 07 grenades are manufactured at Rheinmetall Waffe Munitions ARGES GmbH in Austria on Försvarsmakten's behalf.

The Spränghandgranat 07 consists of a blast-body, in which the ignition mechanism with its safeties is screwed into the top and the propelling bottom plunger at the bottom, which also has the righting ribs enfolding the body upwards.

When the grenade lands after being thrown, the righting ribs will extend and raise the grenade perpendicular to the ground, after which the bottom plunger sends the grenade straight up to roughly two metres height, similar to the action of a bounding mine. There, it explodes and sends shrapnel downwards in a 136° arc, which covers a circle ten metres in diameter.

The Shgr 07 contains some 1900 balls that cover a cone 10 metres in diameter with the centre about 2 metres in height. This minimizes the dangers outside the lethal zone as there is little to no random scattering of fragments from the blast.

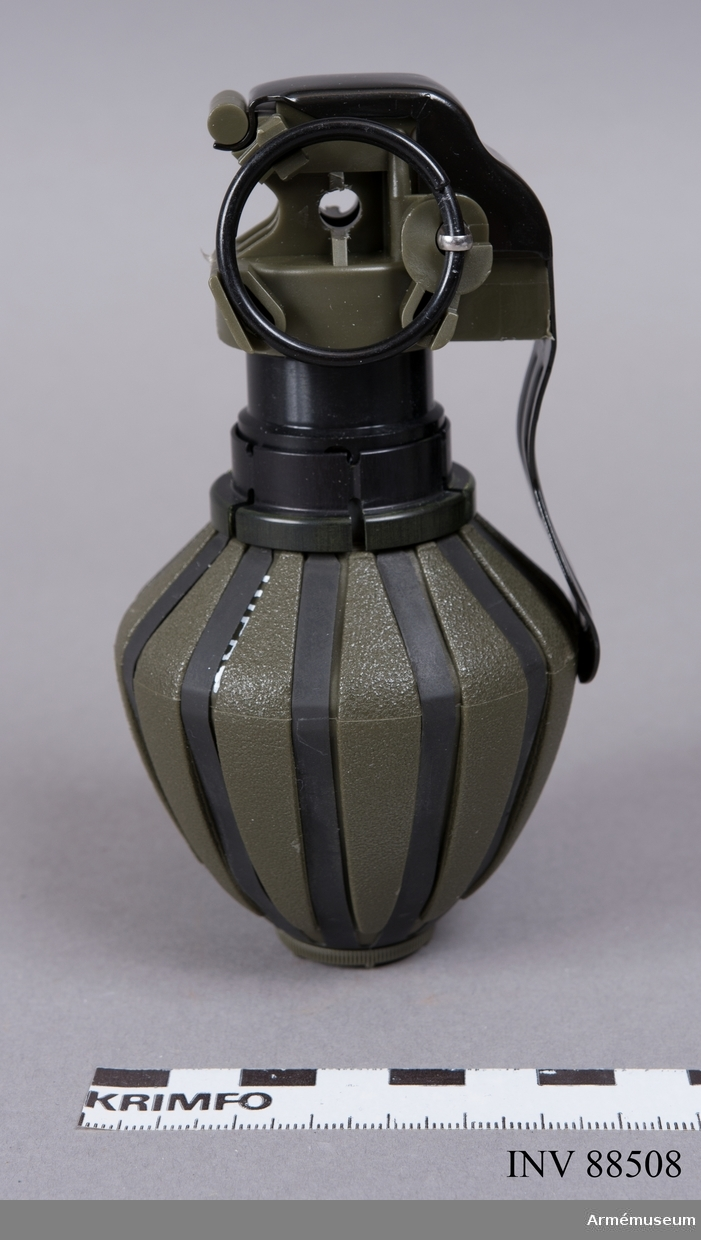
Spränghandgranat 07, inert exhibit model

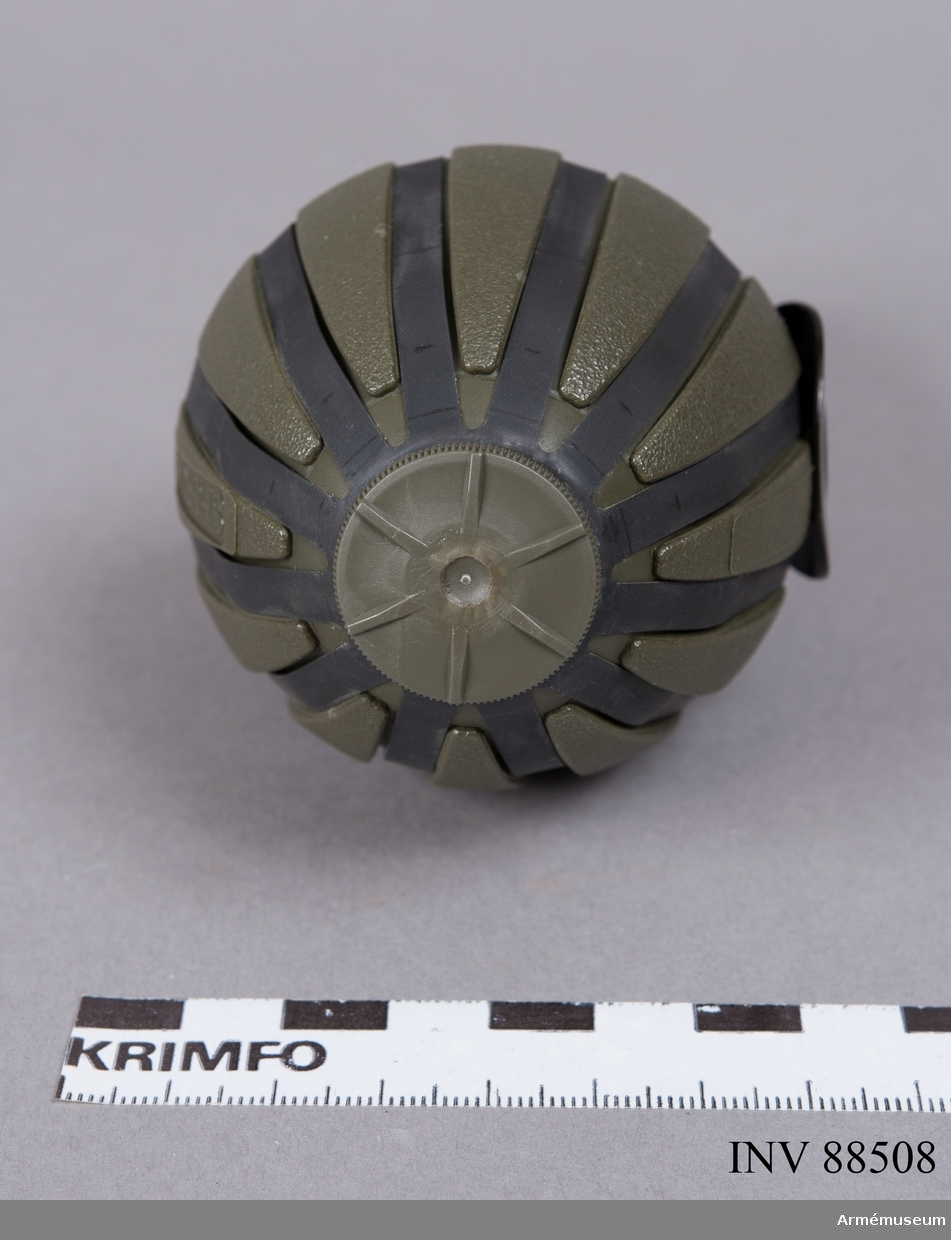
Bottom plug, the ribs in black.

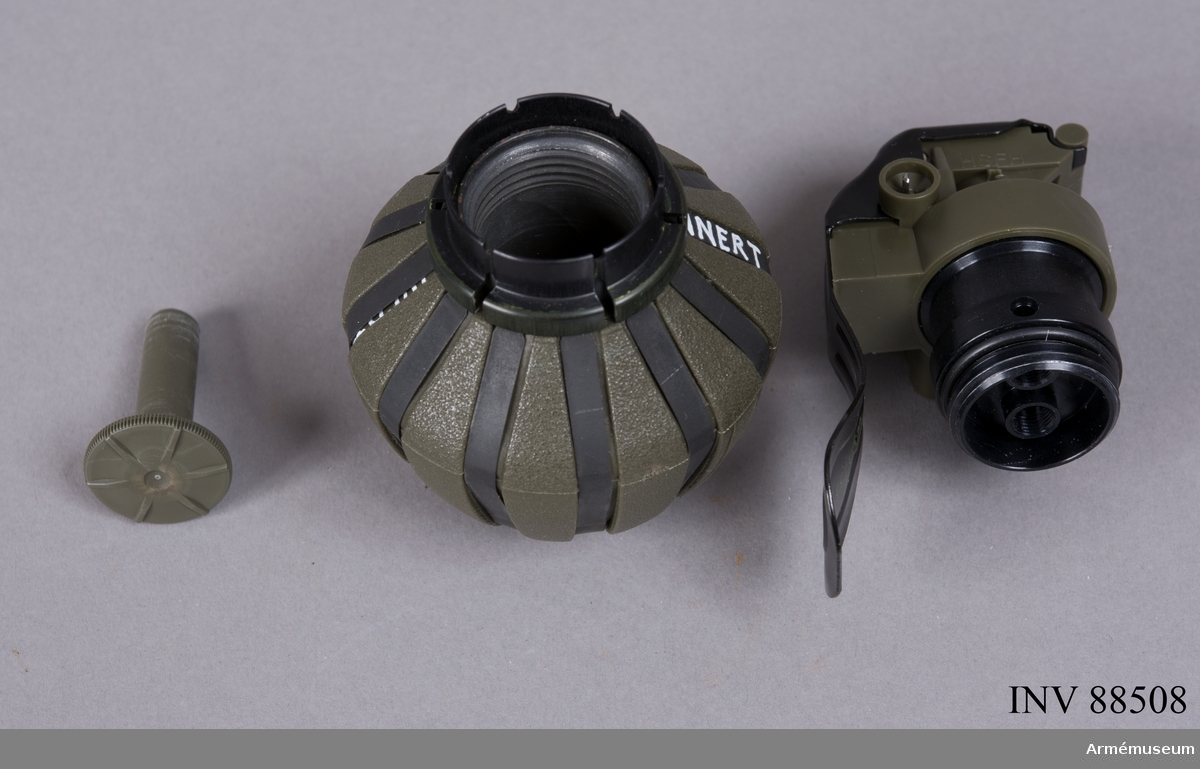
The three main components of shgr 07. Propelling bottom plug left, blast body centre and fuze mechanism to the right

== Variant ==
=== Shgr 07B ===
Shgr 07B, introduced in 2019, has a new ignition system, also developed by Ian Kinley at FMV.

Concerned with a number of serious incidents and accidents involving hand grenades, he identified the two main issues as the time-fuze's burntime varying with temperature (slower in cold and faster in heat) and the springs, the striker spring in particular, coming pre-tensioned from the factory by designs relatively unchanged since the 1930's.

In 2019, a new mechanism, fully interchangeable with the old ones, was adopted into service. The main difference, apart from a fully environmentally stable delay, is that the springs now are twist-tensioned by the thrower after the transport safety (pin and ring) has been removed, thus eliminating the possibility of unintentional arming of the hand grenade.

== Technical data ==
- Height: 130 mm.
- Diameter: 69 mm.
- Weight: 470 g.
- Delay: 4.0 seconds.
- Jump height: c:a 2 meter.
- Charge: Hexotol with 1900 pre-fragmentated splinters.

== Users ==
- Sweden

== See also ==
- Arges Type HG 84 – (Austria)
- Defensive grenade wz. 33 – (Poland, Second Polish Republic)
- F1 grenade (Australia) – (Australia)
- GLI-F4 grenade – (France)
- HG 85 – (Switzerland)
- M26 grenade – (United States)
- M67 grenade – (United States)
- M75 hand grenade – (Yugoslavia)
- Mecar M72 – (Belgium)
- Mk 2 grenade – (United States)
- SFG 87 – (Singapore)
- Stielhandgranate – (German Empire)

== Sources ==
FMV
Officerstidningen nr 7, 2019, sid 8
Succé för svensk handgranat, Aftonbladet 2013-09-05, Jan Huss
