= Mecar M72 =

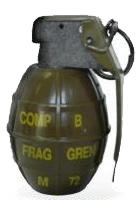
- Mecar M72
- Type: Hand grenade
- Place of origin: Belgium

Production history
- Designer: Poudreries Réunies de Belgique
- Manufacturer: Mecar

Specifications
- Mass: 230 g (8.1 oz)
- Effective firing range: 30 metres (98 ft) – 35 metres (115 ft)
- Filling: Composition B
- Filling weight: 60 g (2.1 oz)

The Mecar M72 is a fragmentation hand grenade designed by Belgian company Poudreries Réunies de Belgique (PRB), with Mecar taking over production after PRB closed.

== History ==
Made by Poudreries Réunies de Belgique, it was known both as the PRB 423 and the M72.

In the early 21st century, the US military considered the Mecar M72 as a replacement for the American M67 grenade, but decided to continue with the M67.

== Design ==
The M72 grenade has an egg shaped body fitted with an internal notched steel wire fragmentation coil. It weighs 230 g (8.1 oz) in total, with an explosive load of 60 g (2.1 oz) Composition B. Its fuze delays detonation 4 seconds after the spoon is released.

The inner tube explosion causes the main explosive load to detonate, which produces 900 shards of fragmentation, each weighing around 103 mg (1.59 gr). The top of the body around the fuse thread was filled with 33 0.1 g metal ball bearings and a further 22 are placed inside the bottom closing plug.

The grenade has a lethal radius of 9 m (30 ft), an injury radius of 20 m (66 ft), but beyond 20 m (66 ft) radius the risk of injury is minimal. An untrained soldier could normally throw the grenade 30 m (98 ft), making it safe to use as an offensive grenade, as well as a defensive grenade.

== Variants ==
=== M73 ===
Re-usable practice version. Body made with solid aluminium. The grenade body vented gases from a 13mm hole running from the fuse carrier thread to the bottom of the grenade. The M73 uses a four second delay fuse identical in all respects to the M72 fuse except the detonator has been replaced by a deflagrator, which produces noise and smoke.

A very similar drill practice grenade was made than had a 9 mm through hole. This would only mount the M73A1 Practice fuze (with no charge for drill purposes).

The deflagrator fuse is too large to fit the drill grenade, but either drill fuse or deflagrator fuse will fit the practice grenade.

=== PRB 446 ===
Offensive grenade with no fragmentation coil or ball bearings. However, it carried a greater explosive load (110 g (3.9 oz) grams of cast TNT).

The PRB was externally the same as the PRB 423 apart from the brown body colour and the different identification marks printed.

== Users ==
- Belgium
- Ireland

=== Failed Contracts ===
- United States

== See also ==
- Arges Type HG 84 – (Austria)
- Defensive grenade wz. 33 – (Poland, Second Polish Republic)
- F1 grenade (Australia) – (Australia)
- GLI-F4 grenade – (France)
- HG 85 – (Switzerland)
- M26 grenade – (United States)
- M67 grenade – (United States)
- M75 hand grenade – (Yugoslavia)
- Mk 2 grenade – (United States)
- SFG 87 – (Singapore)
- Spränghandgranat 07 – (Sweden)

== Bibliography ==
- Rottman, Gordon L. (2015). The Hand Grenade. Osprey Publishing. ISBN 978-1472807342.
