= Arges Type HG 84 =

Anti-personnel fragmentation hand grenade

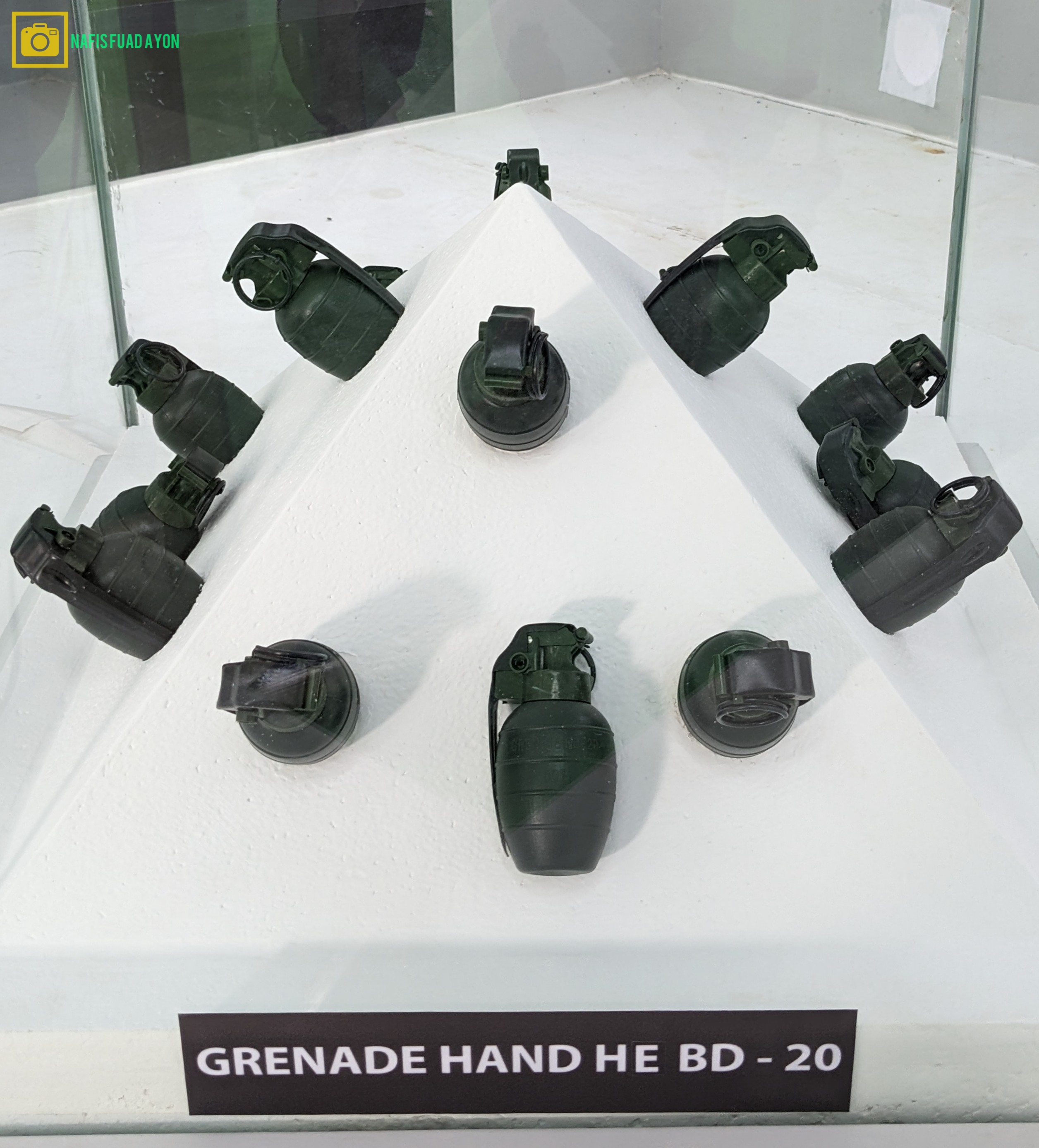
- Type HG 84-modified, Bangladeshi-made BD-20 grenades on display
- Type: Hand grenade
- Place of origin: Austria

The Arges Type HG 84 is a family of anti-personnel fragmentation hand grenade of Austrian origin.

== Production ==
The Arges Type 84 has been produced under license by Bangladesh Ordnance Factories as Arges 84 BD and Pakistan Ordnance Factories as Arges 84 P2A1.

== Users ==
- Bangladesh
- Pakistan

== See also ==
- United States hand grenades
- M67 grenade – (United States)
- BEANO T-13 grenade – (United States)
- Defensive grenade wz. 33 – (Poland, Second Polish Republic)
- F1 grenade (Australia) – (Australia)
- GLI-F4 grenade – (France)
- HG 85 – (Switzerland)
- M26 grenade – (United States)
- M75 hand grenade – (Yugoslavia)
- Mecar M72 – (Belgium)
- Mk 2 grenade – (United States)
- Scalable Offensive Hand Grenade – (Norway, Sweden)
- SFG 87 – (Singapore)
- Type 67 hand grenade – (China)
