= SFG 87 =

Singaporean Hand Grenade

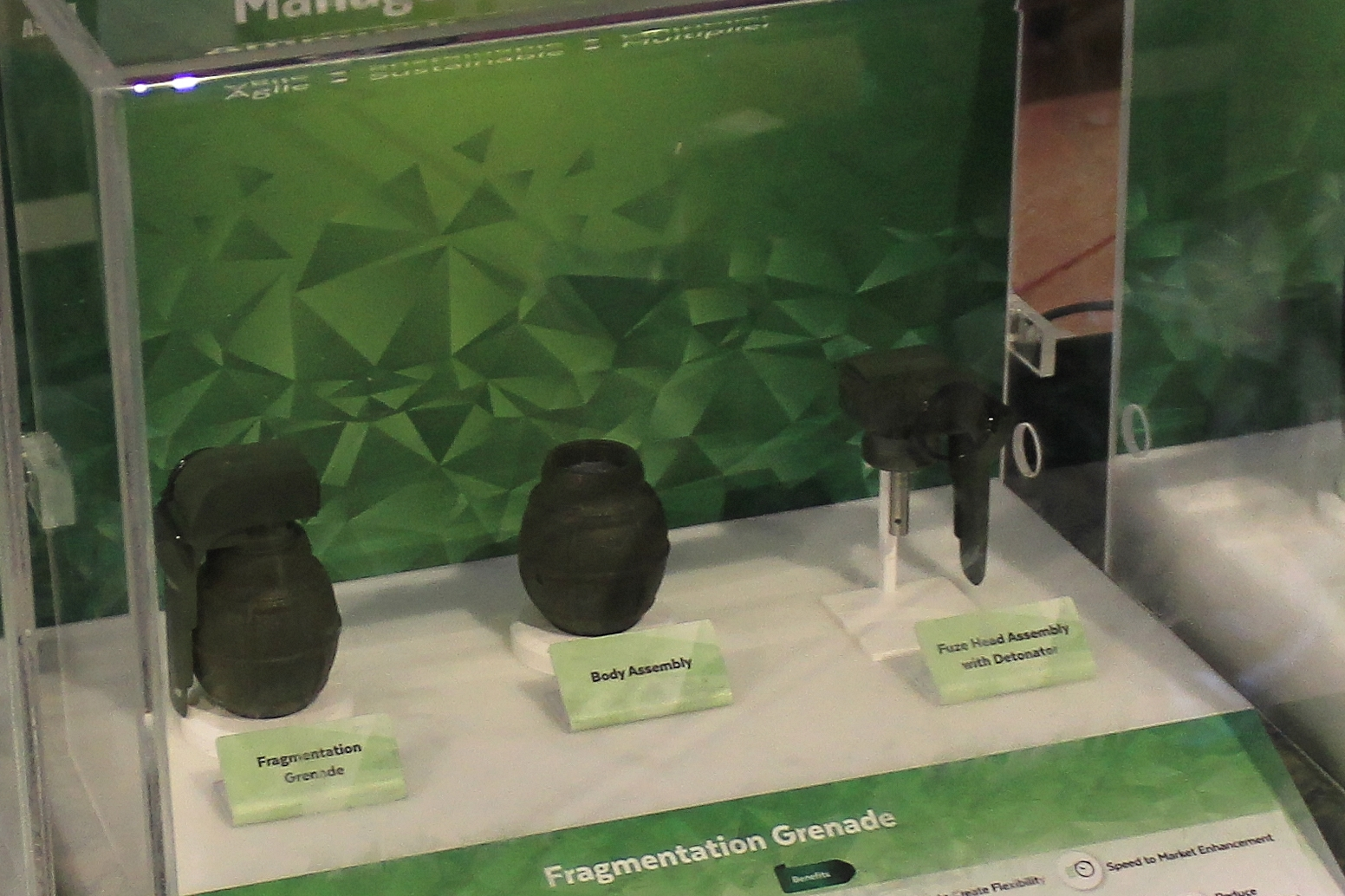
- SFG 87 grenades on display.
- Type: Hand Grenade
- Place of origin: Singapore

Service history
- In service: 1987 - present

Production history
- Designer: Chartered Industries of Singapore
- Manufacturer: ST Kinetics
- Variants: SFG 75, SFG 82, Anti-Frogman AFG

Specifications
- Mass: 300 g
- Length: 96 mm
- Diameter: 54 mm
- Filling: Composition B
- Filling weight: 150 g
- Detonation mechanism: Striker Release

The SFG 87 (lit. 'Singapore Fragmentation Grenade 87') is a defensive fragmentation hand grenade created in Singapore.

== History ==
The SFG 87 has been mass-produced since 1987 by Singaporean weapons manufacturer ST Kinetics replacing the older SFG 82 and SFG 75 variants.

== Design ==
The SFG 87 has a military green plastic pre-fragmented body with 700 steel balls, each one having a diameter of 2 mm, ingrained into the inner shell. The shell has distinct ribbing across the outer surface to improve a person's grip on it. The grenade has an overall length of 110 mm and a diameter of 54 mm.

The grenade contains approximately 150 grams of Composition B, which is ignited by pulling the safety pin, thus igniting the primer with the use of a Percussion Mechanism when the grenade is thrown, and the lever is released. Once ignited, the fuse lasts 4.5 seconds before exploding.

The grenade has a significantly smaller diameter than other grenades its length, such as the M67 grenade and the DM51 grenade. It was a deliberate design decision by Chartered Industries in order to give the smaller statured soldiers an easier time of usage.

The grenade is able to withstand temperatures from -20 °C to +50 °C before being at risk of structural damage or premature explosion. The SFG 87 has reusable practice and drill variants, such as the SPG 93, commonly used to train military personnel, with the safety marker painted blue for easy identification. On detonation, the SFG 87 has a maximum kill radius of 5 m, and a casualty radius of 20 m. It has a safety radius of 25 m.

== Variants ==
=== SFG 75 ===
A predecessor of the SFG 82 and copy of the M33 Grenade. Unlike the SFG 82 and SFG 87, this grenade features no ribs.

The grenade has a length of 93 mm and a diameter of 57. It has an olive green cast-steel body with yellow markers. The SFG 75 has a casualty radius of 10 m and a safety radius of 15 m.

=== SFG 82 ===
A predecessor of the SFG 87. The grenade has a length 105 mm and a diameter of 54 mm. It has the same amount of explosive filler as the SFG 87 at 300 g, and also contains 80 grams of Composition B. It has a similar appearance to the SFG 87, having an olive green plastic body. It has a casualty radius of 10 m and a safety radius of 15 m.

=== Anti-Frogman AFG ===
A larger variant of the standard SFG 87 designed for and used against frogmen and infantry in underwater conditions. The AFG (Anti-Frogman Grenade) contains more explosive filler as the regular grenade, with around 180 g of Composition B.

The AFG features a pyrotechnic fuse which allows the grenade to detonate between depths of 3 m to 8 m. The AFG has a much larger length of 138 mm and a diameter of 54 mm. It has a casualty radius of 10 m, and a safety radius of around 30 m.

== Incidents ==
=== Inside Singapore ===
On 8 March 2013, 2 Singapore Armed Forces full-time NSFs, Safety Officer 2nd Lieutenant Kamalasivam S/O Shanmuganathan, and Recruit Abdul Hamid Bin Abdul Smad were injured during a live hand grenade training exercise, after the recruit accidentally released the lever of a SFG 87 while pulling out the safety pin. Kamalasivam quickly instructed Abdul Hamid to throw the grenade towards the impact zone. The grenade detonated shortly in midair after being thrown.

The recruit sustained an injury to his finger, while the officer suffered an injury on his shoulder. Both the recruit and officer were treated on site, then were taken to Changi General Hospital in stable condition.

=== Outside Singapore ===
==== Assassination of Rajiv Gandhi ====
On 21 May 1991, former Prime Minister of India Rajiv Gandhi was assassinated in a suicide bombing by Kalaivani Rajaratnam. She had placed a garland over Gandhi and bend over to touch his feet. She then detonated an RDX explosive-laden belt tucked below her dress. Gandhi, Rajaratnam and 14 others were killed in the explosion that followed.

During the investigation, Special Investigation Team Explosives Expert Major Manik Sab-harwal indicated that the pellets from the grenades from the belt were identical to that of the SFG 87.

== Users ==
- Singapore: Used by Singapore Armed Forces full-time servicemen, National Service Men and reservists as an anti-personnel grenade.

== See also ==
- Arges Type HG 84 – (Austria)
- F1 grenade (Australia) – (Australia)
- GLI-F4 grenade – (France)
- HG 85 – (Switzerland)
- M26 grenade – (United States)
- M67 grenade – (United States)
- M75 hand grenade – (Yugoslavia)
- Mk 2 grenade – (United States)
- Spränghandgranat 07 – (Sweden)
