= HG 85 =

HG 85 fragmentation grenade
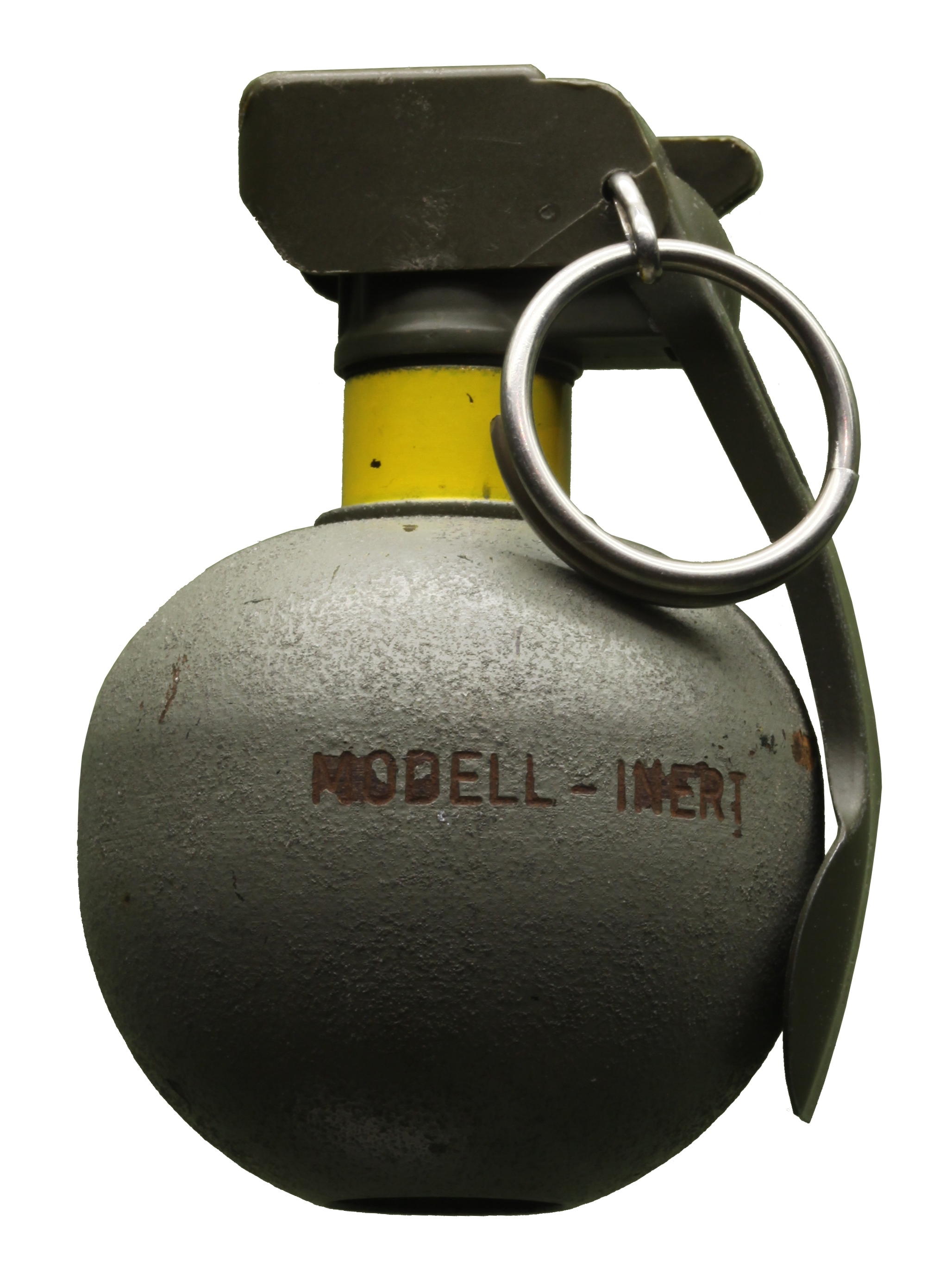
- Type: Hand grenade
- Place of origin: Switzerland

Production history
- Designer: Munitionsfabrik Altdorf, today RUAG
- Designed: 1985
- Produced: 1985–present

Specifications
- Mass: 465 g (16.4 oz)
- Length: 97 mm (3.8 in)
- Diameter: 65 mm (2.6 in)
- Filling: RDX / TNT (55/45%)
- Filling weight: 155 g (5.5 oz)
- Detonation mechanism: Time Fuse

The HG 85 (German: Hand Granate M1985, French: Grenade à main 85, Italian: Granata a mano 85) is a round fragmentation hand grenade designed for the Swiss Armed Forces, and is produced by RUAG Ammotec in Switzerland.

== History ==
The HG 85 is the internal designation of the Swiss Army and replaced the HG 43 from World War II. It entered service in the Swiss Army in 1985.

In September 2000, a six-year contract with Swiss Ammunition Enterprise Corporation (a RUAG subsidiary) was announced, committing the UK to purchase around 363,000 grenades for combat and live training, first deliveries scheduled for March 2001.

== Design ==
The design of the grenade was made by the federal Munitionsfabrik Altdorf (MF+A) which became SM Schweizerische Munitionsfabrik and later RUAG Ammotech.

The initial detonator was supplied by Diehl (Germany) and later on manufactured under licence in Switzerland. The explosive was supplied from Germany.

The grenade is spherical with a bushing on the top threaded internally to accept the DM 82 CH fuze mechanism. Due to its specially constructed fuze and packaging, the grenade is considered very secure. On detonation, the steel body containing 155 g (5.5 oz) of TNT releases around 1,800 fragments, weighing on average 0.1 g (0.0035 oz).

A supplementary spring steel safety clip is clipped over the safety lever and bushing on top of the grenade preventing the safety lever from moving.

=== Operation ===
==== Live version ====
Once the HG 85's safety pin is pulled the grenade is armed, but so long as the fly-off lever is kept depressed while the grenade is held (and the grenade can be held indefinitely with the pin out) it can be safely returned to storage so long as the fly-off safety lever is still in the closed position and the safety pin reinserted. If thrown – or the lever allowed to rise – the protective plastic cover falls away and the striker, under pressure of the striker spring, begins to rotate on its axis. This causes the safety lever to be thrown clear, the striker continues to rotate until it hits the percussion cap, which fires and ignites the delay pellet.

The heat of the burning delay pellet melts solder holding a retaining ring, allowing the detonator to move under the influence of a spring from the safe to armed position. The delay pellet continues to burn and after between 3 and 4 seconds burns out and produces a flash that forces aside a flap valve allowing ignition. When the flash reaches the detonator this initiates a booster charge which in turn initiates the main explosive filling.

==== Training versions ====
The fuze mechanism in the L110A1, under the plastic cover is very similar in appearance to the American fuze mechanisms. Internally there is an extension on the striker to allow it to be re-cocked during training and there is a leaf spring safety that clips around the safety lever and neck of the grenade preventing the lever from rotating even if the safety pin is pulled.

Consisting of two parts, a grey reusable striker mechanism and an L162 practice fuse (which has a blue body with a brown base and is fitted with a silver washer) the L111A1's practice fuse is fitted into the bottom of the reusable striker mechanism then the entire assembly is screwed into the top of the grenade. In this version the safety lever is attached by a plastic strap to prevent loss, the entire unit, apart from the expended L162 practice fuse, being reused.

== Effect ==
The HG 85 is primarily intended for use during fighting in built-up areas, trench clearing, and wood clearing.

UK grenade range safety data suggests the L109 and, by extension, all live versions, may represent a danger at ranges up to 200 m (220 yd).

The HG 85 is designed to be effective against opponents wearing body armor, up to 20 layers of Kevlar and 1.6 mm (0.063 in) of titanium. It is effective against unprotected personnel up to 10 m (33 ft) away, and protected personnel up to 5 m (16 ft).

== Variants ==
=== Swiss-produced ===
==== EUHG 85 ====
Designated as the "explosive training hand grenade" (German: Explosiv-Übungshandgranate 85 or EUHG 85, French: Grenade à main d’exercice explosive 85 or Gren main ex exp 85), the EUHG 85 has nearly the same size TNT charge (120–155 g (4.2–5.5 oz)), function in the same way as the HG 85. but with no shrapnel mantle.

The HG 85 and EUHG 85 are of the same size, shape and weight, made up by adding iron powder, as the HG 85, and painted a coarse black. The grenade housing, especially the fuze block, also causes some fragmentation.

EUHG 85s are stamped "EXPLOSIV" and due to substantial explosive charges, EUHG 85s are dangerous.

==== Mark HG 85 ====
The Mark HG 85 (German: Markier-Handgranate 85, French: Grenade à main de marquage 85 or gren main 85 marq) is used for initial training in the Swiss Army. It is equal in size and shape to the HG 85, but contains no explosive charge. However, a small bang charge can be inserted by unscrewing the upper part (where the fuze and lever are).

Releasing the lever ("spoon") activates a striker that fires the charge to produce a bang. This is used for training purposes especially when there is OpFor to simulate an explosion but not endanger anyone.

The Mark HG 85 can be recovered and reloaded with another banger.

==== Manip HG 85 ====
The Manip HG (for manipulation, German: Wurfkörper-Handgranate 85 or WurfK HG 85, French: Corps de lancement grenade à main 85 or Lanc gren main 85) is used for learning the basic movements and practicing throwing hand grenades in the Swiss Army. It is the same size and shape as a real HG 85, but with no moving parts. It is produced as a solid polymer block and painted bright orange, for easy recovery in the field.

==== OHG92 ====
Offensive grenade, painted black with a yellow band around the neck. OHG92s were produced for export only.

The OHG92 solely relies on its explosive power, and doesn't have a steel fragmentation liner. For this reason, it has no armour piercing capability.

=== Foreign orders ===
==== L109A1 ====
The L109 is the British designation for the HG 85. It differs from the HG 85 in that it has a special safety clip (matte black in color, which is similar to the safety clip on the American M67 grenade.

The L109 is deep bronze green in color with golden yellow stenciling, and a rough exterior comparable to light sandpaper, and a yellow band around the top bushing, and weighs 465 g (16.4 oz).

Markings give the designation "GREN HAND HE L109A1", a manufacturer marking "SM" meaning "Swiss Munitions", and a lot number. Markings on the safety lever give the designation and lot number of the fuze.

==== L110A1 ====
The L110 Drill Grenade is an entirely inert (with no explosive content) version of the L109.

Identical in size, weight and shape, as the live grenade and is used for training purposes, specifically correct handling and throwing. It can be easily distinguished from the live grenade as it is dark blue with white markings

The body is solid aluminum with a textured plastic coating made in the same form as the live grenade, the textured coating ensuring a good gripping surface. A hole drilled up from the bottom indicates an empty store as well as ensuring the drill grenade is of the same weight as a live grenade. A bushing on top of the grenade has a dummy fuze mechanism permanently attached with a slot for the pull ring to clip into to prevent it being accidentally pulled.

The markings are 'GREN HAND INERT DRILL L110A1' and a manufacturers marking "SM" meaning Swiss Munitions. The fuze mechanism is marked on the wide bottom portion of the lever "HG2 DM 82 CH".

==== L111A1 ====
This L111 Practice Grenade has a small simulation charge (flash/bang) that imitates a live grenade for training purposes. It is distinguishable from the wholly inert L110 by being a much lighter blue and is fitted with a distinctive gold/orange plastic cap and safety lever.

The body of the L111A1 is made of steel, is covered in a textured plastic material and has the word 'PRACTICE' embossed near the top of the body, near a top portion which is larger than the bushing on the live grenade. Like the L110 there is a large aperture in the bottom of the grenade which demonstrates it is not a live grenade, but in the L111A this aperture allow gas from the practice fuse to escape.

Markings, again in white, include 'GREN HAND PRAC L111A1', a manufacturers mark 'SM' meaning Swiss Munitions, and a lot number.

==== Nr300 ====
The Nr300 is the Dutch designation for the HG 85. It is exactly like the L109. There is also the Nr330.

== Users ==
- Malaysia: HG85 HE variant
- Netherlands: Nr300 and Nr330 variants.
- Switzerland: Swiss Armed Forces with 1,500,000 EUHG grenades ordered in 1985 and 100,000 WurfK HG 85 grenades ordered in 1985.
- United Kingdom: Used as "GREN HAND HE L109A1", "GREN HAND INERT DRILL L110A1" and "GREN HAND PRAC L111A1".
- United Arab Emirates: 225,162 grenades sent to the UAE in 2003

=== Non-state users ===
- ISIS

== See also ==
- Arges Type HG 84 – (Austria)
- Defensive grenade wz. 33 – (Poland, Second Polish Republic)
- F1 grenade (Australia) – (Australia)
- GLI-F4 grenade – (France)
- M26 grenade – (United States)
- M67 grenade – (United States)
- M75 hand grenade – (Yugoslavia)
- Mk 2 grenade – (United States)
- SFG 87 – (Singapore)
