= United States hand grenades =

The military of the United States has used many different types of hand grenades since its foundation.

== High explosive, fragmentation, and blast ==
=== Mk I ===
The Mk 1 grenade was introduced in 1917 during World War I. A multistep arming process on the device resulted in many failures, and as a result it was replaced in 1918 by the Mk II.

=== Mk II and Mk IIA1 ===
More commonly known as the Pineapple, the Mk II series (also written Mk 2) was the most commonly used US fragmentation grenade of the Second World War. The Mk II had a grooved exterior originally intended to aid fragmentation of the grenade. However, later studies showed that this design has no effect on fragmentation, though it does provide a non-slip surface that improves grip. The filling was either EC blank fire powder (approximately . 0.75 oz or 21 g smokeless small arms powder) or flaked TNT (approx. 2 oz or 57 g). TNT became the common filler from 1942 onwards.

The Mk II was also available in a little-known HE-Blast variant (better known as the concussion), and a combined effect HE-Frag variant. This was largely superseded by the Mk III series. The Mk IIA1 (also written Mk 2A1) used the M10A2 or M10A3 fuses, upgrades to the previous M10A1 fuse used in the Mk II. Later reissued Mk II variants featured the modern M204 series fuse.

=== Mk III, Mk IIIA1, and Mk IIIA2 ===
Unlike the Mk II, the Mk III (also written Mk 3) was a cylindrical grenade designed to be used as an offensive weapon for clearing rooms, trenches, and other enclosed spaces. A concussion grenade, the Mk III series, was designed to incapacitate through the pressure and impulse produced by the explosion. The MkIII had a far larger TNT filling than the Mk II series, up to 8 oz (230 g) of TNT, in comparison to1.8 oz (51 g). Although a minimum-fragmentation grenade, large fragments (most likely the fuse assembly or surrounding material) could be projected as far as 200 m (660 ft) from the detonation point. The differences between the Mk III, the Mk IIIA1 (also written Mk 3A1), and the Mk IIIA2 (also written Mk 3A2) were improved versions of the M6 fuse: the Mk III featured the M6/A1, the Mk IIIA1 the M6A2, and the Mk IIIA2, the M6A3. Later reissued Mk III variants featured the modern M206 series fuse.

=== M26/A1/A2, M57 and M61 ===
The M26 series is in many ways an upgrade to the basic principle of the Mk II: a similarly shaped, but not visibly ribbed, fragmentation grenade. The M26 has a filling of Composition B contained within a sheet steel two-part outer shell that covers a pre-notched fragmentation coil inner liner. The use of the inner liner creates a highly predictable fragment pattern and casualty radius. The grenade was found to have problems with incomplete detonation of the filler, and the M26A1 featured a tetryl booster to ensure complete detonation. The M61 grenade was the product of a further Product Improvement Program (PIP), and is identical to the M26A1 with the exception of the additional safety clip for the spoon of the grenade on the M61. The M26A2 is identical to the M26A1, except for being fitted with the M217 impact fuse. The M57 is the equivalent of the M61 for the M26A1, and is the same as the M26A2 with the exception of the additional safety clip on the spoon of the grenade.

=== M33, M33A1/M59, M67, and M68 ===
Similar in format to the M26, the M33 is a spherical fragmentation grenade also filled with Composition B explosive. Unlike the M26, the inner wall is prescored and does not contain a fragmentation coil. The grenade has a smooth surface, unlike the Mk II series "pineapple" casing. The M67 was part of a similar PIP and is identical to the M33, with the exception of the additional safety clip for the spoon of the grenade on the M67. Early M33 grenades were also more of an oval shape before transitioning over to the more spherical shape of the M67. The M67 is the current issue HE-Frag grenade for the US military. The M33A1 is the impact version of the M33, using the M217 electrical impact fuse in place of the normal delay fuze. At an unknown time the M33A1 was redesignated as the M59. There should be no difference between these grenades except that the M33A1 may be more ovular in shape than the more spherical M59. The M68 is the same as the M59, with the exception of the additional safety clip.

=== Mk 21 Mod 0 Scalable Offensive Hand Grenade ===
In 2010, US SOCOM began fielding the Mk 21 Mod 0 Scalable Offensive Hand Grenade that delivers blast effects. The grenades are "stackable," meaning up to three can be connected to increase blast power.

The base grenade has a non-removable, 3.5 second fuse and a body encasing .25 pounds (110 g) of high explosive, so three connected grenades can have up to .75 lb (340 g) of blast force.

=== ET-MP ===
Picatinny Arsenal is developing the Enhanced Tactical Multi-Purpose (ET-MP) hand grenade to combine fragmentation and concussive effects in a single weapon. The grenade fills the gap left by the withdrawal of the MK3A2 concussion grenade from service in 1975. The MK3A2 was used to clear bunkers by detonating in confined spaces where blast pressure would reverberate off the walls. However, the exterior coating of the MK3A2 contained up to 50% asbestos, which can be hazardous to troops when inhaled. The M67, introduced in 1968, was left as the only anti-personnel grenade in the inventory. The ET-MP allows soldiers to choose between fragmentation and blast overpressure effects by flipping a switch. It also has improved safety, being the first Insensitive Munitions-qualified lethal grenade in the Army's portfolio with an electronic fuse, or delay mechanism, instead of a mechanical fuse, that can be narrowed down into milliseconds and will not be able to detonate until armed. The grenade is designed for ambidextrous use, whereas the M67 required a different procedure for left-handed use. Research for the ET-MP grenade began in 2010, with entry expected in 2020, however it has not been adopted.

=== M111 ===
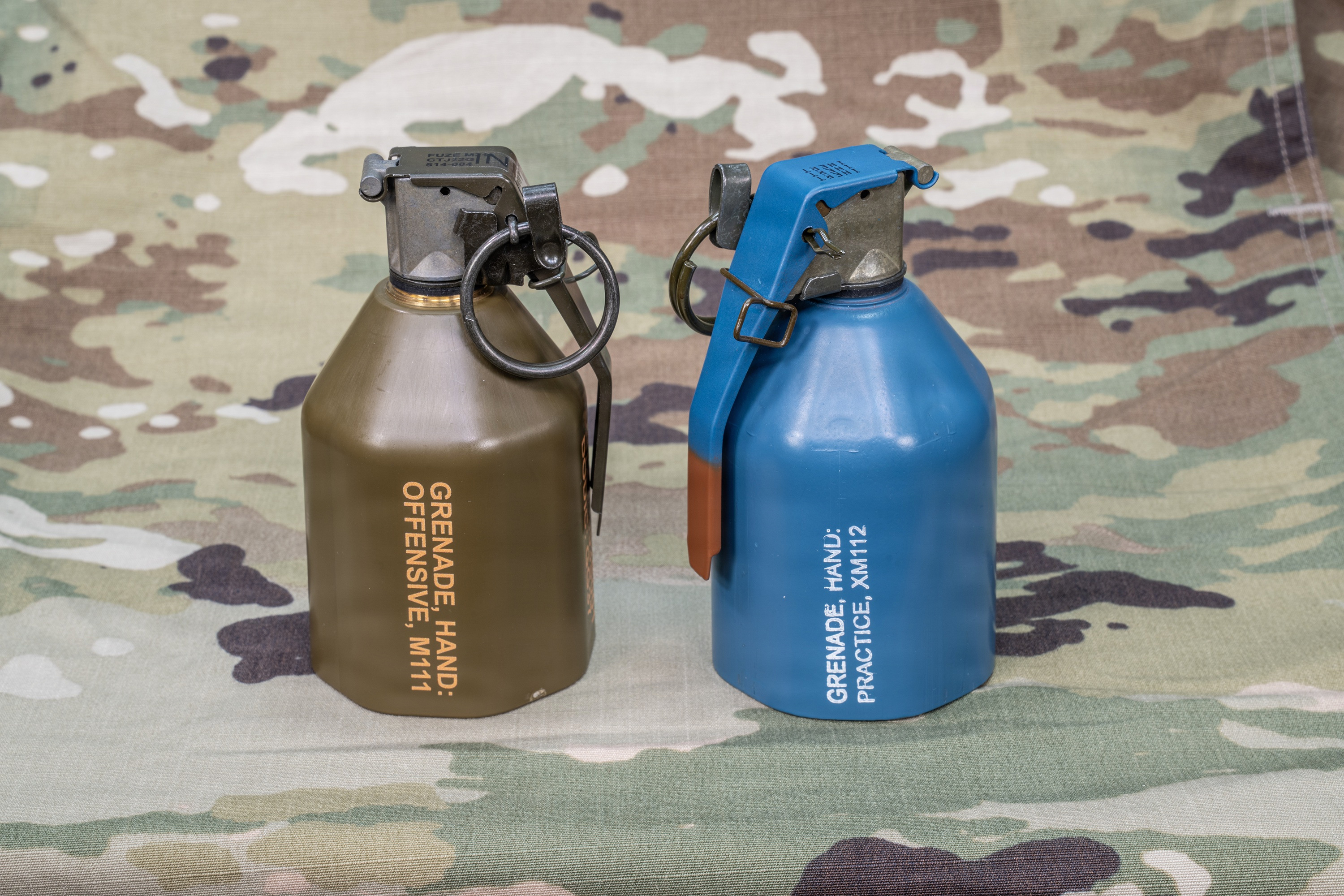
M111 Offensive Hand Grenade and practice version

In 2021 the US Army adopted the M111 Offensive Hand Grenade for blast overpressure and concussion effects in enclosed areas. The M111 will replace the Mk3A2 (Mk IIIA2).

== Smoke and signaling grenades ==
=== M1 Frangible Grenade (FS) ===
In September 1942, the United States standardized a Molotov cocktail-style device that was nominally designated as a "grenade". It consisted of a pint-sized clear glass bottle with a crimped metal cap. It was dubbed "frangible" because it was made of glass, which is brittle and easily broken.

Most fillers were liquid compounds selected because they were activated by exposure to the air, thus not requiring a detonator. FS was a mixture of sulfur trioxide and chlorosulfuric acid that created a heavy, acrid screening smoke.

The M1 Frangible Grenade (FS) was declared limited standard by 1944.

=== M8, M83 and Model 308-1 White Smoke ===
A smoke grenade similar visually to the Mk III HE-Blast grenade, the M8 (also written AN/M8) is filled with hexachloroethane (HC), a chemical agent that produces a thick white smoke when burned. The M8 is used for signaling and screening purposes, and since it works by burning the HC for its effect, it can also be used as an improvised incendiary device. HC smoke is toxic and can cause more serious health problems with prolonged exposure. The M83 (also written AN/M83) is a modernized version of the M8, using TA (Terephthalic Acid) instead of HC as the filler mixture. The Model 308-1 White Smoke was a modified version of the M8 produced at the Special Operations Branch of the Naval Weapons Center at China Lake California, often simply referred to as China Lake. The Model 308-1 was modified for a US Navy SEAL requirement with a greater burning rate, meaning a greater smoke output but a shorter overall burning time.

=== M15, M16, and M34 ===
The M15 is a white phosphorus smoke grenade, nicknamed Willie Peter or Willie Pete (for white phosphorus), used for screening and signaling purposes. It is cylindrical, but with rounded edges compared to those of the M8. WP has many of the same properties as HC and is also burned to create the effect, giving the M15 a similar incendiary capability. The M16 was a colored version of the grenade that was originally available in red, orange, yellow, green, blue, violet, and black smoke versions. This was later simplified to red, yellow, green, and violet. The M34 grenade was a variant of the M15 designed to be usable as a rifle grenade using the M2 series of grenade launching adapters, and was ribbed to give the fins better grip on the grenade body.

=== M18 ===
Designated standard issue on 24 September 1943. A purpose-designed smoke flare, the M18 was a smoke grenade visually similar to the M8, but with a different type of filler and internal construction. The M18 has been the primary colored smoke grenade of the United States Armed Forces since its introduction, being used extensively. The M18 is produced with four colors of smoke: green, yellow, red, and violet. A non-submersible variant of the M18 with a flotation bladder was made in 1971, for use in marking at sea. This version of the M18 did not see usage outside of testing however. It was produced by Northrup Carolina, a subsidiary of Northrup Grumman at the time.

=== XM48/E1/E2/E3 ===
A variant of the XM47 series, which is in the following section, the XM48 is a skittering-type smoke grenade: the filler is burned internally and vented through ports in the grenade body, making the grenade spin erratically. The XM48 series burns an unknown filler for a red-colored smoke, probably WP or HC based, and is not known to be standardized.

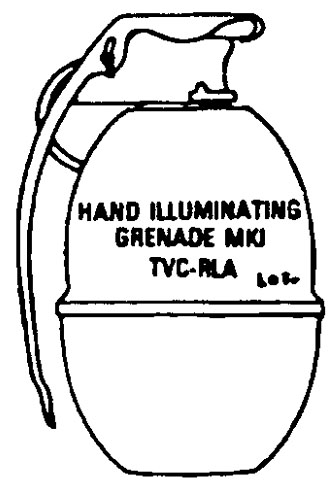
Drawing of the Mk 1 Illumination Grenade

=== Mk 1 Mod 0/1/2/3 ===
An illumination grenade, with a magnesium filler ignited by a wick type fuze, the Mk 1 Mod 0 was first produced during the Second World War. The Mod 1 probably featured an improved type fuze, moving away from the simple wick lighter design. The Mod 2 featured a simplified overall design, while the Mod 3 replaced the single-piece steel body with a two-piece plastic shell.

=== EX 1 Mod 0 and EX 2 Mod 0 ===
Developed as a joint project between the US Navy and the DuPont Chemical company, the EX 1 and EX 2 were part of the Target Illumination and Recovery Aid (TIARA) program. DuPont created a number of essentially glow-in-the-dark fillers, finally settling on the non-toxic PB-155 compound. PB-155 (also known as TIARA 5) glows when it oxidizes and therefore could be used to mark things at night with minimal fuss. Developed specifically for the US Navy SEALs, the first production models were created in 1963. The EX 1 Mod 0 was a hand grenade, based on the M25A2 chemical grenade described in the following section. Testing in 1963 showed that the TIARA 5 mixture had averse effects on the functioning of the C12 fuze integral to the M25A2 design. This led to the replacement of the fuze's integral primer, the M39A1, with a model that was resistant to the filler mixture, the M5. The EX 2 Mod 0, visibly more similar to other cylindrical smoke and chemical grenades (such as the AN/M8 and M18 discussed in this section) was designed to be used as a rifle grenade using the M2 series of grenade launcher adapters.

The US Army also tested a plastic chemiluminescent grenade in 1966, utilizing the PB-155 filler and the M217 impact fuze, with negative results about the mixture's usefulness for the intended role, with the brightness and duration of functioning being "insufficient".

== Chemical grenades ==
=== M1 Frangible Grenade (AC, CNS and M1) ===
In September 1942 the United States standardized a Molotov cocktail-style device that was nominally designated as a "grenade". It consisted of a pint-sized clear glass bottle with a crimped metal cap. It was dubbed "frangible" because it was made of glass, which is brittle and easily broken.

The M1 grenade could be filled with any of a number of chemical compounds depending upon the effect required, in both lethal and non-lethal combinations. Most fillers were liquid compounds selected because they were activated by exposure to the air, thus not requiring a detonator. AC filler (Hydrocyanic Acid) was a blood agent. CNS (Chloracetophenone solution) was a tear gas made from CN gas (Chloracetophenone) dissolved in Chlorpicrin and Chloroform. M1 (B Chlorvinyldichlorarsine, or "Lewisite") was a liquid that turned into a powerful vesicant gas upon exposure that chemically burned the surfaces of exposed skin and lungs.

=== M6/A1, M7/A1/A2/A3 and M54 ===
The M6/M7 series were cylindrical riot control grenades, with a variety of fillers, including CN, CS, and DM. DM is a substance that causes a burning sensation in nose and throat and a heavy tight feeling in the chest, accompanied by a nauseating effect. All of these weapons are burning type grenades that work by burning the filler and emitting the resulting smoke through holes in the body. The M6/A1 is filled with CN-DM, the M7/A1 with CN, the M7A2 (also written ABC-M7A2) with CS, and the M7A3 (also written ABC-M7A3) with the CS in pelletized rather than gelatin capsule form. The M7A2 and M7A3 have 3 emission holes on top and one on the bottom, the M6 and M7 have 6 emission holes on top and 1 on the bottom, and the M6A1 and M7A1 have 4 emission holes on the top and one on the bottom. The M54 is a variant of the M7 series designed to be dropped for aerial launchers.

=== M25/A1/A2 ===
A spherical riot control grenade, the M25/A1 (also written ABC-M25/A1) is filled with CN. The grenade is of plastic construction and is a bursting type. The M25A2 featured improved body construction, and later models were filled with CS (and possibly DM) rather than CN.

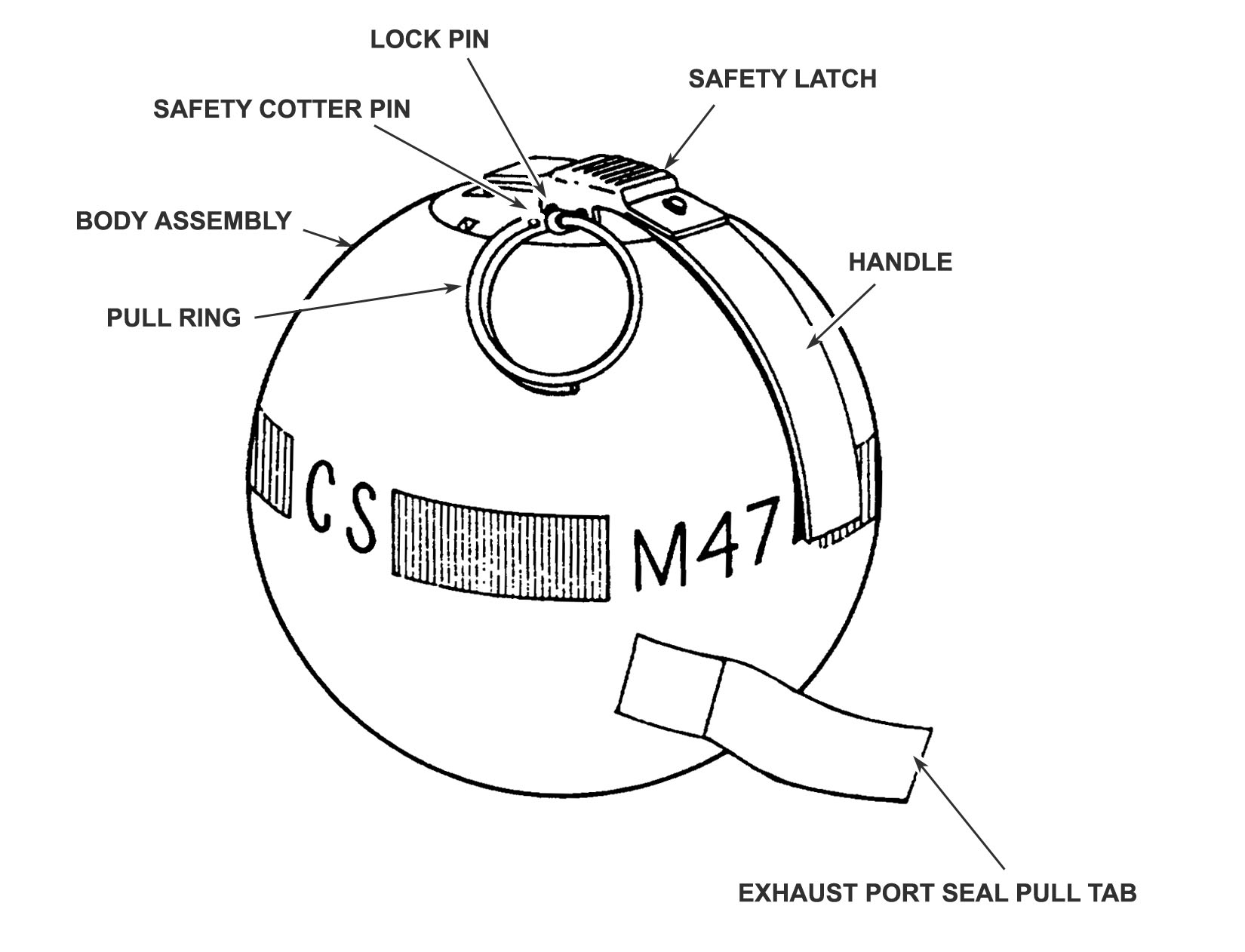
Drawing of the M47 Riot Control Grenade.

=== XM47/E1/E2/E3 ===
A rubber ball riot control grenade, the XM47 series are known as skittering grenades, as the gas is burned internally and vented through ports in the grenade body, in effect making the grenade spin erratically. This is designed to make it harder for the target or targets to retrieve and throw back the grenade. The XM47E3 is filled with CS, but information on the other variants is scarce. It is probably safe to assume that at least one is filled with CN, and then others might have the filler in different solid forms. The XM47E3 was standardized as the M47.

=== XM58 ===
A small cylindrical "pocket" grenade, the XM58 is a riot control weapon filled with CS.

== Incendiary grenades ==
=== M1 Frangible Grenade (AW, Alcohol-Gasoline, GA, IM, and NP) ===
In September 1942 the United States standardized a Molotov cocktail-style device that was nominally designated as a "grenade." It consisted of a pint-sized clear glass bottle with a crimped metal cap. It was dubbed "frangible" because it was made of glass which is brittle and easily broken. The most common types of fillers for the M1 were, not surprisingly, a number of incendiary agents. The various fillers changed as the chemical technology improved and created a number of more standardized Molotov cocktails.

AW was an incendiary mixture of Phosphorus with Rubber dissolved in Gasoline. The phosphorus ignited when exposed to the air, setting off the gasoline - it also burned on its own but could not be put out with water. The dissolved rubber allowed the gasoline to adhere to surfaces while burning. It was made obsolete in 1943.

The Alcohol-Gasoline model was exactly what it said on the tin: a mixture of grain alcohol and gasoline. It used an M1 fuze, which released a chemical powder that would ignite the mixture. The GA filler was liquid or solidified ("jellied") gasoline. It was ignited with an M2 fuze, which used a safer and more reliable time-delay pull-fuze.

Models with IM filler (Gasoline mixed with an incendiary thickener) or NP filler (a mixture of gasoline and Naphtha Palmate) were fuzed with an M3 Igniter fuze attached to the bottle with a Timmerman strap safety. The M3 Igniter fuze assembly consisted of a fuze body, a striker, and a .38-caliber Blank cartridge. The Timmerman Strap was a metal band under tension around the surface of the grenade that was hooked up to a striker safety in the fuse body. (If the bottle broke prematurely, the Timmerman strap safety would prevent the striker from going off on impact.) To activate the grenade, the user pulled the safety pin from the fuse assembly. He then threw the bottle against the target hard enough to shatter the glass. When the bottle broke, the Timmerman strap fell off, deactivating the strap safety and allowing the striker to engage. The fuze spring in the fuze body activated the striker, which struck the cartridge. The blank cartridge set off a pyrotechnic flash, which ignited the thickened gasoline filler.

=== M14 TH3 ===
A cylindrical grenade visually identical to the M8, the M14 (also written AN/M14) is a purpose designed incendiary grenade. Working off the intense and violent reaction of the thermate filler, the result of the deployment of the M14 is molten iron. This means the M14 is primarily employed on material to be destroyed in a roughly secure environment and not as an offensive or defensive weapon. The grenade has the ability to melt right through an engine block. Also, since the thermite reaction uses iron oxide instead of oxygen for its oxidizing agent, the grenade can work under water.

=== Model 308-1 Napalm ===
Another variant of the Model 308-1 designed by the Special Operations Branch of the Naval Weapons Center at China Lake, California, the 308-1 Napalm was in direct response to SEAL requirements for a more offensive incendiary device over the M14. Issued as a kit, the user would take the included powdered Napalm ("M1 Thickener") and then fill the grenade with gasoline to produce a complete incendiary device.

== Stun grenades ==
=== M116/A1 and the "Flash-Crash" ===
The M116/A1 is not technically a stun grenade, but is in fact a hand grenade simulator, designed to create a realistic but not dangerous grenade-like effect for exercises. The M116 series is usually fitted with a pull string igniter and fuze assembly. An improvised stun grenade was created from the M116 series by US Navy SEALs, by replacing this fuze with an M201 series igniting fuze. This new weapon was nicknamed the "Flash-Crash". There are certain dangers from using the M116-based Flash-Crash however, mainly the metal body, from which potentially dangerous fragments may break when employing the device in hostage rescue situations.

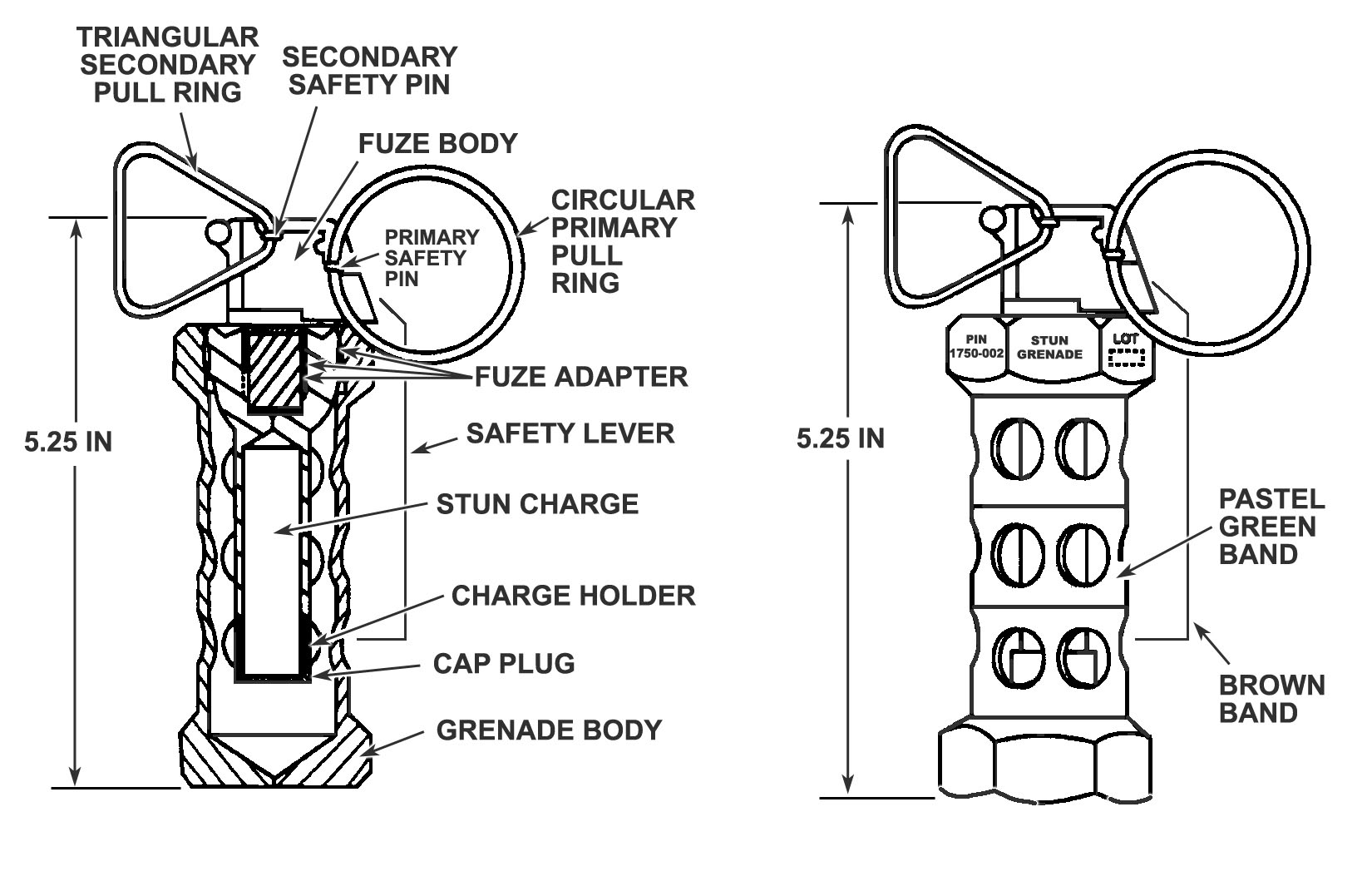
Drawing of the M84 Stun Grenade.

=== XM84/M84 ===
A diversionary stun grenade developed by the US Army, the M84 is part of a number of less-lethal and generally less harmful crowd control and disorientation weapons currently under development by the US military for use in riot control, hostage rescue, and similar situations. The M84, like most stun grenades, creates a loud bang and a blinding flash (such grenades are often called "Flash-Bang"), and is readily identifiable by its two hexagonal end-caps on a perforated tube. A small charge is detonated in the center of this tube for the desired effect.

=== Mk 141 Mod 0 ===
A diversionary stun grenade developed by the US Navy, the Mk 141 is a product of the same thinking that gave rise to the M84 and is designed to be used in similar situations. Looking much more like a conventional grenade, the Mk 141 is constructed of a lightweight solid foam.

== Training grenades ==
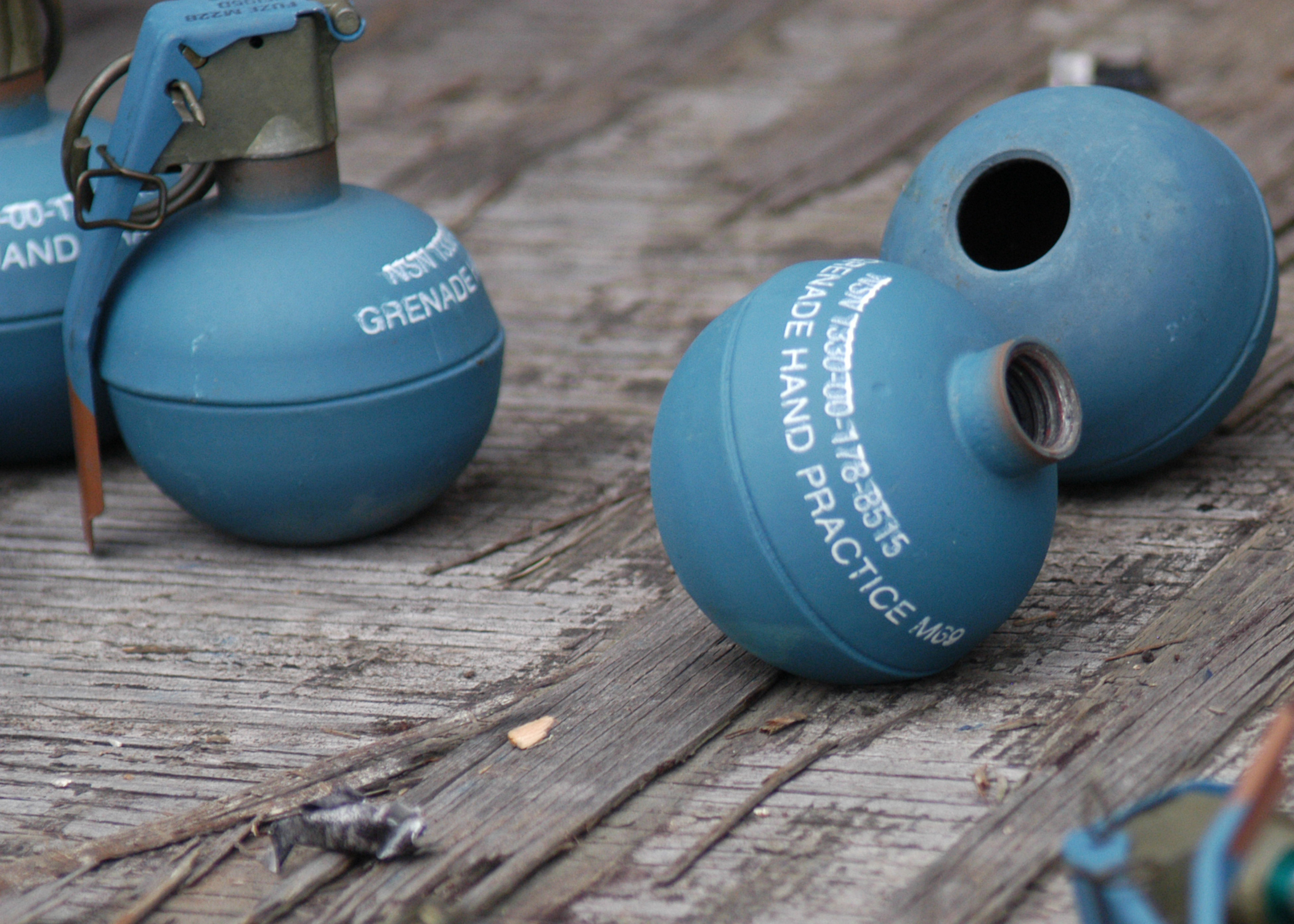
Ready and used M69 Training Grenades, the training version of the M67.

The following is a table of training grenades, and what grenades they are designed to mimic

| Training grenade | Associated live grenade |
|---|---|
| Mk II Practice | Mk II |
| M21 | Mk II |
| M69 | M67 |
| M83 | Practice grenade for bursting type smoke and gas grenades, based on previously issued M83s |
| XM102/M102 | XM84/M84 |
| XM112 | M111 |

== Common fuzes ==
The following table is of common grenade fuzes

| Designation | Associated Grenades | Description |
|---|---|---|
| M1 Igniter | M1 Frangible Alcohol-Gasoline | An igniter containing a chemical powder which ignites on contact with the filler. |
| M2 Igniter | M1 Frangible GA | Similar to the M1, but with a pull wire fuze lighter, which allowed for a delay ability and more consistent detonation of the filler. |
| M3 Igniter | M1 Frangible IM/NP | An improved igniter using a fuze assembly with a .38 caliber blank, all set into motion by a true striker, attached by means of a Timmerman strap. |
| M10/A1/A2/A3 | Mk II Series | A mouse trap type igniting fuze; ignition ignites filler |
| M5 | Mk II (Frag-HE) | A mouse trap type detonating fuze, detonation sets off filler |
| M6/A1/A2/A3/A4 | Mk II (HE-Blast), Mk III Series, M15, M34 | A mouse trap type detonating fuze; the A1–A3 are improvements in the fuze function, the A4 features a safety clip. |
| M204/A1/A2 | Mk II series, M26/A1, M61 | A mouse trap type detonating fuze, 4–5 second delay, detonation sets off filler |
| M206/A1/A2 | Mk IIIA3, M15, M34 | A mouse trap type detonating fuze, 4–5 second delay, detonation sets off filler |
| M213 | M67 | A mouse trap type detonating fuze, 4–5 second delay, detonation sets off filler, safety clip |
| M217 | M26A2, M33A1, M57, M59, M68 | A mouse trap type electrical impact fuze, 1 second delay, detonation sets off filler |
| M228 | M69 | Training fuze with functional fuze to train on the 4–5 second delay |
| C12 | M25/A1/A2 | Integral detonating fuze, 1.4–3 second delay, detonator bursts body scattering agent |
| M200/A1 | M6/A1, M7, M8, M14, M16, M18 | A mouse trap type igniting fuze. Ignition ignites the filler and expels it from the grenade body. |
| M201/A1 | M8, M83, M14, M18 | A mouse trap type igniting fuze, 1.2–2 second delay. Ignition ignites the filler and expels it from the grenade body. |
| M201A1 MOD 2 | M7A1/A2/A3, M84 | Variant of the M201A1, designed to be non-fragmenting |
| M201A1-1 | Misc Grenades | Training variant of the M201A1 |

== See also ==
- List of individual weapons of the U.S. armed forces
- List of land vehicles of the U.S. armed forces
