= M67 grenade =

American hand grenade

M67
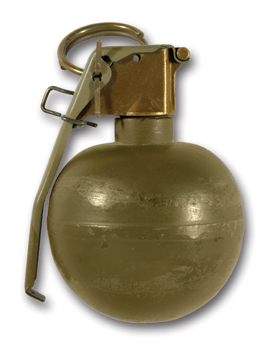
- M67 fragmentation grenade
- Type: Hand grenade
- Place of origin: United States

Service history
- In service: 1968–present
- Wars: Vietnam War; Falklands War; Operation Urgent Fury; Operation Just Cause; Persian Gulf War; War in Afghanistan; Iraq War; Operation Inherent Resolve; Russo-Ukrainian War

Production history
- Designed: Late 1950s
- Manufacturer: Day & Zimmermann
- Unit cost: $45 (avg. cost in 2021)
- Produced: 1968–present

Specifications
- Mass: 14 oz (400 g)
- Length: 3.53 in (90 mm)
- Diameter: 2.5 in (64 mm)
- Filling: Composition B
- Filling weight: 6.5 oz (180 g)
- Detonation mechanism: Pyrotechnic delay M213 fuze (4–5.5 seconds)

M69
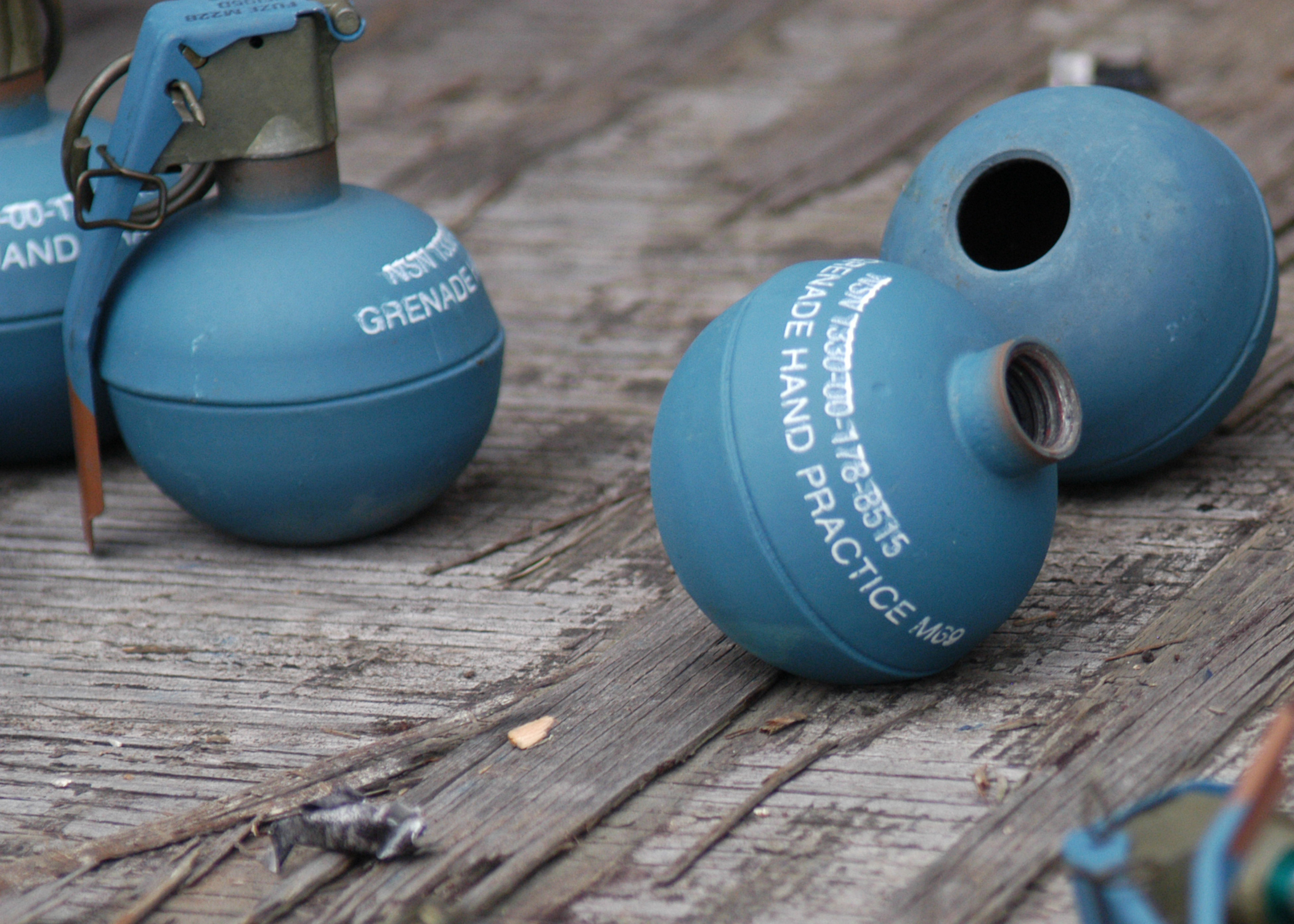
- M69 training grenades
- Type: Hand grenade
- Place of origin: United States

Service history
- In service: Current

Specifications
- Mass: 14 oz (400 g)
- Length: 3.53 in (90 mm)
- Diameter: 2.5 in (64 mm)
- Filling: None
- Detonation mechanism: Pyrotechnic delay fuze – 4 seconds

The M67 grenade is a fragmentation hand grenade used by the United States military. The M67 is a further development of the M33 grenade, itself a replacement for the M26 grenade used during the Korean and Vietnam Wars, and the older Mk 2 "pineapple" grenade used since World War I.

== History ==
The M67 was used in the Vietnam War for booby traps.

== Design ==
The M67 grenade has a spheroidal steel body that contains 6.5 oz (180 g) of composition B explosive. It uses the M213 pyrotechnic delay fuze.

The M67 grenade weighs 14 oz (400 g) in total and has a safety clip to prevent the spoon on the grenade from being triggered in the event the safety pin is accidentally pulled. The safety pin prevents the safety lever, or "spoon" on the grenade from moving and releasing the spring-loaded striker which initiates the grenade's fuze assembly.

The M67 is typically known as a "baseball" grenade because it is shaped like a ball that can be easily thrown. According to the FY2021 US Army Justification, the average cost of a single M67 grenade is around 45 US dollars.

The M67 can be thrown 35 meters (115 ft) from the standing position by the average male soldier. Its fuze delays detonation between 4 and 5 seconds after the spoon is released. Steel fragments are formed by the grenade body fracturing and have an injury radius of 15 meters (49 ft) and a fatality radius of 5 meters (16 ft), though some fragments can travel as far as 230 meters (750 ft).

== Variants ==
=== M33 fragmentation grenade ===
The M33 was the original successor to the M26 fragmentation grenade. It was essentially identical to the M67, but lacked the safety clip that is fitted to the safety lever of the M67.

=== M68 fragmentation grenade ===
This is a variant of the M67 fitted with the M217 impact fuze and a safety clip on the safety lever. This fuze has an electrical impact function which arms within 1 to 2 seconds and will detonate the grenade upon impact, and a back-up pyrotechnic delay function which will initiate the grenade after 3 to 7 seconds if the impact function fails. The M68 has the same specifications and markings as the M67 except it has a red-painted fuze and lever to indicate it has an impact fuze.

=== M33A1 and M59 fragmentation grenades ===
Predecessors to the M68, these impact-fuzed grenades used the M33 grenade body fitted with the M217 impact fuze, without a safety clip on the safety lever, and are marked similarly to the M68.

=== M69 practice grenade ===
The M69 grenade is used for grenade training to safely simulate the M67 grenade. The fuze screws into the body, and is replaceable after use. The simulator produces a report and a small puff of white smoke when employed.

A U.S. Marine with Weapons Company, Battalion Landing Team 1st Battalion, 5th Marine Regiment, 11th Marine Expeditionary Unit, throws an M67 fragmentation grenade during sustainment training at the Udairi Range Complex, 17 January 2008.

The M69 has a blue-painted lever and a blue body with white markings. This is to indicate that it is a safe practice grenade rather than a live fragmentation grenade like the M33 or M67.

=== C-13 Grenade ===
Canadian M67 variant, produced domestically by General Dynamics' Canadian division

== Users ==
- Argentina: Used in the Falklands War.
- Australia: Temporarily used by the Australian Defence Force following a safety incident with the domestically produced F1 grenade in 2007. Licensed made in Australia.
- Canada: Used by the Canadian Armed Forces; designated as the C-13 Grenade and produced domestically by General Dynamics' Canadian division.
- Japan: Used by the Japan Ground Self-Defense Force.
- Pakistan: Used by Pakistan Armed Forces.
- Saudi Arabia: Used by Saudi Arabian Armed Forces.
- Turkey: Used by the Turkish Armed Forces.
- United States: Primary fragmentation hand grenade of the United States Armed Forces since the 1960s.
- Ukraine: C-13 grenades donated as part of Canadian military aid during the Russo-Ukrainian War.

== See also ==
- United States hand grenades
- Arges Type HG 84 – (Austria)
- T13 Beano grenade – (United States)
- Defensive grenade wz. 33 – (Poland, Second Polish Republic)
- F1 grenade (Australia) – (Australia)
- GLI-F4 grenade – (France)
- HG 85 – (Switzerland)
- M26 grenade – (United States)
- M75 hand grenade – (Yugoslavia)
- Mecar M72 – (Belgium)
- Mk 2 grenade – (United States)
- Scalable Offensive Hand Grenade – (Norway, Sweden)
- SFG 87 – (Singapore)
- Spränghandgranat 07 – (Sweden)

== Bibliography ==
- Rottman, Gordon L. (2020). Vietnam War Booby Traps. Oxford: Osprey Publishing. ISBN 978-1472842459.
