= GLI-F4 grenade =

Tear gas grenade

Grenade GLI-F4
- Type: Hand grenade
- Place of origin: France

Service history
- In service: 2011-2020

Production history
- Manufacturer: Alsetex

Specifications
- Filling: TNT, RDX, CS gas

The GLI-F4 instant tear gas grenade (French: Grenade GLI-F4, alternatively known as the SAE 810) is an explosive tear gas grenade, manufactured by French company Alsetex. GLI-F4 grenades are classified as "weapons of war" (French: armes de guerre) in the French Internal Security Code.

== History ==
The GLI-F4 was first authorized alongside the OF-F1 grenade in French law enforcement operation, following Decree 2011–795 on June 30, 2011.

It replaced the OF-F1 grenade, which was first suspended after the death of Rémi Fraisse when used during the October 2014 Sivens Dam demonstrations and subsequently forbidden by Decree 2017–1029, on 10 May 2017.

=== Replacement ===
On 26 January 2020 then-interior minister, Christophe Castaner, announced the withdrawal of GLI-F4 grenades.

While the GLI-F4 replacement, GM2L grenade, does not contain TNT, critics such as the Human Rights League argue that it is not clear that these new grenades are much safer as they function in a similar way, while citing that the GLI-F4 was already being phased out.

== Design ==
The GLI-F4's tear gas consists of 10 g (0.35 oz) of CS gas. Meanwhile, the explosive charge consists of 26 g (0.92 oz) of TNT and 4 g (0.14 oz) of hexocire (a mixture of RDX and wax). It could be thrown and used effectively at a maximum of 200 meters.

== Usage ==
The usage of GLI-F4 has caused cases of mutilation, especially in demonstration events. Three thousand grenades of this type, some of which expired, were used on the Notre-Dame-des-Landes Zone to Defend in April 2018.

== Users ==
- France
  - Law enforcement in France
    - National Gendarmerie

== See also ==
- Hand grenade
- F1 grenade – (France)
- F1 grenade (Australia) – (Australia)
- LU 213 grenade – (France)
- M26 grenade – (United States)
- M67 grenade – (United States)
- Mk 2 grenade – (United States)
