= M75 hand grenade =

M-75 anti-personnel hand grenade
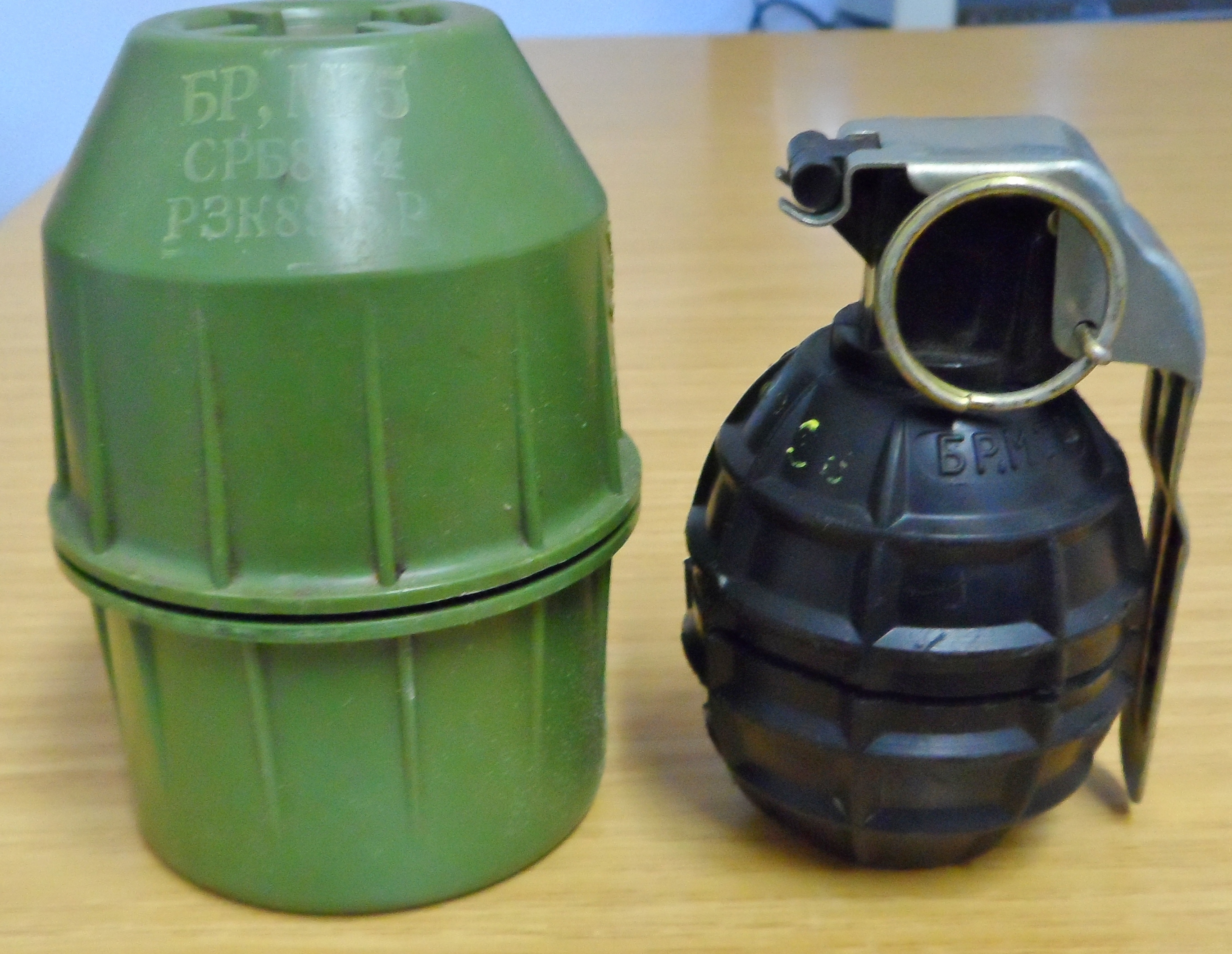
- The picture shows both the grenade and its plastic transportation can.
- Type: Hand grenade
- Place of origin: Yugoslavia

Service history
- Wars: Yugoslav Wars; North Kosovo crisis (2022–2026)

Production history
- Variants: M93 (North macedonia)

Specifications
- Mass: 335 g (11.8 oz)
- Length: 89 g (3.1 oz)
- Diameter: 57 mm (2.2 in)
- Filling: Plastic explosive
- Filling weight: 33 g (1.2 oz)

The M75 grenade (English: kashikara, Serbian Latin: kašikara, Serbian Cyrillic: кашикара) is a Yugoslav hand grenade, efficient in trenches, forests and bunkers.

== Design ==
The grenade consists of a body, an explosive charge and "mouse trap" style fuse mechanism, all contained in a plastic transportation can.

The core contains 3,000 steel balls with a diameter of 2.5–3 mm (0.098–0.118 in) with an effective killing radius of 12–18 m (39–59 ft), and a casualty radius of 30–54 m (98–177 ft). The explosive charge is 36–38 g (1.3–1.3 oz) of plastic explosive.

The fuse, named "bušon" in Serbian, has a delay time of 3 to 4.4 seconds. Its name comes from the Serbian word for a spoon, "kašika". In American English, the lever of the grenade is colloquially known as the "spoon".

== Variant ==
=== M-93 ===
North Macedonian production variant.

== Criminal usage ==
=== Croatia ===
In 2021, one M75 hand grenade was used in Pakrac, Croatia.

Milorad Arsenić, a former member of Serbian paramilitary forces in Croatia attacked three employees of Croatian power company HEP that came to disconnect his power for unpaid bills.

In 2024, an M75 hand grenade exploded at a party in Knin, Croatia, killing a 25-year-old man and injuring four others.

=== Kosovo ===
In 2023, one M75 hand grenade was used in the ethnically-mixed 'Bosniak Neighborhood' in North Mitrovica, Kosovo.

A car was damaged, in what minister of interior Xhelal Sveçla claimed to be an attack by criminal structures in reaction to the arrest of 3 ethnic Serbs in the town of Vushtrri, suspected of war crimes in the Kosovo War.

=== Sweden ===
A shipment of leftover M75 grenades (and the M-93) from the Yugoslav Wars was taken to Sweden and sold for as little as 20 kronor a piece to organised criminals and street gangs, who have been using them in numerous attacks since 2008 (ongoing as of 2025).

=== England ===
M75 grenades were used by criminal families in England, including an attack that killed two police officers in 2012.

=== Belgium ===
In 2018, two M75 hand grenades were used in Deurne, Antwerp. The attack is possibly linked to a drug war in Antwerp.

=== Germany ===
In 2001, the M75 was used to attack the VIP-Area of a Club in Hamburg. 9 People were injured, including the singer of Lord of the Lost, Chris Harms.

The M75 was used during a gang war in the region around Stuttgart in 2023. During a funeral of a gang member at the cemetery of Altbach near Esslingen, a member of a rival gang threw one M75 at the mourners. The grenade bounced of a tree branch, throwing it off course, and exploded near the ground, still leaving 15 people injured. According to police reports, a direct hit would have led to 20+ fatalities.

== See also ==
- M26 hand grenade – (United States)
- M67 hand grenade – (United States)
- RGD-5 – (Soviet Union)
