= F1 grenade (Australia) =

Grenade, Hand, Fragmentation, F1
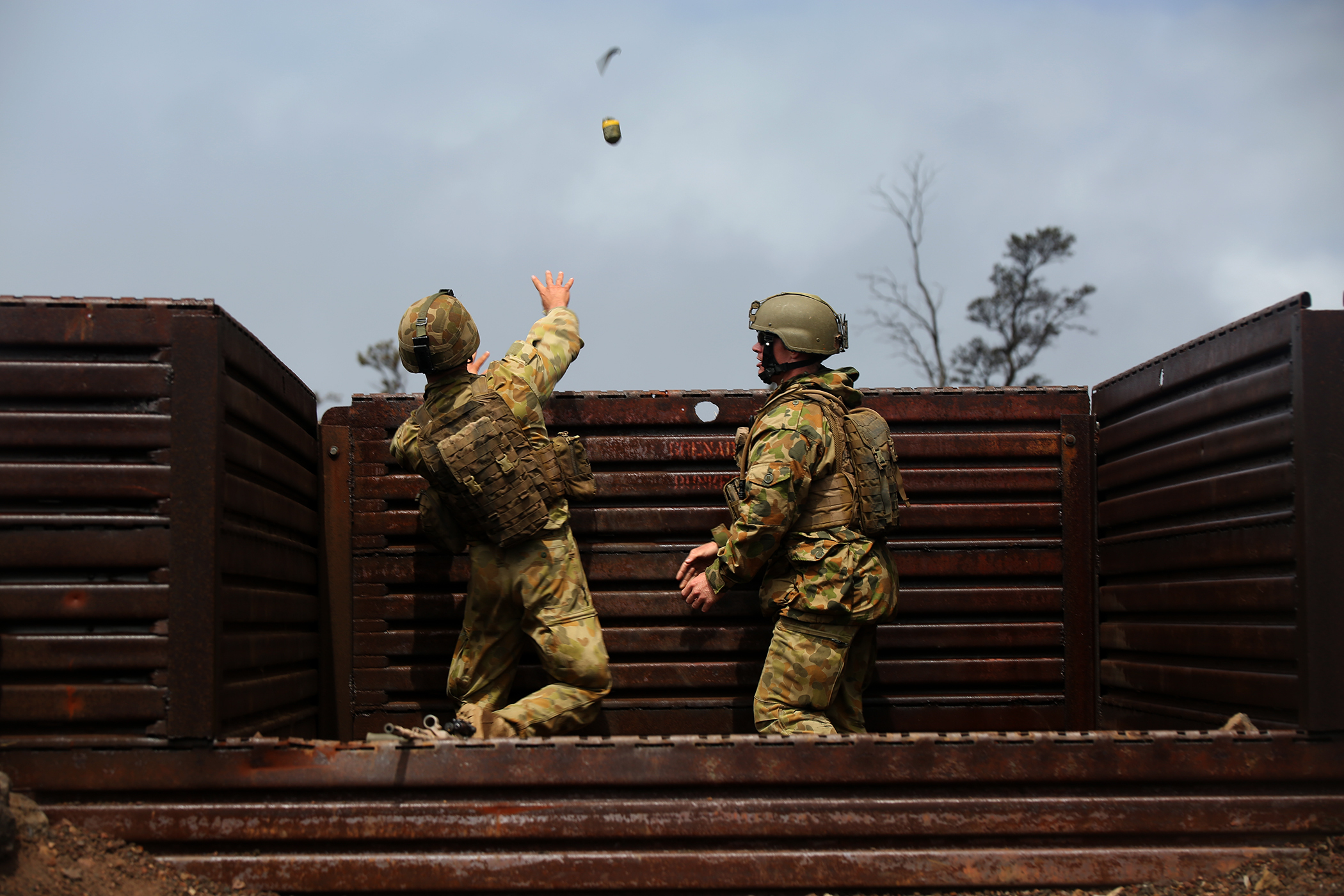
- Australian soldier lobbing a grenade during RIMPAC 2014.
- Type: Time-fuzed hand grenade
- Place of origin: Australia

Service history
- In service: Late 1990s–present
- Wars: War in Afghanistan (2001–2021); Iraq War; Russo-Ukrainian War

Production history
- Designer: Australian Defence Industries
- Designed: 1990s
- Manufacturer: Thales Australia (formerly Australian Defence Industries)
- Produced: 1990s–present

Specifications
- Mass: 375 g (13.2 oz)
- Height: 96 mm (3.8 in)
- Diameter: 58 mm (2.3 in)
- Filling: RDX, phlegmatized with paraffin wax
- Filling weight: 62 g (2.2 oz): 30 g (1.1 oz) of RDX, 32 g (1.1 oz) of wax
- Detonation mechanism: Time-delay fuze (4.5–5.5 seconds)

The F1 grenade (formally Grenade, Hand, Fragmentation, F1) is a grenade used by the Australian Defence Force as a primary defensive anti-personnel hand grenade. The grenade is manufactured by Thales Australia's Australian Munitions arm at their munitions factory in Benalla, Victoria.

== History ==
The F1 hand grenade was tested and manufactured by Australian Defence Industries (now Thales Australia) in the mid-1990s and eventually entered into service with the Australian Defence Force (ADF) in the late 1990s.

The grenade is the first Australian manufactured grenade utilised by the ADF, as previous grenades include the British-made Mills bomb, used in World War II and the Korean War, and the American-made M26 grenade, which was utilised by Australian forces in the Vietnam War and was replaced by the F1 grenade.

=== Future grenade development ===
In 2013 it was announced that Thales-owned Australian Munitions and German company Diehl Defence would work together to develop an insensitive munitions variant of the F1 grenade.

In September 2018, it was announced that Thales Australia and Chemring Group signed a joint memorandum of understanding covering cooperation in the "design, development and manufacture of a future range of grenades."

This includes fragmentation, offensive, smoke and training grenades, to be designed and manufactured at Thales Australia's Australian Government-owned facilities in Benalla, Victoria and Mulwala, New South Wales, and Chemring Group's production facility in Lara, Victoria.

This agreement on a future range of grenades will focus on the design and manufacture of a "modular hand grenade product range," allowing a user-selectable detonation mechanism depending on the desired battlefield effect.

This new range of modular grenades would combine the effects of the F1 fragmentation grenade and the F2 blast grenade into a selectable modular grenade with capabilities similar to the German Diehl Defence-manufactured DM51 modular hand grenade, which has a removable fragmentation sleeve.

While the design and development of this grenade is slated to primarily focus on the current and future military needs of the ADF, the grenade range will also be made available for export customers under the Australian Government's Defence Export Strategy. Overall, this agreement supports Australia's ability for independent "munitions and small arms research, design, development and manufacture."

== Design and features ==
The F1 grenade is a hand-thrown high-explosive anti-personnel defensive grenade deployed by the Australian Defence Force to clear enemy combatants from bunkers, fire trenches, dugouts and buildings.

The grenade is classified as an individual weapon suitable for all close combat situations and is designed to produce a lethal blast radius of 6 m (20 ft), a casualty radius of 15 m (49 ft), and a maximum dangerous radius of 30 m (98 ft).

The F1 grenade has an overall mass of 375 g (13.2 oz), and contains over 4,000 2.4 mm (0.094 in) steel balls arranged to "achieve uniform distribution of lethal fragments through 360°" on detonation. It works on a 4.5–5.5 second time-delay fuze, with an explosive composition mass of 30 g (1.1 oz) of RDX and 32 g (1.1 oz) of paraffin wax; the wax is used to phlegmatize the RDX.

The fragmentation mechanism of the F1 grenade suits defensive applications, most effective in open areas, as the desired lethality of the grenade is performed through the uniform distribution of a "fragmentation matrix".

== Variants ==
Thales Australia produces two variants of the F1 grenade; the F2 blast grenade and the F3 practice grenade.

=== F2 blast grenade ===
The F2 blast grenade (formally "Grenade, Hand, Blast, F2") is an offensive grenade variant of the F1, filled with 110 g (3.9 oz) of RDX-based high-explosive in a plastic body, and no fragmentation mechanism. The F2, like any other model of offensive grenade, is designed to damage, daze or otherwise stun its targets with overpressure shockwaves, rather than by fragmentation.

Because it does not use fragmentation, the F2 has more predictable blast patterns and increased user safety compared to the F1, and is chiefly suited to use within confined areas for close-quarter combat.

=== F3 practice grenade ===
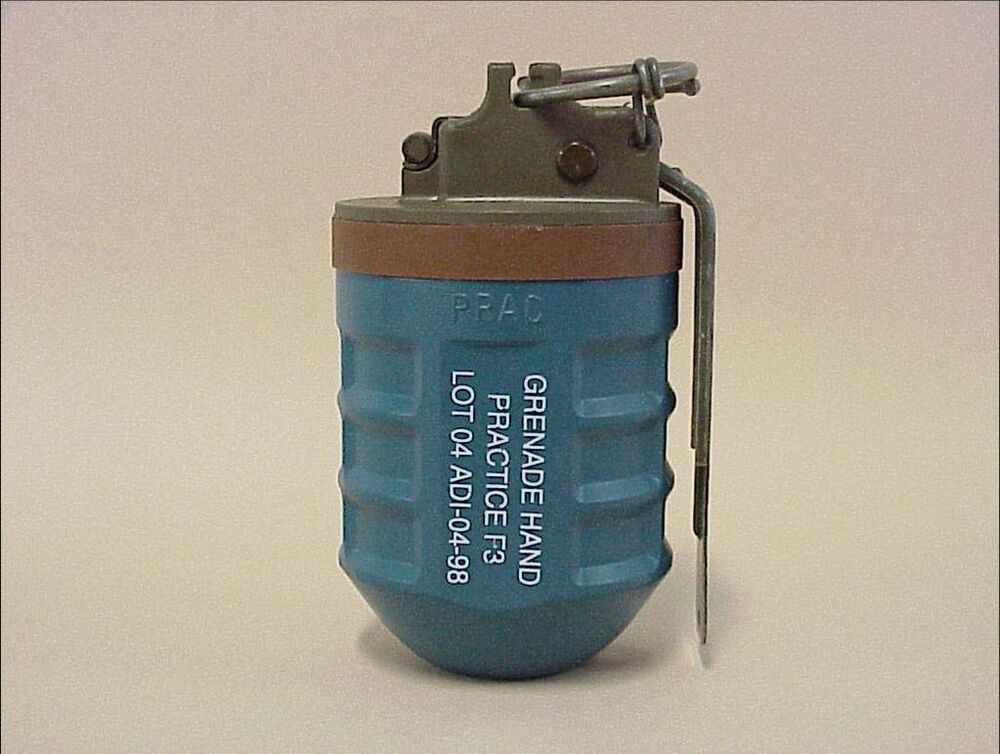
The F3 practice grenade is a non-fragmenting replica used for training purposes.

The F3 practice grenade (formally "Grenade, Hand, Practice, F3") is a non-fragmenting replica of the F1 grenade used for training purposes and produces an acoustic and smoke signature to simulate the detonation and functioning of the F1 hand grenade during training by the Australian Defence Force. The grenade itself is near-identical to the F1 in physical characteristics consisting of a high-impact aluminium die cast body with a replaceable pyrotechnic fuze with a 0.5 g (0.018 oz) flash composition.

This fuze creates audible output and a distinct visual white smoke cloud visible up to 200 m (220 yd) to indicate the simulated functioning of the grenade.

== Safety issues ==
The F1 hand grenade has been involved in numerous safety incidents during both manufacturing and deployment within the Australian Defence Force. These incidents not only posed safety risks to the civilian employees involved in the grenades manufacturing, but also to the safety of members of the Australian Defence Force deployed overseas.

=== 1995 St Marys incident ===
The first significant safety incident involving the F1 occurred on 14 November 1995, at an Australian Defence Industries shell filling factory in St Marys, New South Wales. The detonation occurred within a grenade testing facility at 8:36 a.m., while 4 employees were dismantling a defective F1 grenade. During the dismantling process, the grenade accidentally detonated on a workbench surrounded by the 4 employees, all of whom were injured as a result, two of them critically.

Despite criticisms regarding employee safety, as no employees were behind a blast shield or wearing body armour, as well as criticisms of St Mary's handling of ordnance as the explosion occurred next to a pallet of 1,000 live grenades - damaging 48 of them, a coroner's inquest into the matter was never held.

=== 2007 Defence Proof and Experimental Establishment incident ===
On 12 September 2007, a defence contractor was seriously injured by the accidental detonation of an F1 grenade at the Defence Proof and Experimental Establishment in Graytown, Victoria. The contractor lost his right hand and suffered leg injuries. In response, the chief of the Defence Force, Air Chief Marshal Angus Houston, ordered an immediate pause in the training use of the F1 grenade to allow the force to "determine that the right measures are in place to ensure the safety of our people and the reliability of the grenade."

After the pause of using F1s, the ADF procured sufficient stocks from the United States of M67 grenades for training use and overseas deployments. The F1 was released back into service shortly thereafter on 17 October 2007.

=== Reported detonation failures ===
Prior to the ADF's decision to suspend the training and combat use of the F1 grenade, a "small number" of failures to detonate were reported in 2006. These reports came from Australian soldiers deployed in the Middle East and saw the ADF take "rapid steps to confirm the reliability of grenades in service."

Following the temporary suspension of the F1 grenade from use within the ADF, stocks of M67 grenades were procured for use by Australian forces deployed in the Middle East, as mentioned above. After the re-introduction of the F1 back into service in October 2007, no subsequent failures to detonate have been reported.

== Users ==
- Australia: Used by the ADF in East Timor (UNTAET, UNMISET and UNMIT), Afghanistan (War in Afghanistan), Iraq (Iraq War) and in RAMSI.
- Russia: Some F1s reported to be used by Russian troops from captured stocks in the Russo-Ukrainian War.
- Ukraine: Used by Ukrainian troops, likely before the start of the Russo-Ukrainian War.
