= M26 grenade =

American fragmentation hand grenade (1953–1988)

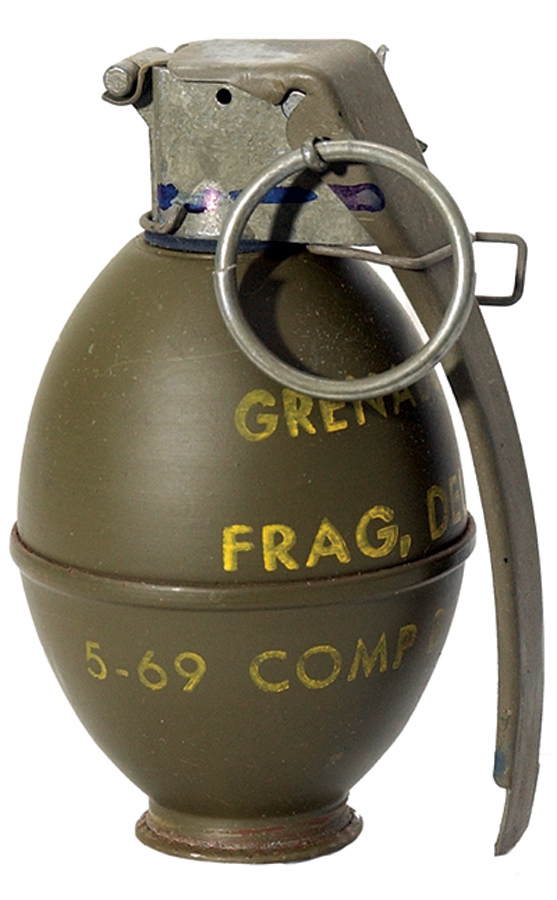
- M61 grenade, a M26A1 fitted with a safety clip
- Type: Fragmentation hand grenade
- Place of origin: United States

Service history
- In service: 1953−1988 (US only)
- Used by: See users
- Wars: Korean War; Vietnam War; South African Border War; Six-Day War; Yom Kippur War; Falklands War

Production history
- Produced: 1952−1968 (US only) Production continues in some countries
- Variants: See variants

Specifications (M61)
- Mass: 16 oz (450 g)
- Length: 3.9 in (99 mm)
- Diameter: 2.25 in (57 mm)
- Filling: Composition B with tetryl booster
- Filling weight: 5.5 oz (160 g) (Comp B); 0.3 oz (8.5 g) (Tetryl)
- Detonation mechanism: M204A1 or M204A2, 4−5 second pyrotechnic delay fuse

The M26 (designated during development as the T38) is a fragmentation hand grenade developed by the United States Armed Forces.

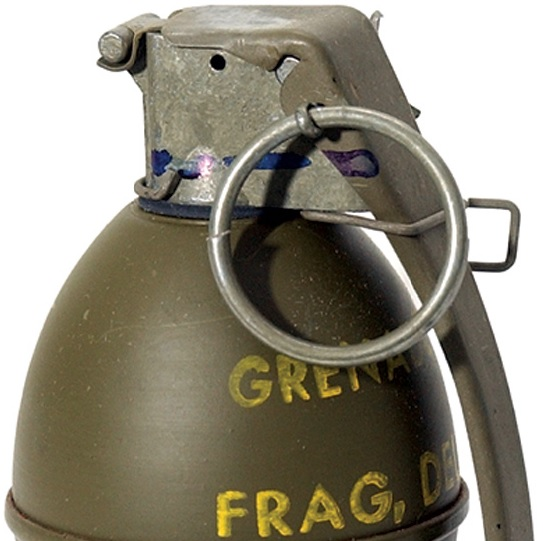
M61 showing the additional safety clip

== History ==
Distributed to troops during the spring of 1953, the M26 saw limited use during the Korean War. In 1954, tests were conducted under arctic conditions: the grenade performed well under temperatures below 0°, and no duds were reported, though it was also reported that the detonation was ineffective under snow and soldiers had some difficulty pulling the pin while wearing winter gloves.

The M26A1 and M61 were widely used in Vietnam. The M26A2 and M57 impact fuzes were unpopular with soldiers: after arming they caused friendly casualties if accidentally dropped or if they struck vegetation. M26s were used in Vietnam for booby traps.

During the conflict, new grenades were fitted with safety clips during the mid-1960s. The pins could be snagged in the thick vegetation resulting in accidents and there were also occasional cases of prisoners of war suicidally lunging at their captors to pull the pin. According to Rottman, some soldiers who trained with unclipped grenades failed to remove the clips before throwing, which posed the danger of an enemy finding and throwing the grenade back. The M26A1 and M61 were also often employed as booby traps.

The M26 series (M26/M61) began to be replaced by the M33 series grenade (M33/M67) in 1969. While the M26 proved to be effective, it had an inconsistent casualty radius and was heavy, at 1 lb (0.45 kg). Though production ceased in the United States in 1968, stockpiles remained in US service during the 1970s. The M61 was listed as a standard issue grenade as late as 1988 in US Army technical manuals.

== Background ==
During World War II the flaws of the then standard issue Mk 2 grenade were already known: it suffered from poor and irregular fragmentation, while the blast and fragmentation effect on both ends were uneven, negatively affecting the casualty radius. The US Army conducted some field tests with the T12 and T13 "Beano" fragmentation grenades, but after some accidents, they were ultimately rejected by the troops.

In May 1946, the War Department placed the specifications for a replacement: it needed to have a selective combination of an impact and time-delay fuse, capable of being used in both offensive and defensive roles and it also could be adapted for use as a rifle grende. In 1948, an interim design was chosen for further development and in January 1949 work began on what would become the M26. The resulting T38 experimental grenade used a notched metal coil with an additional fragmentation layer on the base plug to provide a more even casualty radius. It was formally adopted by the United States Army in 1952 as the M26.

== Design ==
The M26 uses an oval-shaped sheet steel body (giving it the nickname "lemon grenade") lined with a 0.13 in (3.3 mm) diameter metal coil notched every 0.20 in (5.1 mm) to ensure even fragmentation. It also features a fragmentation sleeve at the bottom of the filler cavity. According to Rottman, upon detonation the M26 releases 1,150 fragments that can inflict serious wounds in a radius of 15 m (16 yd), while the kill zone is 5 m (5.5 yd), though US Army manuals note that the dispersal radius can reach up to 250 yd (230 m). The fragments generated by the M26 and L2 series can penetrate thick clothing and damage internal organs.

Fuses used include the pyrotechnic delay M204A1 and M204A2, which have a 4−5 second delay and the M217, which detonates on impact. Grenades fitted with the M217 are also fitted with a secondary pyrotechnic delay mechanism to detonate the grenade after 4 seconds if it fails to do so upon impact. In the mid-1960s a safety wire clip (commonly known as the "jungle clip") was added to newly produced grenades to better suit the jungle warfare in Vietnam.

The M26 series uses a 5.5 oz (160 g) Composition B filler. All grenades, with the exception of the impact-fused variants have a 0.3 oz (8.5 g) Tetryl booster charge. The M61 grenade (a M26A1 fitted with a safety clip) can be thrown at a range up to 40 m (44 yd) by an average soldier. The M26 series (with exception of the M57) can be launched from a rifle using an adapter and a blank cartridge up to 170 yd (160 m).

The grenades are individually stored inside fiberboard containers and packed 25 or 30 to a crate.

== Variants ==
=== Live variants ===
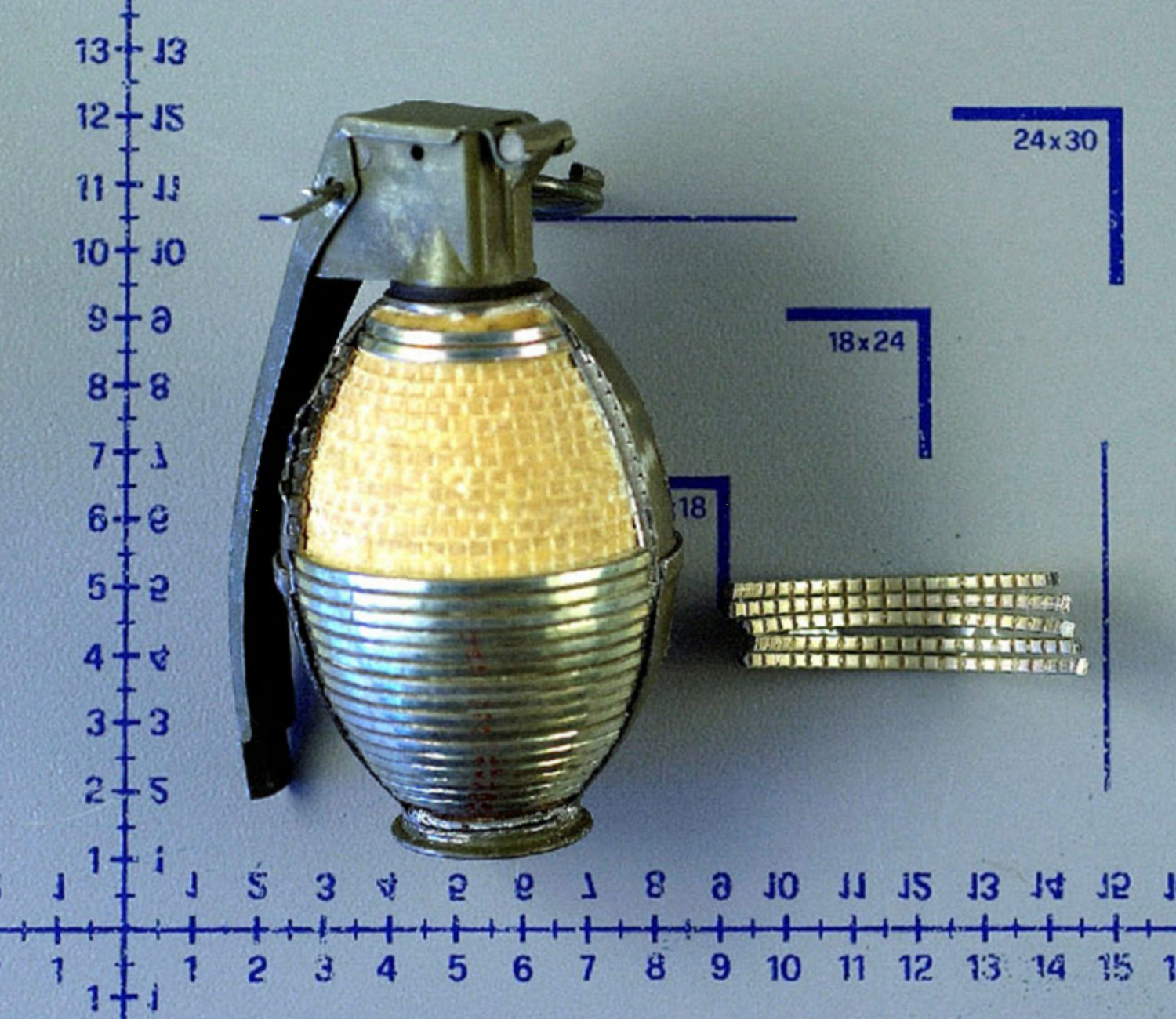
West German DM41 fragmentation grenade filled with Composition B. This example has been dissected to reveal the fragmentation sleeve and explosive charge

- T38 − Experimental variant, standardized as the M26 in 1952
- M26 − The original variant of the M26 series. Like the late versions of the Mk 2 grenade, it uses either the M204A1 or M204A2 pyrotechnic delay fuse. It can be fitted with an adapter and launched like a rifle grenade using a blank cartridge up to 170 yd (160 m)
- M26A1 − Slightly modified variant of the M26 to improve fragmentation. It can also be launched as a rifle grenade
- M26A2 − Variant fitted with a M217 impact fuse or the M204A1. If the M217 impact mechanism fails, a self-destruction device detonates the grenade after 4 seconds. If this also fails to work, the grenade becomes inert after 30 seconds. Early impact grenades have a red lever with or without the word "IMPACT" stenciled in black letters, while later versions have "IMPACT" embossed on the levers. The M26A2 and M57 bodies does not contain booster pellets
- M56 − A M26A2 fitted with a M215 pyrotechnic delay fuse instead of the M204A1. According to Owen, it can be used as a rifle grenade like the M26 and M26A1
- M57 − A modified impact-detonated version of the M26A2 with a safety clip (also known as the "jungle clip") added. According to Owen, this variant cannot be used as a rifle grenade since the gas pressure can trigger the impact detonator prematurely. Also, a minimum trajectory height of 13–16 ft (4–5 m) must be achieved to activate the detonator
- M61 − Redesignation for M26A1s fitted with the safety clip. Remained in service with the US Army as late as 1988

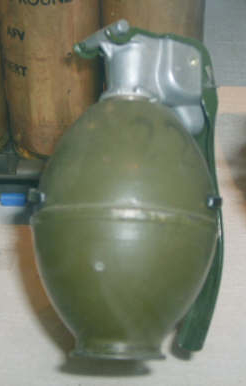
A British L2-A2 fragmentation grenade

- L2A1 − Adopted in 1964, it is a British copy of the M26A1 with a 3.6−5.5 second delay fuse. It replaced the No. 36M grenade
- L2A2 − A L2A1 with a redesigned fuse well for ease of mass production, like its predecessor it is filled with 6.0 oz (170 g) a mixture of TNT and RDX
- DM-41 Splitterhandgranate − A West German copy of the M26A1 produced by Diehl Defence. It was replaced in 1978 by another Diehl design, the DM51 Spreng/Splitterhandgranate (blast/fragmentation grenade)

=== Practice variants ===
- M30 − A cast body training version of the M26 and M26A1 with a reusable cast iron body painted blue and filled with 21 gr (1.4 g) of black powder. After being primed, the black powder charge ignites after 4 or 5 seconds resulting in a loud report (similar to a firecracker) and a puff of white smoke
- M62 − A M30 with a safety clip used to simulate the operation of a M61 grenade. Safety clips taken from expended live grenades can be reused on the M62, provided they aren't damaged or distorted
- L3A1, L3A2, and L3A3 − British dummy grenades similar in construction and appearance to the L2 grenade, but are painted light blue
- L4A1 and L4A2 − British training grenades fitted with the L30 percussion fuse and painted dark blue

== Users ==
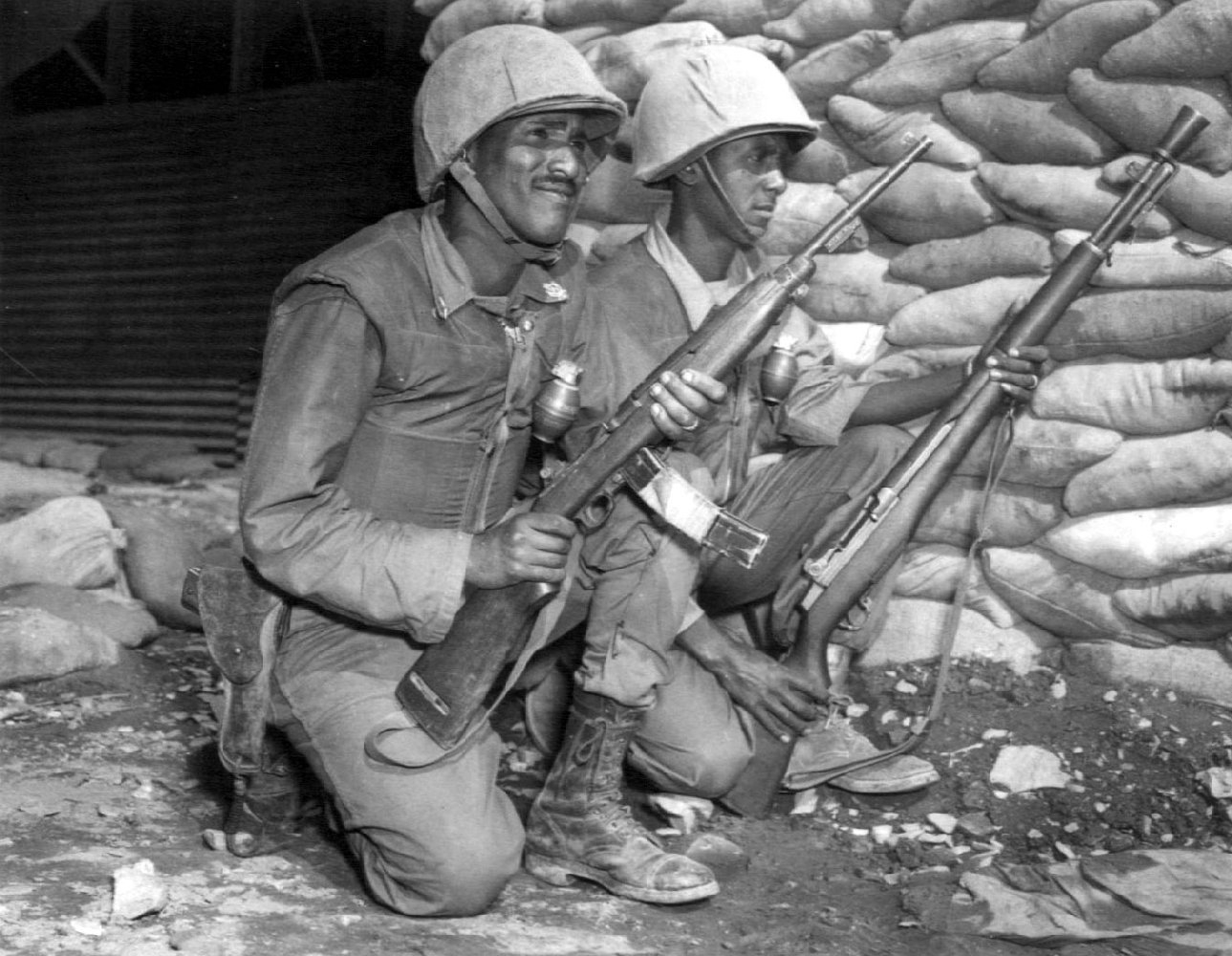
Ethiopian Soldiers from the Kagnew Battalion, 7th Inf. Div., in Korea, 1953

- Australia − Produced the M26A1 and M26A2 (delay) under license
- Brazil − Used by the Brazilian Army
- Canada − M26, M26A1, M26A2 (delay), and M61. Replaced since 2000 by the C13.
- Chile
- Colombia − Used by the Colombian Army. Produced by Military Industry of Colombia.
- Ethiopian Empire − Used during the Korean War.
- West Germany − Produced the M26A1 locally as the DM41 Splitterhandgranate. It was used by the West German Bundeswehr until the DM51 grenade was adopted in 1978
- Guatemala
- Israel − The M26A2 was adopted in Israel as the M26, and is still in use in that country. Its variant added an improved safety fuze in 2012, aimed to ensure the grenade will not explode if struck by an enemy bullet.
- Japan − Used by the Japan Ground Self-Defense Force, ex-US Army stock.
- North Korea − Used by North Korean Special forces.
- South Korea
- Liberia
- New Zealand − M61 variant
- Nicaragua
- Nigeria − British L2 series supplied to Nigerian government forces during the Nigerian Civil War.
- Pakistan
- Philippines − Used by Armed Forces of the Philippines and Philippine National Police-Special Action Force
- Portugal − Portugal adopted the M26A1 and produced it under license as the M312.
- Rwanda − South African M26 grenades supplied to the Rwandan government in October 1992.
- South Africa − South Africa produced the M963, itself a variant of the Portuguese M312, under license. Production would later comprise a copy of the standard M26 grenade designated as the M26 HE Hand Grenade, a blue training version with a reusable aluminium body designated as the M26 Practice Hand Grenade, and an inert training version designated as the M26 Drill Hand Grenade, with these designs remaining in production and in South African military and police service.
- Taiwan
- United Kingdom − The L2 series replaced the M36 Mills Bomb in British service. It was replaced by the L109A1 grenade during the 2000s.
- United States − The M26 was introduced during the Korean War. It was limited standard issue at the beginning of the Vietnam War and was soon replaced by the M26A1 / M61 (1958), M26A2 / M57 (1960), and M33 / M67 (1968) as standard issue.
- South Vietnam − South Vietnam received the M26 grenade as US aid. Production and sales of the M26 continued to South Vietnam even after the US military adopted the M26A1 / M61 and M33 / M67.
