= List of equipment used by Russian separatist forces in Ukraine =

List of equipment of the DPR/LPR

This is a list of equipment of the armed forces of the Donetsk People's Republic and Luhansk People's Republic currently used in the Russo-Ukrainian War.

DPR 1st Army Corps forces emblem

LPR 2nd Army Corps forces emblem

== Small arms ==
=== Pistols ===
Name	Type	Cartridge	Origin	Photo	Notes
Tokarev TT-33	Semi-automatic pistol	7.62×25mm Tokarev	Soviet Union		8-round magazine. Limited usage.
Makarov PM	Semi-automatic pistol	9×18mm Makarov	Soviet Union		8-round magazine. Most commonly used pistol by the pro-Russian separatists.
Stechkin APS	Machine pistol	9×18mm Makarov	Soviet Union		20-round magazine.
Type 54 pistol	Semi-automatic pistol	7.62×25mm Tokarev	China		At least one was documented in Severodonetsk in 2019.

=== Submachine guns ===
Name	Type	Cartridge	Origin	Photo	Notes
PPSh-41	Submachine gun	7.62×25mm Tokarev	Soviet Union		35-round box magazine and 71-round drum magazine. Limited usage in the beginning of the conflict.
PPS-43	Submachine gun	7.62×25mm Tokarev	Soviet Union		35-round box magazine. Limited usage in the beginning of the conflict.

=== Shotguns ===
Name	Type	Cartridge	Origin	Photo	Notes
Akkar Altay	Semi-automatic shotgun	12 gauge	Turkey		
Armscor Model 30	Pump-action shotgun	12 gauge	Philippines		
Saiga-12	Semi-automatic shotgun	12 gauge	Russia		

=== Bolt-action rifles ===
Name	Type	Cartridge	Origin	Photo	Notes
Mosin–Nagant M1891/30	Bolt action rifle	7.62×54mmR	Russian Empire / Soviet Union		5-round magazine, optionally with a PU scope in sniper role.

=== Semi-automatic rifles ===
Name	Type	Cartridge	Origin	Photo	Notes
SKS	Semi-automatic rifle	7.62×39mm	Soviet Union		

=== Assault rifles ===
Name	Type	Cartridge	Origin	Photo	Notes
AKM	Assault rifle	7.62×39mm	Soviet Union		
AKMS	Assault rifle	7.62×39mm	Soviet Union		
AK-74	Assault rifle	5.45×39mm	Soviet Union		
AKS-74	Assault rifle	5.45×39mm	Soviet Union		
AKS-74U	Assault carbine	5.45×39mm	Soviet Union		
AK-74M	Assault rifle	5.45×39mm	Soviet Union / Russia		

=== Precision rifles ===
Name	Type	Cartridge	Origin	Photo	Notes
AS Val	Suppressed assault rifle	9×39mm	Soviet Union		
VSS	Suppressed assault rifle	9×39mm	Soviet Union		
SVD	Designated marksman rifle	7.62×54mmR	Soviet Union		
Zbroyar Z-10	Designated marksman rifle	7.62×51mm NATO	Ukraine		

=== Anti-materiel rifles ===
Name	Type	Cartridge	Origin	Photo	Notes
PTRD	Anti-tank rifle	14.5×114mm	Soviet Union		Single-shot reloadable rifle.
PTRS-41	Anti-tank rifle	14.5×114mm	Soviet Union		5-round magazine.
KSVK / ASVK	Anti-materiel rifle	12.7×108mm	Russia		Introduced for service with Russian forces in 2013. Any exports on this rifle is unknown.
OSV-96	Anti-materiel rifle	12.7×108mm	Russia		Limited use.

=== Machine guns ===
Name	Type	Cartridge	Origin	Photo	Notes
RPD	Light machine gun	7.62×39mm	Soviet Union		100-round drum magazine.
RPK	Light machine gun	7.62×39mm	Soviet Union		40-round capacity box magazine or 75-round drum magazine.
RPK-74 / RPK-74M	Light machine gun	5.45×39mm M74	Soviet Union		30 or 45-round magazine.
PM M1910/30	Medium machine gun	7.62×54mmR	Russian Empire; Soviet Union		Belt fed with 250-round cloth belts. Seen twice in 2014, at least one was non-operational.
PK / PKM	General-purpose machine gun	7.62×54mmR	Soviet Union		Belt fed with 100, 200 or 250-round boxes. In Ukraine, the PKM is produced under the name KM-7.62.
Zastava M53	General-purpose machine gun	7.92×57mm	Yugoslavia		Captured from Ukrainian forces in spring 2014.
DShK	Heavy machine gun	12.7×108mm	Soviet Union		Belt fed with 50-round boxes.
KPV / KPVT	Heavy machine gun	14.5×114mm	Soviet Union		Belt fed with 40 or 50-round boxes.
NSV / NSVT	Heavy machine gun	12.7×108mm	Soviet Union		Belt fed with 50-round boxes. In Ukraine, the NSV is produced under the name KM-12.7 or KT-12.7.
PKP Pecheneg	General-purpose machine gun	7.62×54mmR	Russia		PKP is not known to be in service with Ukrainian forces, and has only been exported outside of Russia in limited quantities.

== Explosives/armor-piercing weapons ==
=== Grenades and grenade launchers ===
Name	Type	Diameter	Origin	Photo	Notes
RG-41	Fragmentation grenade	55mm	Soviet Union		5-meter kill radius. Limited usage.
RG-42	Fragmentation grenade	54mm	Soviet Union		At least one was documented in Hrytsenkove in 2019.
F-1	Fragmentation grenade	55mm	Soviet Union		Reported to be bombarded on government forces using multirotor unmanned aerial vehicles by pro-Russian separatists.
RGD-5	Fragmentation grenade	58mm	Soviet Union		Propels ~350 fragments, 5-meter kill radius, 3.2–4-second fuse.
RGN	Fragmentation grenade	60mm	Soviet Union		4–10-meter kill radius, 3.2–4.2-second fuse.
GP-25	Under-barrel grenade launcher	40mm	Soviet Union		Can be fitted to AK type rifles.
AGS-17	Automatic grenade launcher	30mm	Soviet Union		Belt fed with 29-round drums, high rate of fire.

=== Mines ===
Name	Type	Detonation	Origin	Photo	Notes
MON-50	Anti-personnel mine	Tripwire/Command	Soviet Union		Propels ~485/540 steel projectiles to a kill radius of 50 meters.
MON-90	Anti-personnel mine	Tripwire/Command	Soviet Union		Propels ~2000 steel projectiles to a kill radius of 90 meters.
OZM-72	Anti-personnel bounding mine	Tripwire/Command	Soviet Union		~500g TNT, propels ~2400 steel projectiles.
MON-100	Anti-personnel mine	Pressure	Soviet Union		Propels ~400 steel projectiles to a kill radius of 100 meters.
PMN	Anti-personnel mine	Pressure	Soviet Union		240g TNT
PMN-4	Anti-personnel mine	Pressure	Soviet Union		50g TG-40 (RDX/TNT)
TM-62M	Anti-tank mine	Pressure	Soviet Union		7.5 kg TNT.

=== Anti-tank ===
Name	Type	Diameter	Origin	Photo	Notes
RPG-7	Rocket-propelled grenade	Warhead diameter varies	Soviet Union		Reloadable launcher.
RPG-18	Rocket-propelled grenade	64mm	Soviet Union		Some of these launchers captured from the separatists were evidently brought from Russia.
RPG-22	Rocket-propelled grenade	72.5mm	Soviet Union		Single-shot disposable launcher.
RPG-26	Rocket-propelled grenade	72.5mm	Soviet Union		Single-shot disposable launcher.
SPG-9	Recoilless rifle	73mm	Soviet Union		Single-shot reloadable launcher.
9K111 Fagot	Anti-tank missile	120mm	Soviet Union		Wire-guided anti-tank missile system.
9M113 Konkurs	Anti-tank missile	135mm	Soviet Union		Wire-guided anti-tank missile system.
9K115 Metis	Anti-tank missile	94mm	Soviet Union		Wire-guided anti-tank missile system.
9K114 Shturm	Anti-tank missile	130mm	Soviet Union		Wire-guided anti-tank missile system.
9M133 Kornet	Anti-tank missile	152mm	Soviet Union / Russia		The system components were found discarded on a battlefield near Starobesheve. It has not been exported to Ukraine.

=== Flamethrowers ===
Name	Type	Diameter	Origin	Photo	Notes
RPO-A Shmel	Rocket-propelled flamethrower	93mm	Soviet Union		Some of the launchers captured from the separatists were evidently produced in Russia in 2000s.
MRO-A	Rocket-propelled flamethrower	72.5mm	Russia		It is not known to have been exported outside of Russia.

== Vehicles ==
The ongoing war makes the list below include tentative estimates.

=== Tanks ===
Name	Type	Quantity	Origin	Photo	Notes
T-34-85	Medium tank	1+	Soviet Union		A number of T-34s were reactivated by the separatist forces from war memorials.
T-54	Medium tank	1+	Soviet Union		Taken from Donetsk historical museum on 7 July 2014.
T-62M/BV	Main battle tank	N/A	Soviet Union		Assigned to reservist units during 2022.
T-64A/B/BM/BV	Main battle tank	400 (DPR claim) (Note: Galeotti points out that: "On paper this is a truly formidable force,(...) but shortages of trained crews and maintenance problems mean that in practice the field force has only a fraction of that strength." (Galeotti 2019, p. 27))	Soviet Union; Ukraine		Some were reportedly supplied from Russia. T-64BM serviceability doubtful.
T-72B/B3/BA/B mod. 1989	Main battle tank	300 (DPR claim)	Soviet Union; Russia		Three seen in Sverdlovsk. Six seen in 2015. Over 34 claimed supplied by Russia. T72BM not exported from Russia. One seen in convoy in Sverdlovsk.
T-80/BV	Main battle tank	57 (DPR claim)	Soviet Union		At least six T-80 tanks were spotted by the OSCE in January 2015 near Donetsk.
T-90	Main battle tank	3	Soviet Union / Russia		In 2018 the DPR claimed to have 3 T-90 tanks in service.

=== Infantry fighting vehicles ===
Name	Type	Quantity	Origin	Photo	Notes
BMP-1 / BMP-1P / BMP-1KSh	Infantry fighting vehicle	1+	Soviet Union		
BMP-2	Infantry fighting vehicle	1+	Soviet Union		
BMD-1	Airborne infantry fighting vehicle	1	Soviet Union		
BMD-2	Airborne infantry fighting vehicle	1+	Soviet Union		
BTR-4	Infantry fighting vehicle	1+	Ukraine		

=== Armoured personnel carriers ===
Name	Type	Quantity	Origin	Photo	Notes
BTR-60PB	Armoured personnel carrier	1+	Soviet Union		
BTR-70	Armoured personnel carrier	1+	Soviet Union		
BTR-80	Armoured personnel carrier	1+	Soviet Union		Some were reportedly supplied from Russia.
BTR-D	Armoured personnel carrier	1	Soviet Union		
MT-LB	Armoured personnel carrier	1+	Soviet Union		Some were reportedly supplied from Russia.
9K114 Shturm	Armoured personnel carrier	1	Soviet Union		
GT-MU	Armoured personnel carrier	1	Soviet Union		
MT-LBVM	Armoured personnel carrier	1+	Soviet Union / Russia		At least one destroyed near Ilovaisk.
MT-LBVMK	Armoured personnel carrier	1+	Soviet Union; Russia		At least one destroyed in Ukraine in September 2014.
MT-LB 6MA	Armoured personnel carrier	1+	Soviet Union; Russia		At least one destroyed near Ilovaisk.
BTR-82AM	Armoured personnel carrier	1+	Soviet Union; Russia	BTR-82A	It was only adopted in Russia in early 2013. It is not known to have been exported to any other country. Seen on videos filmed by the separatists. Also seen destroyed in Novosvitlivka.

=== Armored scout vehicles ===
Name	Type	Quantity	Origin	Photo	Notes
BRM-1K	Combat reconnaissance vehicle	1+	Soviet Union		
BRDM-2	Amphibious armoured scout car	1+	Soviet Union		

=== Armoured recovery vehicles ===
Name	Type	Quantity	Origin	Photo	Notes
BREM-1	Armoured recovery vehicle	1+	Soviet Union		
IMR-2	Armoured recovery vehicle	1+	Soviet Union		
BTS-4	Armoured recovery vehicle	1+	Soviet Union; Ukraine		

=== Minelayers ===
Name	Type	Quantity	Origin	Photo	Notes
GMZ-3	Minelayer	1	Soviet Union		

=== Trenchers ===
Name	Type	Quantity	Origin	Photo	Notes
MDK-3	Trencher	1+	Soviet Union		One captured from Ukrainian forces.
TKM-2	Trencher	1+	Soviet Union		At least one was spotted by the OSCE in January 2018.

=== Light armored vehicles ===
Name	Type	Quantity	Origin	Photo	Notes
UAZ-23632-148 Esaul	Armoured utility vehicle	15+	Russia		Photographed by OSCE monitors using a drone at a training area in April 2021.
Vodnik	Infantry mobility vehicle	1+	Russia		Seen in Krasnodon.
BPM-97 / Dozor / Dozor-N / Vystrel	Light armored vehicle	10+	Russia		Four seen in the late December Luhansk People's Republic military exercises. 10 vehicles seen in Krasnodon, several seen in Luhansk.
Humvee	High-mobility multipurpose vehicle	1-2+	United States		Captured in Debaltsevo after being abandoned by Ukrainian forces.

=== Logistics and utility vehicles ===
Name	Type	Quantity	Origin	Photo	Notes
UAZ-452	Off-road van	2+	Soviet Union		One seen in 2014. At least one ambulance vehicle was spotted in 2015 by the OSCE.
UAZ-469	Light utility vehicle	2+	Soviet Union		Two seen north of Sloviansk.
Ural-4320	Medium cargo truck	17+	Soviet Union		At least 17 Ural-4320 seen towing 155mm Msta-B howitzers in November 2014.
Kamaz-4310	Medium cargo truck	80+	Soviet Union		At least five Kamaz-4310 were spotted by the OSCE in 2018.
Kamaz-5350	Heavy cargo truck	1+	Russia		Seen towing 122mm D-30 howitzers in 2014. At least one spotted by the OSCE in 2019.
GAZ-66	4x4 off-road military truck	10+	Soviet Union		Observed by the OSCE, mostly used as radio relaying stations.
ZIL-131	Medium cargo truck	20+	Soviet Union		At least 20 were spotted by the OSCE in November 2017.
PTS-2	Amphibious transporter	1+	Soviet Union		

== Artillery ==
=== Mortars ===
Name	Type	Quantity	Origin	Photo	Notes
82-BM-37	82mm infantry mortar	N/A	Soviet Union		At least two reported captured from separatist forces by Ukrainian Forces.
120-PM-43 mortar	120-mm infantry mortar	N/A	Soviet Union		
2S12 Sani	120mm heavy mortar	N/A	Soviet Union		At least two reported captured from separatist forces by Ukrainian Forces.
2B14 Podnos	82mm infantry mortar	N/A	Soviet Union		Captured from Ukrainian forces.
2B9 Vasilek	82mm automatic mortar	N/A	Soviet Union		4-mortar shell cassette.

=== Field artillery ===
Name	Type	Quantity	Origin	Photo	Notes
BS-3	100mm anti-tank gun	1+	Soviet Union		
D-1	152mm howitzer	1	Soviet Union		Reportedly used by 132nd Motor Rifle Brigade (DNR).
D-20	152mm howitzer	2	Soviet Union		Observed by OSCE.
MT-12 Rapira	100mm anti-tank gun	12+	Soviet Union		Observed by OSCE.
D-30 "Lyagushka"	122mm towed howitzer	35+	Soviet Union		Observed by OSCE.
2A36 Giatsint-B	152mm howitzer	2+	Soviet Union		Use documented in videos.
2B16 Nona-K	120mm anti-tank gun	1+	Soviet Union		Ukraine reportedly had only two of these before the war.
2A65 Msta-B	152mm howitzer	6+	Soviet Union		Observed by OSCE.

=== Self-propelled field artillery ===
Name	Type	Quantity	Origin	Photo	Notes
2S1 Gvozdika	122mm self-propelled howitzer	15+	Soviet Union		Observed by OSCE.
2S3 Akatsiya	152.4mm self-propelled artillery	7+	Soviet Union		Observed by OSCE.
2S5 Giatsint-S	152mm self-propelled field gun	1+	Soviet Union		
2S7 Pion	203 mm self-propelled artillery	2+	Soviet Union		Two seen in Makiivka.
2S9 Nona-S	120mm self-propelled mortar	1+	Soviet Union		
2S19 Msta-S	152mm self-propelled howitzer	3+	Soviet Union		Serviceability doubtful. One is suspected to come from Russia.
2S4 Tyulpan	240mm self-propelled mortar	1+	Soviet Union	2S4 Tyulpan in deployed position	One mortar was observed by OSCE in 2015.

=== Rocket artillery ===
Name	Type	Quantity	Origin	Photo	Notes
Cheburashka	Multiple rocket launcher	N/A	Russian Federation / Donetsk People's Republic		First unveiled at 2018 victory parade. Doubts where raised about their local production.
Snezhinka	220mm Multiple rocket launcher	N/A	Russian Federation / Donetsk People's Republic		First unveiled at 2018 victory parade. Doubts where raised about their local production
BM-21 Grad (9K51)	122mm multiple rocket launcher	69	Soviet Union		In 2018 the DPR allegedly had 69 Grads in service.
BM-27 Uragan	220mm multiple rocket launcher	10 (DPR claim)	Soviet Union		Two seen in Khartsyzk in February 2015.
BM-30 Smerch	300mm multiple rocket launcher	5 (DPR claim)	Soviet Union		At least two seen in Makiivka in February 2015.
Grad-P	122mm light portable rocket system	N/A	Soviet Union		Several seen in several Luhansk region areas.
Grad-K ("Grad" on KamAZ-5350 chassis)	122mm multiple rocket launcher	N/A	Russia		The 2B26 machine is a Russian modification of the original BM-21 launcher. It was first produced in 2011. It is seen on a video with separatists firing Grads in January 2015.
TOS-1 Buratino	220mm multiple rocket launcher and thermobaric weapon	6 (DPR claim) (Note: As of the time of writing, they weren't deployed in battle, with their use tightly controlled by the Russian government. (Galeotti 2019, p. 27) As Galeotti puts it: "While the Russians may have provided some to the DNR forces, by all accounts they maintain close control over their use, even withholding the rockets until they are willing to see them deployed." (Galeotti 2019, p. 35))	Russia		Observed in a training area in LPR-controlled Kruhlyk.

== Air Defences ==
=== Towed anti-aircraft gun ===
Name	Type	Quantity	Origin	Photo	Notes
ZU-23-2	23mm anti-aircraft gun	N/A	Soviet Union		Some are mounted on trucks and MT-LBs.
ZPU-2	14.5mm anti-aircraft gun	N/A	Soviet Union		
S-60	57mm anti-aircraft gun	N/A	Soviet Union		

=== Air defense vehicles ===
Name	Type	Quantity	Origin	Photo	Notes
9K33 Osa	6x6 amphibious surface-to-air missile system	1+	Soviet Union		One claimed to be captured from Ukrainian forces in the "southern cauldron".
9K35 Strela-10	Short range surface-to-air missile	3+	Soviet Union		One from the Vostok Battalion was seen near the Donetsk Airport in July 2014 nicknamed "Лягушонок" (frogling). One seen in a Sverdlovsk convoy. Another one spotted by OSCE SMM in 2021 nearl Luhansk.
9K331M Tor-M2	Short range surface-to-air missile	1+	Soviet Union; Russia		
2K22 Tunguska	Short range self-propelled anti-aircraft gun and surface-to-air missile	1+	Soviet Union		
Pantsir-S1	Medium range surface-to-air missile	1+	Soviet Union / Russia		It is not known to have been exported to Ukraine. Seen in Luhansk and Makiivka in early 2015. Its used rocket components were also reported to be observed in Ukraine in November 2014.

=== Man-portable air-defense systems ===
Name	Type	Max. altitude	Origin	Photo	Notes
9K32 Strela-2	Man-portable air-defense system	1500m	Soviet Union		Some Ukrainian stocks of Strela-2s went missing early in the conflict, and are presumably under separatist control.
9K38 Igla	Man-portable air-defense system	3500m	Soviet Union		Supplied by Russia (Ukrainian claim). Captured from Ukrainian armouries (DPR claim). The system has identification friend or foe system which undermines DPR claims.
PPZR Grom	Man-portable air-defense system	3500m	Poland		This Polish weapon was reportedly captured from pro-Russian separatists. It was fitted with a Russian-made 9P516 gripstock, designed for the 9K38 Igla. Russian forces are known to have captured some of these from Georgia.

== Electronic warfare ==
Name	Type	Quantity	Origin	Photo	Notes
R-330Zh Zhitel	Anti-cellular and satellite communications jamming station	1+	Russia		One station spotted by an unmanned aerial vehicle of the OSCE Special Monitoring Mission near Michurine in August 2015 and 11 km south of Donetsk city in June 2016.
RB-341V Leer-3	Anti-GSM reconnaissance and jamming station, with Orlan-10 drones	1+	Russia		Spotted by the OSCE SMM near Chornukhyne, 64 km SW of Luhansk on 28 July 2018. Observed by OSCE in 2020.
R-934B Sinitsa	Jamming station	1+	Russia		Observed by OSCE in 2020.
RB-636 Svet-KU	Radio control and information protection system	1+	Russia		Observed by OSCE in 2020.
1L269 Krasukha-2	Anti-air jamming station	1+	Russia		Spotted by the OSCE SMM near Chornukhyne, 64 km SW of Luhansk on 28 July 2018.
RB-109A Bylina	Brigade-level electronic warfare automated control system	1+	Russia		Spotted by the OSCE SMM near Chornukhyne, 64 km SW of Luhansk on 28 July 2018.
Repellent-1	Anti-drone electronic warfare system	1+	Russia		Spotted by the OSCE SMM near Chornukhyne, 64 km SW of Luhansk on 28 July 2018.
51U6 Kasta-2E1	C-band ultra-high frequency (300 MHz-1 GHz) 2D target acquisition radar designed to acquire the range and heading of small targets flying at low altitudes. Installed on KamAZ-43114 6×6 off-road chassis.	1	Soviet Union / Russia		Observed at a training area near Buhaivka, 37 km southwest of Luhansk by OSCE SMM drone.
P-19 "Danube"	High mobility radar and with the antenna mounted on the single truck	1	Soviet Union		Spotted by the OSCE SMM near Verbova Balka, 28 km south-east of Donetsk on 18 February 2020.

== Aircraft ==
=== Combat jets ===
Name	Type	Quantity	Origin	Photo	Notes
Aero L-29 Delfín	Military trainer aircraft/Light attack aircraft	2+	Czechoslovak Socialist Republic		At least one plane retrofited from Lugansk museum. On 19 January 2015, a LPR militia video showed an Armenian (Aram Avagyan) volunteer test driving an operational L-29 on a runway. In 2018, one L-29 was displayed in Donetsk on Victory Day.

=== Unmanned aerial vehicles ===
Name	Quantity	Origin	Photo	Notes
Eleron-3SV	N/A	Russia		
Forpost (IAI Searcher)	N/A	Israel; Russia		Five unmanned aerial vehicles shot down by Ukrainian forces.
Granat-1	N/A	Russia		
Granat-2	N/A	Russia		
Granat-4	N/A	Russia		
Navodchik-2	N/A	Russia		Ground control station
Orlan-10	6+	Russia		Four shot down by Ukrainian forces in 2014 and one in 2016. Another one crashed on Ukrainian territory in 2017. On 13 May 2017 the OSCE Special Monitoring Mission saw an Orlan-10 flying over the road from Makiivka (12 km north-east of Donetsk) to Donetsk city.
Takhion	N/A	Russia		
Zala 421-04M	N/A	Russia		
Zastava (IAI Bird-Eye 400)	N/A	Israel; Russia		
Unknown unmanned aerial vehicle number 2166	N/A	Russia		
Unknown unmanned aerial vehicle number 2207	N/A	Russia		
Non-military unmanned aerial vehicle	N/A	China		Quadcopters, fixed-wing drones. One used by the rebels during the Second Battle of Donetsk Airport.

== Ships ==
Name	Type	Quantity	Origin	Photo	Notes
	Motorboat	25			Used by 9th Regiment of the Marine Corps in Sea of Azov.

== See also ==
- List of Russo-Ukrainian conflict military equipment
- List of equipment of the Russian Ground Forces

== Bibliography ==
- Galeotti, Mark (27 June 2019). Armies of Russia's War in Ukraine. Bloomsbury Publishing. ISBN 978-1-4728-3345-7.
