= List of military equipment used by UMkhonto we Sizwe =

In the early years of its armed resistance campaign, the African National Congress and its armed wing, uMkhonto we Sizwe (MK), used whatever arms and war materiel it could lay its hands on. ANC members in exile became adept at building home-made explosives, including time bombs, from materials the movement could acquire from commercial sources. According to Nelson Mandela, as early as 1953 the ANC began sending delegations abroad to petition sympathetic governments for military aid. From the early 1960s, the ANC became more influenced by the South African Communist Party (SACP), which enjoyed close political ties to the Soviet Union. Following the SACP and ANC's formation of MK in 1961, SACP members such as Arthur Goldreich made several tours of the Soviet Union and Warsaw Pact member states to solicit military aid. Beginning in 1963, the Soviet Union became the largest contributor of war materiel and arms to MK. It supplied an estimated 36 million rubles' worth of military equipment to MK from 1963 to 1990, including pistols, rifles, machine guns, grenade launchers, and ammunition. By 1982 an estimated 90% of MK's equipment was of Soviet origin. The remainder came from other Warsaw Pact member states or sympathetic revolutionary movements; for example, MK received ex-Portuguese Uzi and Sterling submachine guns from the People's Armed Forces of Liberation of Angola (FAPLA) during the mid-1970s. The People's Liberation Army of Namibia (PLAN) also donated some arms and ammunition to MK. MK used these weapons during its economic sabotage activities inside South Africa, as well as in semi-conventional military operations in Angola and elsewhere.

MK cadres were frequently sent to the Soviet Union, and to a lesser extent East Germany, to receive military training on these weapons abroad. However, the Soviet Union, East Germany, and Cuba also sent military instructors to help train MK cadres in friendly African nations where the ANC operated in exile, such as Angola, Tanzania, Uganda, and Ethiopia. MK stored most of its equipment in large arms depots located in neighbouring states around South Africa, and operated various smuggling routes to bring this materiel to its domestic insurgent cells. The materiel was smuggled across the border in small quantities and then mostly cached in major urban centers where the ANC had a large and active political following.

Although the MK was never able to achieve parity in conventional weapons with the South African security forces, by the early 1990s it had stockpiled enough small arms inside the country to mount a determined guerrilla campaign indefinitely. The small arms most commonly carried by MK insurgents included TT-33 and Makarov pistols, Škorpion vz. 61 submachine guns, and Kalashnikov-pattern assault rifles. The pistols and Škorpions were always issued in much larger numbers to MK recruits than rifles, as they were considered more suitable for hit-and-run attacks and assassinations, and discouraged prolonged firefights in which the insurgents would always be at a disadvantage. During the final years of its struggle, MK complemented these weapons with Stechkin automatic pistols. In its early operations, MK also favoured the Uzi submachine gun, a number of which were recovered from its arms caches during the late 1960s. It was later superseded by the Škorpion, although MK recruits continued to be trained on the Uzi as late as 1977. The MK leadership consistently displayed a preference for compact, easily concealable weapons with more firepower than semi-automatic pistols but less cumbersome than full-sized rifles.

MK amassed one of southern Africa's largest stockpiles of land mines held by a non-state entity, consisting of over 19,000 anti-tank mines, 13,000 anti-personnel mines, and 5,000 limpet mines. An air defence regiment was formed in the late 1970s under the guidance of Cuban instructors. This unit was to provide security for external MK base camps that might be targeted by South African air raids, and was equipped with ZPU-1 anti-aircraft guns and Strela-2 (SA-7) surface-to-air missiles.

After the end of apartheid, MK surrendered oversight of its depots and equipment to the newly constituted South African National Defence Force (SANDF).

== Small arms ==
Model	Image	Origin	Type	Calibre	Notes
Pistols
TT-33		Soviet Union	Pistol	7.62x25mm	
Makarov PM		Soviet Union	Pistol	9x18mm	
Stechkin APS		Soviet Union	Machine pistol	9x18mm	
Submachine guns
PPSH-41		Soviet Union	Submachine gun	7.62x25mm	Recovered from MK caches in Mozambique.
Sa vz. 25		Czechoslovakia	Submachine gun	9x19mm	
Škorpion Vz. 61		Czechoslovakia	Submachine gun	.32 ACP	Possibly up to 2,000 delivered by Czechoslovakia.
Sterling		United Kingdom	Submachine gun	9x19mm	
Uzi		Israel	Submachine gun	9x19mm	Recovered from MK arms caches in Rhodesia.
Rifles
SKS		Soviet Union	Semi-automatic rifle	7.62x39mm	3,362 delivered by the Soviet Union.
AK-47		Soviet Union	Assault rifle	7.62x39mm	"Several thousand" delivered by the Soviet Union.
AKM		Soviet Union	Assault rifle	7.62x39mm	Issued to some MK cadres by the late 1980s.
PM md. 63		Romania	Assault rifle	7.62x39mm	Recovered from MK arms caches in Mozambique.
Dragunov SVD		Soviet Union	Precision rifle	7.62×54mmR	
Machine guns
RPD		Soviet Union	Light machine gun	7.62x39mm	Recovered from MK caches in Mozambique.
RPK		Soviet Union	Light machine gun	7.62x39mm	Recovered from MK caches in Mozambique.
RP-46		Soviet Union	Light machine gun	7.62×54mmR	
PK		Soviet Union	Medium machine gun	7.62×54mmR	Recovered from MK caches in Mozambique.
Portable anti-tank weapons
RPG-7		Soviet Union	Rocket-propelled grenade	85mm	
9M14 Malyutka		Soviet Union	Anti-tank guided missile	125mm	20 delivered by the Soviet Union.

== Grenades and explosives ==
Model	Image	Origin	Type	Notes
F1		Soviet Union	Hand grenade	
RG-42		Soviet Union	Hand grenade	
RGD-5		Soviet Union	Hand grenade	
TM-57		Soviet Union	Anti-tank mine	Some recovered from an MK cache in Umgababa in 1985.
MPM/Type 158		Soviet Union	Limpet mine	

== Light artillery and air defence ==
Model	Image	Origin	Type	Calibre	Notes
Artillery
9P132 Grad-P		Soviet Union	Rocket launcher	122mm	90 delivered by the Soviet Union.
B-10		Soviet Union	Recoilless rifle	82mm	Used to guard external training camps.
B-11		Soviet Union	Recoilless rifle	107mm	
ZPU-1		Soviet Union	Anti-aircraft gun	14.5mm	
9K32 Strela-2		Soviet Union	Shoulder-launched surface-to-air missile	72mm	Over 40 delivered by the Soviet Union.
