= Granat RGO-88 =

RGO-88
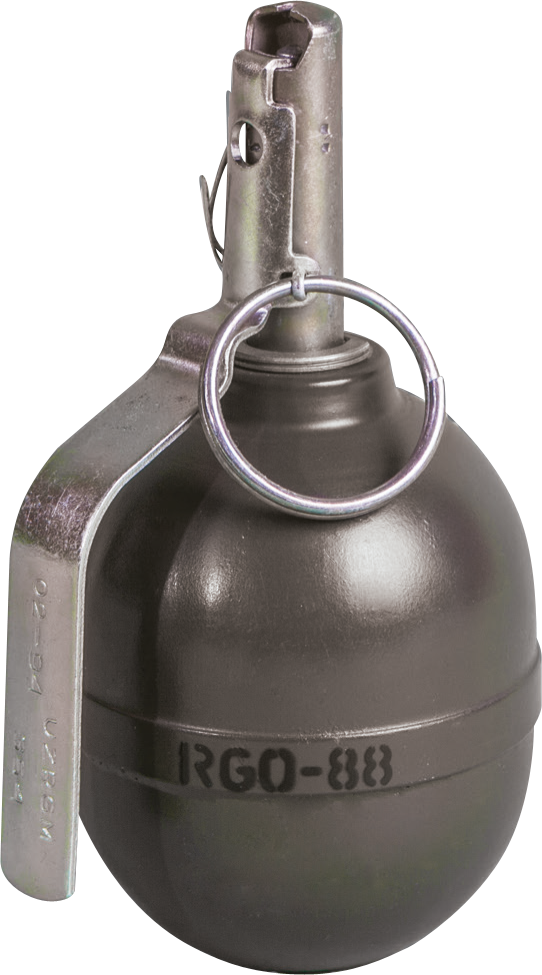
- Type: Hand grenade
- Place of origin: Poland

Service history
- In service: 1988-present

Production history
- Designer: Military Institute of Armament Technology
- Designed: 1988
- Manufacturer: Zakłady Metalowe „Dezamet”

Specifications
- Mass: 485 g
- Height: 114 mm
- Diameter: 57 mm
- Filling: Hexogen
- Filling weight: 60 g
- Detonation mechanism: Time delay fuse 3.2 to 4 s

The RGO-88 grenade (Polish: Granat RGO-88, lit. 'Grenade RGO-88') is a Polish anti-personnel fragmentation grenade, designed in the late 1980s.

== History ==
In the second half of the 1980s, work began in Poland on a new defensive grenade – a successor to the F-1 grenade.

The RGO-88 grenades is manufactured by Zakłady Metalowe Dezamet in Nowa Dęba.

== Description ==
The RGO-88 grenade is a defensive grenade.

The new grenade was to be much more effective for a similar weight. Compared to the F-1 grenade, it was possible to achieve three times greater effectiveness in the striking area with a smaller weight.

A major advantage associated with the use of prefabricated striking elements is the assurance of complete safety for the thrower (the striking range is smaller than the throw range).

The main element is a plastic body (similar to the Soviet RGD-5) with embedded steel balls, constituting striking elements. Inside the body is an explosive, hexogen.

The body is covered from the outside with a thin steel sheet casing. In the upper part of the body is the UZGR or UZRGM fuse socket.

The grenades are packed in wooden boxes, 20 pieces in a box measuring 517 × 305 × 150 and weighing 16 kg, and the fuses for them, 10 pieces in metal boxes, hermetically sealed.

== Users ==
- Poland
  - Polish Armed Forces

== See also ==
- RGZ-89
- RGD-5
- M67 hand grenade
- Offensive grenade wz. 24
- Defensive grenade wz. 33
