= RGO (disambiguation) =

RGO may refer to:

== Organisations ==
- Rada Główna Opiekuńcza (Central Welfare Council), a Polish social organization during the German occupation of WWI and WWII
- Revolutionäre Gewerkschafts Opposition (Revolutionary Union Opposition), a Communist trade union during Germany's Weimar Republic
- Russkoye Geograficheskoye Obshchestvo (Russian Geographical Society), a Russian scholarly association

== Places ==
- Royal Greenwich Observatory (now Royal Observatory, Greenwich), Greenwich Park, London, England
- Orang Airport, North Hamgyong Province, North Korea (by IATA code)

== Technology ==
- Reciprocating gait orthosis, a type of leg brace
- Reduced graphene oxide, a form of graphene
- Ruchnaya Granata Oboronitel'naya (Hand Grenade Defensive), a Soviet weapon
