= Model 1914 grenade =

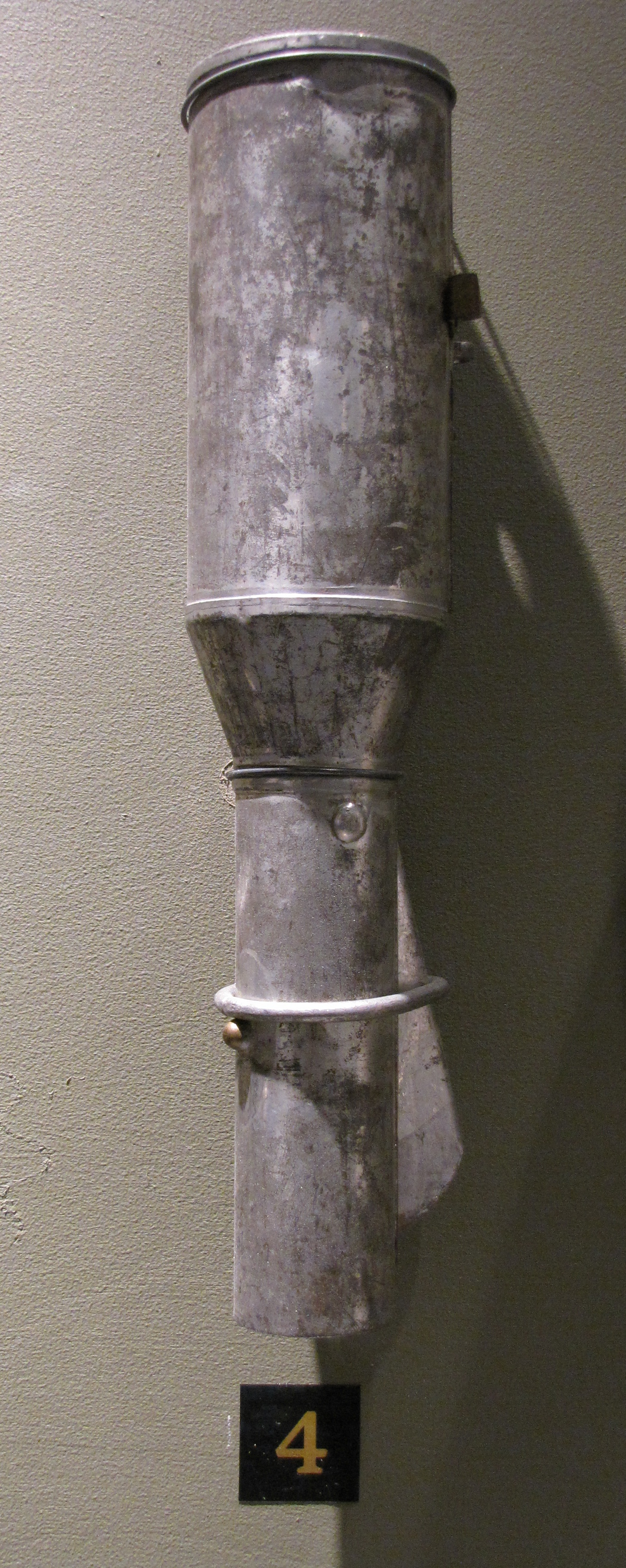
- Russian model 1914 stick hand grenade
- Type: Hand grenade
- Place of origin: Russian Empire

Service history
- In service: 1914–1980
- Used by: Russian Empire; Soviet Union; Nazi Germany (Captured)
- Wars: World War I Russian Civil War; World War II

Production history
- Designer: Vladimir Rdultovsky
- Designed: 1914
- Produced: 1914–?
- Variants: M1914/30 (different explosive), M1917 (chemical grenade based on M1914's design)

Specifications
- Mass: 500 g (M1914), 590 g (M1914/30), 780g with fragmentation sleeve
- Length: 235 mm
- Diameter: 45 mm
- Filling: Picric acid (M1914), TNT (M1914/30)
- Detonation mechanism: Time-fuse, 4-5 seconds

The Model 1914 grenade (Russian: Ручная граната образца 1914 года, romanized: Ruchnaya granata obraztsa 1914 goda, lit. 'Hand Grenade Pattern of year 1914') is a Russian stick concussion grenade (fragmentation grenade via an optional jacket) that was used during World War I and World War II.

== Operation ==
Model 1914 grenade

The M1914 is a time-delayed grenade. To activate it, the user must hold the grenade with the safety pin between two fingers, move the safety catch so that it is away from the hammer's front, then throw it. The safety pin is released as soon as the grenade is thrown.

== History ==
=== Origins ===
The M1914 is a heavily modified Model 1912 grenade. The head of the grenade went from a box to a cylinder, the wooden handle was removed in favor of a welded sheet of metal and the belt hook was removed.

=== World War I ===
The M1914 was one of the few grenades used in the conflict that was in service before the war started. It was used throughout the war, along with the Stender grenade, by Russian forces until Russia withdrew from the conflict on March 8, 1918.

=== Inter-war ===
In 1930, the M1914 was modified to use a different explosive, TNT. TNT was a common explosive in Soviet grenades at the time, as seen in grenades such as the F-1 grenade and RGD-33 grenade.

=== World War II ===
The M1914/30 also saw use in World War II, but it was eventually replaced by the RGD-33 grenade as the Red Army's primary stick grenade. The Axis forces used captured M1914/30 grenades, which they classified as the HG 336(r), or Handgranate 336 (russische).

=== Post-World War II ===
After World War II, the M1914 was completely retired in favor of other designs, such as the RGD-5 grenade. However, inert versions of the M1914 were used for training up until the 1980s.

== Variants ==
=== M1914/30 ===
The M1914/30 is a variant of the M1914 that uses TNT instead of picric acid. Otherwise, it is exactly the same as the M1914.

=== M1917 Chemical ===
The M1917 is a modified and larger M1914 that expels chemical gas when it bursts. The primary chemical agent in this grenade is 500 g of chloropicrin, which is an irritant and choking agent. The M1917 can be told apart from the M1914 because it is larger than the M1914 and has a skull and crossbones on it with the Russian word for chemical underneath the image.

=== Fragmentation Sleeve ===
The M1914 has an optional fragmentation sleeve that turns the M1914 into a fragmentation grenade. The sleeve's pattern was later used on the RGD-33 grenade's fragmentation sleeve.

== See also ==
- List of Russian weaponry

== Sources ==
- А. А. Благонравов, М. В. Гуревич. Боеприпасы стрелкового вооружения. Патроны, ручные и ружейные гранаты. Их устройство. Ленинград, издание военно-технической академии РККА имени тов. Дзержинского, 1932. - 210 стр.
