= RGN hand grenade =

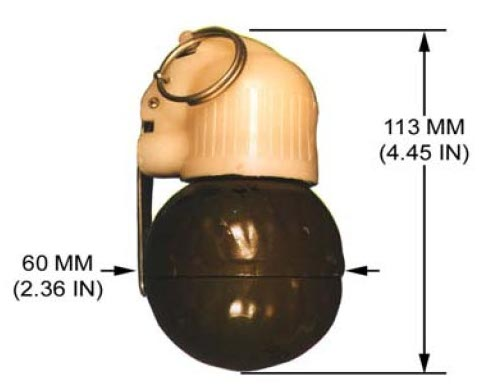
- RGN hand grenade
- Type: Hand grenade
- Place of origin: Soviet Union

Service history
- Used by: See Users
- Wars: Soviet–Afghan War; Russo-Ukrainian War

Specifications
- Mass: 310 grams (11 oz) (Note: 290 g (10 oz), according to Jane's)
- Length: 113.5 millimetres (4.47 in) (Note: 114 mm (4.5 in), according to Rottman)
- Diameter: 61 millimetres (2.4 in) (Note: 60 mm (2.4 in), according to Rottman)
- Filling: A-IX-1 (96% RDX phlegmatized with 4% wax)
- Filling weight: 97 g (3.4 oz)
- Detonation mechanism: UDZS Impact fuze arming after 1 to 1.8 seconds or time delay after 3.5 to 4 seconds.

The RGN hand grenade (Russian: Ручная Граната Наступательная, romanized: Ruchnaya Granata Nastupatel'naya, lit. 'Hand Grenade Offensive') is an offensive Soviet blast hand grenade introduced during the Soviet–Afghan War alongside the RGO to replace the earlier F-1, RG-42, and RGD-5 hand grenades which proved to be inadequate in the mountainous terrain of Afghanistan.

== Design ==
It consists of a smooth spherical aluminium body, internally scored to generate fragments upon detonation. Externally, the RGN is similar to the RGO hand grenade and shares the same UDZS fuze.

The UDZS fuze has both impact and time delay functions, the impact fuze arms after a pyrotechnic delay of 1 to 1.8 seconds. If the grenade strikes an object after this time a spherical lead shot filled impact weight will trigger detonation. If the grenade has not struck anything after 3.5 to 4 seconds the second pyrotechnic delay will detonate the grenade, allowing the grenade to cause an airburst over a target area if necessary.

The impact fuze detonates when it hits any kind of terrain, including sand, snow, or water. The RGN detonates reliably under extreme temperatures between −50–50 °C (−58–122 °F).

The grenade contains 97 grams (3.4 oz) of A-IX-1 (a mixture of 96% of RDX and 4% of wax) explosive; it has a stated lethal radius of 4 metres (13 ft) (Note: 8 m (26 ft), according to Jane's) to a maximum of 10 m (33 ft), and a safety radius of 25 m (82 ft).

According to Jane's, the grenade can be thrown to a distance of approximately 30–40 m (33–44 yd), while Russian sources gives an approximate throwing range of 40–50 m (44–55 yd).

== History ==
The RGN and RGO grenades were introduced mid 1980s, during the Soviet–Afghan War to replace the F-1, RG-42 and RGD-5 hand grenades. During combat in the mountains, Soviet troops found out that their grenades were less effective: the steep terrain often caused grenades to accidentally bounce or roll back towards the thrower's position and cause friendly casualties, while their long fuse time allowed the enemy forces to get under cover.

The time delay mechanism in the impact fuze acts as a safety, preventing friendly casualties if it impacts too soon, while the time fuze will air-burst over an enemy under cover if it hadn't impacted after 3.5 to 4 seconds.

During the war in Donbas, Ukrainian forces and pro-Russian militias from the Donetsk People's Republic and Luhansk People's Republic both made use of RGN grenades. A photo shared by the insurgents in Russian social media seems to indicate they employed unmanned aerial vehicles modified to drop RGN or RGO grenades on Ukrainian positions.

The grenade is currently in production in Russia and Ukraine, and is in service with a number of other countries. Bulgaria also produces a close copy of the RGN.

== Users ==
=== Current ===
- Bulgaria − Locally produced copies
- Russia
- Ukraine − Produced locally

=== Former ===
- Iraq
- Russian separatist forces in Ukraine
- Soviet Union

== See also ==
- List of Russian weaponry
- RGO hand grenade
- V40 Mini-Grenade

== Bibliography ==
- Ferguson, Jonathan; Jenzen-Jones, N.R. (2014). Raising Red Flags: An Examination of Arms & Munitions in the Ongoing Conflict in Ukraine, 2014 (PDF) (Report). Australia: Armament Research Services (ARES). ISBN 978-0-9924624-3-7. Archived from the original (PDF) on 4 April 2023.
- Jones, Richard D; Ness, Leland S, eds. (2010). Jane's Infantry Weapons 2010-2011. Jane's Information Group. ISBN 978-0-7106-2908-1.
- Rottman, Gordon L. (2015). The Hand Grenade. Bloomsbury Publishing. ISBN 978-1-4728-0735-9.
- Russian General Staff (2002). Grau, Lester W; Gress, Michael A. (eds.). The Soviet-Afghan War: How a Superpower Fought and Lost. University Press of Kansas. ISBN 978-0-7006-1185-0.
