= RGZ-89 grenade =

RGZ-89
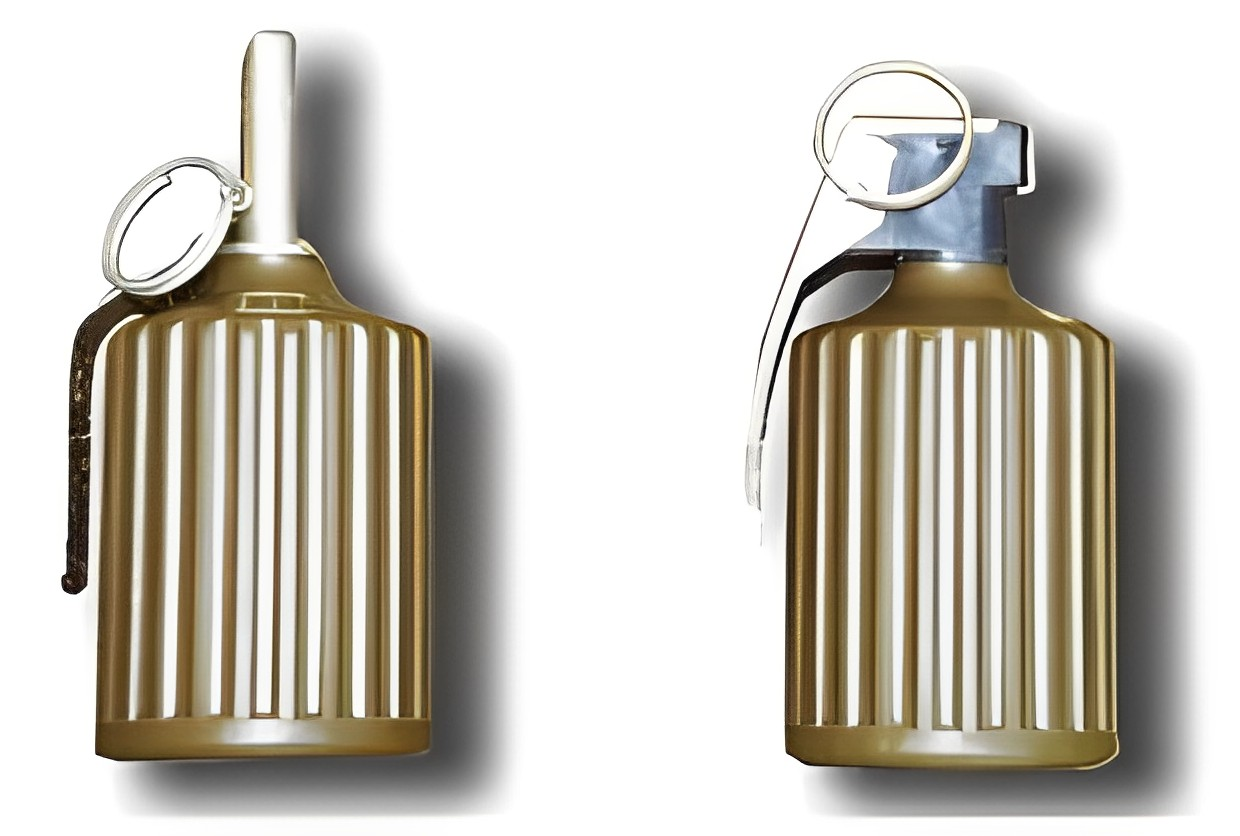
- Type: Anti-personnel grenade
- Place of origin: Poland

Service history
- In service: 1995 - Present
- Wars: Ukrainian-Russian War

Production history
- Designer: Military Institute of Armament Technology
- Designed: 1987-1992
- Manufacturer: Dezamet

Specifications
- Mass: 380 g
- Length: 115 mm
- Diameter: 58 mm
- Filling: Hexogen
- Filling weight: 110 g
- Detonation mechanism: Timed (2,8-3,2 seconds)

The RGZ-89 (Polish: Ręczny Granat Zaczepny wz. 89, lit. 'Offensive Hand Grenade Model 89') is a modern Polish grenade produced in Zakłady Mechaniczne "Dezamet".

== History ==
In 1987, the Department of Design and Operation of Classical Armaments (currently the Military Institute of Armament Technology) of the Military University of Technology began work on a new grenade to replace the RG-42 grenades.

The new grenade was to be more effective and at the same time easier and cheaper to produce (the RG-42 grenade originated from the Second World War and was characterized by a complicated production technology). It was also required that the fragments of the new grenade, while being highly effective at hitting the target, would not pose a threat to the throwing soldier.

Work began in 1989. The design team consisted of S. Ciepielski, S. Derecki, Z. Jopek, S. Majewski, J. Szymański and E. Włodarczyk.

Initial theoretical calculations were carried out as part of the master's thesis by Second Lieutenant Jacek Walczewski (whose supervisor was Colonel Dr. Eng. Sylwester Majewski, a member of the design team).

After testing several versions of the grenade, the designers decided on a grenade with a plastic body and a fragmentation insert in the form of a spiral duralumin wire. The design work was completed in 1992.

In 1995, the production of the grenade commenced by Zakłady Metalowe Dezamet in Nowa Dęba.

== Description ==
The RGZ-89 grenade is an offensive grenade. The main element is the body (made of plastic) containing a fragmentation insert in the form of a spirally wound wire with a rectangular cross-section (cuts on the inner side of the spiral force the insert to fragment). Inside the body there is an explosive (hexogen). The body is closed at the bottom with a bottom. The body is corrugated on the outside. In the upper part of the body there is a socket for the UZRG or UZRGM fuse.

== Users ==
- Poland
- Ukraine

== See also ==
- Granat RGO-88
- Offensive grenade wz. 24
- Defensive grenade wz. 33
