= RGO hand grenade =

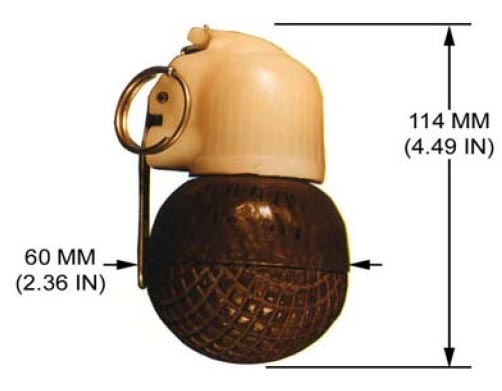
- RGO hand grenade
- Type: Hand grenade
- Place of origin: Soviet Union

Service history
- Used by: See Users
- Wars: Soviet–Afghan War; Russo-Ukrainian War

Specifications
- Mass: 520–530 g (18–19 oz)
- Length: 114 mm (4.5 in) (Note: 114.5 mm (4.51 in), according to Jane's)
- Diameter: 60 mm (2.4 in) (Note: 61 mm (2.4 in), according to Jane's)
- Filling: A-IX-1 (96% RDX phlegmatized with 4% wax)
- Filling weight: 90 g (3.2 oz)
- Detonation mechanism: UDZS Impact fuze arming after 1 to 1.8 seconds or time delay after 3.2 to 4.2 seconds.

The RGO hand grenade (Russian: Ручная Граната Оборонительная, romanized: Ruchnaya Granata Oboronitel'naya, lit. 'Hand Grenade Defensive') is a defensive Soviet fragmentation hand grenade introduced mid 1980s alongside the RGN during the Soviet–Afghan War to replace the earlier F-1, RG-42, and RGD-5 hand grenades, which proved to be inadequate in the mountains of Afghanistan.

== Design ==
It consists of a double layered steel pre-fragmented body. Unlike the two-part hemispherical RGN, the RGO is made up of 4 quadrants: the upper hemispheres are internally segmented to provide fragmentation and are covered by a smooth exterior, while the lower hemispheres are segmented in a diamond-pattern cross-hatching in the outer shell that provides additional fragmentation.

It uses the UDZS dual action fuze (also used on the RGN), which has both impact and time delay functions. The impact fuze arms after a pyrotechnic delay of 1 to 1.8 seconds. If the impact fuze has not triggered the grenade after 3.2 to 4.2 seconds a second pyrotechnic delay triggers the grenade, allowing this grenade to be thrown to produce an airburst over a target area, if necessary. The RGO is designed to detonate when it hits any kind of terrain including sand, snow, or water. It also works reliably under extreme temperatures ranging from −50–50 °C (−58–122 °F).

The RGO contains 90 grams (3.2 oz) of A-IX-1 (96% RDX and 4% wax) explosive. The fragments produced by the grenade upon detonation generate a lethal radius of between 6 metres (20 ft) and 20 m (66 ft). The RGO is capable of spreading fragments to a radius of 100 m (330 ft) from the point of detonation.

According to Jane's, the grenade can be thrown to a distance of 30–40 m (33–44 yd), while Russian sources gives a throwing distance of 40–50 m (44–55 yd).

== History ==
The RGN and RGO grenades were introduced mid 1980s, during the Soviet–Afghan War to replace the F-1, RG-42, and RGD-5. In the mountains of Afghanistan, Soviet troops found out that their grenades were less effective: The steep terrain often caused grenades to accidentally bounce or roll back towards the thrower's position and cause friendly casualties. The long fuse time allowed the enemy forces to get under cover.

The RGO's time delay in the impact fuze prevents friendly casualties if it impacts too soon, while the timed fuze allowed it to air-burst over an enemy under cover if it hadn't impacted.

In 2014, during the war in Donbas, the pro-Russian separatists shared a photo on Russian social media suggesting they employed unmanned aerial vehicles modified to drop RGN or RGO grenades on Ukrainian positions.

The grenade is still in production in Russia and Ukraine and is in service with a number of countries. Bulgaria produces a close copy of the RGO.

== Users ==
=== Current ===
- Bulgaria − Locally produced copies
- Russia
- Ukraine − Produced locally

=== Former ===
- Iraq
- Soviet Union

== See also ==
- List of Russian weaponry
- RGN hand grenade

== Bibliography ==
- Ferguson, Jonathan; Jenzen-Jones, N.R. (2014). Raising Red Flags: An Examination of Arms & Munitions in the Ongoing Conflict in Ukraine, 2014 (PDF) (Report). Australia: Armament Research Services (ARES). ISBN 978-0-9924624-3-7. Archived from the original (PDF) on 2023-04-04.
- Jones, Richard D; Ness, Leland S, eds. (2010). Jane's Infantry Weapons 2010-2011. Jane's Information Group. ISBN 978-0-7106-2908-1.
- Rottman, Gordon L. (2015). The Hand Grenade. Bloomsbury Publishing. ISBN 978-1-4728-0735-9.
- Russian General Staff (2002). Grau, Lester W; Gress, Michael A. (eds.). The Soviet-Afghan War: How a Superpower Fought and Lost. University Press of Kansas. ISBN 978-0-7006-1185-0.
