= V40 =

V40 may refer to:

== Automobiles ==
- Nissan Quest (V40), a minivan
- Toyota Camry (V40), a sedan
- Volvo V40 (1995-2004), a station wagon
- Volvo V40 (2012–2019), a hatchback

== Other uses ==
- LFG V 40, a German sport aircraft
- LG V40 ThinQ, a smartphone
- MÁV Class V40, a locomotive
- V40 Mini-Grenade, a Dutch fragmentation grenade
- Vanadium-40, an isotope of vanadium
