= RGD-33 grenade =

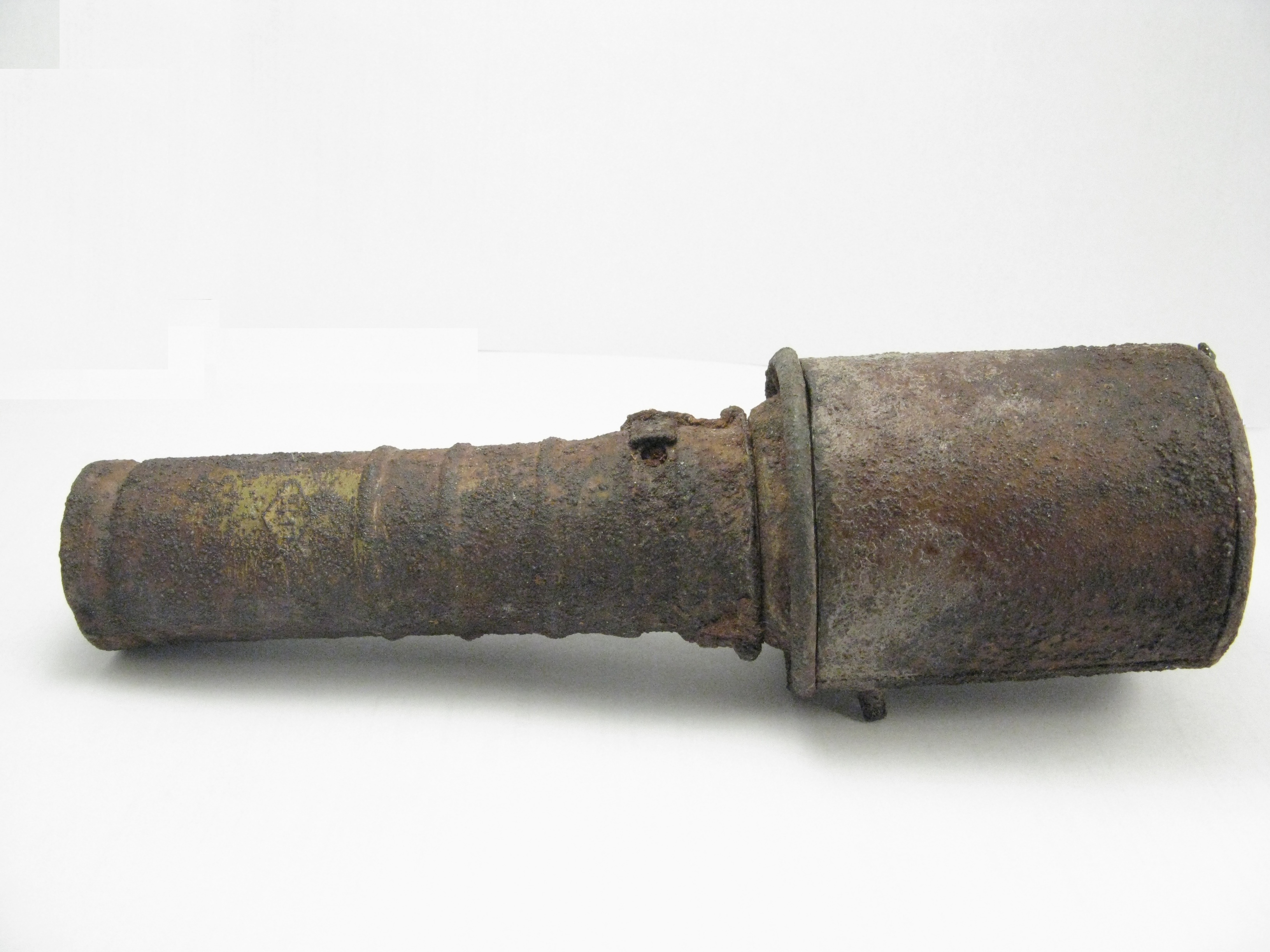
- RGD-33 grenade in a museum
- Type: Hand grenade
- Place of origin: Soviet Union

Service history
- Used by: See Users
- Wars: World War II; Korean War; First Indochina War; Vietnam War

Production history
- Designed: 1933
- Produced: 1933−1942

Specifications
- Mass: 500 g (18 oz) (Note: 750 g (26 oz) with the normal fragmentation sleeve, and 625 g (22.0 oz) with a lightened sleeve)
- Length: 190 mm (7.5 in)
- Diameter: 45 mm (1.8 in), 54 mm (2.1 in) with fragmentation sleeve
- Filling: TNT
- Filling weight: 85 g (3.0 oz)
- Detonation mechanism: Time-fuse, 3.2–3.8 seconds

The RGD-33 (Russian: Ручная Граната Дьяконова образца 33 года, romanized: Ruchnaya Granata Dyakonova obraztsa 33 goda, lit. 'Hand Grenade, Dyakonov design, pattern year 1933') is a Soviet dual use (offensive and defensive) stick grenade developed in 1933.

Designed to replace the RG-14/30 which was an improved World War I vintage design, the RGD-33 proved to be overly complex to operate (especially in the hands of hastily trained conscripts), and too complex to easily produce during the Great Patriotic War. It was replaced in service with a simpler design, the RG-42, though it remained in service with naval infantry units for the remainder of the war.

In the post-war period, despite being obsolete in the USSR, the RGD-33 would continue to see use in Korea and Vietnam.

== Design ==
The grenade replaced the RG-14/30, which was a World War I vintage design with an improved arming system. The RGD-33 is composed of four separate pieces: a cylindrical head containing 85 grams (3.0 oz) of TNT filling, a fragmentation sleeve that was only used when thrown under the protection of a trench or cover, the throwing handle which contains the igniter, and the fuse.

The grenade was distributed to troops in both assembled and disassembled (head separated from the handle) forms; riflemen carried the assembled grenades and fuses separately in a grenade pouch. Each fuse was wrapped separately in paper or cloth and stored in special pockets of the pouch. Before use the fuse is inserted into the grenade head.

Described by Rottman as "the most complex grenade to operate," the RGD-33 was too complicated to handle, specially in the hands of poorly educated peasant conscripts under the stress of combat situations.

Before arming, a safety switch on the outer handle must be released by flipping it to the left unlocking the inner and outer handles; the inner handle remains fixed and the outer handle rotates. The operator then grasps the warhead with their offhand and grips the handle with their throwing hand. The handle is then pulled back, rotated clockwise to the right and pushed in; a red dot will appear in the window to indicate it was now cocked. The safety is now moved to the right to cover the red dot in the cutout, making it safe. The cover on the top of the grenade head was opened, the fuse inserted and the cover closed; it is disarmed by pushing the catch open, causing the fuze to pop out and be retrieved.

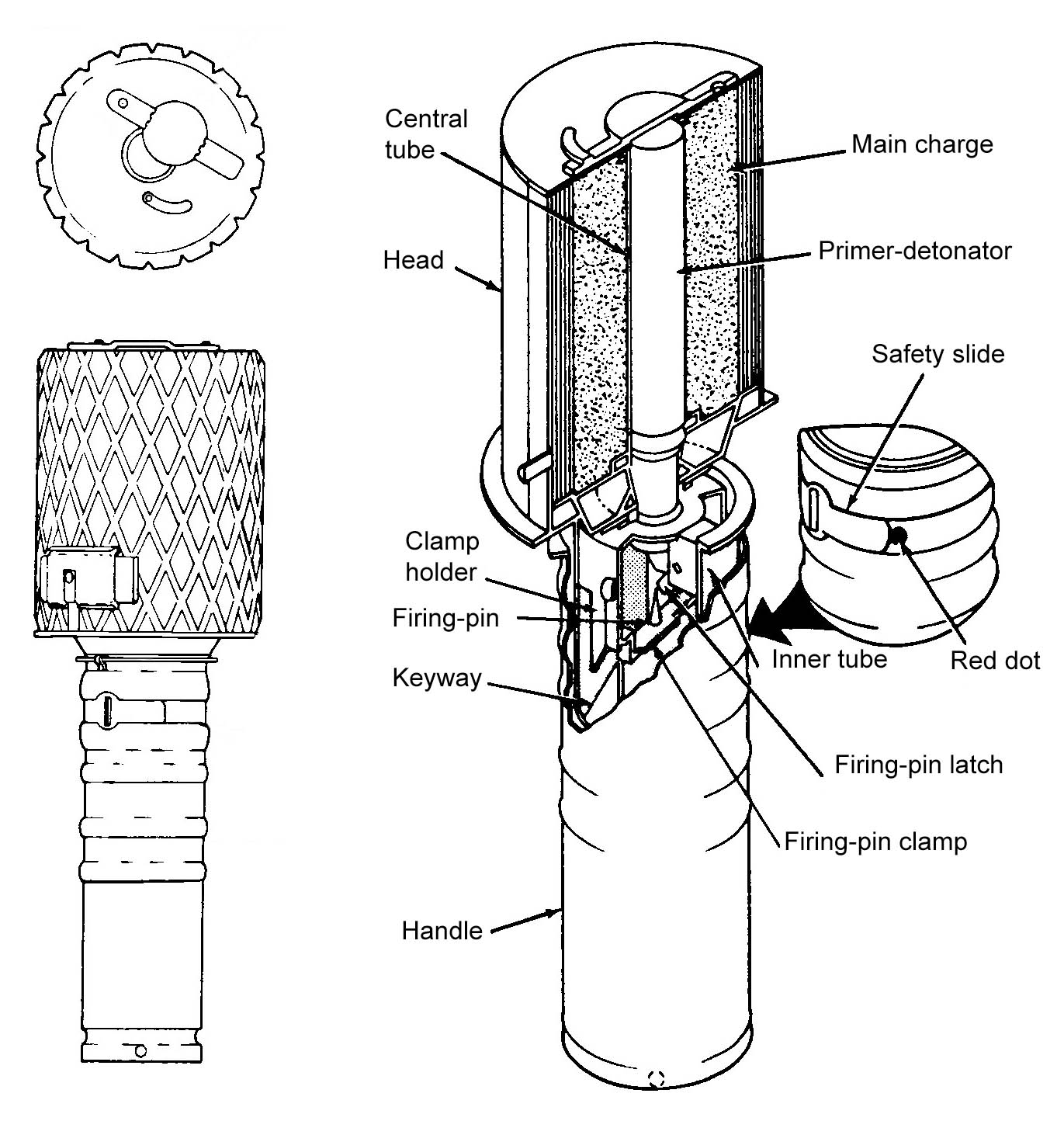
A diagram of a RGD-33, with a fragmentation sleeve fitted and a cutaway.

The operator arms the fuze by flipping the switch to the left, exposing the red dot. The operator then throws the grenade. The forward momentum activated the igniter mechanism in the handle, beginning the 3.2−3.8 seconds delay. According to Soviet Army manuals, the RDG-33 had a throwing range of approximately 30–40 m (33–44 yd).

While such a complex procedure prevented enemy soldiers unfamiliar with the unusual arming mechanism from immediately making use of captured grenades, its complexity combined with the cost and production time resulted in the RDG-33 falling out of use in the early stages of the Great Patriotic War, though it remained in use with the Naval Infantry.

The RGD-33 featured a separate metal fragmentation sleeve pre-notched in a diamond pattern, it was firmly held in place with a latch engaging the pin on the grenade body. Upon the grenade's detonation, the sleeve would spread fragments up to a radius of 100 metres (330 ft).

Without the fragmentation sleeve, the grenade had an effective lethal radius of 5 metres (16 ft), making it suitable for offensive operations. When the sleeve was attached for defensive operations, the grenade had an effective lethal radius of 25 metres (82 ft).

=== Vietnamese copies ===
During the First Indochina War, the North Vietnamese used crude copies of the RGD-33; these copies had a metal safety cap on the bottom of the handle. Before use, the cap was unscrewed revealing a ceramic bead tied to a pull cord. Once it was pulled, the cord activated a friction time fuse. These grenades produced little fragmentation upon detonation, making them well suited for close-up assaults.

== History ==
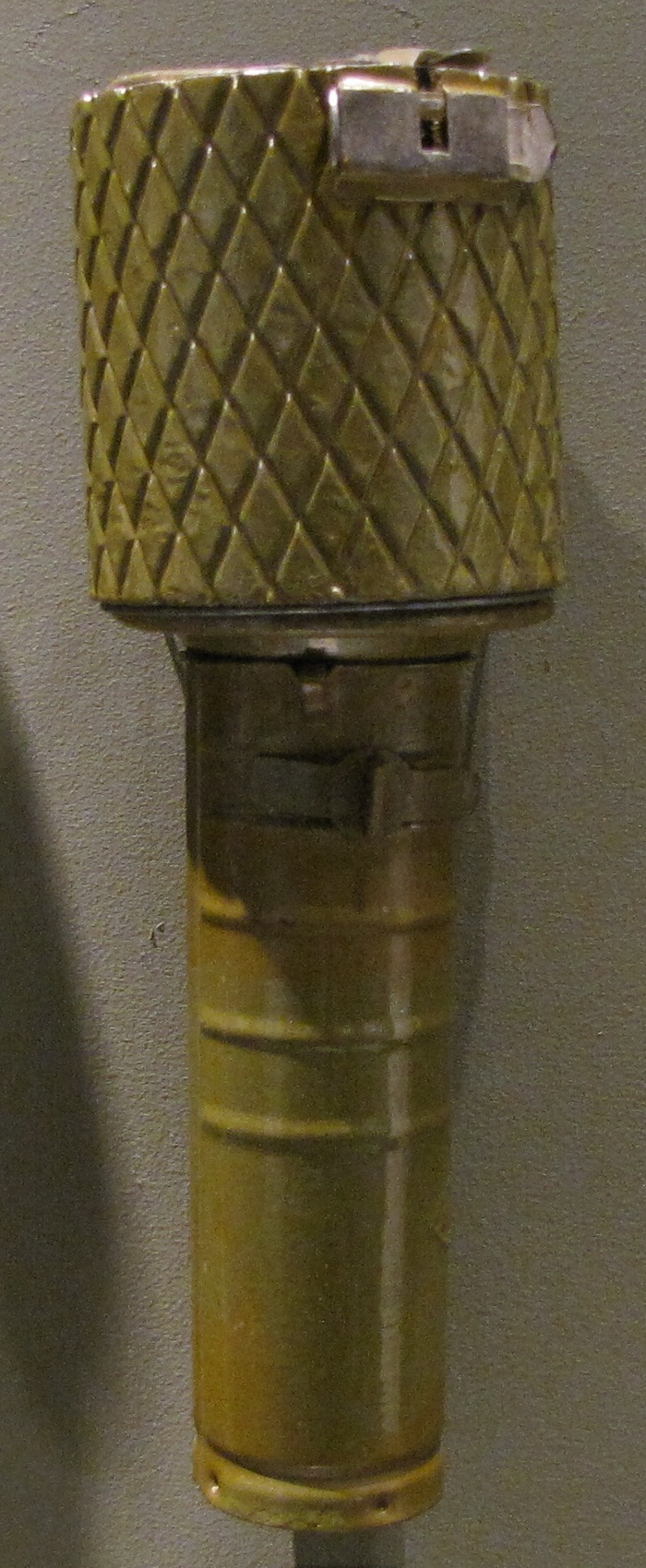
RGD-33 with the fragmentation jacket

Soviet scout of the 412th Rifle Regiment, 1st Rifle Division with four RGD-33 grenades in August 1942

At the beginning of World War II, the Soviet Union used the RG-14/30 in limited numbers alongside the F-1 grenade, and the RGD-33. Due the latter cost and complexity to manufacture, it was replaced with the much simpler RG-42, though the RGD-33 remained in service for the rest of the war with Naval Infantry units.

In the Eastern Front, German forces supplemented their own grenades with captured and confiscated Soviet grenades including the RGD-33, though they needed to be trained on how to operate it first.

According to the memoirs of former Russian president Boris Yeltsin, at age 11 (during wartime) he took two live RGD-33 grenades from an abandoned arms depot to disassemble them and learn what was inside. After hitting one of the grenades with a hammer, he lost some fingers of his left hand following the explosion. (Note: Yeltsin lost his left thumb and index fingers, which had to be amputated in the hospital.)

In the post-war period, it saw limited use with Communist forces during the Korean War. Soviet supplied RGD-33s and crude copies were both used by North Vietnamese forces in the First Indochina War and Vietnam War.

On October 6th, 2005, the Landmine and Cluster Munition Monitor reported that a RGD-33 grenade alongside two mines and an artillery shell was found in the grounds of a factory in Minsk, Belarus. It is not known if it was a buried weapons cache or unexploded ordnance from World War II.

== Users ==
- China
- Nazi Germany − Used captured grenades
- North Korea
- Soviet Union
- Vietnam − Crude copies were also used

== See also ==
- Model 24 grenade
- List of Russian weaponry

== Bibliography ==
- Bunker, Robert J. (2010). "Grenades". In Tucker, Spencer C; Pierpaoli Jr, Paul G; Kim, Jinwung; Li, Xiaobing; Matray, James I. (eds.). The Encyclopedia of the Korean War: A Political, Social, and Military History [3 volumes]. Bloomsbury Publishing USA. pp. 292−293. ISBN 978-1-85109-850-7.
- Campbell, David (2020). Soviet Soldier vs Finnish Soldier: The Continuation War 1941–44. Bloomsbury Publishing. ISBN 978-1-4728-3828-5.
- Embassy of Vietnam, United States (20 April 1971). "The Soviet Role in North Viet-Nam's Offensive". Vietnam Bulletin. VII (7). Embassy of Viet-Nam.: 17−23.
- Gebhardt, James F. (1998). Blazey, Scott (ed.). Official Soviet Army Hand Grenade Manual. Paladin Press. ISBN 978-0-87364-967-4.
- Hogg, Ian V, ed. (1987). Jane's Infantry Weapons, 1987−88 (13th ed.). Jane's Information Group. ISBN 978-0-7106-0843-7.
- Minayev, Boris (2018). Boris Yeltsin: The Decade that Shook the World. Glagoslav Publications. ISBN 978-1-78437-924-7.
- Rottman, Gordon L. (2015). The Hand Grenade. Bloomsbury Publishing. ISBN 978-1-4728-0735-9.
- Windrow, Martin (2018). French Foreign Légionnaire vs Viet Minh Insurgent: North Vietnam 1948–52. Bloomsbury Publishing. ISBN 978-1-4728-2893-4.
