= Vladimir Rdultovsky =

Russian engineer (1876–1939)

Vladimir Iosifovich Rdultovsky
- Born: 10 February 1876; Vladikavkaz, Terek Oblast, Russian Empire
- Died: 13 May 1939 (aged 63); Leningrad, Soviet Union
- Military career
- Allegiance: Russian Empire; Russian SFSR
- Branch: Imperial Russian Army; Red Army

Vladimir Iosifovich Rdultovsky (Russian: Владимир Иосифович Рдултовский; 10 February [O.S. 29 January] 1876 – 13 May 1939) was a development engineer, designer of artillery ammunition, explosive devices, and fuses in the Russian Empire and Soviet Union. He was honored Worker of Science and Technology of Russia in 1928.

== Biography ==
Rdultovsky was born in Vladikaavkaz. He entered the Voronezh Cadet Corps and graduated in 1893, then graduated from the Mikhailovsky Artillery School (1896), after which he graduated with honors from the Mikhailovsky Artillery Academy (1902). He trained at factories in England, France, Germany and Austria.

After graduation, he was appointed to the Main Artillery Directorate as a test engineer. Here he worked on the Artillery Committee and on the commission on the use of explosives in filling shells from 1904 to 1917.

In 1904, he developed a high explosive grenade which was used in combat during the Russo-Japanese War. He proposed a technique for determining the depth of penetration of projectiles into various environments. Subsequently, he developed 76-mm, 107-mm and 122-mm high-explosive TNT shells.

From 1909 to 1910, he developed two versions of hand grenades, one which entered service in 1912. In 1914, he redesigned the grenade of in order to improve its operational properties. The improved grenade was adopted as the Model 1914 grenade. and had the abbreviated name "RG-14".

Rdultovsky was the first director of the Troitsk equipment plant, later the Red Rocket plant and Plant No. 11 of Vokhimtrest, modern day Krasnozavodsk chemical plant.

He was the scientific secretary of the Commission for Special Artillery Experiments. Since 1917 he developed fuses. He developed the design of the first aviation high-explosive bomb FAB-250 and a projectile for anti-aircraft artillery. In 1926, he was accepted into the staff of the Kalinin Plant for the position of deputy manager of the design bureau. In November 1926, the plant created an Experimental Workshop for the development of new ammunition, in which fuses parts were manufactured according to Rdultovsky's drawings.

At the end of 1925, he received his first award from the Soviet government: a personalized gold watch for completing a government task to implement a German order for medium-caliber shots; then Sergo Ordzhonikidze gave him an AMO car as a gift. In 1928, he received the title “Honored Worker of Science”.

On 4 October 1929, he was arrested by the OGPU Collegium in the case “About k.-r. organizations in the military industry." He admitted his guilt and mistakes and was released on November 6.

He continued his design and teaching activities. Like the inventor of the Kalinin plant, K. I. Kovalev, Rdultovsky in 1933 was one of the first holders of the Order of the Red Star, which he was awarded for the development of fuses of the RG and RGM brands (Rdultovsky head membrane), the only ones in the world in the 1930s.

He founded of the theory of fuse design.

He died on 13 May 1939 and buried in the Detskoe Selo cemetery; The funeral of the “Academician of Soviet Ammunition” was solemn: in Leningrad he was transported to the Vitebsk station on a white hearse drawn by six white horses, and to the cemetery on a gun carriage. Traffic on Liteiny Prospekt was stopped; all military academies, as well as military units and factory delegates, among whom were Kalinin workers, took part in the farewell. “Leningradskaya Pravda” published an obituary on 16 May 1939, which said: "The Red Army and the defense industry suffered a heavy loss...".

=== Addresses ===
Detskoe Selo (Pushkin), st. Revolutions, 30.

== Awards ==
- Order of St. Vladimir, 4th Class (03/22/1915, captain)
- Order of St. Vladimir, 3rd Class (08/16/1916, colonel)
- Order of the Red Star (1933)

== See also ==
- Model 1914 grenade

== Proceedings ==
- Рдултовский В. И. Из отчета гв. штабс-капитана Рдултовского о заграничной командировке в 1906 году. — Санкт-Петербург: тип. «Артил. журн.», 1907. — [2], 26 с., 3 л. черт.; 26 см.
- Рдултовский В. И. О действии крупных снарядов на фортификационные сооружения Вердена / В.Рдултовский. — М. : Лит.-изд. отд. Полит. упр. Рев. воен. сов. Республики, 1920. — 16 с.; 23 см.
- Рдултовский В. И. Трубки и взрыватели / В. И. Рдултовский, воен. инж.-техн. — Л. : Воен.-техн. акад. РККА, 1926. — 27 см.
- Засл. деятель науки и техники, дивинженер В. И. Рдултовский (1940). Исторический очерк развития трубок и взрывателей от начала их применения до конца Мировой войны 1914-1918 гг (2.000 экз ed.). Moscow: Гос. изд-во оборонной промышленности (тип. Оборонгиза, Киев, Крещатик, 42).

== Bibliography ==
- И. И. Ломакина (1991). Наша биография. Очерки истории производственного объединения «Завод имени М.И. Калинина» 1869 – 1989 (10.000 экз ed.). Ленинград: Лениздат. ISBN 5-289-00819-5.
