= Defensive grenade wz. 33 =

Granat obronny wz. 33
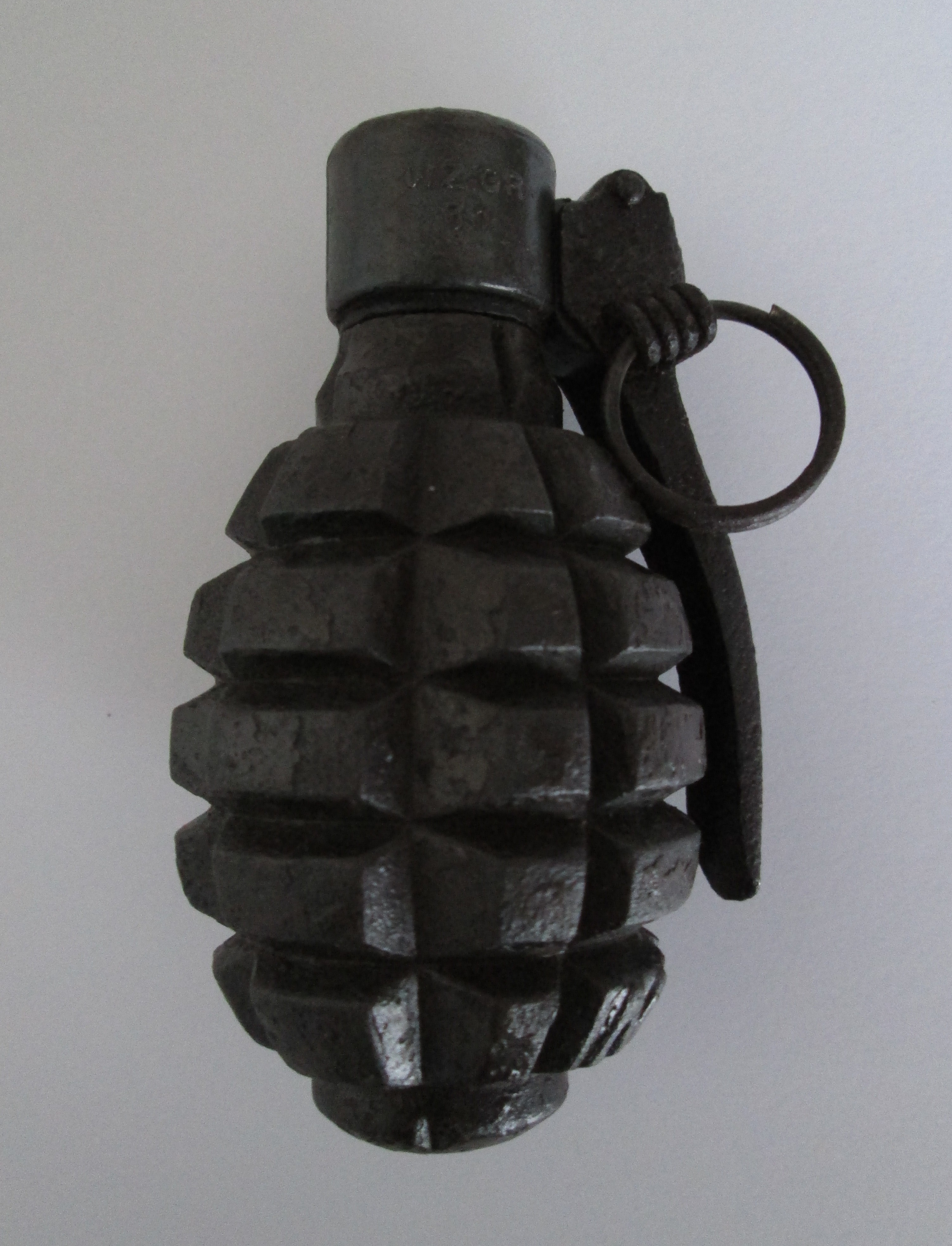
- Type: fragmentation grenade
- Place of origin: Second Polish Republic

Service history
- In service: 1933–1945
- Wars: World War II

Production history
- Designed: 1933
- Produced: 1933–1939

Specifications
- Filling: TNT or Picric acid
- Blast yield: 100 m (330 ft)

The granat obronny wz. 33 (lit. 'Defensive grenade, mark 33') was a fragmentation grenade used by the Polish Army before and during World War II.

== Development history ==
The wz. 33 grenade was basically a development of earlier Polish grenades.

The earliest of them, the Granat obronny wz. 23, was loosely based on the Mills bomb, the iconic fragmentation grenade of World War I that influenced a number of designs used by both the Central Powers and the Entente, notably the French F1 grenade.

After 1918 Poland inherited over 3,380,000 grenades of various types and during the Polish-Bolshevist War of 1920 bought several million more.

Because of large stocks, it was decided to focus early modernisation efforts at developing a new fuse rather than design the entire grenade for indigenous production. This was considered a logical choice as a number of Polish companies inherited production lines of German World War I grenade designs.

In 1923 the Department of Arms started a competition for a new fuse that would fit the German M16 and M17 Stielhandgranate hand grenades, the predecessor of the iconic Model 24 . A completely new design by A. Cierpiński of the Kielce-based Granat company was chosen and introduced as A.C. 23.

However, as the field tests proved that the A.C. 23 was prone to malfunction in moist conditions, the Department started a new competition in 1925, again won by Cierpiński's design (A.C. 25).

The A.C. 23 and 25 became the standard fuse of Polish grenades: Granat obronny wz. 23 used the A.C. 25 while Granat obronny wz. 17-1 (a Polish clone of the German M17 egg grenade) used the A.C. 23 variant.

The Granat company continued to develop the fuse and in 1929 presented the armed forces with a time fuse code-named Gr 29 based on earlier projects by Cierpiński. It was accepted as the standard fuse for the new Granat obronny wz. KC defensive grenade. Eventually the line of fuses led to the final design accepted into Polish service as Zapalnik wz. Gr. 31 (lit. 'Fuse Mark 1931, Granat factory').

== Design ==
The shell casing was molded from cast iron and formed into a pineapple-shaped oval, typical of World War I and II-era hand grenades.

The grenade was modelled after earlier Polish grenades of the 1920s (such as the Defensive grenade wz.24), which in turn were based on French World War I F1 grenade. It was fitted with wz.Gr.31 percussion fuse.

To increase reliability, the grenade had two blasting caps and two strikers. The casing was produced in one of three factories, a letter on the casing denoting the producer ("K" for Końskie, "M" for Warsaw and "W" for Wilno).

The wz. 31 fuse was considered among the best in the world, soon after its adoption by the Polish Army; both France and Romania bought a license for their production. Initially France bought 310,000 wz. 31 fuses in 1935 and two years later bought a license and adopted it as the standard fuse for all defensive grenades of the French Army. Another country to adopt the fuse (in 1931) was Greece.

== Usage ==
The Polish name for the grenade was because the blast radius of fragments often exceeded 100 metres and the grenade had to be thrown from a defensive position, such as a trench or from behind a wall.

Two such grenades as well as two wz.24 offensive grenades were standard military equipment for all enlisted soldiers.

== Former users ==
- Second Polish Republic

== See also ==
- Offensive grenade wz. 24 – (Second Polish Republic)
- Granat RGO-88 – (Poland)
- RGZ-89 – (Poland)
- F-1 grenade – (Soviet Union)
