= RG-41 =

Soviet fragmentation grenade used in WWII

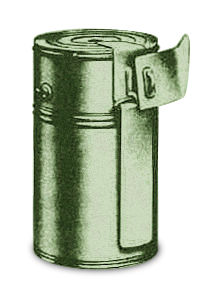
Drawing of RG-41 grenade

The Soviet RG-41 was a fragmentation grenade developed during World War II. It was in production for only short time from 1941 to 1942 before being replaced by RG-42.

It contained a 150 g high explosive charge in a cylindrical can; the total weight was about 440 grams. The grenade could be thrown about 30 to 50 meters; the lethal radius was up to 5 meters; the maximum lethal radius was up to 15 meters.

== See also ==
- RG-42
- RGD-33
- List of Russian weaponry
