= V40 Mini-Grenade =

V40
- Type: Hand grenade
- Place of origin: Netherlands

Service history
- In service: 1960s–1984

Specifications
- Mass: 136 grams (4.8 oz)
- Length: 6.5 centimetres (2.6 in)
- Diameter: 4 centimetres (1.6 in)
- Detonation mechanism: Pyrotechnic delay fuse – 4 seconds

The V40 is a fragmentation grenade manufactured in the Netherlands.

== History ==
These grenades were in service from the late 1960s to at least 2008.

During the Vietnam War, the Viet Cong/PAVN made a copy of the V40 grenade known as the LDC. It is slightly larger in size than the V40, and utilizes the fuze of the RGD-5 grenade.

== Design ==
The V40 grenade is spherical in shape, 6.5 centimetres (2.6 in) high, and 4 centimetres (1.6 in) in diameter – approximately the size of a golf ball. It has a safety pin and safety lever with a safety clip attached to the safety lever.

The steel body of the grenade has 326 squares pressed into its inside face to produce separate fragments when the explosive fill is detonated. The V40 weighed 136 grams (4.8 oz) and was issued primed from the manufacturer. Fuse delay time was four seconds.

This grenade was considered lethal up to a radius of 5 metres (16 ft) and had a safety radius of about 25 metres (82 ft). It was commonly referred to as the Mini-Frag, Golf ball grenade or the Hooch popper.

Due to its small size, a considerable number could be carried; however, its small size also made the weapon dangerous when wearing gloves, as the impact of the striker on the primer was difficult to feel.

== Users ==
- Canada
- Netherlands
- United States
  - Used by SOG operators in the Vietnam War and the Naval Special Warfare Development Group during the Global War on Terror.

== See also ==
- HG 85
- Mk 2 grenade
- M67 grenade
- M26 grenade
- SFG 87
- Mecar M72
- Arges Type HG 84
- GLI-F4 grenade
- Stielhandgranate
- F1 grenade (Australia)
- Defensive grenade wz. 33
- M75 hand grenade
