= Reciprocating gait orthosis =

Medical equipment

Reciprocating gait orthosis (RGO) is a long-leg hip–knee–ankle–foot orthosis in which the two hip joints are linked by a push–pull cable or bar so that flexion of one hip produces extension of the other, generating an alternating, alternating step pattern while preventing simultaneous bilateral hip flexion in stance. The device consists of leg braces connected to a pelvic band, allowing users with paralyzed legs to achieve a walking motion by shifting their weight from side to side.

== Development and variants ==
Developed in the late 1970s for children with myelomeningocele and later adapted for adults with thoracic-level paraplegia, standard RGOs incorporate locked knees, solid-ankle sections and a thoracolumbar pelvic band, and they require the user to off-load body weight through crutches or a walker. Recent variants—such as the isocentric RGO and the advanced RGO with dorsiflexion-assist ankles—use lighter alloys and quick-release pelvic joints to reduce donning time and to lower the metabolic cost of walking, while experimental hybrid devices combine the mechanical linkage with functional electrical stimulation to lessen upper-limb loading.

Adding dorsiflexion-assist ankles or integrating powered hip actuators can reduce energy expenditure and improve endurance, but even modern RGOs remain slower and more fatiguing than wheelchair propulsion, so clinicians usually position the device as a supplemental rather than primary mode of mobility.

== Clinical applications ==
Despite these technological advances, patient selection remains critical for successful outcomes. Clinical guidelines recommend RGOs for people with complete spinal cord lesions above the first lumbar vertebra (L1) or with spina bifida who have intact upper-extremity strength, supple hip and knee joints, and good cognitive capacity to follow training protocols. A 41-study systematic review of gait-rehabilitation strategies reported mean overground walking speeds of about 0.24 metres per second for RGO users—comparable with hip-guidance orthoses—and found that the device enabled faster sit-to-stand transfers than alternative designs. Follow-up data summarized in the same review showed that most users continued to employ the orthosis primarily for therapeutic purposes such as maintaining bone density, preserving joint range and improving bowel motility rather than for day-to-day community mobility, reflecting the high energy demand of RGO ambulation.

== Therapeutic benefits ==
Therapeutically, short daily periods of standing and walking in an RGO can help combat disuse osteoporosis, lessen pressure ulcer risk, stimulate cardiopulmonary activity and enhance psychosocial well-being by allowing eye-level social interaction.

== Training and implementation ==
Training protocols typically progress from static standing to reciprocal stepping within parallel bars, then to overground ambulation with lofstrand crutches (forearm crutches with cuff supports); correct alignment and maintenance are essential, as poor fit or excessive device weight are recognised predictors of abandonment. Accordingly, contemporary reviews advise careful patient selection, structured physiotherapy and realistic goal-setting to maximise the therapeutic value of RGOs while acknowledging their limited efficiency as a means of independent long-distance ambulation.
