= Offensive grenade wz. 24 =

wz. 24
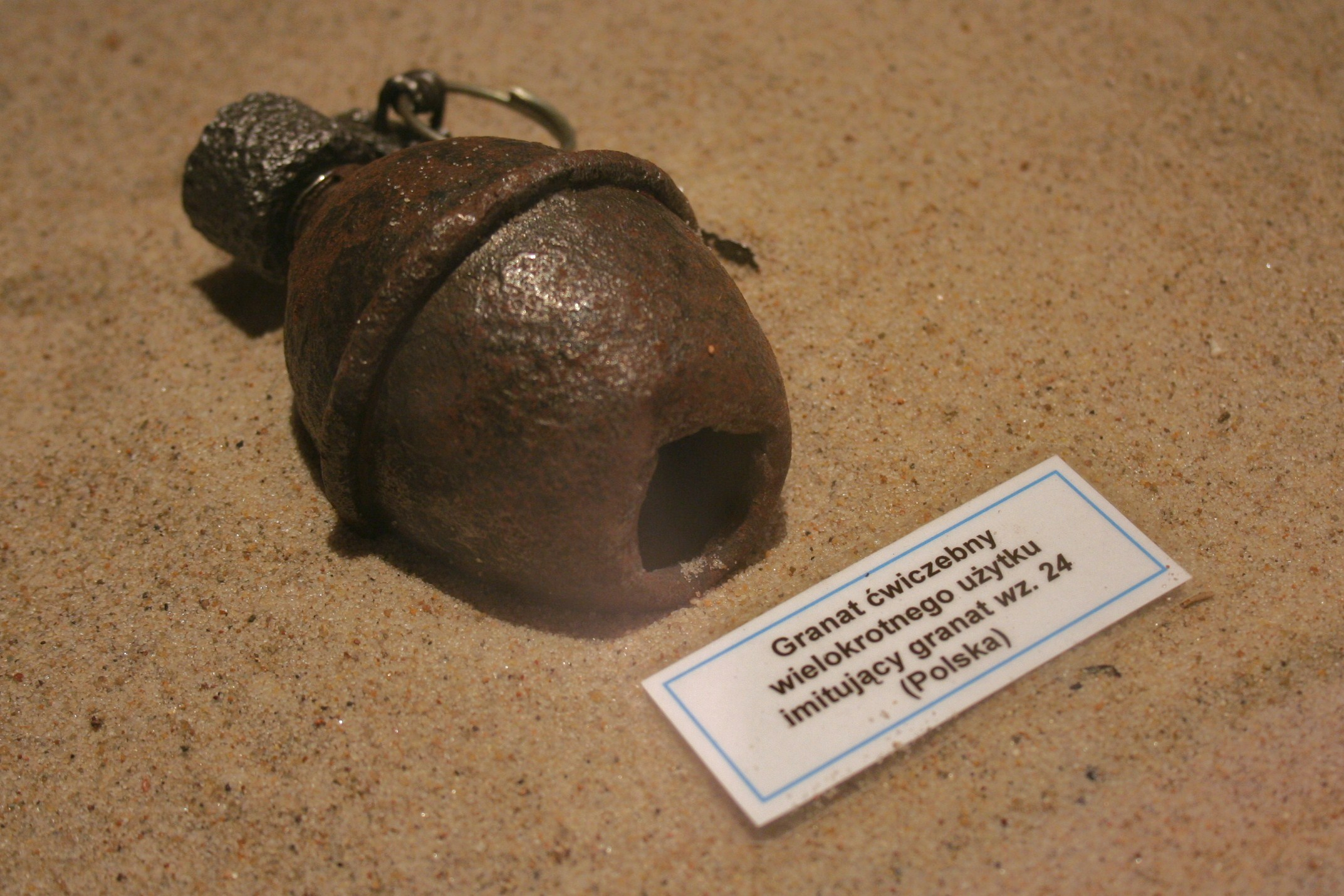
- Type: Hand grenade
- Place of origin: Poland

Service history
- Wars: Second World War

Production history
- Designed: 1924
- Produced: 1924-1939

Specifications
- Mass: 360 g

The Granat zaczepny wz.24 (lit. 'Offensive grenade, Mark 1924') was a concussion grenade used by the Polish Army before and during World War II.

== Design ==
The oval egg-shaped shell casing was made of thin sheet metal filled with picric acid or TNT.

Initially used with a variety of fuses, since early 1930s the grenade was used with the standard Zapalnik wz. Gr. 31 time fuse designed for the Defensive grenade wz.33.

The grenade armed with the wz. Gr. 31 fuse is sometimes referred to as wz. 24/31 to distinguish it from the original wz.24 grenade armed with different fuses.

== Users ==
- Poland
  - Standard offensive grenade in 1924-1939.
- Soviet Union
  - Captured during the attack of Poland in 1939.
- Nazi Germany
  - Used captured grenades.
- Finland
  - Grenades captured by the Wehrmacht in Poland handed over during the Winter War

== See also ==
- Grenade wz. 33
