= RG-42 =

Soviet hand grenade

RG-42 grenade
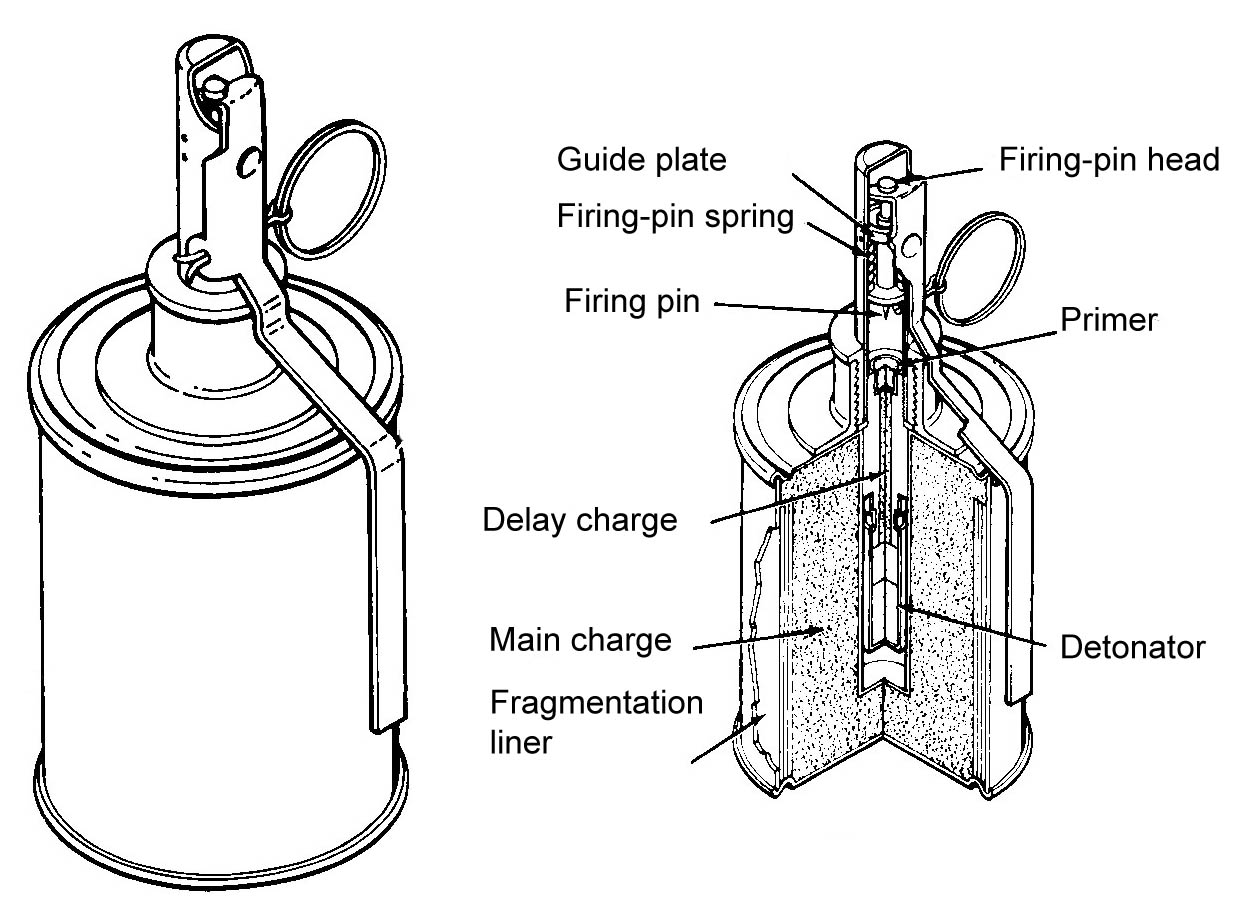
- United States Army manual diagram
- Type: Fragmentation grenade
- Place of origin: Soviet Union

Service history
- In service: 1942–1981 (Soviet Union)
- Used by: See § Users
- Wars: World War II; Continuation War; Korean War; Vietnam War; Rhodesian Bush War; Soviet–Afghan War; Gulf War; Georgian Civil War; First Chechen War; Afghan Civil War (1992–1996); Insurgency in the North Caucasus; Russo–Ukrainian War

Production history
- Designer: S. G. Korshunov
- Designed: c. 1942
- Produced: 1942 – c. 2010

Specifications
- Mass: 420 g (15 oz)
- Height: 85 mm (3.3 in) (body); 130 mm (5.1 in) (body with fuse)
- Diameter: 54 mm (2.1 in)
- Filling: TNT
- Filling weight: 110–120 g (3.9–4.2 oz)
- Detonation mechanism: 3.2–4.2 second delay fuze

The RG-42 (Russian: Ручная Граната образца 42 года, romanized: Ruchnaya Granata obraztsa 42 goda, lit. 'Hand Grenade pattern of year [19]42') was a fragmentation grenade designed by S. G. Korshunov.

While it was introduced as a stopgap measure to replace the complex and expensive RGD-33 grenade, it remained in use with the Soviet Union, Warsaw Pact countries, and allied nations such as People's Republic of China after World War II. In Soviet service it was used until 1981 during the Soviet–Afghan war.

== Design ==
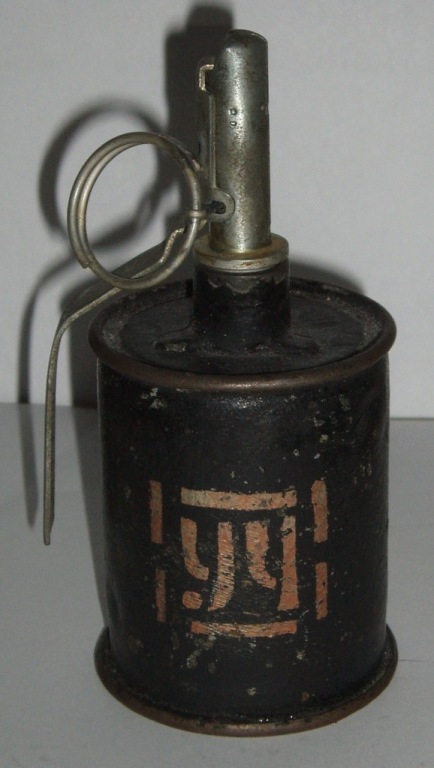
An inert RG-42 used for training

Unlike the RGD-33, the RG-42 was a simple design, being a little more than a steel sheet cylinder filled with explosives. It required no casting and was produced in existing can factories. It also shared the UZRG fuse used on the F-1 grenade.

It contains approximately 110–120 grams (3.9–4.2 oz) of TNT filling in a cylindrical stamped-metal can, with a diameter of 54 millimetres (2.1 in). According to author Gordon L. Rottman, the inner fragmentation liner was a thin sheet of steel rolled into three layers with diamond shaped grooves.

The RG-42 is fitted with a UZRG or UZRGM fuze with a 3.2–4.2 second delay, the same types used by the F-1 and RGD-5 grenades.

The grenade can be thrown about 30–40 m (33–44 yd) and has an effective fragmentation radius of approximately 25 m (27 yd). The blast effect is dangerous over a radius of at least 10 m (11 yd).

The total weight of the grenade with the fuze is 420 grams (15 oz). Brassey's Infantry Weapons of the World describes this grenade as having 118 g (4.2 oz) of TNT, 20 m (22 yd) fragmentation range, and a 40 m (44 yd) tossing range. The book Jane's Infantry Weapons gives a height of 130 millimetres (5.1 in) with fuse and 85 mm (3.3 in) without, and a mass without fuse of 384 g (13.5 oz).

== History ==
The RG-42 was originally introduced during World War II from 1942 onwards as an emergency measure to replace the RGD-33 grenade, a pre-war design which proved to be too complex to operate, too expensive and time-consuming to produce. It remained in use with the USSR, Warsaw Pact countries, and Communist China in the post-war period.

After World War II, it saw action with Communist forces in the Korean War alongside the Chinese-made Type 42; and North Vietnamese troops during the Vietnam War.

The RG-42 was still used by Soviet troops alongside the F-1 and RGD-5 as late as 1981, during the early stages of the Soviet-Afghan war. In the mountains of Afghanistan, the 3.2–4.2 second delay fuze not only gave the mujahideen enough time to search for cover, but it also posed the danger of the grenade rolling back to friendly positions after it was thrown. As result the RG-42 was replaced by the RGN and RGO hand grenades, which were introduced mid-1980s.

In the 1990s, it was still used by Iraqi forces during the Gulf War; During the Georgian Civil War several paramilitary groups purchased ex-Soviet surplus grenades from Russian officers; In 1992, prior to the First Chechen War, it was estimated that Chechen forces loyal to separatist leader Dzhokhar Dudayev captured 80,000 RG-42s from ex-Soviet stocks; In 1994, several Afghan militias including the Taliban possessed some grenades alongside other Soviet small arms left behind following the collapse of the Najibullah regime.

Despite the RG-42 age, it was "still likely to be found almost anywhere, especially in Africa and the Balkans" in the 2010s, according to Jane's; In 2011, Azerbaijan security forces seized at least three grenades from Caucasus Emirate insurgents; use of RG-42s by government forces and Russian separatist forces in Ukraine was also reported during the Russo–Ukrainian War as late as 2024.

== Foreign copies ==
Although the RG-42 is considered obsolete, China still produced copies (as the Type 42 grenade) until the late 2000s, while Poland and Romania produced the RG-42 as late as 2010.

According to US intelligence, Czechoslovakia and North Korea have also produced and used locally made copies of the RG-42. The latter have olive drab-painted bodies.

== Users ==
- Afghanistan − Captured by the Afghan mujahideen
- Bulgaria
- Caucasus Emirate
- Chechen Republic of Ichkeria
- China − Produced locally as the Type 42
- Czechoslovakia
- East Germany
- Georgia − Used during civil conflicts in 1990s
- Iraq
- North Korea − Were used at least until 1997
- Poland − Were used at least until 2019
- Romania
- Soviet Union
- Ukraine − Used by government forces and Russian separatists as late as 2024
- Vietnam
