= RGD-5 =

Soviet anti-personnel fragmentation grenade

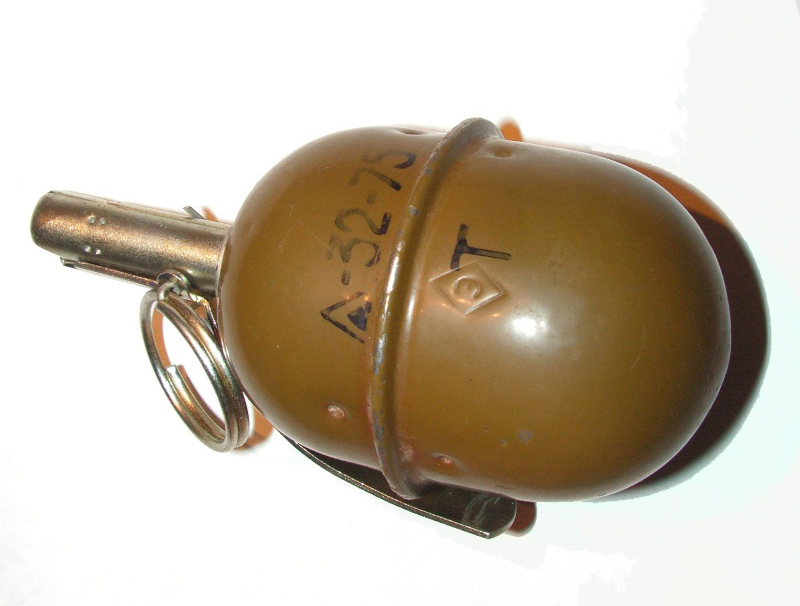
- RGD-5 hand grenade with UZRGM fuze fitted
- Type: Hand grenade
- Place of origin: Soviet Union

Service history
- In service: 1954–present
- Wars: Vietnam War; Six-Day War; The Troubles; Yom Kippur War; Soviet–Afghan War; Iran–Iraq War; Invasion of Kuwait; Gulf War; First Chechen War; Kosovo War; Second Chechen War; Iraq War; Russo-Georgian War; First Libyan Civil War; Syrian Civil War; Russo-Ukrainian War

Specifications
- Mass: 310 g (11 oz)
- Length: 116.8 mm (4.60 in)
- Diameter: 58.4 mm (2.30 in)
- Effective firing range: 15–20 m (49–66 ft)
- Maximum firing range: 30 m (98 ft)
- Filling: Trinitrotoluene
- Filling weight: 110 g (3.9 oz)
- Detonation mechanism: 3.2 to 4.2 seconds. pyrotechnic delay fuse
- Blast yield: ~350 fragments

The RGD-5 (Russian: Ручная граната дистанционная, romanized: Ruchnaya granata distantsionnaya, lit. 'distant hand grenade') is a Soviet anti-personnel fragmentation grenade, designed in the early 1950s.

== Design ==
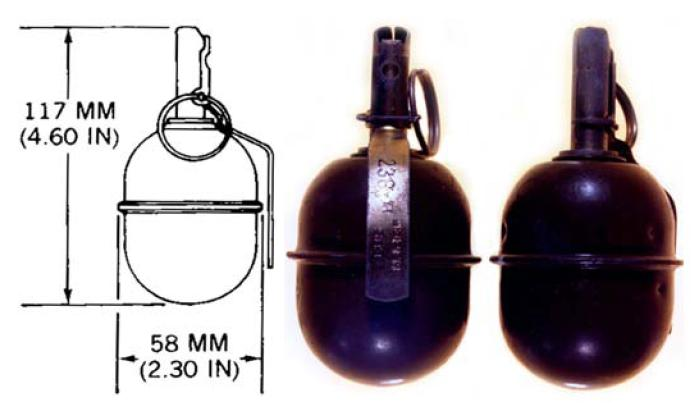
RGD-5 measurements

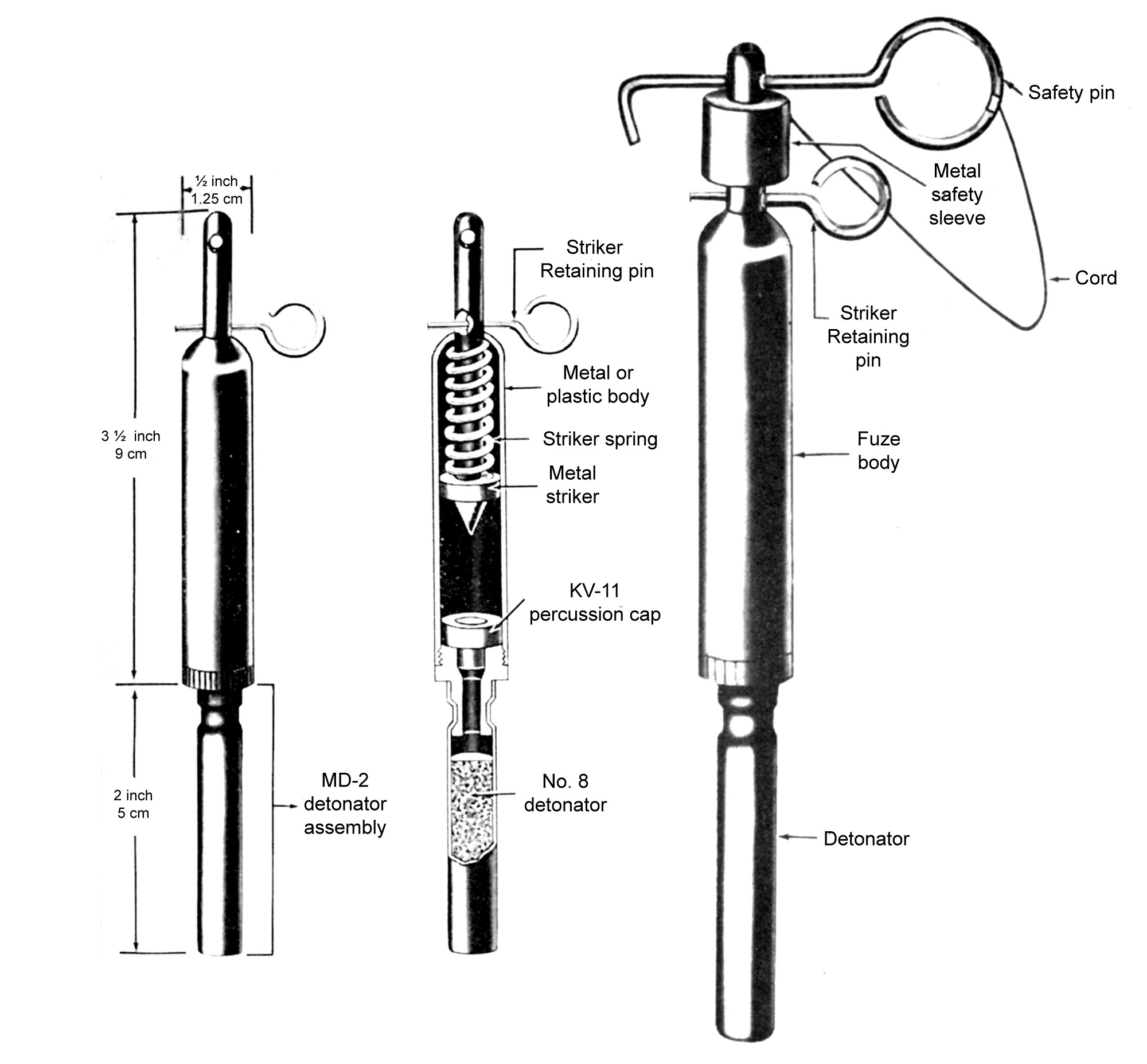
MUV zero-delay pull fuze, normally connected to a tripwire.

The grenade is egg-shaped without ribbing, except for a lateral ridge where the two halves of the grenade join. It weighs 310 grams (11 oz), is 117 millimetres (4.6 in) in length, and 58 millimetres (2.3 in) in diameter. The surface has a few small dimples with green or olive drab paint.

It contains a 110-gram (3.9 oz) charge of TNT with an internal fragmentation liner that produces around 350 fragments with a fatality radius of around 3 metres (9.8 ft) and a wounding radius of 25 metres (82 ft).

Typically, the RGD-5 uses the 3.2 to 4.2 second delay UZRG, UZRGM or UZRGM-2 fuze, a universal Russian type also used in the RG-41, RG-42, and F1 grenades or the more modern DVM-78 fuze. It is also possible to screw a MUV booby-trap firing device into the fuze well.

The RGD-5 can be thrown about 35 to 45 metres (115 to 148 ft) by the average soldier and on throwing, the grenade makes a loud "crack" sound as its spoon falls out activating the fuze.

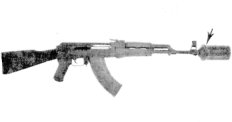
AK-47 with a Kalashnikov grenade launcher mounted to its muzzle

== Variants ==
=== URG-N ===
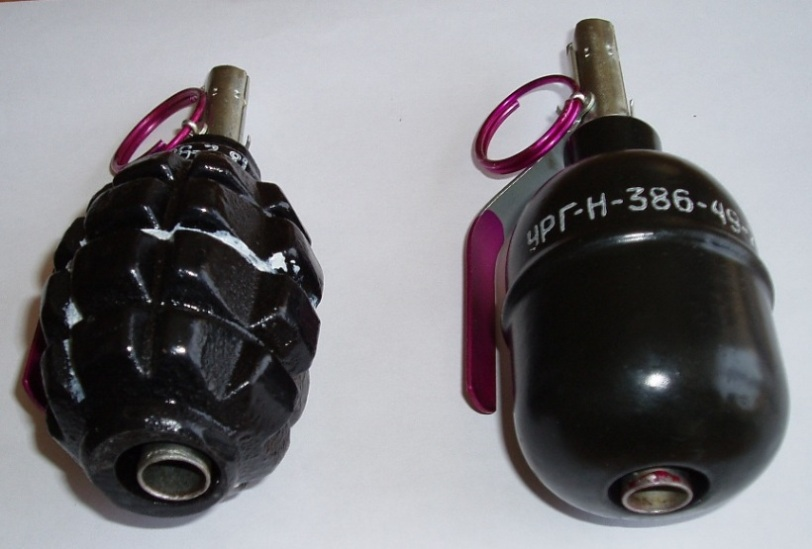
URG-N (right)

The URG-N is a reusable training model of the RGD-5 with a modified fuze containing a tiny explosive charge which simulates the detonation of the grenade. The body of this grenade is painted black with white markings.

=== Rifle grenade ===
The AK-47 can mount a (rarely used) cup-type grenade-launcher that fires standard Soviet RGD-5 hand-grenades. The soup-can shaped launcher is screwed onto the AK-47's muzzle.

It is prepared for firing by inserting a standard RGD-5 hand-grenade into the launcher, removing the safety pin, and inserting a special blank cartridge into the rifle's chamber. With the butt-stock of the rifle on the ground it can be fired.

The maximum effective range is approximately 150 metres (492 ft).

RGD-5s are still manufactured in Russia with copies produced in Bulgaria, China (as the Type 59) and Georgia.

=== Foreign production ===
==== China ====
===== Type 59 =====
Chinese built variant.

==== Bulgaria ====
===== RGO-78 =====
People's Republic of Bulgarian '70s variant with DVM-78 fuse.

Grenade weighed 450 g (16 oz) and contained 85 g (3.0 oz) charge of TNT.

===== RGN-86 =====
Another People's Republic of Bulgarian modification with DVM-78 fuze.

Weighed 265 g (9.3 oz) and contained 57 g (2.0 oz) charge of TNT.

==== Poland ====
===== RGO-88 =====
Polish People's Republic modified variant with А-IX-1 filling (95% RDX and 5% Phlegmatized explosive). 60 g (2.1 oz) of explosive mass.

==== Lithuania ====
===== RPG-92 =====
Lithuanian copy manufactured by small arms factory "Vytis" between 1992–1996.

Not an exact copy, considering the RPG-92 uses a cylindrical shell instead of an egg shaped one.

==== Ukraine ====
In late 2024, the Ministry of Defence of Ukraine codified and approved the use of domestically produced RGD-5 analogs for its military.

This grenade is modified to meet modern standards and has a kill zone limited up to 25 m (82 ft), making it suited for offensive operations.

== Users ==
=== Current ===
- Afghanistan
- Armenia
- Bulgaria
- China
- Georgia
- Ethiopia
- Iraq
- North Korea
- Palestine
- Poland
- Romania
- Russia
- Syria
- Ukraine: Both RGD-5 and locally produced copies used.
- Vietnam
- Al-Qaeda

=== Former ===
- East Germany
- Panama: Panama Defense Forces
- Soviet Union

== Usage ==
=== Service ===
The RGD-5 was accepted into service with the Soviet Army in 1954.

The RGD-5 was widely exported, and is still in service with many armies in the Middle East and the former Soviet bloc.

Millions of RGD-5s and clones have been manufactured over the years. Though not as advanced as more modern grenades specifically designed to penetrate CRISAT standard body armour, the RGD-5 remains as an effective, low-cost weapon.

A single RGD-5 grenade costs around $5 US.

=== In assassination attempt of George W. Bush ===
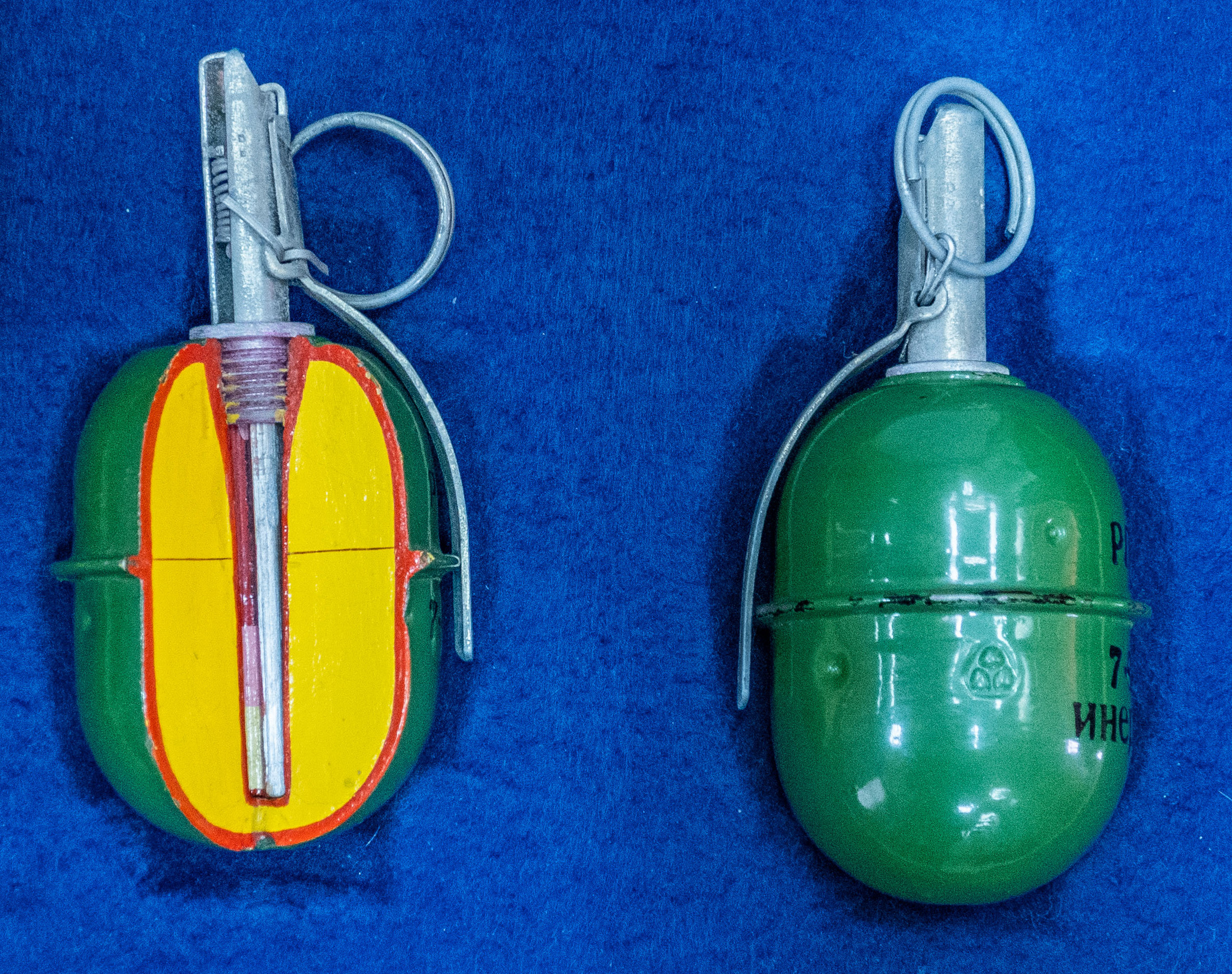
Grenade cutaway and training sample (DOSAAF Museum, Minsk)

On 10 May 2005, Vladimir Arutyunian, a Georgian citizen and ethnic Armenian, waited for the United States President George W. Bush and Georgian President Mikheil Saakashvili to speak in Tbilisi's central Liberty Square.

When Bush began speaking, Arutyunian threw an RGD-5 hand grenade wrapped in a red plaid handkerchief toward the podium where Bush stood as he addressed the crowd.

The grenade landed 18.6 metres (61 ft) from the podium, near where Saakashvili, his wife Sandra Roelofs, Laura Bush, and other officials were seated.

The grenade failed to detonate. Although original reports indicated that the grenade was not live, it was later revealed that it was. After Arutyunian pulled the pin and threw the grenade, it hit a girl, cushioning its impact.

The red handkerchief remained wrapped around the grenade, and it prevented the striker lever from releasing. A Georgian security officer quickly removed the grenade, and Arutyunian disappeared, but was later arrested.

== Specifications ==
- Body height: 73–76 mm
- Fuze: UZRGM-2
- Declared maximum fragmentation casualty range: 25 m
- Actual radius of the effective casualty area: 5 m

== See also ==
- List of Russian weaponry

== Bibliography ==
- Weeks, John, ed. (1980). Jane's infantry weapons, 1980-81. Jane's Publishing Company. ISBN 978-0-531-03936-6.
- Hogg, Ian V. (1991). Jane's Infantry Weapons 1991-92. Jane's Information Group. ISBN 0-7106-0963-9.
