= F-1 grenade (Russia) =

F-1
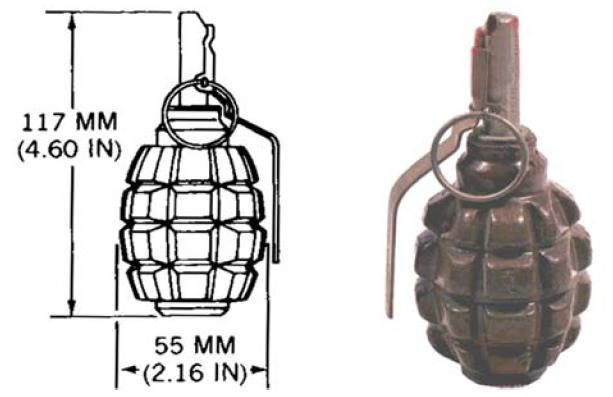
- F-1 hand grenade
- Type: Anti-personnel hand grenade
- Place of origin: Soviet Union

Service history
- In service: 1939–present
- Wars: World War II; Hukbalahap Rebellion; Korean War; Vietnam War; Rhodesian Bush War; Six-Day War; Yom Kippur War; Angolan Civil War; Iran–Iraq War; Gulf War; Iraq War; First Libyan Civil War; Syrian civil war; Russo-Ukrainian war

Specifications
- Mass: 600 g (1.3 lb)
- Length: 130 mm (5.1 in)
- Diameter: 55 mm (2.2 in)
- Filling: Trinitrotoluene
- Filling weight: 60 g (2.1 oz)
- Detonation mechanism: Time delay fuse 3.2 to 4.2 s

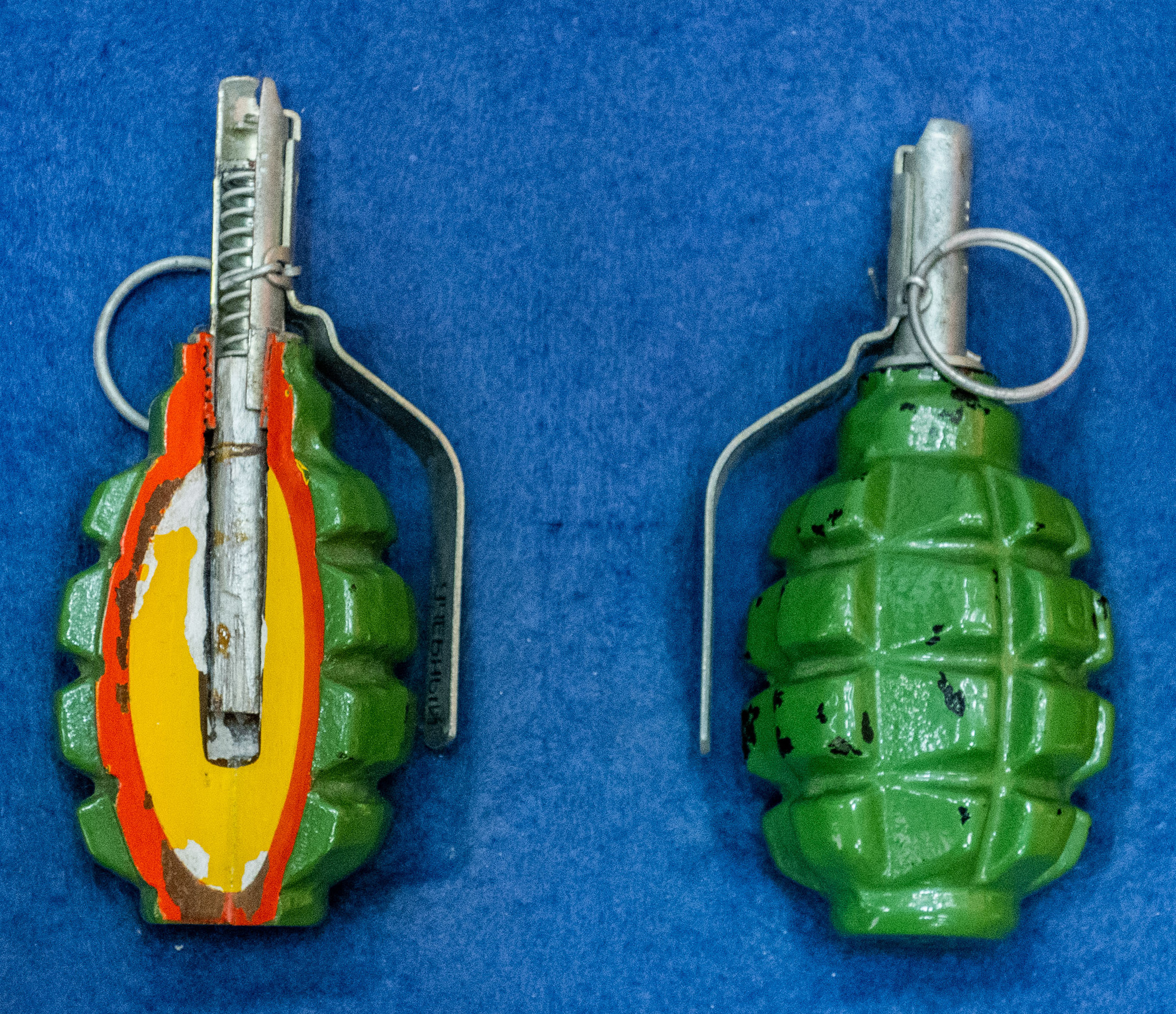
Grenade cutaway and training sample (DOSAAF Museum, Minsk)

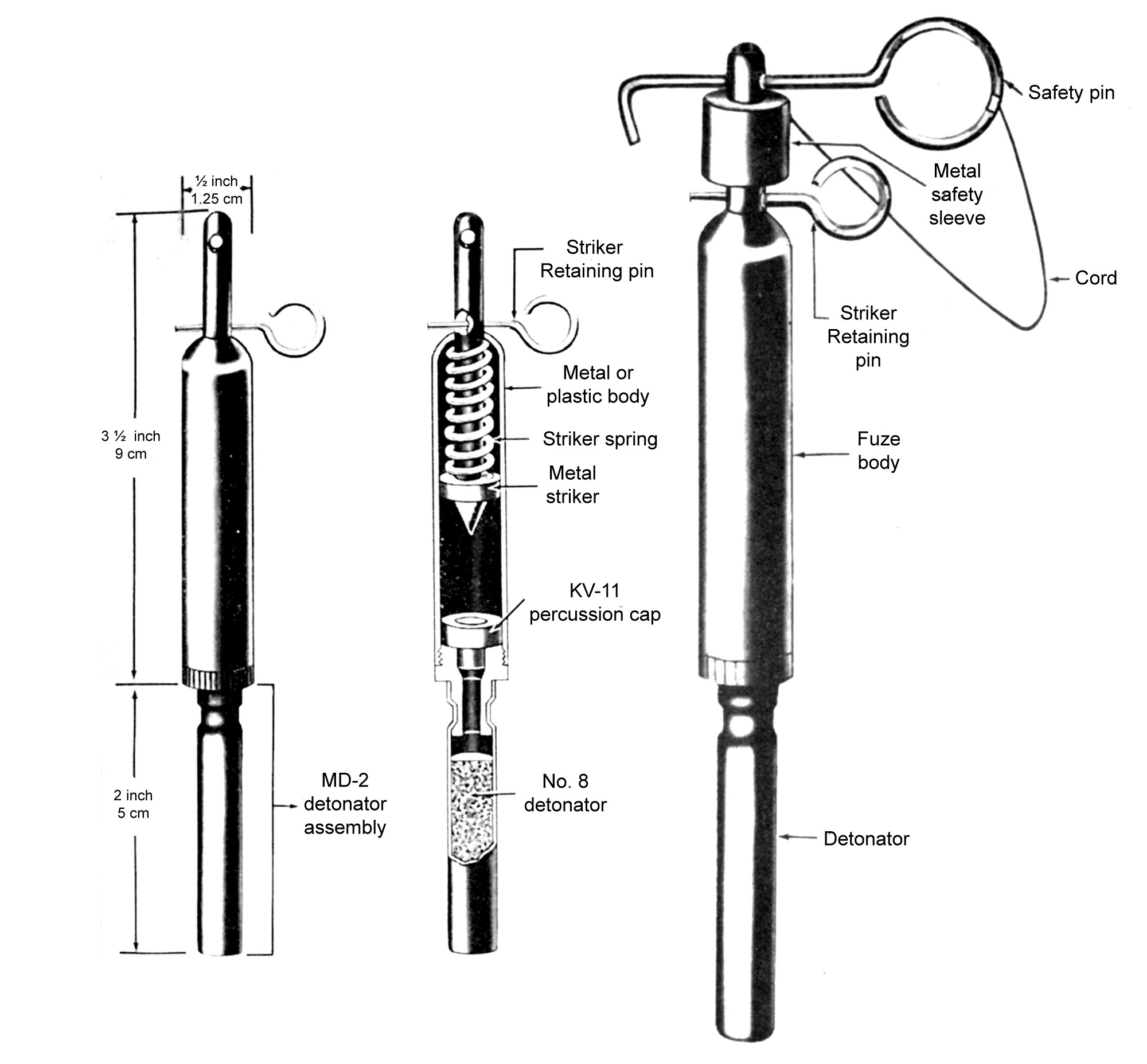
Russian MUV booby trap firing device. A zero-delay pull fuze which is normally connected to a tripwire. The MUV fuze is fully compatible with F-1 and RGD-5 grenades. Fitting an MUV fuze makes it easier to conceal the grenade when setting a boobytrap, e.g. partial burial. Note that the detonator is usually threaded, so it can be screwed into the F-1 grenade body

The Soviet F-1 hand grenade (Russian: Фугасный 1, romanized: Fugasnyy 1, lit. 'Explosive, Type No. 1') is an anti-personnel fragmentation defensive grenade.

== History ==
The F-1 was introduced during World War II and subsequently redesigned post-war.

While the F-1 is no longer regarded as a front-line weapon with the former Warsaw Pact countries, it still remains in widespread use, especially with insurgent groups.

== Design ==
The F-1 grenade’s body based on the French F1 grenade cast iron body and contains a 60 g (2.1 oz) explosive charge (TNT). The total weight of the grenade with the fuze is about 600 g (21 oz).

Due to its shape and its yellow-green color, it is nicknamed the limonka (fem. 'little lemon'). It is also nicknamed Efka (Russian: Эфка) for the letter F.

The F-1 also is similar to the American Mk 2 "pineapple grenade", which was ultimately modeled on the French F-1.

The F-1 has a steel exterior that is notched to facilitate fragmentation upon detonation and to prevent hands from slipping. The distance the grenade can be thrown is estimated at 30–45 m (98–148 ft).

The radius of the fragment dispersion is up to 200 m (660 ft) (effective radius is about 30 m (98 ft),). Hence, the grenade has to be deployed from a defensive position to avoid self-harm.

About 60 percent of the grenade body pulverizes during the explosion, only 30 percent of the body splits into 290 high-velocity, sharp-edged splinters each weighing around 1 gram with an initial speed of about 700 m/s (2,300 ft/s).

=== Fuse ===
During World War II, the F-1 used the UZRG (Russian: unifitsirovanny zapal k ruchnym granatam, lit. 'standardized hand grenade fuse') fuse with a time delay of 3.2 to 4.2 seconds. The UZRG was issued separately from the grenade body, in lots of 20 stored inside cardboard boxes wrapped with waxed paper. The Koveshnikov fuse with a time delay of 3.5 to 4.5 seconds was also used during the war.

Post-war grenades typically uses the UZRGM fuse also used in the RG-42 and RGD-5 grenades. The standard time delay for this fuze is 3.2 to 4.2 seconds. Some grenades are fitted with the more modern DVM-78 mousetrap fuse with a 3.2–4 seconds delay timer.

There was a myth originating from a 1983 article written by Larry Dring for Soldier of Fortune (SOF) magazine that implied UZRGM fuze variants are available in versions with delays from zero (i.e., instantaneous, specifically for use in booby-traps) to 13 seconds. The author wrongly assumed that the numbers stamped on the fuze body were an indication of the time delay. Actually, this number indicates the factory production line, not the fuze delay. Having fuzes without clear external marking indicating that it is "short fuze" with 0 or 1–2 seconds delay would be dangerous for soldier operating them. All UZRGM fuzes have the same delay regardless of the numbers stamped on them, which is concealed when the fuze is inserted into the grenade body.

The same SOF article also claimed that the UZRGM is interchangeable with the M200 fuze series used on the United States Mk 2 and M26 grenades. According to Gordon L. Rottman, that is not true: the UZRGM can only be screwed halfway through US grenades (enough to snugly fit and function), while US fuzes would not screw into Soviet grenades at all. Dring also wrote for SOF that the while UZRGM can be used on the French F-1, the French fuze would not screw on the Soviet F-1.

== Variants ==
=== Soviet Union ===
- URG (Russian: учебная ручная граната, romanized: Uchebnaya ruchnaya granata, lit. 'Training hand grenade') is the F-1's simulation-training variant.

=== Foreign copies ===
The F-1 was used and copied by Spain during the Spanish Civil War. Several other countries and insurgent groups also produced their own copies, including China, Bulgaria, Czech Republic, Georgia, Poland, and Romania. During the Russo-Ukrainian War, Ukraine started production of an improved F-1 grenade which was approved for military use in September 9, 2024.

- Type 1 − Chinese copy
- F1/N60 − Polish rifle grenade based on the F-1, but with an impact fuze instead of a time delay fuze
- MKEK Mk 2 − Post-war Turkish design combining the body of the F-1 with a United States-designed M204A2 fuse
- M15 − Yugoslav variant almost identical to the F-1, but the 5.6 second igniter is entirely different. Officially designated as the Defensive hand grenade M15 (Serbian: Obramben bomba rucna M15)
- M35 − Yugoslav copy virtually similar to the M15. Officially designated as the Defensive hand grenade M35 (Serbian: Obramben bomba rucna M35)

== Operators ==
- Bulgaria
- China
- Czechoslovakia
- Czech Republic
- Finland
- Georgia
- Iraq
- North Korea
- Poland − Remained in frontline service as late as 2010
- Romania
- Russia
- Soviet Union
- Spanish Republic
- Syria
- Turkey − Produced as the MKEK Mk 2
- Ukraine − Domestically produced copies
- Vietnam
- South Yemen − 50,000 delivered between 1982 and 1987 by Czechoslovakia
- Yugoslavia − Produced as the M15 and M35

== See also ==
- List of Russian weaponry
