= Armored Troop Carrier (LCM) =

Military landing craft

Armored Troop Carrier (ATC)
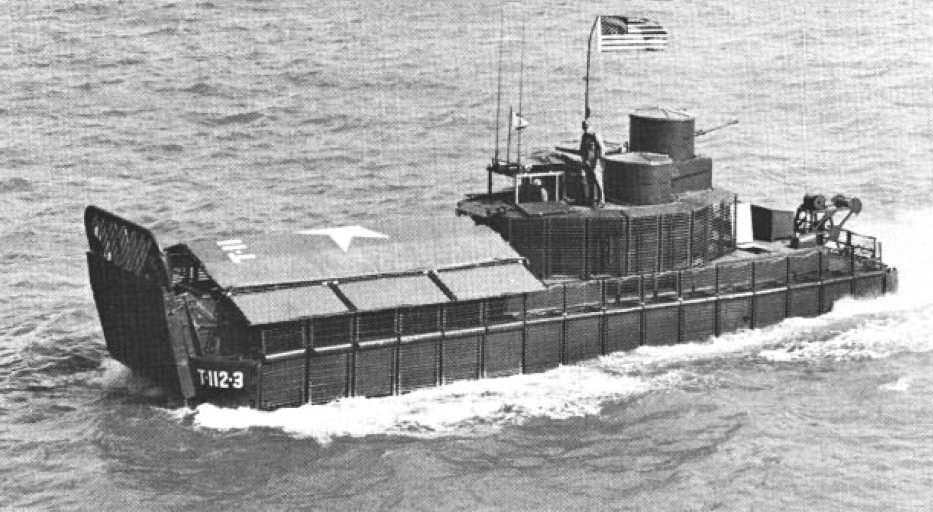
- An Armored Troop Carrier of River Assault Division 112

Class overview
- Name: Armored Troop Carrier (ATC)
- Operators: United States Navy; (South Vietnam) Republic of Vietnam Navy; (Khmer Republic) Khmer National Navy

General characteristics
- Type: armored riverine transport ship
- Displacement: 66 short tons (60 t)
- Length: 56 ft (17 m)
- Beam: 17.5 feet (5.3 m)
- Installed power: 2×225 hp (168 kW)
- Propulsion: two Gray Marine 6-71 diesel engines
- Speed: 8 knots (15 km/h)
- Range: 110 nautical miles (200 km; 130 mi)
- Complement: 7
- Armament: one 20 mm cannon; two .50-caliber machine guns; four .30-caliber machine guns; two Mk 18 grenade launchers
- Armor: XAR-30-type steel and bar armor

Armored Troop Carriers (ATC), often called Tangos from the phonetic alphabet for T, were LCM-6 landing craft modified for riverine patrol missions. They were used by the Mobile Riverine Force (MRF) of the United States Army and Navy in the Vietnam War. They were also used by Republic of Vietnam Navy (RVNN) and Khmer National Navy.

== History ==
The MRF began to be organised in late 1966 with the arrival of the 2nd Brigade, 9th Infantry Division at Vung Tau on 19 December 1966. The Navy contribution would be RIVFLOT 1, comprising two river assault squadrons (RAS 9 and RAS 11), each with two river assault divisions under them. The basic mission of RIVFLOT 1 was to transport Army troops to battle zones and support them in battle. The craft the Navy acquired for this task was the ATC, a modified LCM-6. Like its World War II ancestor, it had a large well deck for transporting troops and a drop-down ramp for landing soldiers on a hostile beach. The RVNN had been using LCM variants in its river assault groups for many years, so the craft had a proven track record on the rivers. The U.S. Army, however, wanted more than a simple landing craft; it desired a craft capable of patrolling rivers, providing fire support for troops and minesweeping. The boat ultimately developed was equal parts assault craft and troop transporter.

The Tango was 56 feet (17 m) long with a 17.5 feet (5.3 m) beam and a 3.3 ft (1.0 m) draft. Displacing 66 short tons (60 t), it could achieve a top speed of 8 knots (15 km/h; 9.2 mph) knots with its twin Gray Marine 225-hp diesel engines, however armor and weapons reduced the effective speed to 4-7 knots. At 6 knots (11 km/h; 6.9 mph) with a full fuel load of 450 US gallons (1,700 L; 370 imp gal) of diesel, the Tango could travel 110 nautical miles (200 km; 130 mi) without refueling. High-hardness XAR-30-type steel and bar armor provided ballistic protection for the crew from rounds up to .50-caliber in size and offered some protection against high explosive anti-tank (HEAT) rounds up to 57mm. Below-waterline hull blisters provided added hull protection, minimized draft, and increased stability. The Tango's armor, however, generally could not withstand the full force of a B40 HEAT grenade.

Armament on the Tango usually consisted of one 20 mm cannon, two .50-caliber and four .30-caliber machine guns, two Mk 18 grenade launchers and various personal weapons (M16 rifles, shotguns and M79 grenade launchers). The ATC carried a Navy crew of seven and could accommodate a platoon of 40 soldiers, an M113 armored personnel carrier, or a 105mm howitzer with a prime mover.

By the end of 1967 each river assault squadron contained 26 ATCs, 16 Assault Support Patrol Boats (ASPBs), five Monitors, two command and control boats (CCBs) and one refueller (a modified LCM).

== Operators ==
- United States – U.S. Navy
- South Vietnam – Republic of Vietnam Navy
- Khmer Republic – Khmer National Navy

== See also ==
- Assault Support Patrol Boat (a.k.a. Alpha Boat)
- Brownwater Navy
- Cambodian Civil War
- Dinassaut
- Khmer National Navy
- Royal Lao Navy
- Republic of Vietnam Navy
- Vietnam War
- Weapons of the Cambodian Civil War
- Weapons of the Laotian Civil War
- Weapons of the Vietnam War

== Bibliography ==
- Gordon L. Rottman and Hugh Johnson, Vietnam Riverine Craft 1962-75, New Vanguard series 128, Osprey Publishing Ltd, Oxford 2006. ISBN 9781841769318
