= Brown-water navy =

Naval force capable of operating in littoral waters

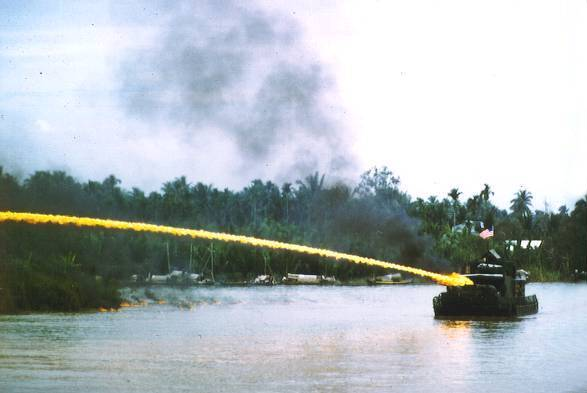
A United States Navy Monitor, a brown-water navy vessel, firing napalm during the Vietnam War

A brown-water navy or riverine navy, in the broadest sense, is a naval force capable of military operations in inland waters (rivers, lakes and inland seas) and nearshores. Brown-water navies have existed since the ancient era, since ancient Egyptians fought on the Nile, but the described term originated in the United States Navy during the American Civil War, when it referred to Union forces patrolling the muddy Mississippi River, and has since been used to describe the small gunboats and patrol boats commonly used in rivers, along with the larger "mother ships" that supported them.

Brown-water navies are typically only used for patrolling and enforcing internal waters, in contrast to blue-water navies, which can independently conduct operations in the open oceans and project power far offshore. Green-water navies, which operate mainly in brackish estuaries, bays and shallow seas not too far off coasts (typically within the bounds of exclusive economic zones), fill the operational gap between brown-water and blue-water navies.

== History ==
=== River Thames ===
The River Thames was a regular thoroughfare for the Sovereign until the middle of the 19th century. Monarchs would be rowed up and down the river in a Royal barge, with transport and security organised by the King's Bargemaster. The barges were operated by the Royal Watermen, drawn from the ranks of the Company of Watermen and Lightermen. In 1798, Watermen and other groups of river tradesmen on the River Thames voluntarily formed associations of River Fencibles. These were officially drawn together in 1803 as the "Corps of River Fencibles of the City of London". Members of the Corps escorted the barge carrying the body of Lord Nelson along the Thames in small boats during his state funeral in 1806. The Corps of River Fencibles was eventually disbanded in 1813.

=== Habsburg and Ottoman Empires ===
Both the Habsburg Empire and the Ottoman Empire maintained river flotillas on the Danube in 18th and 19th centuries, most notable for the use of šajka boats. Men who served in the Habsburg flotilla were known as Šajkaši.

=== Napoleonic Wars ===
After losing its blue-water fleet in the Battle of Copenhagen in 1807, the kingdom of Denmark-Norway quickly built a brown-water navy. The partial successes of the resulting Gunboat War were undone by land invasion.

=== Mexican–American War ===
During the Mexican–American War, Commodore Matthew C. Perry decided to invade the Mexican towns along the Gulf Coast near Tabasco. In October 1846 Perry was in command of USS Mississippi, USS Vixen, USRC McLane, USS Reefer, USS Bonito, USS Nonata and USRC Forward with a 253-man landing force. After capturing the port of Frontera on the Tabasco River, the ships under Perry's command crossed the bar at the mouth of the river and traveled 74 miles (119 km) up river to the town of Tabasco. After several days of bombardment of Tabasco, Perry's ships captured several Mexican ships on the river and brought them back to Frontera. Some were commissioned into U.S. Navy service and others were burned.

The city of Tampico was poorly defended and offered a base for operations for the conquest of the state of Tamaulipas. For these reasons Tampico became the next target for seizure by American naval forces. Commodore David Conner directed that it be attacked in late October 1846 and those plans were captured by General Antonio López de Santa Anna. Santa Anna directed that Tampico be almost abandoned and his forces be moved up river to Pánuco. This move was completed by 28 October. The bar at the mouth of the Pánuco River was only eight feet and hindered the movement of American ships up the river. The wife of the former American consul at Tampico sent word to Conner that the river was rising and that the town had been abandoned. Conner's forces crossed the bar on 14 November and began shelling the town. Almost immediately the remaining garrison at Tampico surrendered and Conner learned that the troops stationed there had retreated to Pánuco 25 miles upstream from Tampico. After Conner's ships moved to Pánuco and several days of naval bombardment, the Mexican forces at Pánuco surrendered. The American Army quickly occupied Tampico and used it for a staging point for a planned attack on Veracruz.

=== American Civil War ===
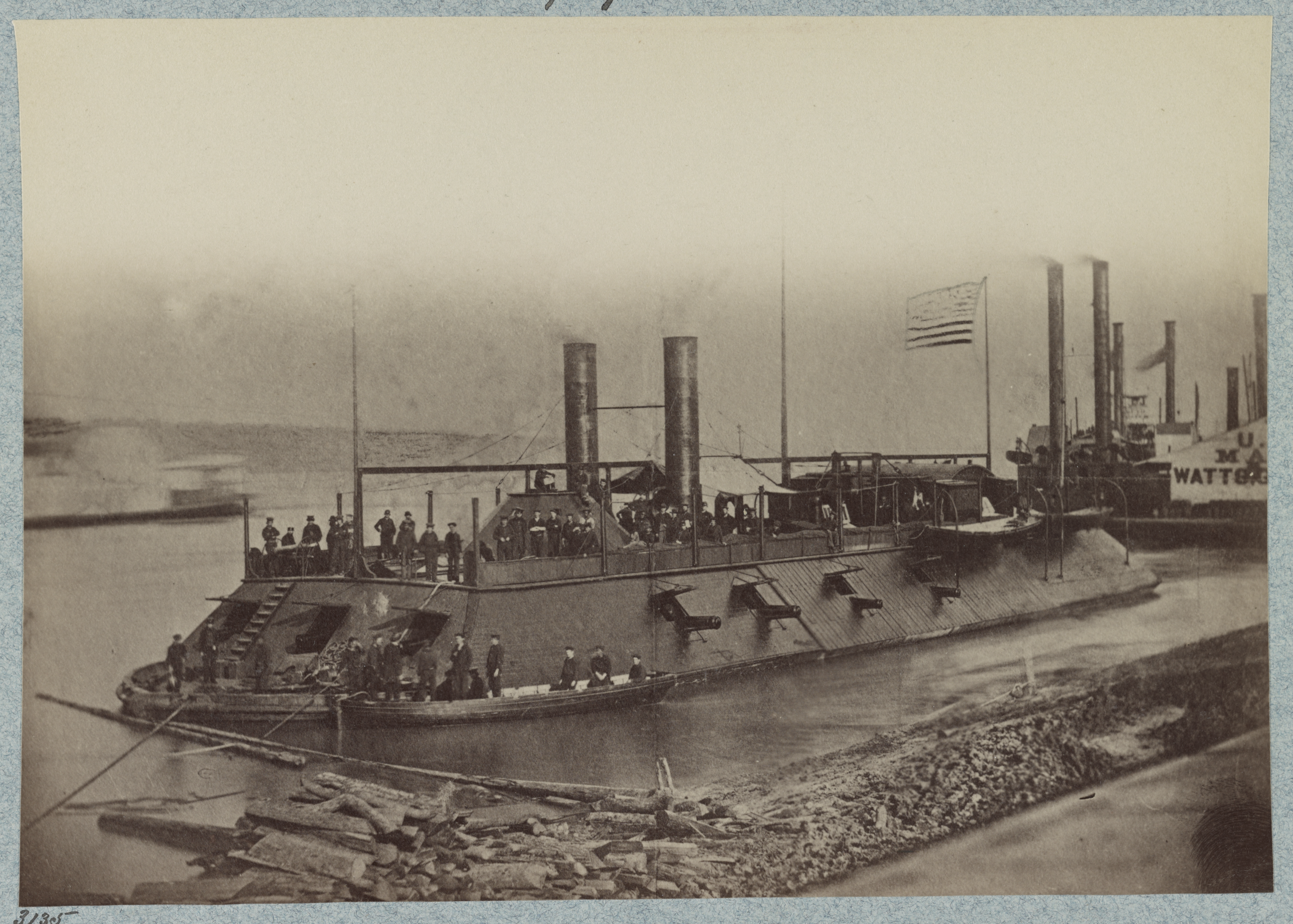
USS Cairo, part of the U.S. Navy's "brown-water navy", during the American Civil War, on the Mississippi River, in 1862

The U.S. Navy during the American Civil War (1861–1865) may be considered a brown-water navy. As a blueprint for the "strangulation" of the Confederate States of America, Winfield Scott's Anaconda Plan called for a two-pronged approach by first blocking the South's harbors and then pushing along the Mississippi River, effectively cutting the Confederate territory in two while also robbing the South of its main artery of transport. The U.S. Navy was assigned the blockade of the seaports, while a new force of gunboats and river ironclads, together with regular army units, would take, or at least lay siege to, the Confederate forts and cities along the Mississippi. In the early days of the war, U.S. Army built and crewed these boats, with the naval officers commanding them being the only direct connection to the U.S. Navy. By the autumn of 1862, the boats and their mission were transferred to the Department of the Navy. Because of the river's murky brown water, the ships that participated in these Mississippi campaigns were quickly referred to as the brown-water navy, as opposed to the regular U.S. Navy (which was henceforth referred to as the deep-water or blue-water navy).

=== Paraguayan War ===
After the end of the American civil war the next major military conflict in the world was the Paraguayan War (1864–1870). In this the Brazilian brown-water navy, which comprised large ironclads as well as river monitors, had a crucial role.

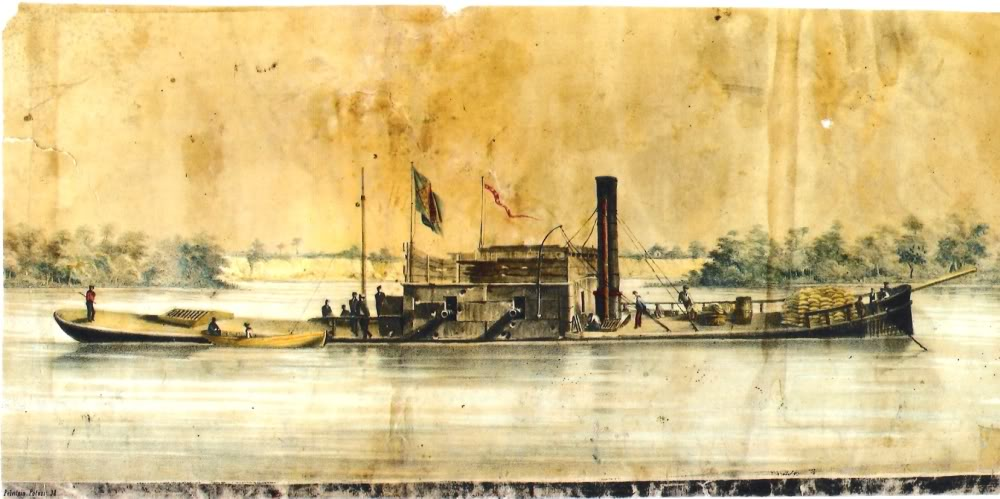
Barroso, a Brazilian ironclad of the central casemate type, the first vessel to dash past the Fortress of Humaitá on the River Paraguay

The natural water highway to the Republic of Paraguay was the River Paraguay but this route was blocked by the formidable Fortress of Humaitá. It comprised a 6,000-foot (1,800 m) line of artillery batteries overlooking a sharp concave bend in the river, at a point where the channel was only 200 yards (180 m) wide. A chain boom could be raised to block the navigation. The fortress was exceedingly hard to take from the landward side for it was protected by impassible swamp, marsh or lagoons and, where not, by 8 miles (13 km) of trenches with a garrison of 18,000 men. The river was shallow, uncharted and capable of trapping large vessels if the water level should fall. In that environment the greatest threat to shipping was "torpedoes" (nineteenth-century floating naval mines).

Six vessels of the Brazilian ironclad squadron eventually succeeded in dashing past Humaitá in an incident known as the Passage of Humaitá, an event considered as nearly impossible. Although it could not operate far beyond its military forward base, nevertheless, Brazilian domination of the river meant that Paraguay could no longer resupply the fortress, and eventually it was starved out and captured by the land forces in the Siege of Humaitá.

Even after Humaitá was captured − which took more than two years – the Paraguayans improvised further strongpoints along the river, further delaying the Allies (the Empire of Brazil, the Argentine Republic and the Republic of Uruguay).

=== U.S. gunboat diplomacy in China ===
Save for an occasional river patrol boat, the United States' river ironclad navy was all but abolished at the end of the American Civil War. Yet the concept of a river defense force lived on in countries and regions where rivers enabled the U.S. to project its military presence, allowing it to protect its foreign interests abroad. U.S. river boats (gunboats) of the Asiatic Fleet operated in portions of Chinese rivers, sometimes referred to as the "Asiatic Navy" or "China Navy", during the turbulent 1920s, patrolling for insurgents and river pirates. Two of the most notable China gunboats were USS Panay, which was sunk in 1937 by Japanese military aircraft prior to World War II, and USS Wake, which was captured by the Japanese in December 1941. The U.S. Navy of that era used the term for protecting U.S. foreign policy and its citizens abroad "gunboat diplomacy". The U.S. Navy, China gunboat, USS Asheville, was sunk by the Japanese in March 1942.

=== Second Sino-Japanese War ===
During the Second Sino-Japanese War, the Manchukuo Imperial Navy served principally to patrol the Sungari, Amur, and Ussuri rivers, support Army operations against Chinese resistance forces, and guard Manchukuo's riverine borders with the Soviet Union. In 1939 the Navy's forces came under the control of the Manchukuo Imperial Army as the River Defence Fleet.

=== Indochina War ===
During the First Indochina War, the French Navy created the Dinassaut (naval assault divisions), in 1947, to operate in the waters of the Mekong and Red rivers, conducting search and destroy missions, against communist guerillas and river pirates. They succeeded the river flotillas created in 1945, by the request of General Leclerc. The Dinassaut served until the end of the conflict in 1955, and its concept would be latter adopted by the United States Navy in the Vietnam War.

Ten Dinassauts were created, with five based in Cochinchina and the others in Tonkin. Each one was made of about ten vessels and one Commandos Marine unit. The types of vessels operated by a Dinassaut included LCI, LCT, LCM, LCVP, LCS, LCA, LSSL and fire support vessels.

The role of the Dinassaut was to transport, land and support the infantry, to patrol the watercourses and to assure the supply of the isolated posts.

The sailors that served in the Dinassaut were referred as the "Navy in Khaki", in comparison with the sailors that served in the ocean that were referred as the "Navy in White".

=== Portuguese Colonial War ===
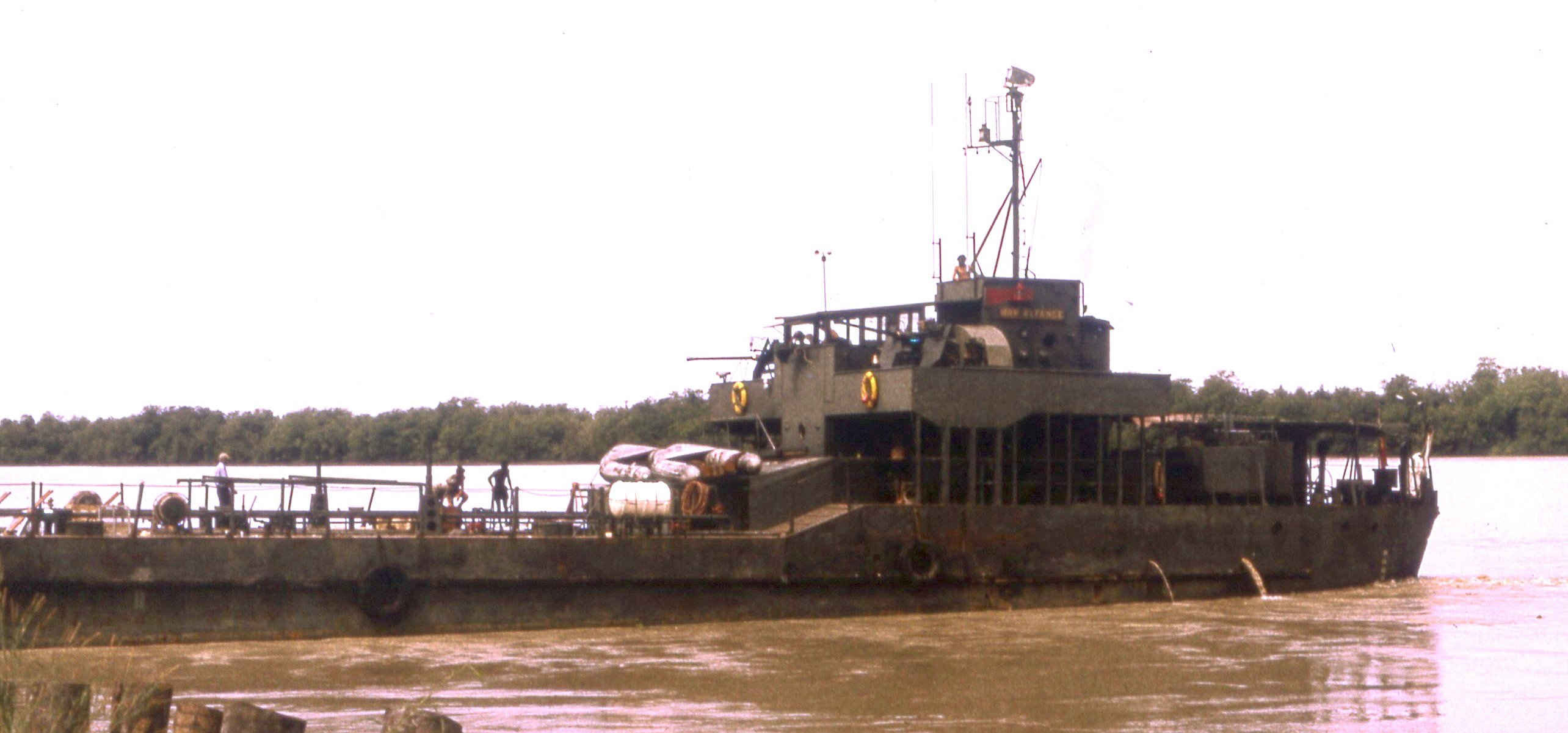
The large landing craft NRP Alfange supplying the garrison of Bambadinca, Portuguese Guinea, in the early 1970s.

In Portuguese service, the brown-water navy has been often referred as the "Naval Dust" (Portuguese: Poeira Naval), for its use of a large number of small vessels, in comparison with the conventional blue-water navy that uses a smaller number of larger vessels. In several historical periods, the Portuguese Navy had to develop riverine forces to operate in then-Portuguese colonies in Asia, South America and Africa.

During the Portuguese Colonial War, from 1961 to 1974, the Portuguese Navy created a brown-water navy to operate in the rivers and lakes of Angola, Portuguese Guinea and Mozambique, against the separatist, communist guerrillas, as well as river pirates. For the organization of their riverine forces, the Portuguese were inspired by the French experience in Indochina with the Dinassaut and by their own historical experience in the operation of river flotillas in support of the Portuguese colonial pacification campaigns in Africa during the late 19th and early 20th centuries.

Under the local commands of the Navy, the Portuguese created river boat flotillas (esquadrilhas de lanchas) in the Zaire River in Angola, in the Lake Nyasa in Mozambique and in the river system of the Portuguese Guinea. Smaller riverine forces were also created in the Cabinda Province of Angola, in Eastern Angola (to operate in the Cuito, Zambezi, Cuando, Lungué Bungo and Cuanza rivers) and in Tete to operate in the Mozambican section of the Zambezi river. These forces were responsible for reconnaissance, surveillance, the interdiction of the rivers and lakes to the enemy, and to avoid their use for the infiltration and supply of guerrillas in the interior of Portuguese territory. Additionally, the riverine forces were also tasked with the mobile fire support to the land forces, the movement of troops, the supply of the Portuguese garrisons and the support of the civilian population in the riverine areas.

For these riverine forces, the Portuguese Navy conceived five types of vessels: the LFG (large river patrol boats of 200–300 t), the LFP (small river patrol boats of 18–40 t), the LDG (large landing craft of 480–550 t), the LDM (medium landing craft of 50 t) and the LDP (small landing craft of 12 t). The LFGs were armed with 40 mm guns and the LDPs with 20 mm guns, with several units of both types being also armed with rocket launchers. The LDG, LDM and LDP types were based, respectively, in the LCT, LCM and LCVP/LCA designs, but were modified in order to have a greater mission endurance and to be used for patrolling, fire support and as a mobile base for the Marines. This modifications included the protection of sensitive parts with armor, the installation of 40 mm (LDGs) or 20 mm (LDMs and LDPs) guns and the improvement of the crew accommodations, partially at the expense of the cargo deck.

The river boat flotillas were complemented by assault units of Special Marines (fuzileiros especiais) and security units of Marines (fuzileiros). The Portuguese Marines operated based in the patrol boats and landing craft and also using their own rubber boats.

=== Vietnam War ===
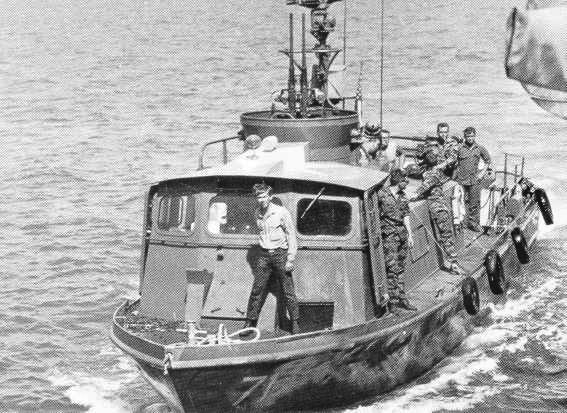
Swift Boat in Vietnam

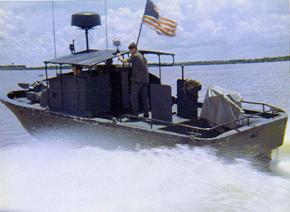
PBR Mk II

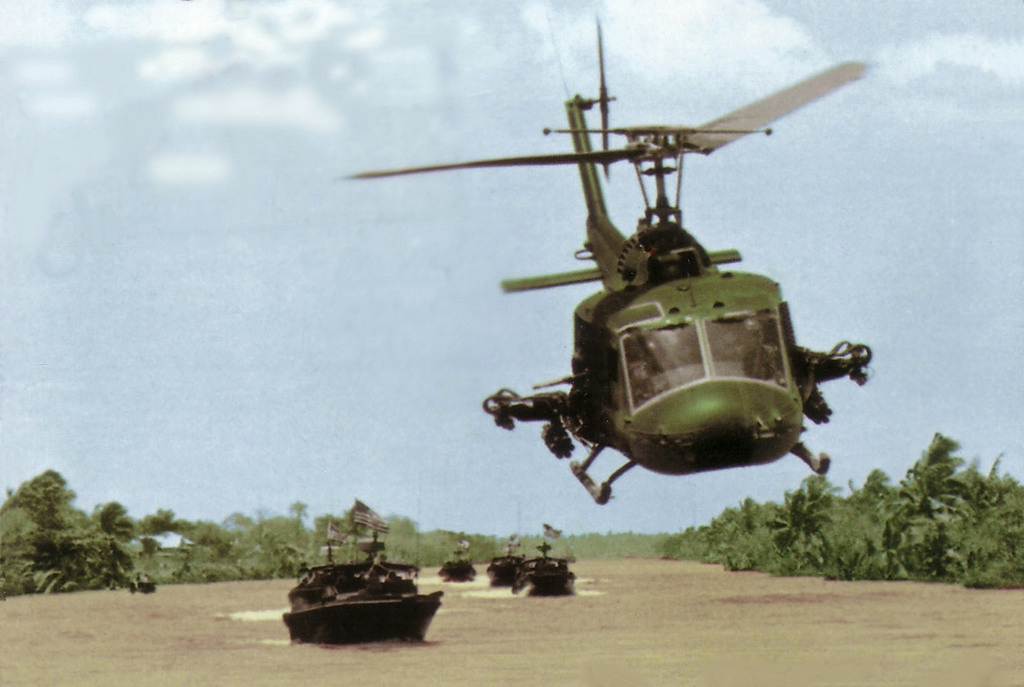
U.S. Navy Bell UH-1E Huey helicopter of Helicopter Attack Squadron (Light) 3 (HA(L)-3) escorting river patrol boats

On 18 December 1965, for the first time since the American Civil War, the United States Navy formalized its new, brown-water navy in Vietnam. Initially, the brown-water navy patrolled the inland waterways of the Mekong River, primarily with South Vietnamese river craft (RAG—River Assault Groups) boats, which were mostly inherited from the French Navy during the previous war and in turn, had been received from the U.S., as military aid, in the French fight against the Viet Minh, the Communist-led Vietnamese alliance. As the new fiberglass Patrol Boat, River using water jet propulsion, became available, it became the main interdiction vessel for patrolling the Vietnamese Mekong River country.

For coastal duty the South Vietnamese Navy used larger seaworthy craft. These were replaced by newer U.S. Navy Swift Boats (PCF—Patrol Craft Fast, aluminum 50 footers) and United States Coast Guard Point-class cutters. By the late 1960s, the Swift Boat would commence operations alongside the PBRs in the inland waters, as well as maintaining operations along the coastline. Navy and Coast Guard ships assumed coastal duties. The Swift boats were operated by small crews but became a staple asset in riverine operations; they patrolled waterways, performed special operations, gunfire support and insertion of troops into enemy territory.

The brown-water Mobile Riverine Force was a joint venture between the Navy and the Army, modeled after the earlier French Riverine and coastal patrols in the First Indochina War (1946–1954). In the beginning this force consisted of mostly modified surplus U.S. World War II landing craft (boats), such as the LCMs, LCVPs, LCIs, etc. The only entirely new riverine boat from the French Indochina War had been the French designed STCN (an all-steel "V" hulled boat, approximately 40 feet in length, whose design had been influenced by the U.S. LCVP). This particular craft influenced the design of the U.S. Navy's only original riverine boat built for the Vietnam War—the 50-foot all-steel hull, aluminum superstructured Assault Support Patrol Boat (ASPB) or "Alpha Boat". The ASPB was built by the Gunderson Company, in Oregon, USA, and was of reinforced construction, in order to survive exploding mines. As a consequence, the ASPB earned a reputation as the "minesweeper" of the riverine forces.

Along with the aforementioned PBRs, other riverine craft included PCFs, ASPBs, and monitors (modified LCMs). Together these craft formed a Mobile Riverine Force, that utilized various supporting facilities, such as the Yard Repair Berthing and Messings, advance bases, LSTs, helicopter and seawolf units.

The brown-water navy (in conjunction with other efforts, such as Operation Market Time and Operation Game Warden) was largely successful in its efforts to stop North Vietnam using the South Vietnamese coast and rivers to resupply its military and the Viet Cong. The flow of weapons and ammunition came to a virtual standstill during Operation Market Time, from 1965 and 1970.

Brown-water river assault units were formalized in January 1967 with the 2nd Brigade, 9th Infantry Division arriving under the command of Major General William Fulton. Later that same year, in combination with U.S. Navy Task Force 116 & 117 they formed the Mobile Riverine Force. In 1970, for the last time since the Civil War, the Navy stood down the last of its brown-water navy units, as they were turned over to the South Vietnamese and Cambodian governments under the Vietnamization policy.

== See also ==
- United States Navy Riverine Squadron
- Special warfare combatant-craft crewmen
- Navies of landlocked countries
- Insect-class gunboat
- Mississippi Marine Brigade
- Amur Military Flotilla
- Maritime geography
- Operation Sealords
- Serbian River Flotilla
- River Battalion (Croatia)
- Romanian Danube Flotilla
- Humaitá-class gunboat
- River gunboat
- River pirate
- Green-water navy

== Bibliography ==
- Affield, Wendell (2012). Muddy Jungle Rivers: A river assault boat cox'n's memory journey of his war in Vietnam. Hawthorn Petal Press. ISBN 978-0-9847023-0-5.
- Bauer, K. Jack (1969). Surfboats and Horse Marines: U.S. Naval Operations in the Mexican War, 1846—48. Annapolis, Maryland: U.S. Naval Institute.
- Friedman, Norman (1987). U.S. Small Combatants: an Illustrated Design History. Annapolis, Maryland: U.S. Naval Institute. ISBN 0-87021-713-5.
- Steffes, James (2005). Swift Boat Down: The Real Story of the Sinking of PCF-19. Bloomington, Indiana: Xlibris. ISBN 159926613X.
