= Mk 18 Mod 0 grenade launcher =

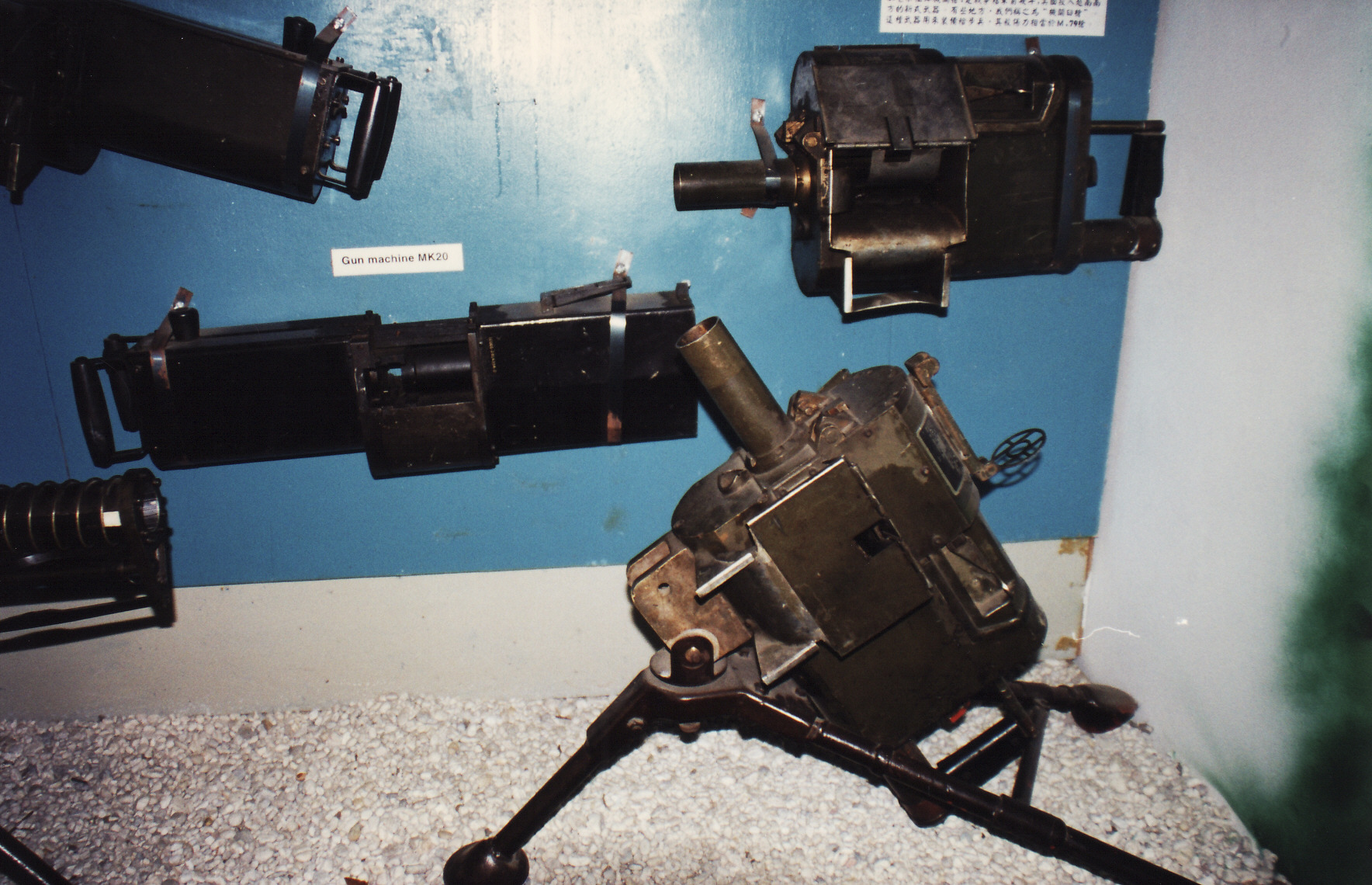
- Mk 18 Mod 0 grenade launchers (right and on tripod) at the War Remnants Museum in Ho Chi Minh City.
- Type: Grenade launcher
- Place of origin: United States

Service history
- In service: 1960s−1970s
- Used by: United States Navy; United States Army
- Wars: Vietnam War

Production history
- Designer: Honeywell Ordnance Division
- Manufacturer: Honeywell Ordnance Division
- Produced: 1965−1968
- No. built: 1,200

Specifications
- Mass: 17 lb (7.7 kg)
- Barrel length: 12 in (300 mm)
- Crew: 2
- Cartridge: 40×46mm grenade
- Caliber: 40 mm (1.6 in)
- Barrels: 1
- Action: Hand cranked, manual reloading
- Rate of fire: 250 rounds per minute
- Muzzle velocity: 215 ft/s (66 m/s)
- Effective firing range: 330 yd (300 m)
- Feed system: Belt
- Sights: Iron sights

The Mk 18 Mod 0 was a 40x46mm grenade launcher used by the United States Navy during the Vietnam War and also the last known hand crank operated firearm since the Gatling gun. It was replaced by the Mk 19 grenade launcher in service with the United States Armed Forces.

== Design ==
This weapon is manually-operated and belt-fed. The use of a split breech mechanism allowed the weapon to be simple. The Mk 18 Mod 0 featured a pistol grip, iron sights, and a control knob with three different settings: Safe, Load, and Fire. The only hand-cranked weapon to enter US military service since the Gatling Gun, two rounds were loaded and fired for every complete rotation, while spent cases were reinserted into the belt. The weapon was light, weighing only 17 pounds (7.7 kg), and had an effective range of 330 yards (300 m).

For watercraft 48-round ammunition boxes were issued while for ground operations a 24-round box was used. Belts had to be manually loaded by the crews before use and could be reused up to four or five times.

== Employment ==
About 1,200 launchers were produced primarily for the US Navy, while the US Army purchased 20 for testing.

The Mark 18 was used primarily on small boats or in fixed positions such as bunkers. The US Army mounted some on M151A1 Jeeps for patrols; their primary users were the so-called "river rats" and the SEALs. They could be mounted on M2HB, M60, M1919 tripods, or pintle mounts, but could not be fired without such a mount.

Armored Troop Carrier (LCM)s of the Mobile Riverine Force usually mounted two Mk 18s.

After the Vietnam War, the Mk 18 Mod 0 was replaced by the Mk 19 automatic grenade launcher.

== Gallery ==
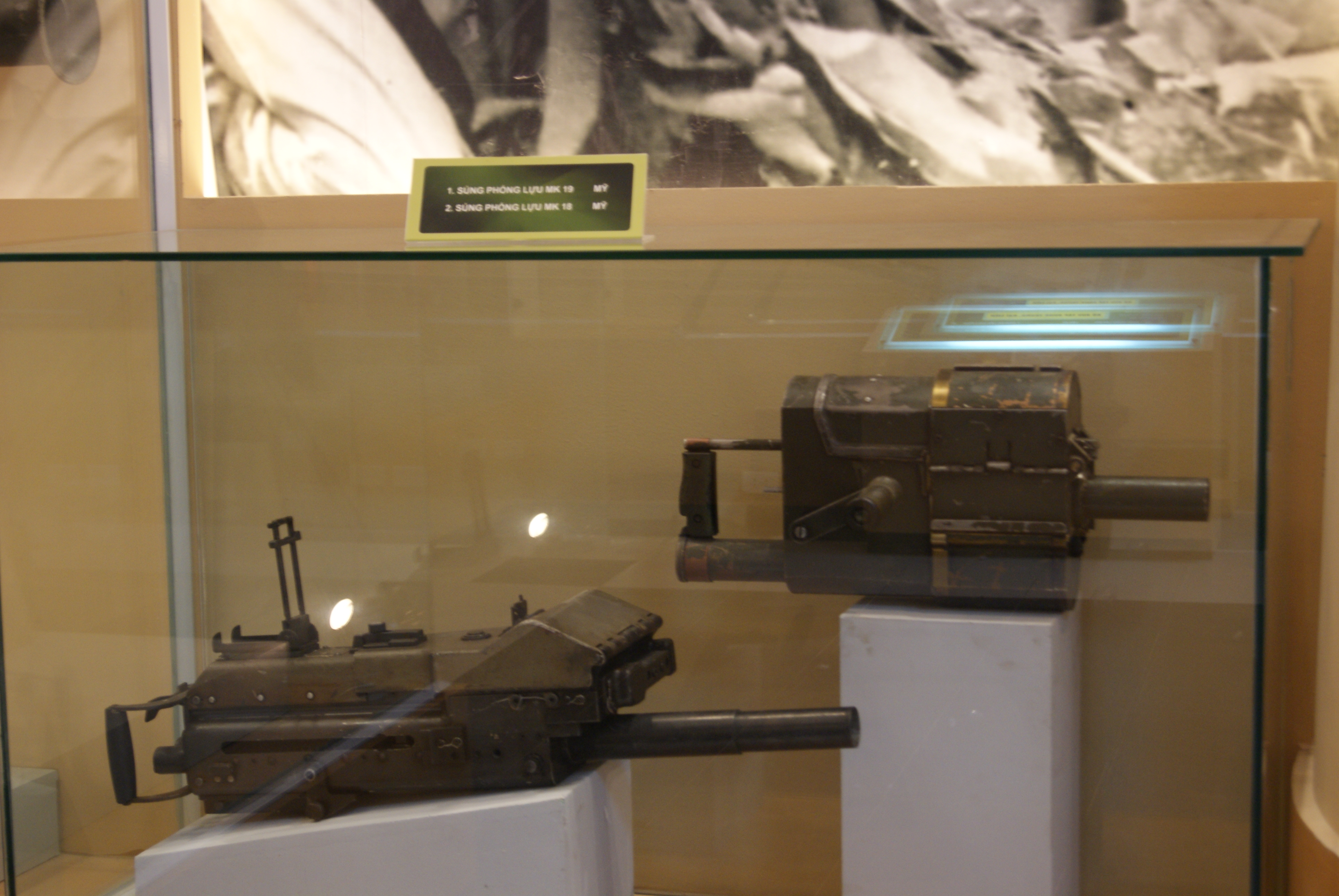
A Mk 18 grenade launcher (upper) and Mk 19 (lower) displayed at Hanoi Weaponry Museum

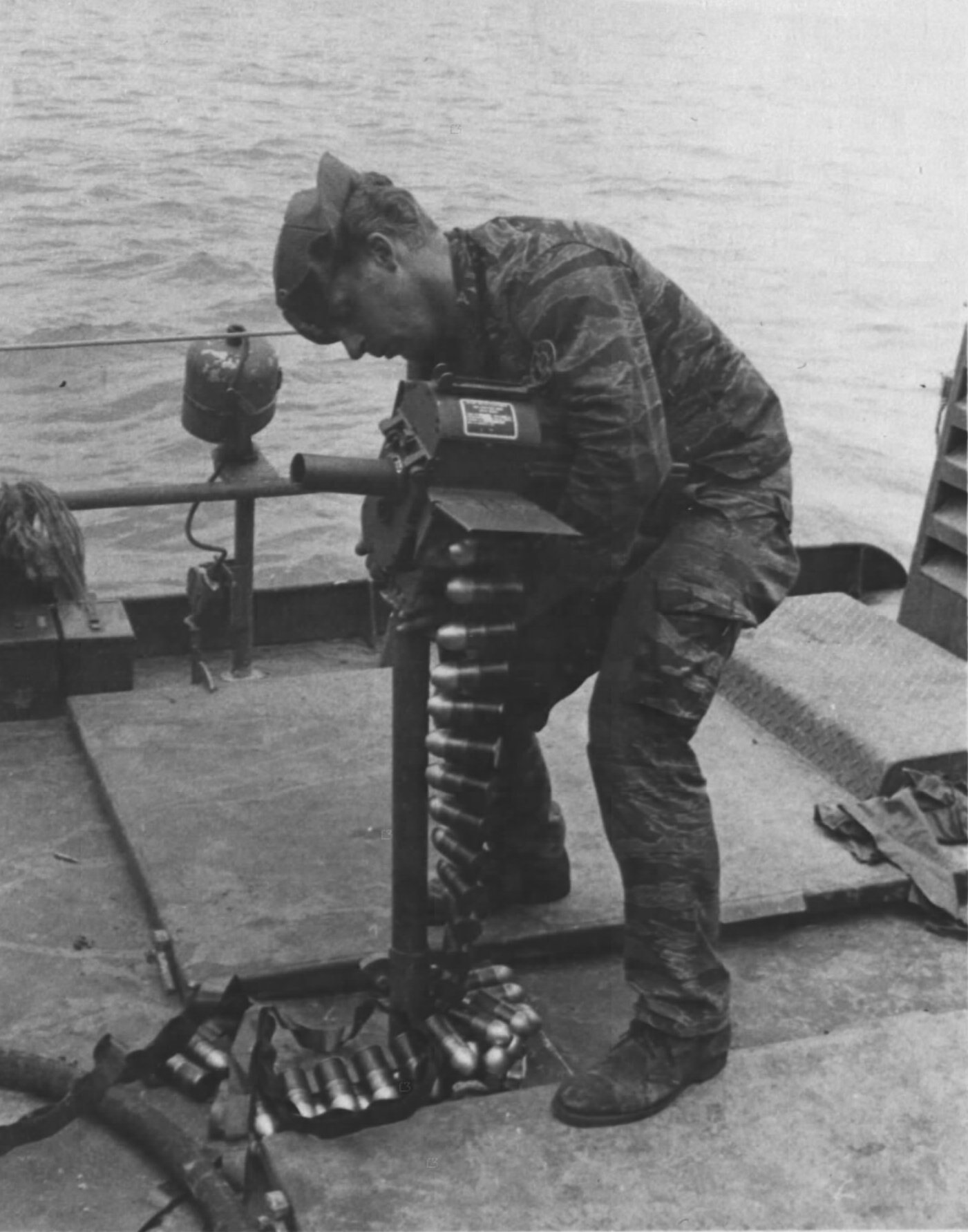
A Patrol Craft Fast crewman loads a Mk 18 Mod 0
