= P 5-class patrol vessel =

Class of ship

Class overview
- Name: P 5 class
- Builders: Marine Etablissement te Soerabaja, Soerabaja, Dutch East Indies
- Operators: Royal Netherlands Navy
- Preceded by: P 1 class
- Succeeded by: P 9 class
- In commission: 1939–1942
- Completed: 4

General characteristics
- Type: Patrol vessel
- Displacement: 26 t (26 long tons)
- Length: 18.90 m (62 ft 0 in)
- Beam: 5.56 m (18 ft 3 in)
- Draft: 1.22 m (4 ft 0 in)
- Propulsion: 1 shaft; 300 bhp (220 kW); Gray diesel engine
- Speed: 12.5 knots (23.2 km/h; 14.4 mph)
- Crew: 10
- Armament: 2 × single 12.7 mm machine guns

The P 5 class was a ship class of four patrol vessels that were built at the Marine Etablissement te Soerabaja in the Dutch East Indies for the Royal Netherlands Navy. They were an improved version of the P 1 class.

== Design and construction ==
Before the Japanese invasion of the Dutch East Indies the Royal Netherlands Navy produced several types of inshore craft for coastal patrol and anti-submarine duties. One of these types was the P 5-class patrol vessel, which was an improved version of the P 1 class. In comparison to the P 1 class the P-5 class was larger, faster and better armed. They measured 18.90 meters (62 ft 0 in) in length, had a beam of 5.56 m (18 ft 3 in) and a draft of 1.22 m (4 ft 0 in). They had a displacement of 26 metric tons (26 long tons). The vessels were equipped with a Gray diesel engine that could produce 300 brake horsepower (220 kW). This allowed the P 5s to reach a maximum speed of 12.5 knots (23.2 km/h; 14.4 mph). The P 5s had space for a complement of ten sailors and were armed with two 12.7-millimeter (0.50 in) machine guns.

The patrol vessels of the P 5 class were built in 1939 at the Marine Etablissement in Soerabaja, the Dutch East Indies.

== Service history ==
During the Dutch East Indies campaign all boats were scuttled by their crews to prevent capture.

== Boats ==
P 5-class data
Ship	Commissioned	Fate
P 5	1939	Scuttled by crew on 5 March 1942 at Pasoeroean.
P 6	1939	Scuttled by crew in March 1942 at most likely Tandjong Priok.
P 7	1939	Scuttled by crew on 8 March 1942 at Soerabaja.
P 8	1939	Scuttled by crew on 8 March 1942 at Soerabaja.

== Citations ==
=== Bibliography ===
- Gardiner, Robert; Chesneau, Roger, eds. (1980). Conway's All the World's Fighting Ships 1922–1946. London: Conway Maritime Press. ISBN 0-85177-146-7.
- Lenton, H.T. (1968). Royal Netherlands Navy. Navies of the Second World War. London: Macdonald & Co.
- Mark, Chris (1997). Schepen van de Koninklijke Marine in W.O. II (in Dutch). Alkmaar: De Alk. ISBN 90-6013-522-9.
- von Münching, L.L. (1978). Schepen van de Koninklijke Marine in de Tweede Wereldoorlog (in Dutch). Alkmaar: Alk. ISBN 90-6013-903-8.
- Raven, G.J.A., ed. (1988). De kroon op het anker: 175 jaar Koninklijke Marine (in Dutch). Amsterdam: De Bataafsche Leeuw. ISBN 90-6707-200-1.
