= Endeavour II =

Endeavour II may refer to one of these sailing vessels:

- Endeavour II (yacht), 1936-1968, contender in the 1937 America's Cup
- Endeavour II (barque), 1968-1971, wrecked on the coast of New Zealand
