= Monitor (Vietnam War) =

Type of river patrol craft

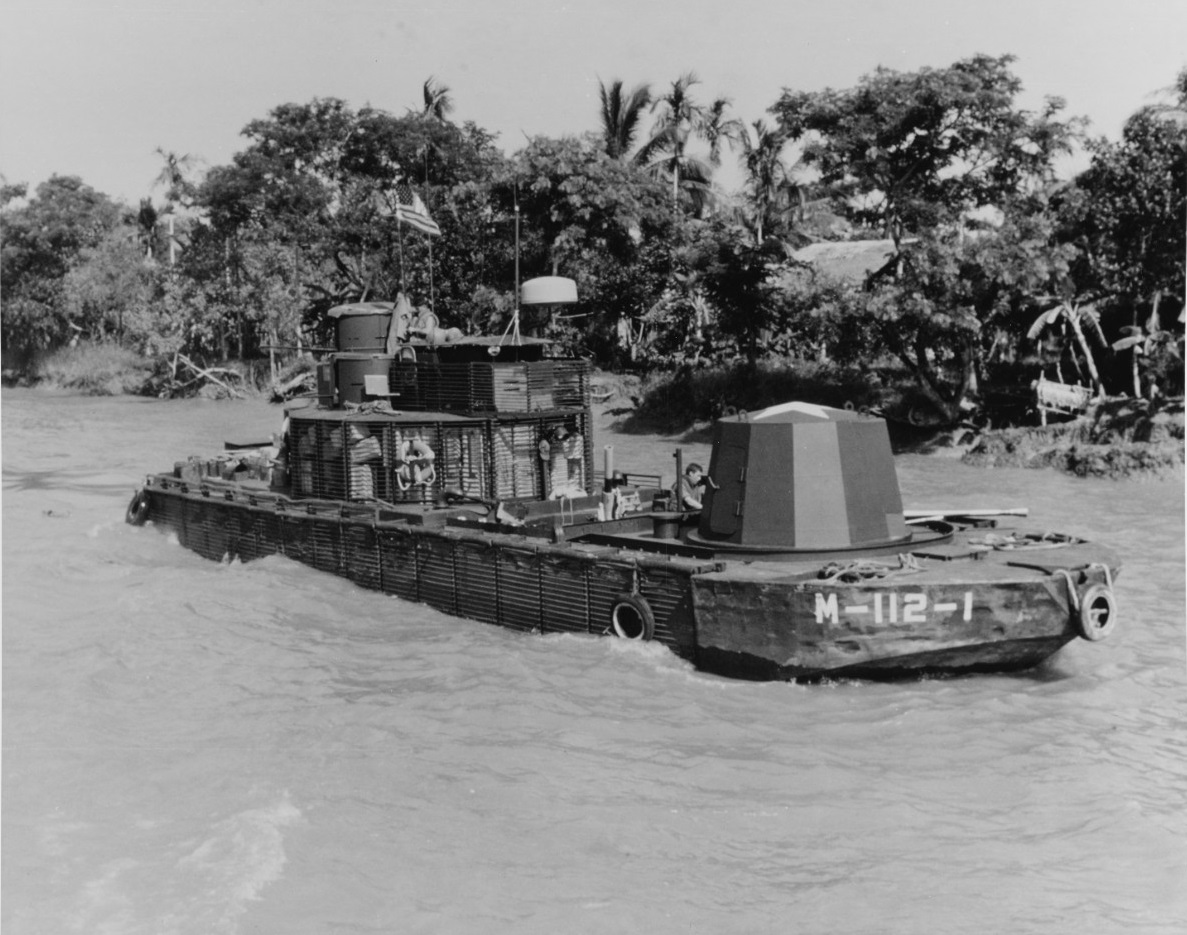
- Monitor in 1968

Class overview
- Name: Monitor
- Operators: United States Navy; (South Vietnam) Republic of Vietnam Navy; (Khmer Republic) Khmer National Navy

General characteristics
- Type: River monitor
- Displacement: 66 short tons (60 t)
- Length: 60.5 ft (18.4 m)
- Beam: 17.5 ft (5.3 m)
- Draft: 3.3 ft (1.0 m)
- Installed power: 2×225 hp (168 kW)
- Propulsion: two Gray Marine 6-71 diesel engines
- Speed: 8 knots (15 km/h)
- Range: 110 nautical miles (200 km; 130 mi)
- Complement: 11
- Armament: one 40mm cannon; one 81mm mortar; one 20mm cannon; two .50-caliber machine guns
- Armor: XAR-30-type steel and bar armor

The Monitor was a highly modified version of the LCM-6 developed by the United States Navy for use as a mobile riverine assault boat in the Vietnam War. Another version served as a command and control boat (CCB or Charlie boat).

== History ==
The Monitor was similar in many respects to the Armored Troop Carrier (ATC). The Monitor was 60.5 feet (18.4 m) long with a 17.5 feet (5.3 m) beam and a 3.3 ft (1.0 m) draft. Displacing 66 short tons (60 t), it could achieve a top speed of 8 knots (15 km/h; 9.2 mph) with its twin Gray Marine 225-hp diesel engines, however armor and weapons reduced the effective speed to 4-7 knots. High-hardness XAR-30-type steel and bar armor provided ballistic protection for the crew from rounds up to .50-caliber in size and offered some protection against high explosive antitank rounds up to 57mm. Below-waterline hull blisters provided added hull protection, minimized draft, and increased stability.

The chief difference between the Monitor and the ATC could be seen in the well deck area. Monitors had a rounded bow as opposed to a drop-down ramp, making them slightly longer than the ATC (60.5 feet vs 56 feet). They also mounted additional weaponry—a 40mm gun turret forward and an 81mm mortar amidships—and carried four additional sailors to help man those weapons and operate the boat. The 81mm mortar was the only indirect-fire weapon fielded by River Flotilla 1 and, with the assistance of an artillery observer, could hit targets up to 4,000 yards (3,700 m) away. Like any mortar, however, this one had a low muzzle velocity, making it ineffective against hardened enemy positions such as bunkers. The Monitor's main weapon was the 40mm cannon—a very accurate direct-fire weapon that packed a tremendous punch. The 40mm cannon was the only weapon in the Mobile Riverine Force's inventory capable of smashing mud bunkers, but the rounds tended to damage rather than destroy these fortifications, allowing the Vietcong to quickly repair and reuse them for future ambushes. The 40mm guns also had such great range that Monitor crews had to take great care not to hit friendly forces or civilians when employing them.

== Variants ==
=== Command and Communications Boat (CCB) ===
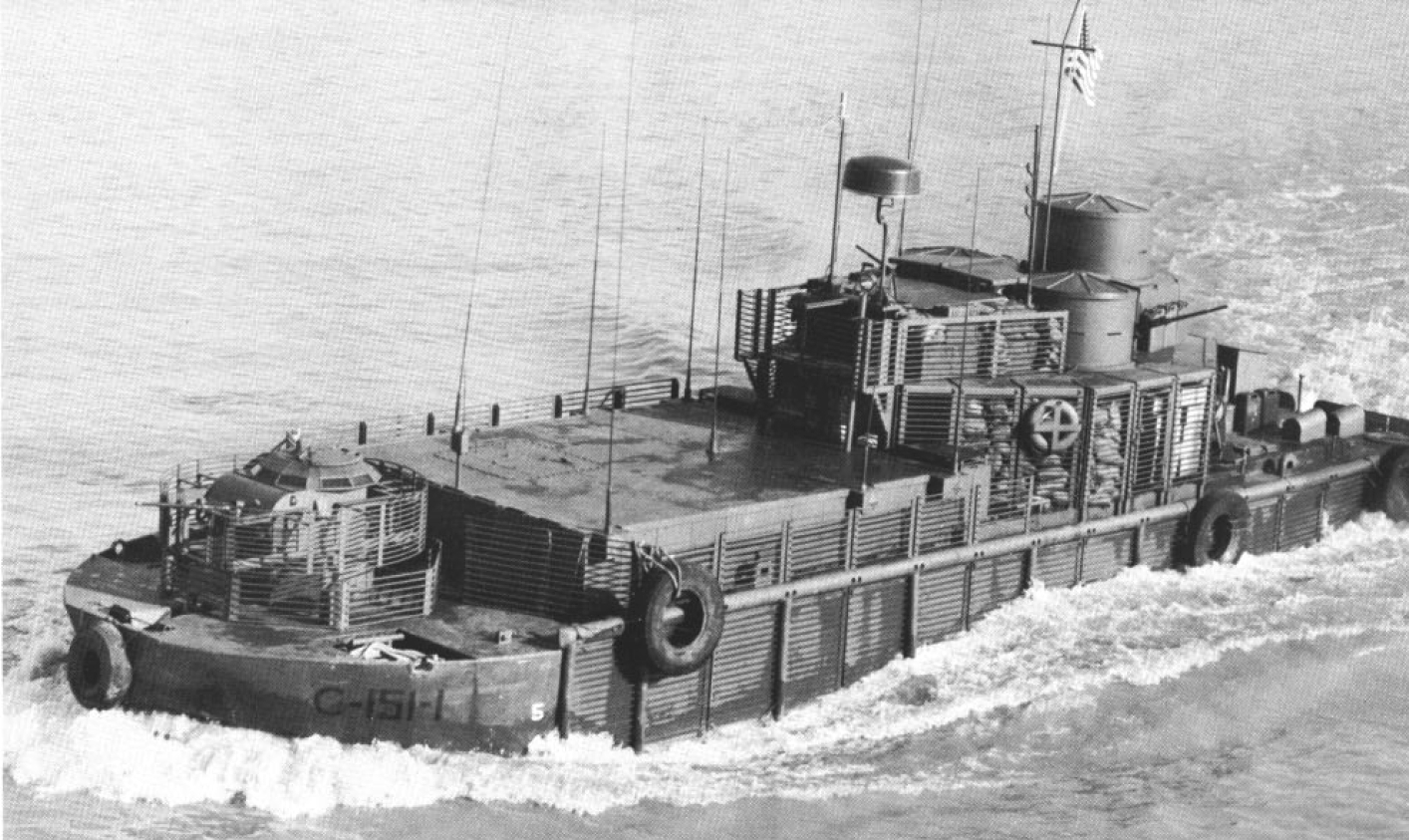
CCB in 1969

The Command and Communications Boat (CCB or Charlie Boat) served as flagships for river squadron and river division commanders as well as command posts for Army battalion commanders. They were similar to Monitors except they contained a communications suite amidships rather than an 81mm mortar. The communications suite had five AN/VRC-46, three AN/GRC 106, one AN/PRC-25, and one AN/ARC-27 radios—giving it the ability to communicate with units on land, air and sea. The CCB also featured Raytheon Pathfinder 1900 radar and a Decca navigation installation.

By the end of 1967 each river assault squadron contained 26 ATCs, 16 Assault Support Patrol Boats (ASPBs), five Monitors, two CCBs and one refueller (a modified LCM).

=== Zippo Monitor ===
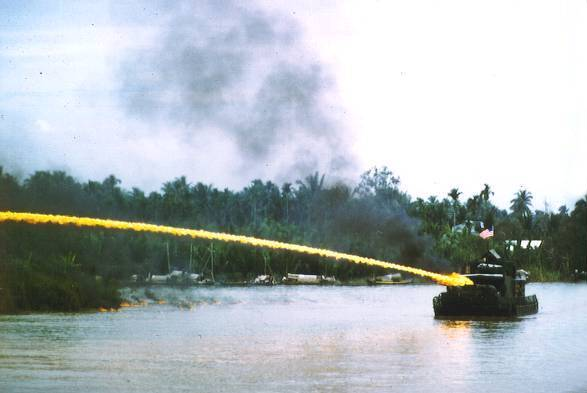
Zippo Monitor in action in Vietnam.

In mid-1967, when the Vietcong constructed bunkers capable of withstanding 40mm rounds, RIVFLOT 1 began exploring the idea of deploying flamethrowers on riverboats as a potential bunker buster. On 4 October, the M132A1, an Army flamethrower vehicle, was shoehorned into an ATC. Commanders hoped the M132A1's 32-second burst and 150 yards (140 m) range would not only neutralize enemy bunkers but also deter river ambushes. Tests proved satisfactory, but the M132A1, weighing 23,000 pounds (10,000 kg), was too heavy for the Navy's needs. Instead, lighter M10-8 flamethrowers were installed on six Monitors delivered in May 1968. Nicknamed "Zippo" after the popular cigarette lighter, these Monitors mounted two M10-8 flamethrowers, each with an effective range of 200–300 yards (180–270 m). With 1,350 US gallons (5,100 L; 1,120 imp gal) of napalm fuel, the M10-8 could lay down a sheet of flame for 225 seconds. Sailors would make napalm by mixing a powder consisting of the coprecipitated aluminium salts of naphthenic and palmitic acids with gasoline. Compressed air propelled the napalm through the flamethrower, and a gasoline lighter acted as the trigger.

=== Howitzer Monitor ===
In order to provide heavier firepower 8 Monitors were produced with an M49 105 mm howitzer mounted in a T172 turret.

== Operators ==
- United States - U.S. Navy
- South Vietnam - Republic of Vietnam Navy
- Khmer Republic - Khmer National Navy

== Survivors ==
The only surviving boat is CCB #C-18 on display at Naval Amphibious Base Coronado, California.
