= River Battalion (Croatia) =

- Riječna bojna
- Active: 2007-Present
- Country: Croatia
- Branch: Croatian Army
- Type: Brown-water navy
- Role: Control of inland waterways
- Part of: Croatian Army Training and Doctrine Command
- Headquarters: Vrbik Barracks, Osijek
- Nicknames: Danube Wolves (Croatian: Vukovi s Dunava)

Commanders
- Current Commander: Major (OF-3) Ivica Miložić

The Croatian River Battalion (Croatian: Riječna bojna) is an inland brown water naval unit of the Croatian Army headquartered at the Vrbik Barracks in Osijek, Croatia. Located inland on the Drava River, the River Battalion is a component of the Croatian Land Forces and was established in 2007.

== History ==
In its current form, the River Battalion is the successor of three inland brown water naval units established during the Croatian War of Independence (1991–1995). The River Company (Riječna satnija), 3rd "A" Brigade Croatian National Guard (ZNG), established on 28 June 1991, the Drava River War Fleet (Riječne ratne flotile Drava - RRF Drava) established on October 1, 1991, the First River Detachment - River War Fleet (RRF) Sisak (1. riječni zdrug - Riječna Ratna Flotila (RRF) Sisak) ZNG and Second River Detachment - River War Fleet (RRF) Osijek (2. riječni zdrug - Riječna Ratna Flotila (RRF) Osijek). For the duration of the Croatian War of Independence, the Croatian river units were tasked reconnaissance, supply, and transport duties on the Drava and Danube Rivers for the Croatian armed forces. In August 1991, boats and barges of the Croatian River Company assisted in the rescue of 1,500 civilians from Aljmaš, Dalj and Erdut.

== Command and organization ==
As part of the Croatian Army, the River Battalion is attached to the Engineering Regiment (Karlovac) of the Croatian Army Training and Doctrine Command "Fran Krsto Frankopan" (Osijek). It is composed of five organizational units:

1. Headquarters
2. Command Platoon
3. Riverboat Company
4. Mine and Countermine Platoon
5. Logistics Platoon

== Equipment ==
- OB-91 - River patrol boat
- OB-92 - Decommissioned? Serving as a barge tug Zibel owned by the Danube Lloyd Company, Sisak.
- OB-93 Šokadija (former Yugoslav Navy RML-307 Slavonac) - River patrol boat built in 1952 at Mačvanska Mitrovica, Yugoslavia. During the siege of Vukovar, Šokadija made a safe voyage from Vukovar, where she had been moored since the start of hostilities, to Sisak, via the Danube and Sava rivers. From 1991 to 2001 she was part of the First River Association and is the first ship of the Croatian River Battalion. Šokadija underwent refit and was returned to the Croatian Armed Forces on 6 June 2003.

The river battalion also employs a number of inflatable Arimar boats and aluminum landing craft.
