= Gray (automobile) =

Defunct American motor vehicle manufacturer

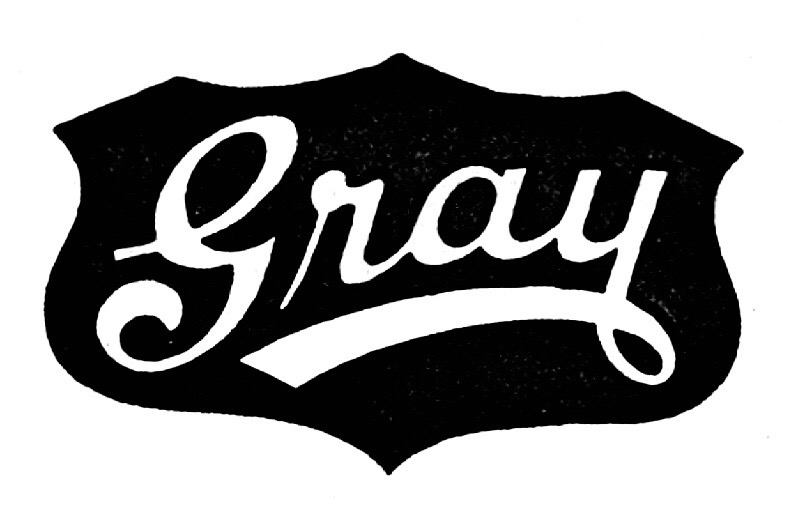
Gray Company sign

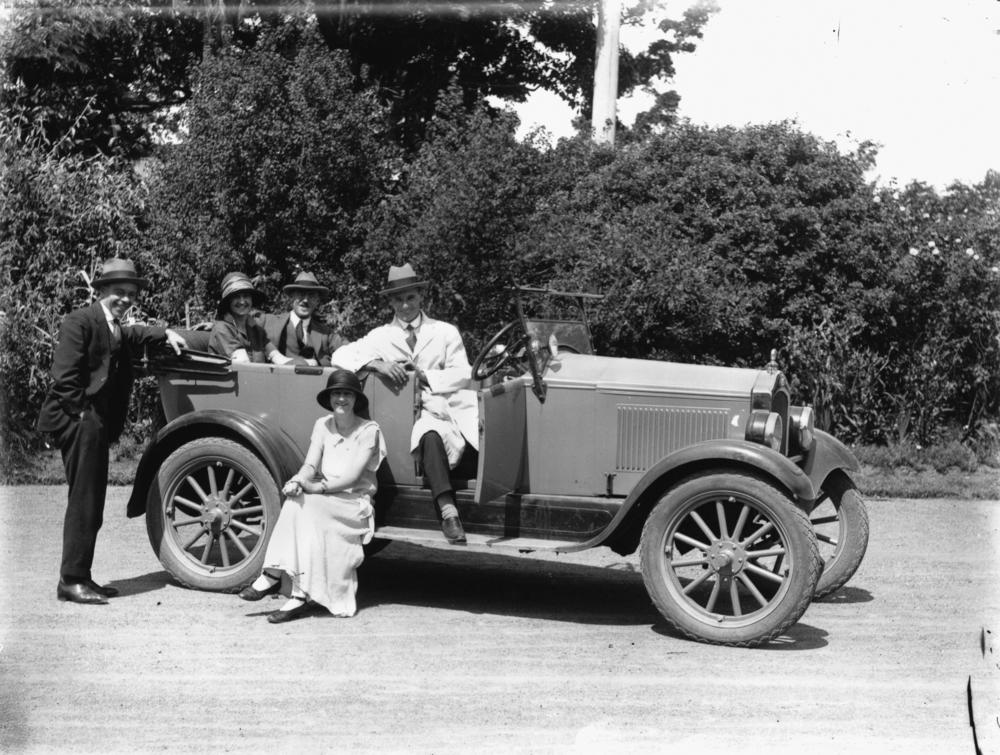
1925 Gray tourer with passengers, Brisbane.

The Gray was an automobile manufactured in Detroit, Michigan by the Gray Motor Corporation from 1922 to 1926. The Gray Motor Corporation produced two models, the Star and Gray. They were an attempt to win a share of the mass market dominated by Ford Model T. Many of the employees of Gray, were former Ford employees, including the head of Gray Corporation, Frank L. Klingensmith, who was the former vice president and treasurer of Ford Motor Company. The vehicles had similar features of engine and chassis to the Model T. The engine had a side-valve, four-cylinder 2706 cc configuration. The bore was 92.1 mm and the stroke was 101.6 mm. The suspension used a conventional quarter-elliptical spring at the front and rear. Front-wheeled brakes were offered in 1926, the last year of production. They planned on production of nearly a quarter of a million a year the first year, but those volumes were never realized. The touring car cost $490, and the coach was sold at $760, the first year of production. The Gray 1 1/4 t truck had a four-cylinder engine with 2706 cc. The bore was 92.1 mm and the stroke was 101.6 mm. The power was 21 Hp.
