= Gašinci Military Training Grounds =

Gašinci military training grounds
- Vojni poligon Gašinci
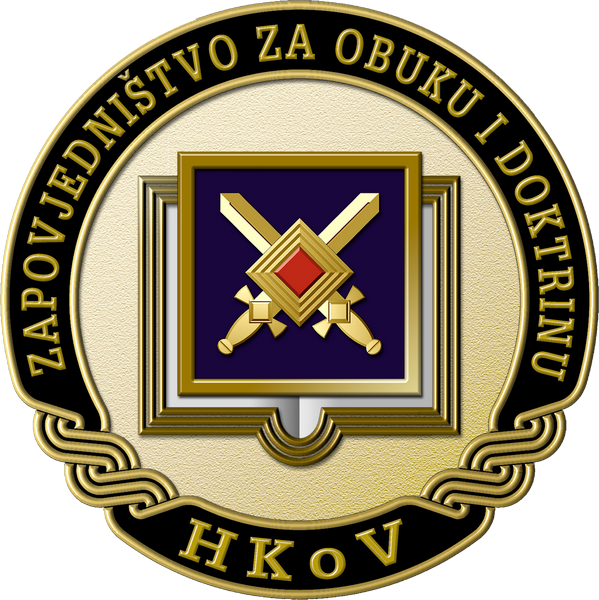
- Badge of the Croatian Army Training and Doctrine Command

Site information
- Controlled by: Croatian Army

Location
- Coordinates: 45.3305°N 18.2842°E

Site history
- In use: 1991 – present

Garrison information
- Garrison: Tank Battalion "Kune" (Gašinci)

The "Gašinci" Military Training Grounds (formerly the "Sutjeska" Military Training Grounds") is a Croatian Army training base located 10 kilometers from Đakovo, in the region of Slavonia, Croatia. The complex is a part of the Croatian Army Training and Doctrine Command.

== History ==
Prior to being used by the Croatian Army, the training grounds were built and used by the Yugoslav People's Army (JNA). Captured by Croatian forces in the early days of the Croatian War of Independence, from 1991-95 training grounds served as the Croatian Army's primary live-fire training centre.

In 2013, a 21-year-old soldier Marko Zalović was killed when he was run over by a M-84 main battle tank that unexpectedly veered from its route and killed the young soldier who was in a trench by the road.

== Geography and Layout ==
Training grounds covers 32 square kilometres and is divided into two parts. The eastern portion is dedicated to administrative command buildings, training facilities and sports fields; while the western area, which covers 21 square kilometres, is a dedicated training area.

Smaller than the ''Eugen Kvaternik'' military training ground near Slunj, the ''Gašinci'' complex is best suited for training individuals and smaller groups at the company and battalion level. The complex is capable of providing logistical support for exercises and hosting a variety of training events for the firing of weapons, including small arms, anti-tank rockets, artillery and armoured vehicles
