= Endeavour II (barque) =

Barque, 1968–1971, wrecked on the coast of New Zealand

History

Canada
- Name: Monte Cristo; Endeavour II
- Owner: Ron Craig
- Launched: 1968
- Fate: Wrecked 22 February 1971 34.523247°S 173.009949°E

General characteristics
- Length: 140 feet (43 m) oa
- Propulsion: GMC Jimmy 6-71 diesel
- Sail plan: Three-masted barque

Endeavour II was a three-masted auxiliary barque built in Vancouver in 1968 and originally named Monte Cristo. She was built along the lines of the brigantine Albatross as published in Uffa Fox's Second Book of Boats.

In late February 1971 she was embayed during a full gale and, after attempting to beat her way out for several days, on 22 February was driven onto the bar of Parengarenga Harbour, a few miles south of North Cape, New Zealand, and wrecked.

== Construction ==
Her hull was constructed of mahogany planking on heavy fir frames with spars of Sitka spruce. Her three-sectioned mainmast rose 84 feet (26 m) from deck to truck. Her deck measured 94 feet (29 m) which bowsprit and jibboom extended to almost 140 feet (43 m) length overall.

She was rigged as a three-masted barque with square sails on the mainmast and foremast, a gaff rigged fore and aft spanker on the mizzenmast, four jibs and a variety of staysails for a maximum of seventeen sails set totalling 9,000 square feet (840 m^{2}). The sails were controlled by around 5 miles (8.0 km) of running and standing rigging, all of natural manila rope and galvanised wire. There were no mechanical winches, all hauling being by block and tackle and man power.

The auxiliary engine was a GMC Jimmy 6-71 diesel. The only electronic aid to navigation was a marine VHF radio.

== Ownership ==
Originally owned and built by a consortium of business men (Fred Kolowrat, Frank Perner, Alex Brigola) keen to recreate the great days of sail she quickly became the sole property of Ron Craig, a Canadian businessman.

== Voyages ==
Initially, as Monte Cristo, she worked her way down the western seaboard of the United States giving costumed on-board tours to paying visitors at each port of call. On 22 July 1969 she had to be towed into Port Townsend, Washington in thick fog after suffering engine trouble. She had a number of movie roles and on 9 November was briefly involved in the occupation of Alcatraz.

After being renamed Endeavour II, she sailed across the Pacific Ocean to Sydney to take part in the bicentenary re-enactment on 29 April 1970 of James Cook's landing at Botany Bay, Sydney. She subsequently cruised up the eastern seaboard of Australia to Brisbane, giving costumed on-board tours to paying visitors at each port of call, and then sailed for Auckland, New Zealand, under American skipper Jeff Berry.

This proved to be her final voyage and she encountered a number of delays. Soon after sailing she was becalmed and carried southwards by a freak seventy-mile-a-day current. In the Tasman Sea the crew sighted distress flares and searched for over twelve hours without success; the consequent depletion of fuel reserves was to prove crucial later. On rounding North Cape she encountered a full gale and failed to make the intended Houhora Harbour.

== Wreck ==
After rounding North Cape, New Zealand, Endeavour II found it impossible to keep position in 40-knot easterly winds when fuel ran out, and she tried to anchor. Her anchors dragged and she was driven onto the bar of Parengarenga Harbour, a few miles south of North Cape, in the early hours of 22 February 1971. By 1pm she had settled on her side and began to break up. The crew of thirteen men and one woman reached the shore without loss.

She was the first square-rigged sailing vessel wrecked on the New Zealand coast for more than fifty years. Her masts are preserved, fitted to the converted sugar barge Tui in Paihia.
