= P 1-class patrol vessel =

Class of ship

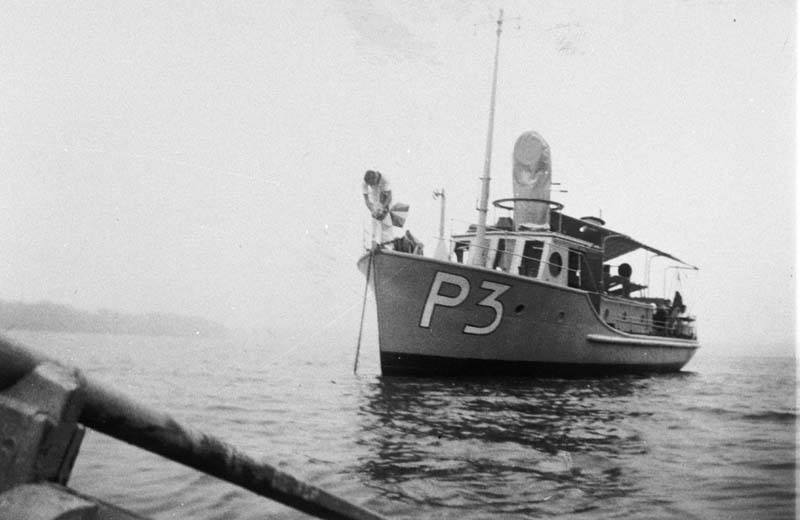
- HNLMS P3 in 1940

Class overview
- Name: P 1 class
- Builders: Marine Etablissement te Soerabaja, Soerabaja
- Operators: Royal Netherlands Navy
- Succeeded by: P 5 class
- Completed: 4

General characteristics
- Type: Patrol vessel
- Displacement: 23 t (23 long tons)
- Length: 15.85 m (52 ft 0 in)
- Beam: 4 m (13 ft 1 in)
- Draft: 1.32 metres (4 ft 4 in)
- Propulsion: 1 propellers; 110 hp (82 kW); Werkspoor motor
- Speed: 12 knots (22 km/h; 14 mph)
- Crew: 10
- Armament: 2 x 7.7 mm machine guns

The P 1 class was a ship class of four patrol vessels that were built at the Marine Etablissement te Soerabaja in the Dutch East Indies. They were the first patrol vessels that were built in the Dutch East Indies for the Royal Netherlands Navy.

== Design and construction ==
The P 1-class patrol vessels were designed to be fast boats that could be built for 35,000 Dutch guilders each. However, when the boats were taken into service they could not reach the planned speed of 15 miles per hour (13 kn; 24 km/h). The design was therefore deemed a failure and a new design was made that would result in the P 5 class.

== Service history ==
The P 1-class patrol vessels were originally built to patrol the sea nearby Soerabaja and keep it clear for seaplanes of Qantas. They were to be stationed at Koepang, Bima, Soerabaja and Tandjong Priok.

During the Dutch East Indies campaign most boats were either scuttled by the crew to prevent capture or sunk by the Japanese. Nonetheless, P 1 was captured by the Japanese, while P 4 was sunk by her crew but later raised and also captured by the Japanese.

Both P 1 and P 4 managed to survive the war and were taken into service of the Dienst der Scheepsvaart (DvS) as Anna and Betsy and later in 1947 they served again in the Royal Netherlands Navy as RP 132 and RP 133. After the Indonesian War of Independence ended RP 132 was transferred in 1950 to Indonesia.

== Ships in class ==
P 1-class data
Ship	Commissioned	Fate
P 1	1939	Sunk in 1942 and later raised by the Japanese. Found in 1945 after the war and served as Anna in the Dienst der Scheepsvaart. In 1947 returned in service of the Royal Netherlands Navy as RP 132. Transferred to Indonesia in 1950.
P 2	1939	Scuttled or destroyed by crew to prevent capture.
P 3	1939	Destroyed by crew to prevent capture.
P 4	1939	Scuttled in 1942 and later raised by the Japanese. Found in 1945 after the war and served as Betsy in the Dienst der Scheepsvaart. Returned in service of the Royal Netherlands Navy as RP 133 in 1947.
