= Croatian Army Training and Doctrine Command =

Training and Doctrine Command "Fran Krsto Frankopan"
- Zapovjedništvo za obuku i doktrinu HKoV-a "Fran Krsto Frankopan"
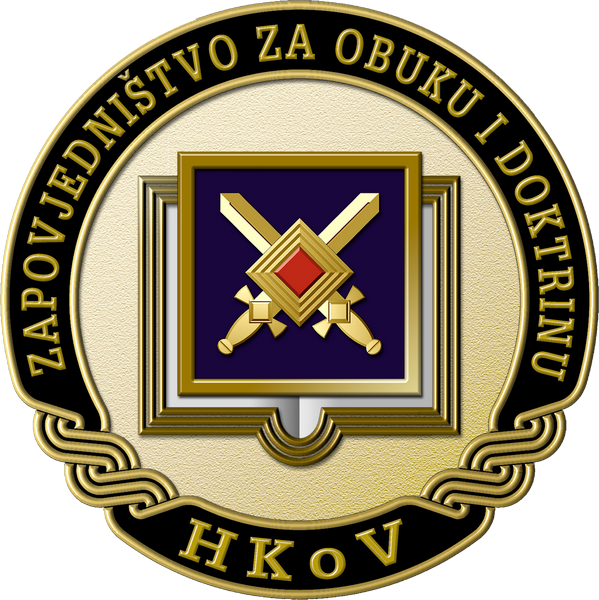
- Badge of the Training and Doctrine Command
- Active: 2007 – present
- Country: Croatia
- Branch: Croatian Army
- Type: Military education and training
- Command HQ: HKoV Training and Doctrine Command Dobriše Cesarića 1 31000 Osijek
- Mottos: 'Knowledge overcomes fear' 'Znanje pobjeđuje strah'

Commanders
- Commander: Brigadir Željko Ljubas

The Croatian Army Training and Doctrine Command "Fran Krsto Frankopan" (Croatian: Zapovjedništvo za obuku i doktrinu HKoV-a "Fran Krsto Frankopan" (ZOD)) is the primary military education and training organization of the Croatian Army established in July 2007. On 1 August 2019, Colonel Zlatko Radočaj took over as the current commander of the Croatian Army Training and Doctrine Command.

== Mission ==
The mission of the Training and Doctrine Command is the "development and production of doctrinal publications and a complete training system, management of institutional training, provision of training resources, organization and training of contract reserves, collection, analysis and evaluation of lessons learned, all with the aim of raising the level of training success, equipping and the operational readiness of the individual and the unit could be distinguished as some.

By establishing a Training and Doctrine Command in one place, training is designed, created and implemented. The Training and Doctrine Command also develops all doctrinal publications, establishes training standards, thus directing the future of Croatian Army. Training and Doctrine Command is responsible for the development and development of the Croatian Army gender doctrine, and participates in the development and development of the Croatian Army tactical doctrine, the OSRH Training Doctrine, and the OSRH Joint Doctrine. By bringing all training activities together in one place, the quality of the training has been significantly improved.

The Training and Doctrine Command also provides training to members of other branches of the Croatian Armed Forces, and cooperates with the HVU in the field of training. Training and Doctrine Command also conducts about 50 courses, of which the vast majority of courses have a selection character. These are basic military training courses, the development of basic leadership skills, and a basic course in the use of SALW. As part of specialist military training, he conducts training and courses in all combat and combat support types. A large number of courses are conducted as part of functional training. In our Department of Training and Doctrine, each gender has its own experts who can answer questions about gender development at any time, be it human, material, training or doctrinal potential.

== Organization ==
Training and Doctrine Command consists of ten organizational units. The House of Commands is in charge of the smooth functioning of the Training and Doctrine Command. The Training and Doctrine Command has four centers that carry out its tasks. The Požega Basic Training Center is in charge of training volunteer conscripts, cadet selection camps, they also conduct a Core Leadership Development Course, and their instructors also participate in other Training and Doctrine Command training tasks.

The combat training center at the Eugen Kvaternik military training ground in Slunj is tasked with conducting all training activities and monitoring the exercise units in combat conditions with ground exercises. It is done with the help of the MILES 2000 system, and after the completion of each training activity, the unit that participated in the training on the ground receives the so-called Bring the package home with everything the unit did during the analysis exercise.

The Training and Doctrine Command also includes a Simulation Center located on the HVU. It is equipped with the best simulation system in existence, JCATS.

Rakitje has a Training Center for International Military Operations, which runs a series of courses on NATO and UN programs and is indispensable in preparing our and other members of the AF of other countries to participate in international missions. Intensive work is being done to transform it into a regional center.

In addition to the center, there are five regiments within the Training and Doctrine Command, which deploy the Croatian Army active reserve, namely: Infantry Regiment, Artillery-Rocket Regiment, Engineering, Logistics and Air Defense Regiment . Their task is twofold. They are responsible for conducting specialist training and functional courses, and are responsible for setting up and maintaining an active reserve.

The Training and Doctrine Command also includes the military fields "Gasinci" and "Eugen Kvaternik" Slunj. In addition to managing them, the Training and Doctrine Command creates their appearance, creates new training infrastructure and prescribes how it will be implemented.

Croatian Army Training and Doctrine Command

- Command (Osijek)
- Command Company (Osijek)
- Infantry Regiment (Gašinci)
- Artillery-Rocket Regiment (Bjelovar)
- Air Defense Regiment (Zadar)
- Engineering Regiment (Karlovac)
  - River Battalion (Osijek)
- Logistics Regiment (Benkovac)

Military Training Grounds

- Gašinci (Gašinci)
- Eugen Kvaternik (Slunj)

Training Centres

- Basic Training Center (Požega)
- Combat Training Center (Slunj)
- Simulation Centre (Lucko Zagreb)
- International Military Operations Training Centre (Rakitje Zagreb)
