= Prairie Queen tractors =

Prairie Queen tractors were made in America in the early 1920s by the Prairie Queen Manufacturing Company based in Temple, Texas. None are believed to remain in existence.

== Founders ==
The Company was founded by John Z Roop, J Walter Payne, and W A Harrell at the start of 1920.

=== Roop (President) ===
Roop was born in Texas in 1895 and had initially trained as a vehicle mechanic after leaving high school. In 1916 he attended the Armour Institute and the Art Institute of Chicago specialising in electrical equipment and mechanical design. On his return to Temple he went into partnership with J Walter Payne in the firm Roop and Payne. In June 1917 Roop enlisted in the army and was Chief Mechanic in the Truck Train of the Motor Transport Corp, rising to the position of Commanding Officer of the 15th Division's Truck Train based at San Antonio, Houston, and the Mexican border. He returned to the repair shop partnership with Payne in February 1919.

=== Payne (Vice President) ===
Payne had been associated with tractors since about 1900. Initially working with steam tractors. In about 1910 he began selling tractors and farm machinery; and in 1912 repairing them. He was also a Ford mechanic and salesman for 5 years in Temple. In 1917 Roop and Payne obtained an agency for selling a tractor attachment for automobiles. The idea was that once attached to the car it could be used as a tractor. If the car was required for normal use the attachment was removed. Experience with this attachment led to the idea to develop a lightweight tractor. A demonstration model was built which evoked considerable public interest. The tractor was called The Tom Cat and became the fore-runner of the Prairie Queen Tractor. Roop and Payne was sold to F L and B M Batts, becoming Batts Brothers Garage in 1920.

=== Harrell (Secretary/Treasurer) ===
Harrell was the advertising manager for the Temple Daily Telegram. Harrell established Prairie Queen Tractors office at 19 West Avenue A, Temple. The Tom Cat was placed on display there.

== Development ==
Roop and Payne's work with a wide variety of makes and models of tractor had led to their development of The Tom Cat. This tractor served as the prototype for the Prairie Queen. A company was created in January 1920. $50,000 worth of capital to manufacture the tractors was sought. Its office, by May 1920, was given as the Brady and Black Hardware building, which was on the corner of East Central Avenue and South Second Street. There is a post card of the Brady and Black building in the early 1920s showing a car with rows of tractors either side. The tractors all appear to be Samson Model M's. The Gray Motor Company's Victory engine was selected to power the tractor. The Victory engine was considered to be simple and reliable with higher power at low revs.

Construction of the first Prairie Queen took place at the Forsyth Engineering Company. It was first publicly demonstrated at the Woodlawn Flying Field west of Bird's Creek on the Temple-Belton Pike on May 29, 1920. The location is now the intersection of Interstate 35 and South West H K Dodgen Loop, and marked by a commemorative plaque for the Texas Aero Corporation hangar. Demonstrations of the machine were met with enthusiasm.

An assembly plant was constructed near the junction of the Katy and Santa Fe railways at Temple.

== Model 8-16 ==
The Prairie Queen 8-16 tractor used a Gray Motor Company Victory engine. According to a newspaper article when it was first mooted, the tractor was to be assembled by sourcing parts from a number of specialized manufacturers. They were painted blue with the motor and interior gray. The tractor was to be sold for $765. The first two tractors were sold to Frank Bros of Lampasas and Woodward & Munger of Jarrell respectively. The next two were to be displayed in Burnet County and at Coryell County. The number built is unknown, but is at least 5 from the newspaper reports of the time.

== Demise ==
On September 8, 1921 Brady and Black were only advertising Samson tractors for sale. The Samson tractors cost about $650 in 1920, making the Prairie Queen an expensive option. Production ceased in 1922. Roop resigned as President of the company in March 1922 with Payne acting in his place. The company moved its manufacturing from the old Fundary Building between the MK and T railway and Santa Fe railway crossing to the Jenkins building at 209 West Central Avenue in August and began to undertake general repair work on tractors and motor vehicles to supplement its income. The last advertisement for the tractor appeared on 17 December 1922.
