= LCVP (United States) =

US-built landing craft used extensively in amphibious landings in World War II

- LCVP side elevation and plan

Class overview
- Builders: Higgins Industries and others
- Operators: United States Navy; United States Coast Guard; Maritime Squadron of the Armed Forces of Malta; Republic of China Navy; French Navy; Royal Navy
- Built: 1942–1945
- Completed: More than 23,358

General characteristics
- Type: Landing craft
- Displacement: 18,000 lb (8,200 kg) light
- Length: 36 ft 3 in (11.05 m)
- Beam: 10 ft 10 in (3.30 m)
- Draft: 3 ft (0.91 m) aft; 2 ft 2 in (0.66 m) forward
- Propulsion: Gray Marine 6-71 Diesel Engine, 225 hp (168 kW) or Hall-Scott gasoline engine, 250 hp (186 kW)
- Speed: 12 knots (14 mph; 22 km/h)
- Capacity: 6,000 lb (2,700 kg) vehicle or 8,100 lb (3,700 kg) general cargo
- Troops: 36 troops
- Crew: 4: Coxswain, engineer, bowman, sternman
- Armament: 2 × .30 cal. (7.62 mm) Browning machine guns

The Landing Craft Vehicle, Personnel (LCVP) or Higgins boat was a landing craft used extensively by the Allied forces in amphibious landings in World War II. Typically constructed from plywood, this shallow-draft, barge-like boat could ferry a roughly platoon-sized complement of 36 men to shore at 12 knots (14 mph; 22 km/h). Men generally entered the boat by climbing down a cargo net hung from the side of their troop transport; they exited by charging down the boat's lowered bow ramp.

Designer Andrew Higgins based it on boats made for operating in swamps and marshes. More than 23,358 were built, by Higgins Industries and licensees.

Taking the last letter of the LCVP designation, sailors often nicknamed the Higgins Boat the "Papa Boat" or "Peter Boat" to differentiate it from other landing craft such as the LCU and the LCM, with the LCM being called the "Mike Boat".

== Design ==
At just over 36 ft (11 m) long and just under 11 ft (3.4 m) wide, the LCVP was not a large craft. Powered by a 225-horsepower Gray Marine 6-71 diesel engine at a maximum speed of 12 knots, it would sway in choppy seas, causing seasickness. Since its sides and rear were made of plywood, it offered limited protection from enemy fire but also reduced weight—and thus increased capacity, reduced cost and saved steel. The Higgins boat could hold either a 36-man platoon, a jeep and a 12-man squad, or 8,000 lb (3.6 t) of cargo. Its shallow draft (3 feet aft and 2 feet, 2 inches forward) enabled it to run up onto the shoreline, and a semi-tunnel built into its hull protected the propeller from sand and other debris. The steel ramp at the front could be lowered quickly. It was possible for the Higgins boat to swiftly disembark men and supplies, reverse itself off the beach, and return to the supply ship for another load within three to four minutes.

The boat's design left it vulnerable to heavier enemy fire, and it was found that extremely shallow water and hard obstructions such as reefs could stop the boat. Other vehicles such as the Landing Vehicle Tracked were later created to meet those drawbacks in amphibious operations.

The Higgins boat was built in New Orleans, Louisiana.

== History ==
Andrew Higgins was a lumber dealer and boat builder in New Orleans. In 1926, he designed a "Eureka boat" for use by trappers and oil-drillers in the shallow waters of the Louisiana bayous and Gulf coast. It had a tunnel stern to protect the propeller and a "spoonbill" bow to run up and retract on low banks. Some claim he also marketed the boats to rum-runners.

In 1930, Higgins' lumber business went bankrupt, and in 1933 Prohibition was repealed, ending rum-running. The Navy's interest in the Higgins boat was thus providential, though Higgins proved unable to manage his company's good fortune.

The United States Marine Corps was always interested in finding better ways to get men across a beach in an amphibious landing. They were frustrated that the Navy's Bureau of Construction and Repair could not meet its requirements.

Higgins proposed his Eureka boat as a landing craft to the Bureau in 1936, but was turned down. However, in late 1937, Commander Ralph McDowell of the Bureau invited Higgins to visit the Navy Department. Higgins and McDowell worked up an improved design, which Higgins delivered a month later.

When tested in 1938 by the Navy and Marine Corps, the Higgins design outperformed the boats designed by the Bureau. The boat was tested by the services at Fleet Landing Exercise 5 (Flex 5) in February 1939. The Marines found it quite satisfactory, but Bureau representative Lieutenant Commander R. B. Daggett wrote that it was "too heavy... too slow... with ... excessive gasoline consumption". Even after Flex 6 showed that the Eureka boat was the best available boat design, the Bureau still championed one of its designs.

However, with available funds greatly increased as the Navy expanded for the expected war, the Navy ordered 32 of each design. The Higgins design was designated the Landing Craft, Personnel (Large) (LCP(L)). The LCP(L) displaced 5.8 tons, carried 36 troops, and had two machine gun positions at the bow.

In September 1940, the Navy finally settled on the LCP(L).2,193 were eventually acquired.

The LCP(L) still had a major drawback: men and equipment had to disembark over its sides. This was time-consuming and exposed to enemy fire in combat.

The Japanese had been using ramp-bowed landing boats like Daihatsu-class landing craft in the Second Sino-Japanese War since the summer of 1937. These boats had come under intense scrutiny by Navy and Marine Corps observers at the Battle of Shanghai in particular, including future general Victor H. Krulak. In May 1941, Krulak and Major Ernest E. Linsert showed Higgins a picture Krulak had taken in 1937. They suggested that Higgins develop a version of the ramped craft for the Navy. Higgins, at his own expense, had his designers add a ramp to the Eureka boat, and built three of the craft. Meanwhile, Linsert had urged the Marine Corps Equipment Board, headed by Brigadier General Emile P. Moses, to procure ramp-bow Eureka boats.

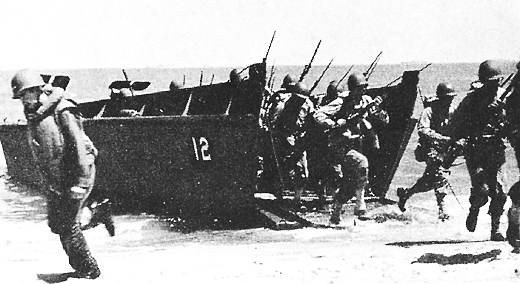
Men disembarking from an LCVP.

On May 21, 1941, Daggett and Linsert observed informal testing of the three craft. The tests included off-loading a truck and embarking and disembarking of 36 Higgins employees, simulating troops. Formal tests with General Moses presiding followed in June. The ramp-bow Eureka was approved as the Landing Craft, Personnel (Ramp) (LCP(R)). 2,631 were produced.

The LCP(R) was used in beach landings at Guadalcanal in August 1942, and in North Africa in November 1942.

In April 1943, a new design, the Landing Craft Vehicle, Personnel (LCVP). went into production, replacing the LCP(R). The LCVP displaced 9 tons, with the same capacity as the LCP(R). The two machine guns were relocated to the after deck. 23,358 LCVPs were built. They were used in every Allied amphibious operation from the invasion of Sicily in July 1943 through the end of the war. 1,089 LCVPs were used by US forces on D-Day.

LCP(R)s and LCVPs were also supplied to Britain from October 1940. LVCPs were used in raids by Commandos. LCVPs were also used extensively by British forces on D-Day.

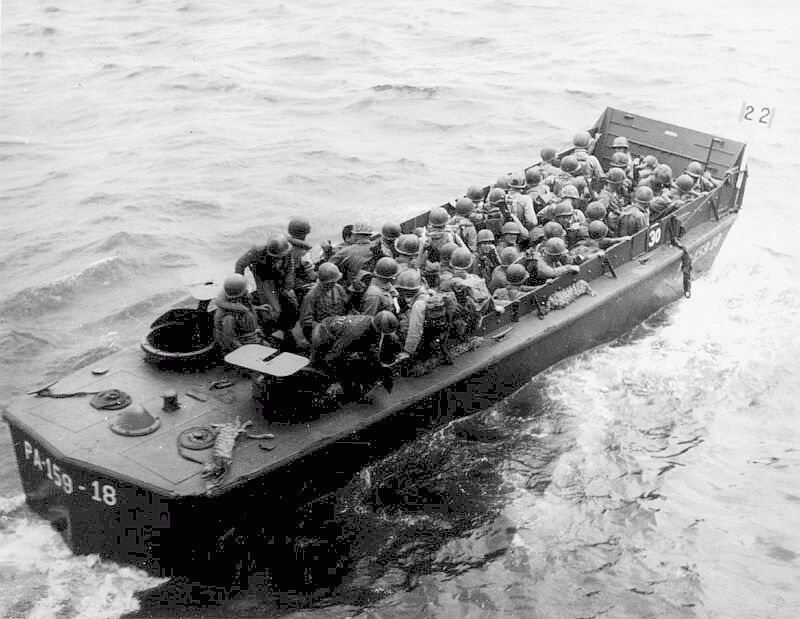
USS Darke (APA-159)'s LCVP 18, possibly with army troops as reinforcements at Okinawa, circa 9 to 14 April 1945.

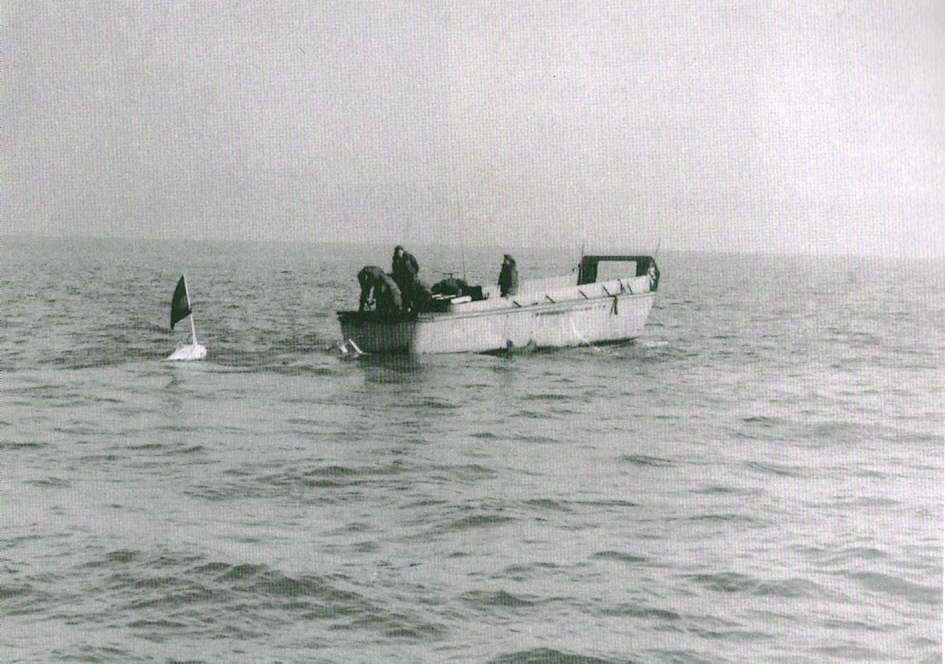
U.S. Navy sailors stream minesweeping gear behind an LCVP off Chinnampo, North Korea, on 5 December 1950 during the Korean War.

== Legacy ==
The Supreme Allied Commander, General Dwight D. Eisenhower, declared the Higgins boat to have been crucial to the Allied victory on the European Western Front and the previous fighting in North Africa and Italy:

Andrew Higgins ... is the man who won the war for us. ... If Higgins had not designed and built those LCVPs, we never could have landed over an open beach. The whole strategy of the war would have been different.

The Higgins boat was used for many amphibious landings, including the landings in Nazi German-occupied Normandy as part of Operation Overlord and during the Allied Crossing of the Rhine, and previously Operation Torch in North Africa, the Allied invasion of Sicily, Operation Shingle and Operation Avalanche in Italy, Operation Dragoon, as well as in the Pacific Theatre at the Battle of Guadalcanal, the Battle of Attu, the Battle of Tarawa, the Battle of Guam, the Battle of Peleliu, the Battle of the Philippines, the Battle of Iwo Jima and the Battle of Okinawa. Higgins boats also saw use during the Korean War during the Battle of Incheon, Operation Tailboard, and the Hungnam evacuation. The boats also participated in the landing of U.S. Marines during the 1958 Lebanon crisis.

LCVPs fitted with a roof and an Oerlikon 20 mm cannon were used by the French Navy's Dinassauts during the First Indochina War to patrol the Mekong, along with other US-origin landing craft.

== Surviving examples ==
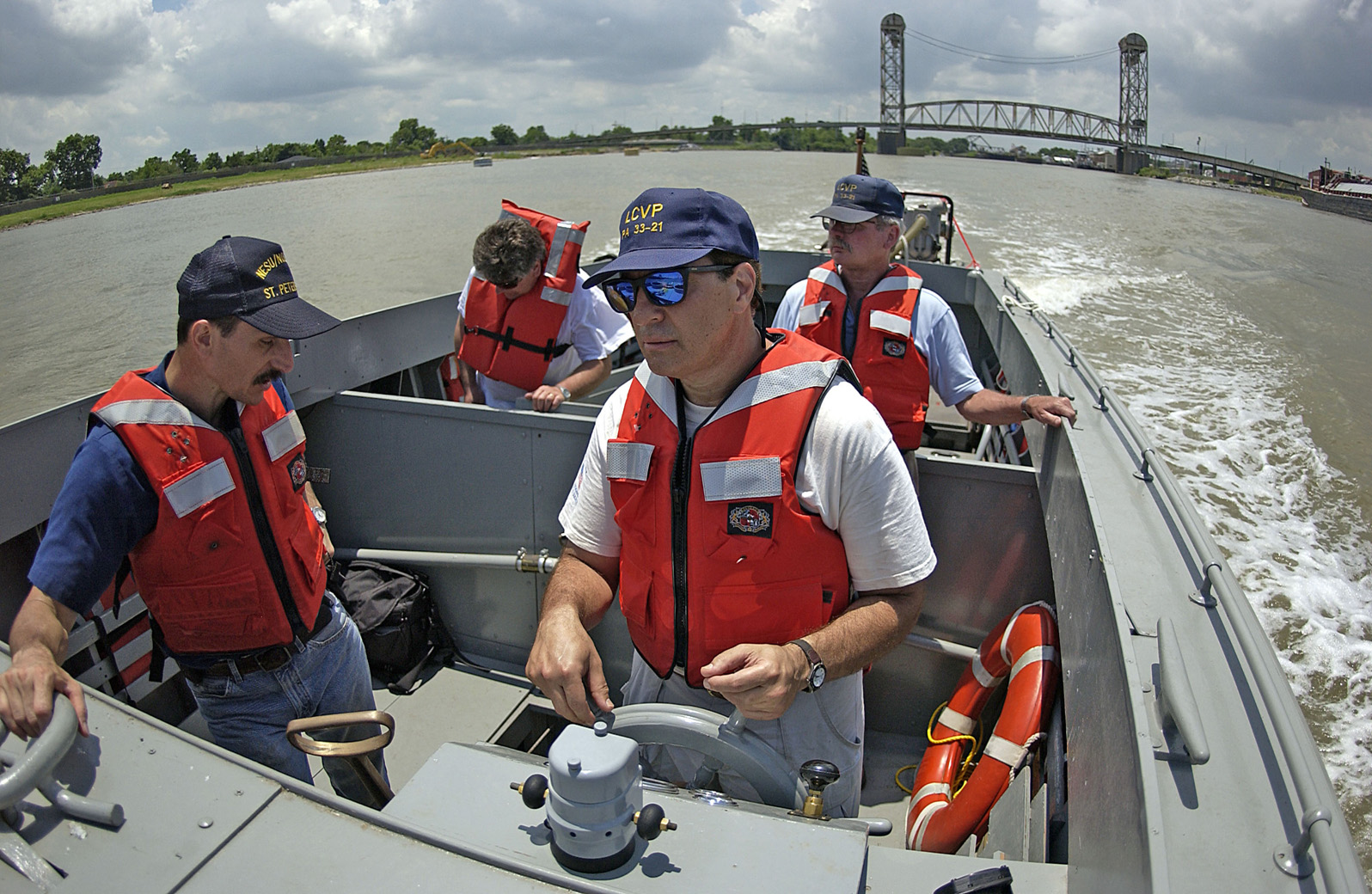
A replica Higgins boat plies the water near New Orleans

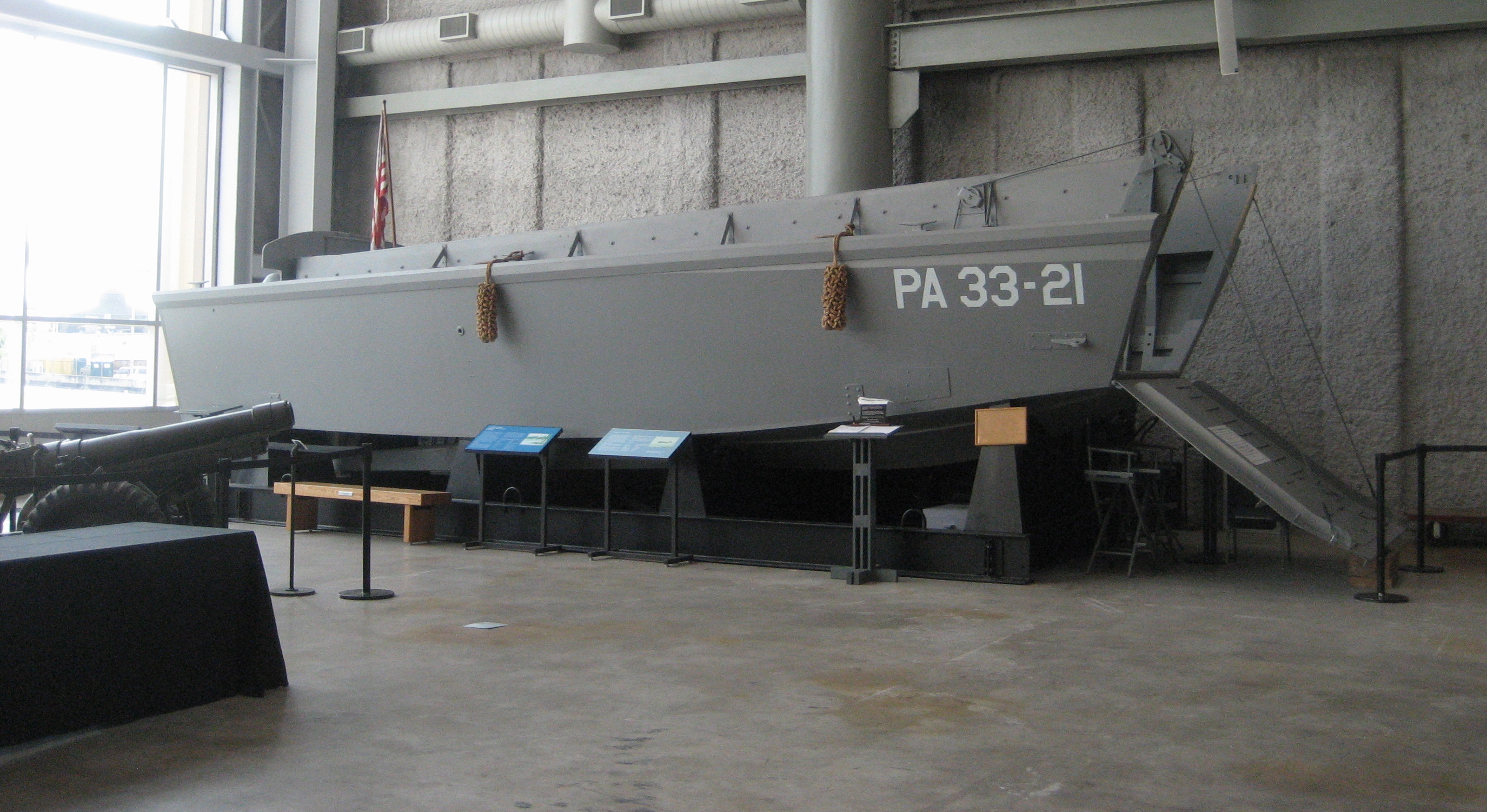
Higgins boat on display in The National WWII Museum

Only a few Higgins boats have survived, often with substantial modifications for post-war use. A remarkably preserved Higgins boat, with the original Higgins motor, was discovered in a boat yard in Valdez, Alaska, and moved to the Museum of World War II just outside Boston in 2000. It had been used as a fishing boat in very shallow areas but, except for an easily removed addition to the cockpit, had not been altered; all of the armor plate was complete, as were gauges and equipment. The only restoration was a repainting to the original color.

An original Higgins boat discovered in Normandy has been professionally restored by the North Carolina Maritime Museum for the First Division Museum at Cantigny Park in Wheaton, Illinois. This Higgins boat was located in Vierville-sur-Mer, Normandy, by Overlord Research, LLC, a West Virginia company formed in 2002 for the purpose of locating, preserving, and returning WWII artifacts to the United States. Overlord purchased the vessel from its French owners and then transported the Higgins boat to Hughes Marine Service in Chidham, England, for initial evaluation and restoration. During this evaluation, the First Division Museum acquired the Higgins boat from Overlord Research, LLC, and moved the vessel to Beaufort, North Carolina, for extensive restoration. It was then acquired by the Collings Foundation and is now on display at the American Heritage Museum in Stow, Massachusetts.

An original LCVP is on display at the National Museum of the United States Army in Fort Belvoir, Virginia. It was located by Overlord Research, LLC, on the Isle of Wight and acquired by the company. It was transported to Hughes Marine Service, where it underwent extensive restoration. Upon completion of the restoration work to standards set by the United States Army Center of Military History, this Higgins boat was purchased by the Center of Military History for future display in the museum.

An original LCVP is on display at the National Museum of the United States Navy in Washington, D.C.

An original LCVP is under restoration at the Maisy battery in Grandcamp-Maisy, Normandy. It was found in a farmyard in Isigny sur Mer in 2008.

An original LCVP is on display at The D-Day Story in Portsmouth, Hampshire. It was restored by Hughes Marine Service.

An original LCVP is seaworthy with Challenge LCVP in Rouen, Normandy. It was constructed in 1942 and may have taken part in landings in North Africa and in Italy during World War II.

An original LCVP is in storage with the WWII Veterans History Project in Clermont, Florida. It was acquired by the organization in April 2020 and is currently awaiting restoration.

An original LCVP is undergoing restoration at the Indiana Military Museum in Vincennes, Indiana. The stern of the boat displays AG 39 and was presumably attached to the USS Menemsha (AG-39), a weather patrol ship in the North Atlantic, during WWII. It was later used, commercially, in Vallejo, California, before being re-located previously to Port St. Lucie, Florida.

An original LCVP is on display at the Motts Military Museum in Groveport, Ohio. It is from the USS Cambria (APA-36), which survived seven Pacific Theatre invasions.

An original LCVP is on display at the Roberts Armory Museum in Rochelle, Illinois.

One is undergoing restoration at the Louisiana Military Hall of Fame and Museum in Abbeville, Louisiana.

A replica Higgins boat, built in the 1990s using the original specifications from Higgins Industries, is on display in The National WWII Museum in New Orleans.

In July 2018, a 1942 LCVP designed in a similar fashion to the Eureka model was discovered in the Sacramento–San Joaquin River Delta of California. Having been left unattended in brackish waters for at least 40 years, restoration was not required and post survey, the hull was confirmed as perfectly sound. It is currently being operated under its own power by owner with the original Chrysler Crown Marine engine and unmodified transmission. Features include the original gauges, Bureau of Ships ID 72530, steel bunks, fire extinguisher, boat horn and several other original features all of which are in working order.

An intact surviving example is known to lie beached at King Edward Point on South Georgia although this craft is in poor condition due to the Antarctic environment.

An LCVP in relatively good condition was discovered in Shasta Lake in Northern California, during a drought in 2021. The boat had been carried by the USS Monrovia during World War II, and had been in combat in Sicily and later in the Battle of Tarawa, where it had sunk and had later been salvaged. It is not known how the boat ended up at Shasta Lake. When stabilized, the boat will be exhibited at the Nebraska National Guard Museum.

A capsized surviving example was revealed during a severe drought in July 2022 at Lake Mead. According to The Lake Mead National Recreation Area National Park Service (NPS) the Higgins Craft is still wrapped in armor plating.

=== Postwar ===
A post-war version is in use at the Regional Military Museum in Houma, Louisiana.

A post-war example utilising fibreglass construction instead of plywood is in the Shopland Collection, located near Bristol, England. It has been used in the filming of Saving Private Ryan and several documentaries about Operation Overlord. This vessel is currently stored awaiting restoration.

== In popular culture ==
The 1956 movie Away All Boats shows the role of Higgins boats in beach landings. The novel of the same name was written by a former naval officer who served on an attack transport and gives detailed information on their use.

The use of these boats during the D-day invasions at Normandy is shown in the feature films The Longest Day and Saving Private Ryan. The boats were also used in a scene during the 1985 film Invasion USA, in which communist guerrillas land on a Florida beach.

== See also ==
- Gray Marine Motor Company
- Landing Craft Assault
- Landing Craft Mechanized (LCM)
- Landing Craft Personnel (Large)
- Landing Craft Vehicle Personnel
- Landing Ship, Tank (LST)
- Landing Vehicle Tracked ("Amtrac")
