= Gray Marine Motor Company =

Defunct engineering company

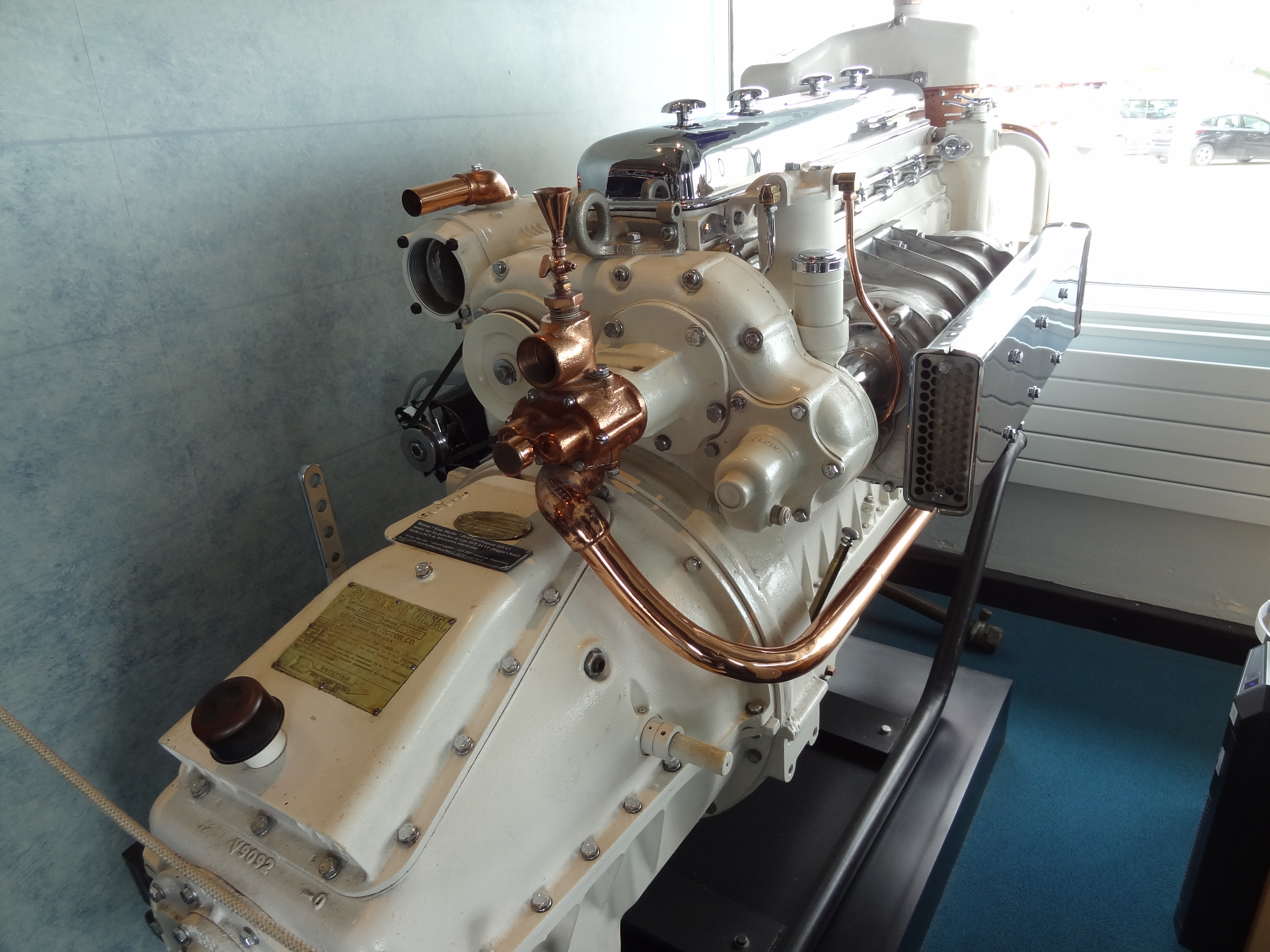
Gray Marine engine preserved at Arromanches-les-Bains, Normandy

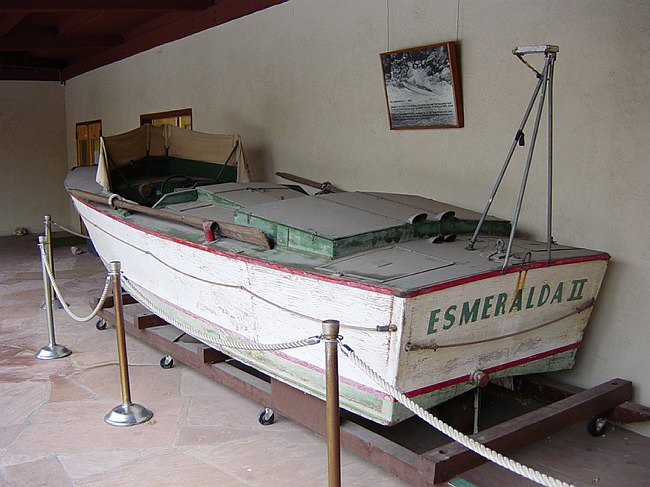
Esmeralda II, 1947, first power boat through the Grand Canyon

Gray Marine Motor Company was a U.S. manufacturer of marine engines between 1910 and 1967. These ranged from one to six cylinders in both gas and later diesel layouts, which were used in pleasure boats, work boats, and military craft.

Gray was based in Detroit. Many fishing boats, lobsterboats, tugs and pleasure craft used Gray engines. These boats usually fell between 12 and 32 feet. Many of their engines were marinized automotive engines from Hercules, Studebaker, Pontiac, Continental, American Motors or General Motors Diesel Division.

Gray also produced a line of outboard motors. Rather than a ninety-degree gearbox, a curved housing connected motor to propeller. The lower-unit housing contained a flexible inner rotating shaft.

== Origins ==
Gray Marine started in 1892 and was re-branded Gray Motor Company about 1910 by O. Mulford and his partners Paul and David Gray. The engines were also used by Traffic Motor Truck Corporation of St Louis, Koehler Truck of New Jersey, Panhard truck, and the Crow-Elkhart car. Prairie Queen tractors also used this engine in 1922.

== Automobiles ==
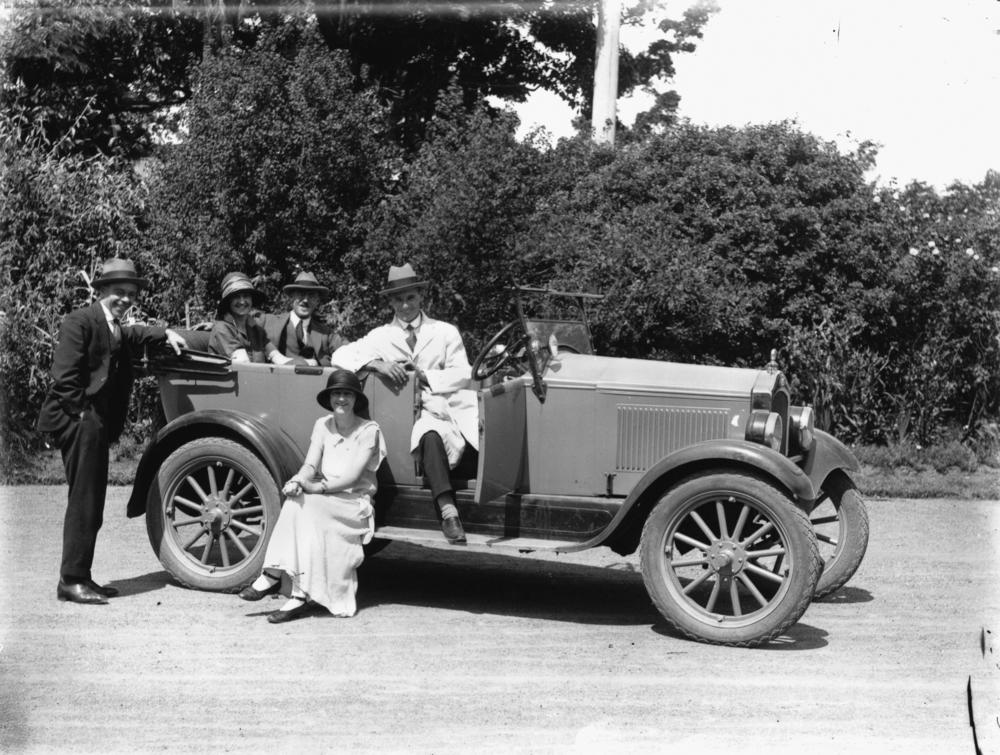
1925 Gray tourer with passengers, Brisbane.

In 1921 Frank L. Klingensmith, William Blackburn (from Cadillac) and Frank F. Beall (from Packard) took over the Gray Motor Company, renaming it Gray Motor Corporation with $4 million capital, with the intent of competing with Ford. Two models of Gray car were made using the Beall developed Z motor. The Z engine was a 12-18 horsepower, 4 cylinder, L-head design that was said to resemble the model T Ford engine.

By 1924 the company was in poor financial condition and Mulford managed to buy back the marine engine division, re-establishing Gray Marine Motor Company. Gray Motor Corporation ceased producing cars by 1926.

== Marine engines ==
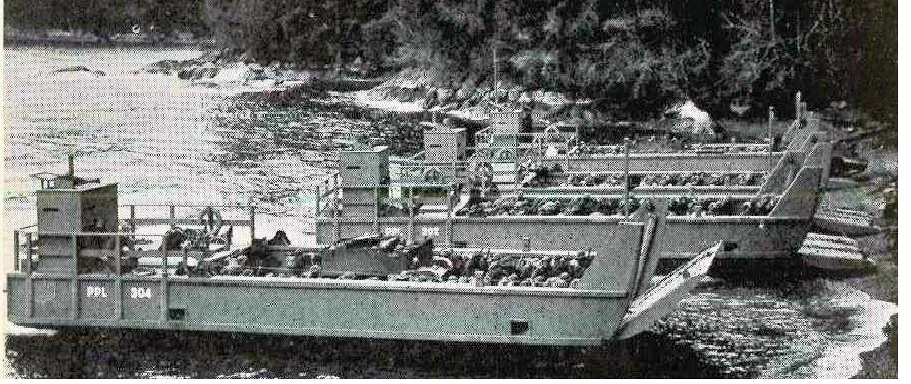
Canadian ramped cargo lighter, a World War II landing craft

The marine engine division continued operations for over forty years, and is most known for converting automotive engines for fishboats, cruisers and World War II landing craft, such as the Canadian Ramped cargo lighter and the famed Higgins boats. Gray built their own engines up to 1924, but converted automotive engines from about April 1924 on. During WWII, Gray Marine built 100 marinized GM style 71 series diesels a day using GM cylinder blocks.

On June 14, 1944, the company was purchased by Continental Motors Company for $2.6 million. John W. Mulford, the son of O. Mulford, was made general manager of Gray. Gray continued to make marine engines in the post-war period until its closure by Continental in about 1967.
