= Assault Support Patrol Boat =

Patrol boat in the US Navy

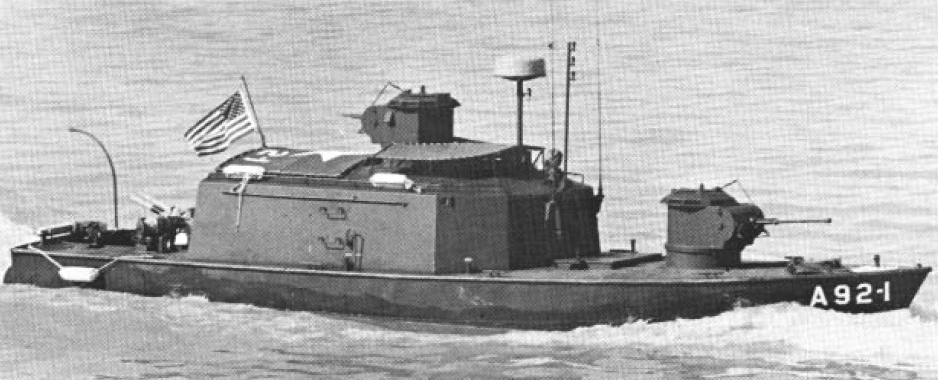
- ASPB in South Vietnam c.1968

Class overview
- Name: ASPB (Assault Support Patrol Boat)
- Operators: See Operators
- Completed: 86

General characteristics
- Type: Riverine patrol boat
- Length: 50 ft (15 m)
- Propulsion: 2 × 430hp General Motors 12V71 diesel engines
- Speed: 14.8 knots
- Range: 130 nautical miles (240 km; 150 mi)
- Complement: 5
- Armament: two Mk 48 turrets with either 20 mm cannon or .50 cal machine guns; two single M60 machine guns or Mk 21 machine guns; one Mk 2 Mod 0/1 .50 cal machine gun/81mm mortar

The Assault Support Patrol Boat (ASPB) (also known as the Alpha Boat), was a heavily armed and armored riverine patrol boat developed by the United States Navy for use in the Vietnam War from late 1967.

== History ==
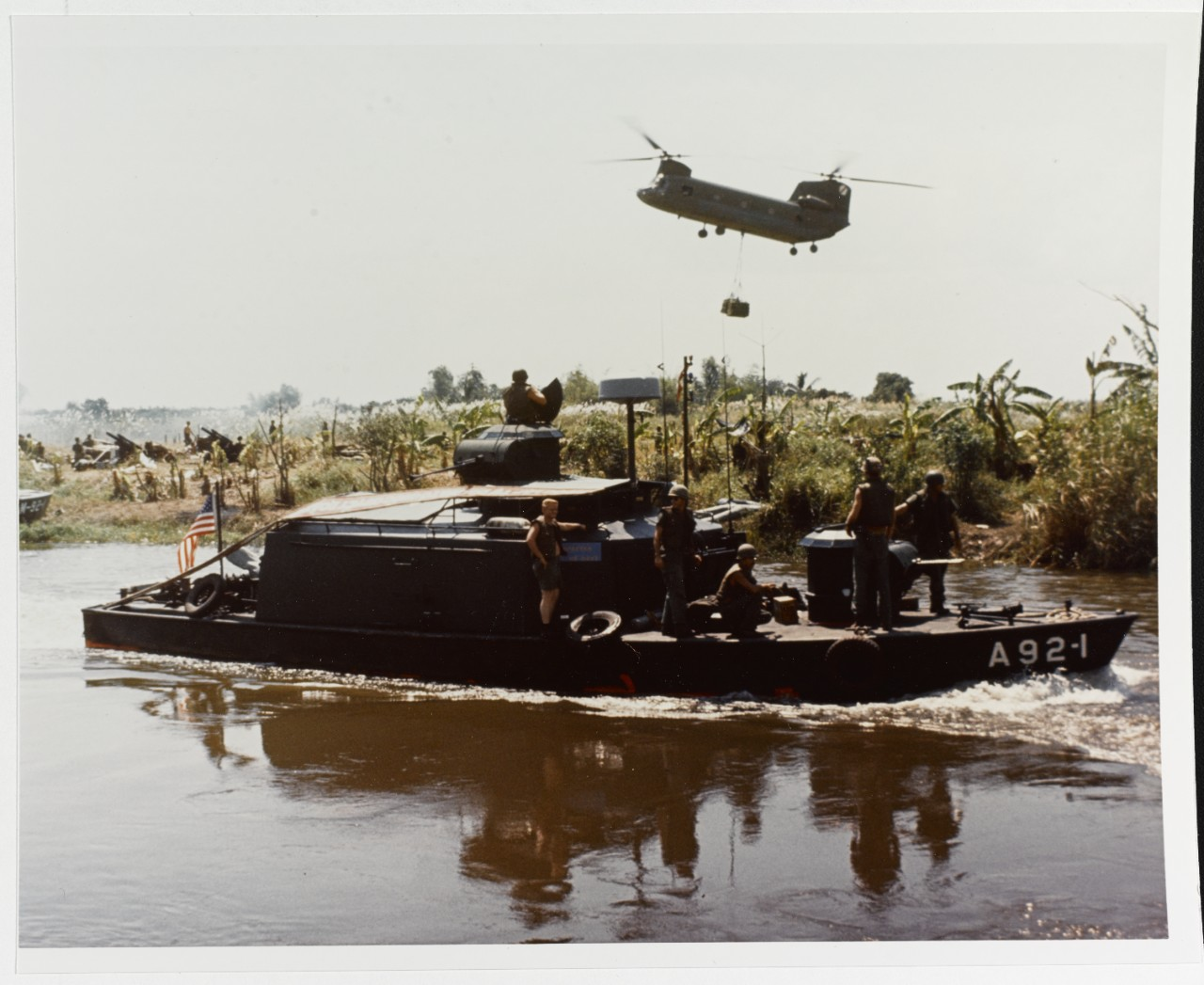
ASPB on patrol during Operation Coronado IX, November 1967

The ASPB was approximately 50 feet (15 m) long, its hull was constructed of 7/32 inch (5.6 mm) steel, from the gunwale 2 inches (51 mm) up it was 1/8 inch (3.2 mm) steel, its superstructure was 1/4 inch (6.4 mm) aluminum which provided protection against 57mm recoilless rifle rounds and armor-piercing bullets up to .50 caliber in size. The first 36 boats were ordered from Gunderson Brothers Engineering Corporation of Portland, Oregon on 25 October 1966. The initial boats were armed with two Mk 48 turrets with either 20 mm cannon or .50 cal machine guns, two single M60 machine guns or Mk 21 machine guns and one Mk 2 Mod 0/1 .50 cal machine gun/81mm mortar in a well in the aft of the boat, but this well was eliminated in later models. The boat had a complement of five crewmen and could carry up to eight soldiers. The boat was powered by two 430 hp General Motors 12V71 diesel engines giving a top speed of 14.8 knots and it expelled its exhaust directly into the water reducing noise and smoke emissions, making it the quietest river patrol craft. The boat carried some 650 gallons of diesel fuel, allowing an operational range of 130 nautical miles (240 km; 150 mi) at 10 knots.

The first ASPBs arrived at Vung Tau, South Vietnam on 20 September 1967 and were offloaded on 22 September. The ASPBs were to act as escorts and provide protection for the slower Armored Troop Carriers (ATCs) of the Mobile Riverine Force during the troop transport phase of riverine assaults. Due to their steel construction and armor, the boats would also perform minesweeping in advance of river assault squadrons and serve as a blocking and interception force in the waterways around the area of operation. The ASPBs first saw action on 28 September 1967 during Operation Coronado V when they were used as minesweepers for an assault on An Dinh village, the "birthplace" of the Viet Cong.

On 21 December 1967, ASPB 111-4 hit a 75-pound mine 2 miles (3.2 km) northwest of Đồng Tâm Base Camp. Although the mine detonated right against the ASPB, the charge failed to puncture the hull, and the ASPB was able to return to base on its own power with only moderate damage.

These boats were followed by another fifty craft ordered on 24 January 1968, however within months of their deployment, the boats began revealing some shortcomings. Between February and March 1968 four ASPBs sank due to noncombat reasons. In one event, on 2 March two passing ASPBs swamped ASPB 91–1, causing the boat to sink in less than a minute and drowning a sailor who became trapped in a berthing compartment. A Navy investigation of all four sinkings concluded that the primary faults were the lack of seaworthiness caused by inadequate compartmentalization and marginal buoyancy, coupled with excessive weight and a low freeboard. As a quick fix, Naval Forces Vietnam tried to improve the ASPB's seaworthiness by removing engine-compartment armor to reduce top weight. The armor also never lived up to its promise. Engineers had difficulty developing a hard, lightweight armor that was not brittle. On the first generation boats, a 75mm recoilless rifle round aimed at the cockpit could break off an entire piece of armor and propel it through the cockpit. By late 1969 most ASPBs were being used only for minesweeping and base security duties.

=== Mark II prototypes ===
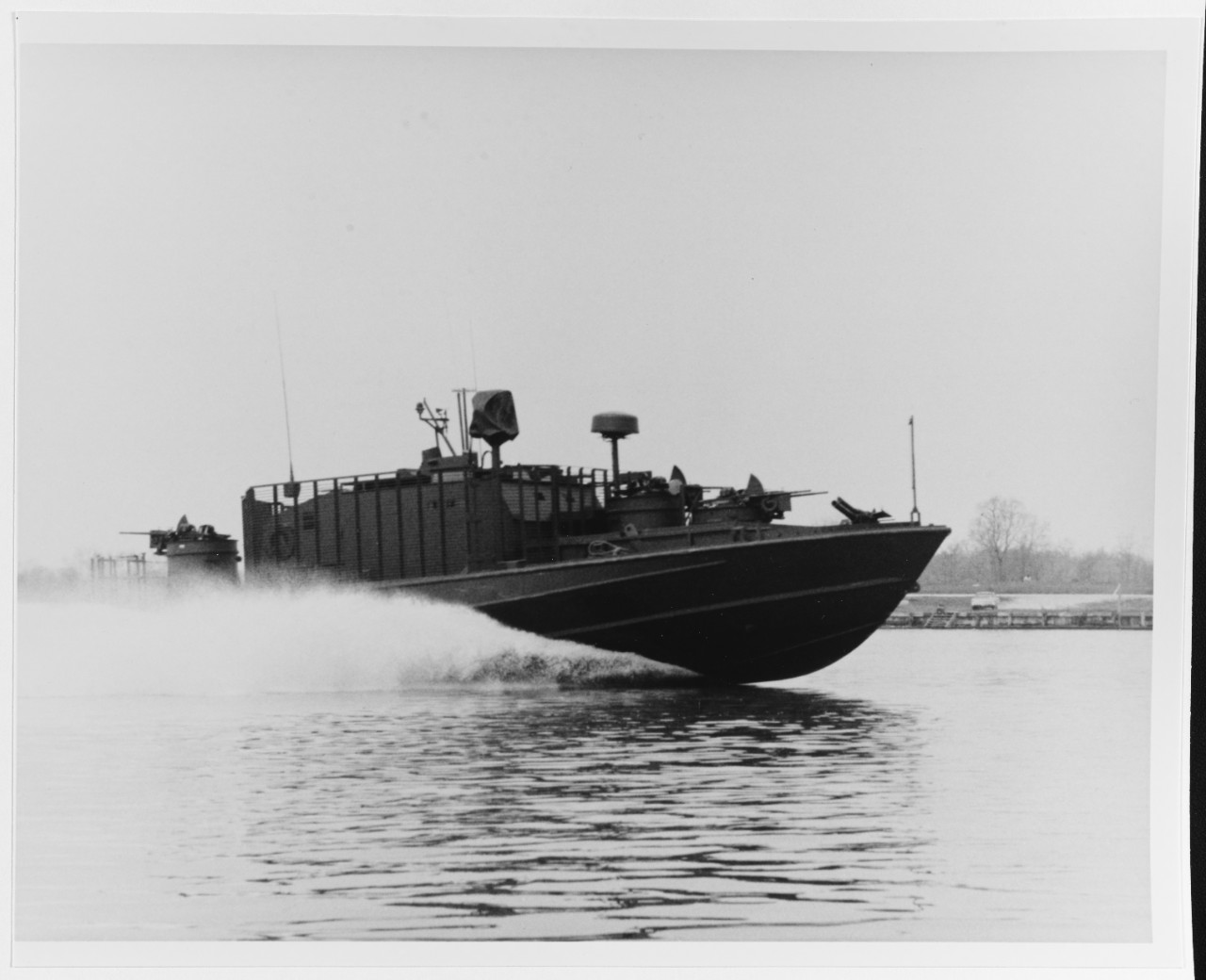
Stewart Seacraft ASPB Mark II prototype trials, 1969

Stewart Seacraft built an ASPB Mark II prototype at Berwick, Louisiana. The Stewart Mark II had three gun turrets and a mortar well in the extreme bow and bar armor around midships superstructure.

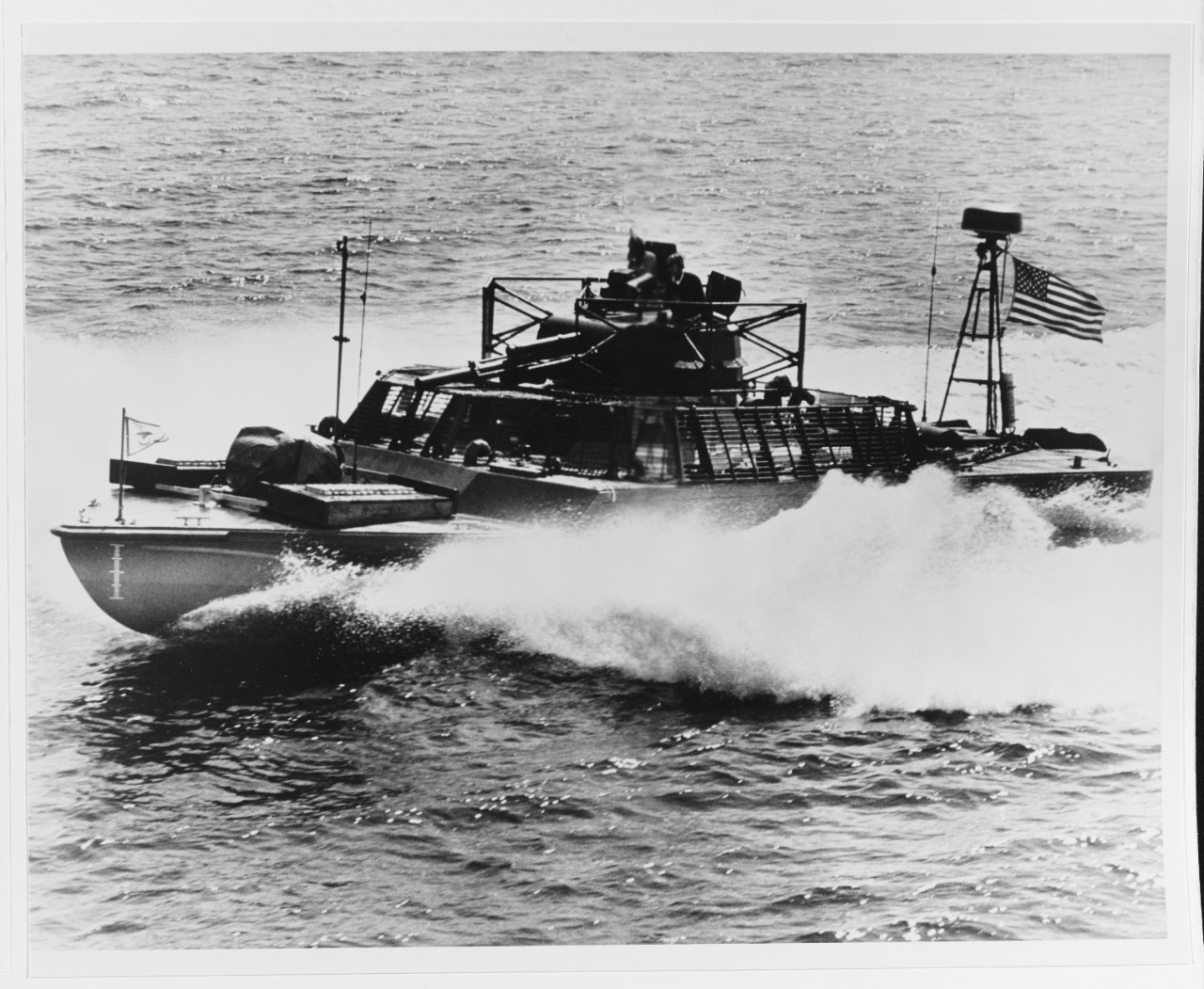
Sikorsky Aircraft ASPB Mark II prototype, c. 1969

Sikorsky Aircraft also built a Mark II prototype mounting a 105mm gun and two 20mm cannons in a central turret. The prototype was delivered to the Navy at the end of 1969. It was powered by three Pratt & Whitney PT-6 engines connected to three water-jet pumps giving a maximum speed of 50 miles per hour (80 km/h). The prototype was never adopted into service but remained in use with special forces until 1980.

== Operators ==
- United States – U.S. Navy
- South Vietnam – Republic of Vietnam Navy
- Khmer Republic – Khmer National Navy

== Bibliography ==
- Gordon L. Rottman and Hugh Johnson, Vietnam Riverine Craft 1962-75, New Vanguard series 128, Osprey Publishing Ltd, Oxford 2006. ISBN 9781841769318
