= Gray Marine 6-71 Diesel Engine =

Marinized engine

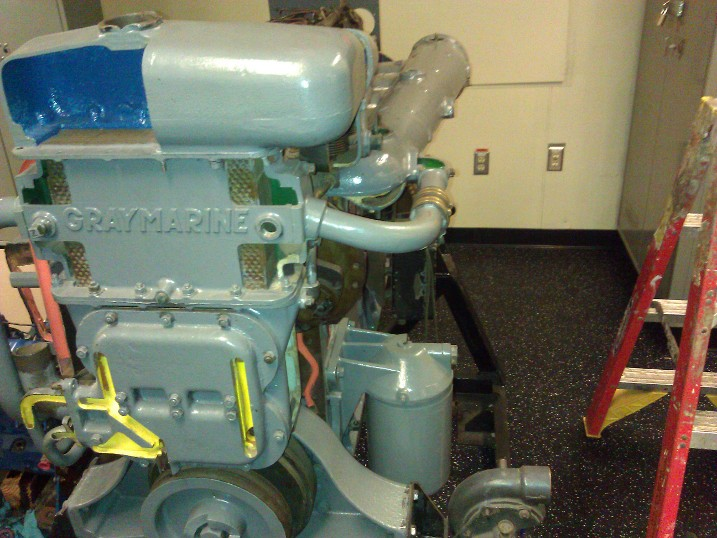
A 6-71 Gray Marine training engine aboard the Training Ship Golden Bear

The 6-71 Gray Marine Diesel Engine is a marinized version of the General Motors Detroit Diesel 6-71 engine developed in 1938 produced by the Gray Marine Motor Company. It was used in landing craft during World War II and is used today in private boats and training facilities.

== Engine characteristics ==
The 6-71 is an inline-six cylinder diesel engine. The 71 refers to the displacement in cubic inches of each cylinder. The firing order of the engine is 1-5-3-6-2-4. The engine's compression ratio is 18.7:1 with a 4.250 inch bore and a 5.00 inch stroke. The engine weighs 2,185 lb (991 kg) and is 54 inches long, 29 inches wide and 41 inches tall. At 2,100 revolutions per minute the engine is capable of producing 230 horse power (172 kilowatts). V-type versions of the 71 series were developed in 1957.

The 6-71 is a two-stroke engine. A mechanically-driven blower charges the cylinders with air and assists in clearing ("scavenging") exhaust gases following the power stroke. On the 6-71T models, a turbocharger is utilized to assist the blower in charging the cylinders with air, with the turbocharger discharging into the blower intake. Unlike the turbocharger of a four-stroke engine, the primary purpose of the 6-71T's turbo is to reduce the blower's parasitic loading at higher engine power levels, which improves fuel economy.

Fuel is provided by unit injectors, one per cylinder, each injector being cycled by the camshaft that also cycles the exhaust valves. The amount of fuel injected into the engine is controlled by the engine's governor. The engine cooling is via liquid in a water jacket. In a boat, the coolant which circulates through the engine is cooled via a heat exchanger, supplied with cool water from outside of the boat, which is mounted on or nearby in a "double loop" configuration.

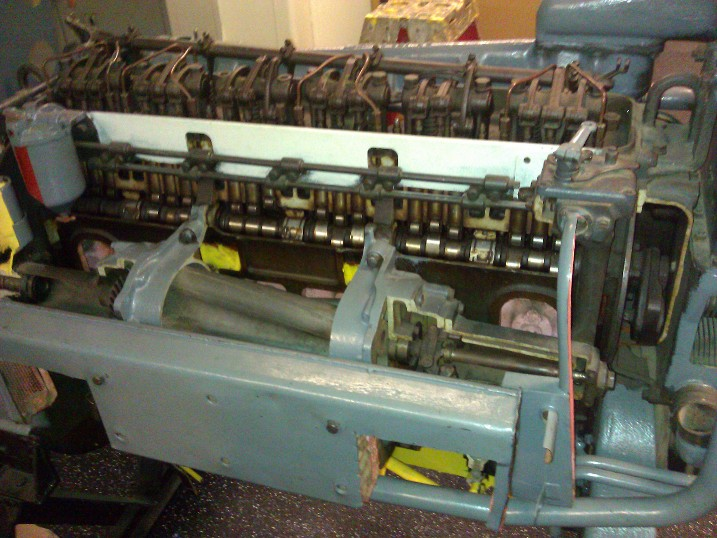
Side cutaway view of the Gray Marine 6-71

== Development ==
The Gray Marine 6-71 Marine Diesel was developed from the General Motors 6-71 diesel engine that was in use for on-road applications, farm machinery, and other off-road applications. Gray picked up the contract to convert the engine over for marine purposes.

== Use ==
The 6-71 was used for Higgins LCVP, a landing craft used in larger numbers during World War II. During the war years, about 100,000 (including the Gray-Marine variant) GMC 6-71 were built, serviced, and operated.
