= Serbian River Flotilla =

Brown water naval branch of the Serbian Armed Forces

River Flotilla
- Речна флотила
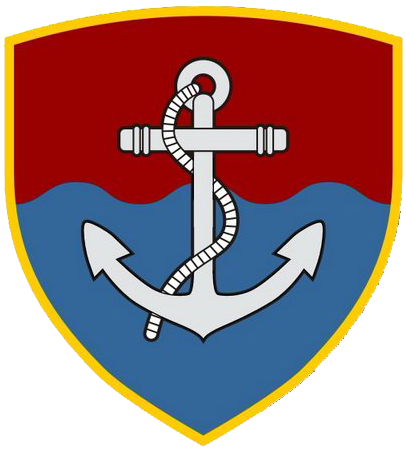
- Emblem of the Serbian River Flotilla
- Founded: 1915 (current form since 2006)
- Country: Serbia
- Branch: Serbian Army
- Type: Brown-water navy
- Role: Control of inland waterways
- Size: ~500 personnel 29 ships and boats
- Part of: Serbian Armed Forces
- Headquarters: Novi Sad
- Mottos: For Freedom and Honour of the Fatherland (Serbian: За слободу и част Отаџбине, romanized: Za slobodu i čast Otadžbine)
- Anniversaries: 19 August
- Engagements: First Balkan War; Second Balkan War; World War I World War II; Yugoslav Wars

Commanders
- River Flotilla Commander: Captain Darko Stričić

Insignia
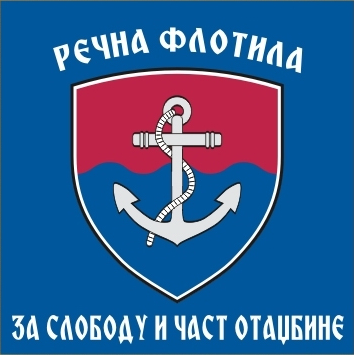
- Flag

- Ensign

The Serbian River Flotilla (Serbian: Речна флотила, romanized: Rečna flotila) is a tactical brigade-level brown water naval branch subordinated to the Serbian Army of the Serbian Armed Forces. Patrolling on the Danube, Sava, and Tisa rivers, it is tasked with environmental policing, counter-terrorism, and border security along country's international river borders.

== History ==
The modern Serbian River Flotilla traces its origins back to the Serbian Šajkaši river troops that guarded the Danube and Sava rivers, and especially, the Port of Belgrade, against Ottoman Empire river fleets from the 16th to the 19th century. Led by Hungarian or Austrian sponsors against the Ottomans, šajkaš troops were ethnic Serbs, who enjoyed special military status. Their name Šajkaš was derived from the small wooden boat known as chaika (Šajka), a type of galley operated by sail or oars manned by 30 and 50 men, commanded by an officer, a helmsman, an armourer, a drummer, two bowman, and up to 36 oarsmen. The modern day traditional Serbian šajkača hat is believed to be derived from the 18th-century Banat based Frontier Šajkaši Battalion uniform.

The Šajkaši played a decisive role in helping Serbia become an independent constitutional monarchy and lay the ground for the creation of modern Serbia. After the declaration of the war against Ottoman Empire in 1876, the Principality of Serbia River Flotilla deployed naval mines on the Danube, thought to be the first use of naval mines in Europe.

The Kingdom of Serbia received its first true warship, the patrol boat "Jadar", on August 19 (O.S. August 6), 1915 and that date is commemorated as the establishment of the modern Serbian River Flotilla. During the World War I flotilla protected lines of communication between Belgrade and Obrenovac, assisted in the transport of Serbian troops in Syrmia, mined waterways and performed reconnaissance.

As an allied victor in 1918, Serbia began the reconstruction and reconstitution of its armed forces, in a new state of the Kingdom of Yugoslavia. Within the Naval Department, the Danube Flotilla was headquartered in Novi Sad and commanded over the naval detachments on rivers and lakes. The fleet included the monitors' group, a number of auxiliary vessels, a proper naval base and a detachment of ships on Lake Ohrid in Macedonia.

During Yugoslav states it was organized in detachments of armored river boats, river assault ships, river auxiliary ships and minesweepers within the Yugoslav Navy.

The Yugoslav River Flotilla took an active part in War in Croatia in 1991, conducting patrol and combat missions on Danube, particularly during the Battle of Vukovar.

Following the breakup of Yugoslavia, the Yugoslav People's Army became the Armed Forces of Serbia and Montenegro in 1992 and during that transition the River Flotilla remained part of Navy. During the 1990s, one new Neštin class river minesweeper was introduced in 1999, and two 601 class landing craft were transferred from sea service at Montenegro to the River Flotilla after being overhauled at "Brodotehnika Shipyard" in Belgrade. The Flotilla in its current form was formed on October 2, 2008, when pontoon units were added to the Flotilla's structure. In 2017, the flagship command ship "Kozara" sailed from Novi Sad to Hungary in the first international voyage of a Serbian military ship since 1915.

== Missions ==
Tactical doctrine and operating procedures of the Serbian River Flotilla remain the same as those of the former Danube Flotilla of the Royal Yugoslav Navy.

The primary missions include:

- building and maintaining operational capabilities for carrying out tasks of all three missions of the Serbian Armed Forces,
- operationalization and training of command and subordinate units for carrying out dedicated tasks,
- control of inland waterways and provision of maneuvers to the units of the Serbian Army on and to rivers, channels and lakes
- search and rescue on rivers, canals and lakes.

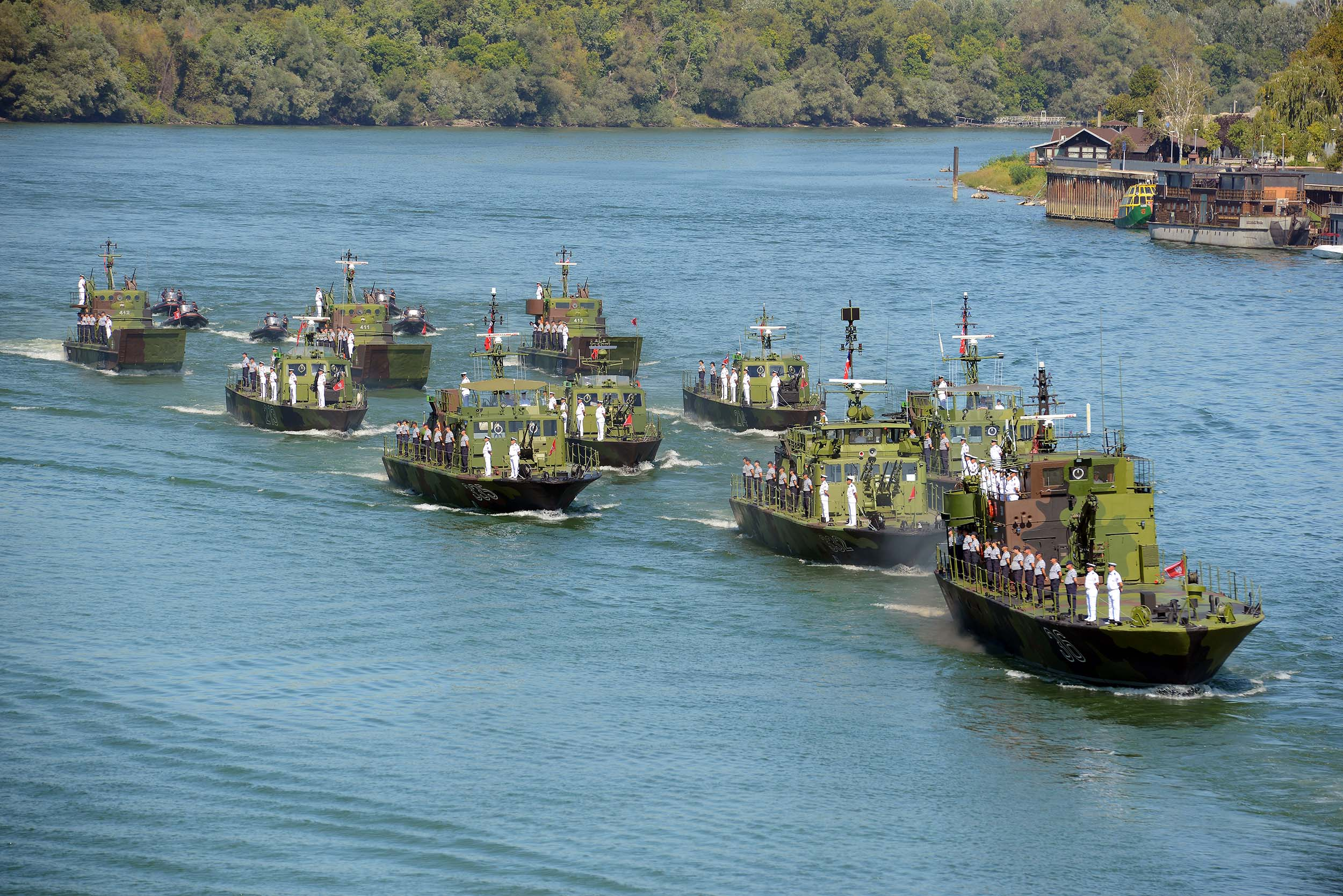
Fleet review of the River Flotilla

Largest and most complex to date search and rescue operation was during the 2014 floods in Serbia, when members of the 1st Pontoon Battalion helped fight flood in Šabac and Loznica while amphibious vehicles and divers from 93rd Diving Company evacuated 2,072 people from Obrenovac. Members of the River Flotilla were deployed throughout the country (Koceljeva, Šabac, Lazarevac, Lajkovac, Lučani and Loznica) to combat flooding: mainly in the evacuation of citizens and the reinforcement of bulwarks.

Since 2011, personnel from the River Flotilla have been deployed to Operation Atalanta, an ongoing European Union multinational counter-piracy operation off the Horn of Africa and in the Western Indian Ocean. Deploying as the Serbian Autonomous Vessel Protection Detachment (AVPD), where River Flotilla personnel are directly stationed on World Food Programme (WFP) ships in need of protection.

== Structure ==
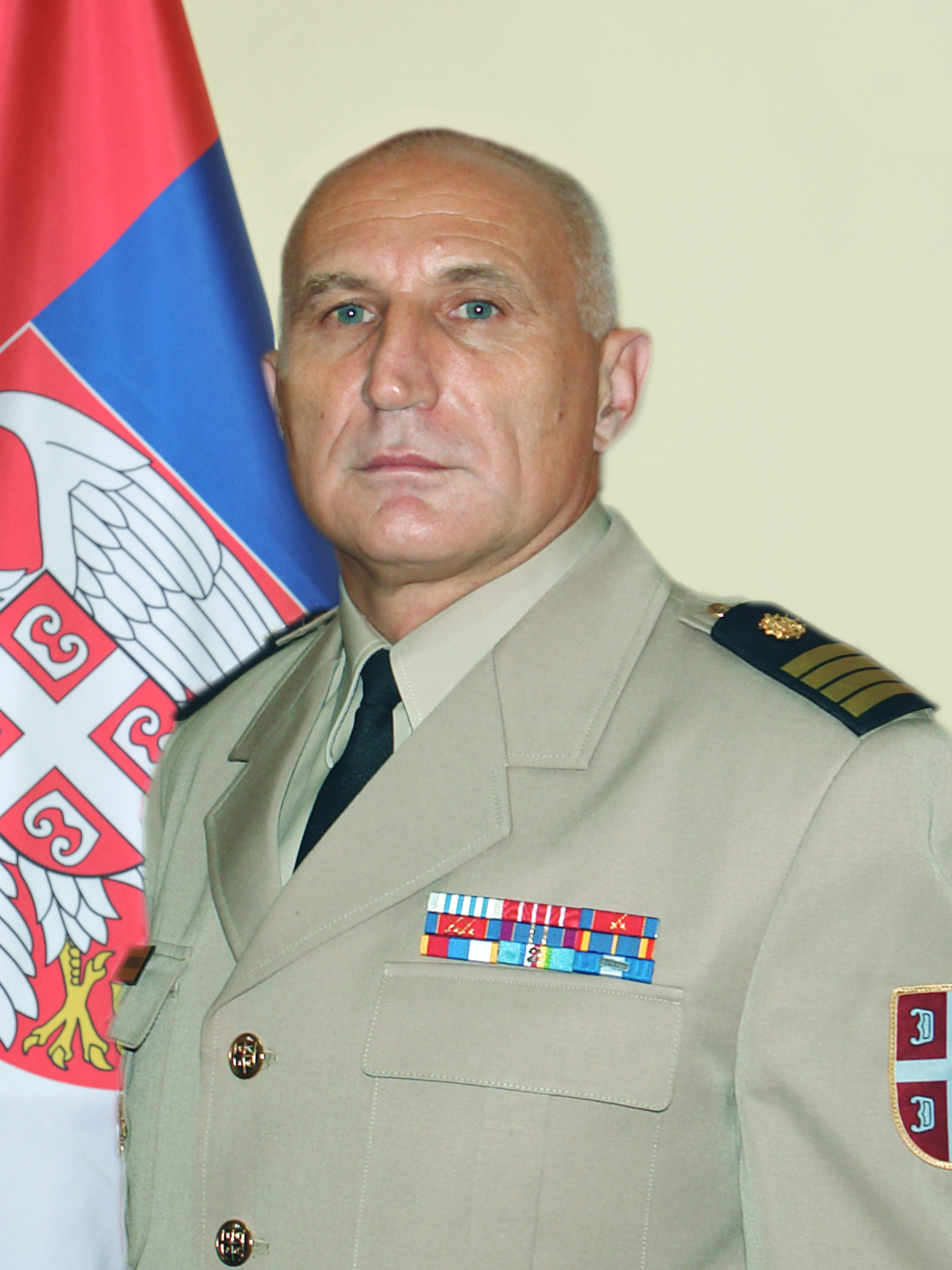
Commander of the River Flotilla Captain Ljubiša Marković

The River Flotilla is subordinated to the Serbian Army as the landlocked Serbian military doesn't possess naval branch. It is headquartered in Novi Sad, with additional units based in Belgrade and Šabac.

- Command Company (Novi Sad)
- 1st River Detachment (Novi Sad)
  - 93rd Diving Company
- 2nd River Detachment (Belgrade)
- 1st Pontoon Battalion (Šabac)
- 2nd Pontoon Battalion (Novi Sad)
- Logistics Company (Novi Sad)

== Equipment ==
The River Flotilla's surface fleet mostly date from the 1970s, but since being well maintained and subjected to periodic modest upgrades are considered to be adequate for at least another decade. Five Neštin class river minesweepers constitute the core of the fleet and although minesweepers their primary role is that of universal vessels for the control of river ways. They are expected to be in service until the end of 2020s as are Type 22 landing crafts and Type 20 patrol boats. To supplement these vessels, the flotilla has procured a number of small civilian craft, including one Premax 39 multirole fast combat boat built domestically by Yugoimport SDPR.

In October 2013, a four-year general overhaul and modification of the flotilla's flagship ship, BPN-30 "Kozara”, was completed at "Apatin Shipyard" with the addition of new diesel-electric propulsion, giving the River Flotilla functional capabilities of a hospital ship as well as navigation and shipping training ship for cadets attending the Serbian Military Academy. In 2017, China donated 24 RIB-720 boats equipped with 150 hp Yamaha outboard motors to the Serbian Armed Forces, of which 10 boats were allocated to the River Flotilla.

=== Surface Fleet ===
Current Surface Fleet
Ships	Origin	Class	Type	Ships in service	Notes
BPN-30 "Kozara"	German Austria	BPN-30 "Kozara"	Command ship Special purpose ship	BPN-30 "Kozara"	BPN-30 "Kozara" command ship (БПН - Брод посебне намене; BPN - Brod posebne namene) Command ship capable of transporting 250 troops and armed with 20 mm Oerlikon anti-aircraft gun. Built for the German Navy in "Linz Shipyard" (Austria) in 1939, the "Kozara" has seen its service on the Danube River. In the period from 1945 to 1948 the ship was used to house American soldiers at the German city of Regensburg before being sold in 1948 and used as a hotel-restaurant until 1953. The ship was subsequently procured for the Yugoslav Navy's River Flotilla in 1960 and since 1971 has been the command ship of the River Flotilla. In 2013 "Kozara" was overhauled and modernized.
RML-335 Neštin class minesweeper "Apatin"	YugoslaviaSerbia and Montenegro	Neštin class	River minesweeper	RML-332 "Titel" RML-335 "Apatin" RML-336 "Smederevo" RML-341 "Novi Sad"	Neštin class river minesweeper (РМЛ - Речни миноловац; RML - Rečni minolovac) The minesweepers of this class are capable of transporting 100 troops, 24 mines, and are armed with 4x MTU-4 S Strela 2M surface-to-air missiles and 20 mm Oerlikon anti-aircraft gun. Although the minesweepers their primary role is that of universal vessels for the control of river ways. Built at "Brodotehnika Shipyard" in Belgrade and entered service from 1975 to 1979 in the Yugoslav Navy's River Flotilla. An additional modified ship of the class "Novi Sad" was commissioned in 1999.
RPČ-214 "Morava"	Yugoslavia	Type 20 Biscaya class	River patrol craft	RPČ-213 "Kolubara" RPČ-214 "Morava" RPČ-216 "Timok"	Type 20 Biscaya class river patrol craft (РПБ - Речни патролни брод; RPB - Rečni patrolni brod) The ships of this class have a steel hull with a fibreglass superstructure and are capable of carrying 30 troops, armed with twin M71 20 mm anti-aircraft guns. The ships were built in 1980: RPČ-213 at "Josip Broz Tito Shipyard" in Belgrade and RPČ-214 and RPČ-216 at "Brodotehnika Shipyard" in Belgrade.
RPČ-111 "Jadar"	United States	No class	River patrol craft	RPČ-111 "Jadar"	River patrol craft 111 "Jadar" (РПЧ - речни патролни чамац; RPČ - rečni patrolni čamac) River patrol boat of the Serbian River Flotilla, armed with twin M71 20 mm anti-aircraft guns. The ships were built in Regensburg in 1953 for the United States Rhine River Patrol later transferred to the Yugoslav Navy's river flotilla. Today it serves mostly in a ceremonial role as the flagship of the flotilla.
DB-411 "Bečej"	Yugoslavia	Type 22 441 class	Landing craft	DB-411 "Bečej" DB-412 "Belegiš" DB-413 "Taraš" DB-414 "Begeč" DB-415 "Šajkaš"	Type 22 441 class landing craft (ДБ - Десантни брод; DB - Desantni brod) The ships of this class are capable of transporting 80 troops or 6 tonnes of cargo and are armed with twin Oerlikon 20 mm anti-aircraft guns as well as 30 mm grenade launcher. Built at "Greben Shipyard" in Vela Luka (now Croatia), the last vessel was completed in 1987. Due to an increased requirement for inland waterway transport, a detachment of assault boats were moved from the Adriatic coast to the "Brodotehnika Shipyard" in Belgrade for complete overhaul before commencing service in the River Flotilla in 1995. An unknown number of landing craft is believed to have undergone a refit in 2009.
	Yugoslavia	No class	River patrol boat	ČMP-22 ČMP-23 ČMP-24	River patrol boat (ЧМП - Чамац моторни патролни; ČMP - Čamac motorni patrolni) The ČMP is armed with 12 mm gun mounted on the bow. Built in 1979 at "Greben Shipyard" in Vela Luka (now Croatia). Transferred from the Border Police to the River Flotilla in 2006.
	Serbia	No class	Multirole fast combat boat	"Premax 39"	Multirole fast combat boat (Вишенаменски брзи борбени чамац; Višenamenski brzi borbeni čamac) High-performance craft designed for a wide range of security activities.
RIB 720	China	RIB 720	Rigid hull inflatable boat	10	RIB 720 rigid inflatable boat (Неборбени чамац; Neborbeni čamac) The boats of this type are capable of transporting 15 troops or 3.6 tonnes of cargo. Donation from China in 2016. In use with 93rd Diving Company.
PRB-36 "Šabac"	Yugoslavia	RSRB-36 "Šabac"	Degaussing vessel	PRB-36 "Šabac"	PRB-36 Šabac degaussing vessel (ПРБ - Помоћни речни брод; PRB - Pomoćni rečni brod) Used to degauss river vessels up to a length of 50 m, it can transport 80 troops and is armed with 20 mm Oerlikon anti-aircraft gun and 4x MTU-4 S Strela 2M surface-to-air missiles. Built in 1984 at "Brodotehnika Shipyard" in Belgrade under development code RSRB - Rečna stanica za razmagnetisanje brodova (Vessel Degaussing River Station).
	Yugoslavia	RPN-43	Replenishment tanker	RPN-43	RPN-43 replenishment tanker (РПН - Речна пениша нафте; RPN - Rečna peniša nafte) The ship supplies fuel to other vessels of the River Flotilla. The full displacement of the ship is 90 tons, and it has the ability to load 45 tons of fuel, with 3 tons of its own stock. Built in 1955 at "Josip Broz Tito Shipyard" in Belgrade.

=== Engineering Vehicles ===
Engineering vehicles
Vehicles	Origin	Name	Type	Quantity
	Soviet Union	PTS-M	Amphibious transport vehicle	12
	Yugoslavia	PM M71	Mobile pontoon bridge	
	Serbia	RPR M68	Bridging boat	

== Training ==
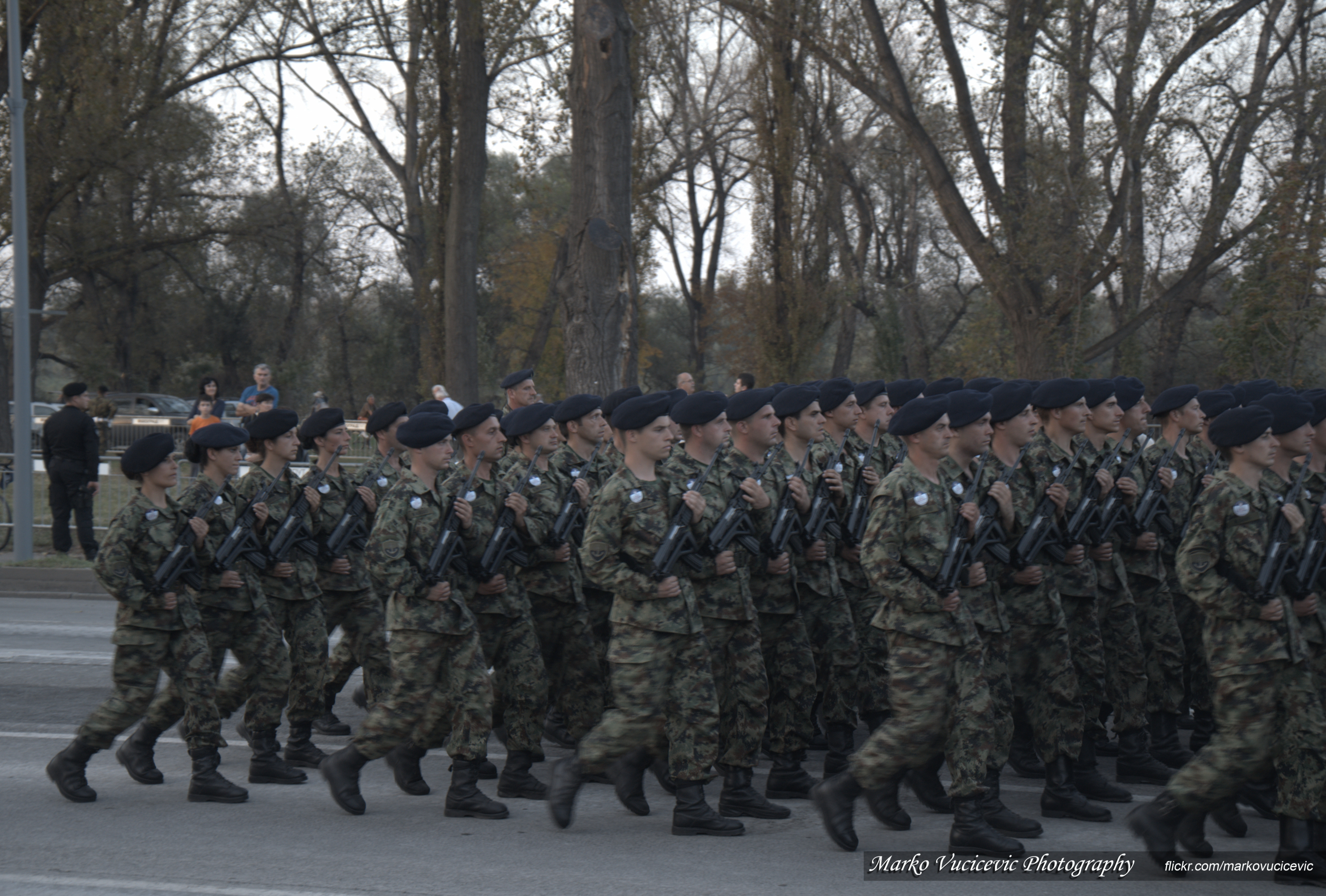
Members of the River Flotilla on parade

Members of the River Flotilla are educated and trained at the Nautical Department of the Serbian Military Academy which offers courses in Serbian and English for domestic and international military and civilian students. Boat crews are trained to operate vessels for day and night operations in accordance with national standards and International Maritime Organization safety standards. The River Flotilla primarily conducts training for boat safety, navigation, night vision, communications, operator maintenance, high‐speed maneuvering, handling weapons (including crew‐served weapons) and other individual and collective skills unique to riverine craft operating in a riverine environment.

=== Exercises ===
The River Flotilla regularly conducts live-fire and manoeuvre exercises with both domestic and international military, public safety and riverine forces including, Croatia, Hungary, Bulgaria, and Romania. Exercises generally involve anti-terrorism and disaster relief scenarios and often include live firing against land and water targets.

==== Multinational exercises ====
Since 2011, the Serbian River Flotilla and the Hungarian Danube Flotilla, have jointly conducted the week-long exercise series dubbed "Iron Cat", alternating locations every year. The aim of the exercise series is to enhance bilateral cooperation and improve the application of tactics, techniques and procedures of both river units while building mutual trust. Both the Serbians and the Hungarians operate the Neštin class river minesweepers.

Iron Cat 2019 - held in Serbia at the training ground "Titel" and focused on the protection of river traffic, including mine detection, deactivating and destroying underwater mines, anti-ship actions and anti-terrorism actions.

Iron Cat 2018 - held between Budapest and Mohács, Hungary included training in explosive ordnance disposal, river policing, border surveillance and border control, patrol activities, arresting and occupying hostile vessels, escorting and protecting dignitaries and cargo, and river closures. Serbian and Hungarian vessels also conducted live-fire training against air and water targets.

Iron Cat 2017 - held near Banoštor, Serbia included training in the blockade and control of inland waterways due to migratory and terrorist threats in the region.

Iron Cat 2016 - held in Budapest, Hungary included training in protection of cargo ships from attack, securing and blockade of the river.

Iron Cat 2015 - tactival live fire exercise held at the Serbian artillery training ground "Titel" on the Tisa River.

Iron Cat 2014 - tactical live fire exercise held at the Hungarian Defence Forces Várpalota range in Hungary included joint minesweeping activities.

Iron Cat 2013 - tactical live fire exercise at the Serbian artillery training ground "Titel" on the Tisa River.

Iron Cat 2012 - tactical live fire exercise at the Hungarian Defence Forces Várpalota range included shooting ground-based targets on the using the 20mm PAV-1 and PAV-4 autocannons.

Iron Cat 2011 - tactical life fire exercise at the Serbian artillery training ground "Titel" on the Tisa River in Serbia South Bačka District, Serbia.

International Army Games 2016 - 86 members of 1st and 2nd Pontoon battalions and 93rd Diving Company won third place at Russian International Army Games during the "Open water" competition held in Murom, on the Oka River.

==== Domestic exercises ====
Begej 2019 - Live Fire Tactical Training (LFTT) exercise held on the Tisa River at the training ground "Titel" including river and special assault, ship fire support, establishment of a bridge crossing point, as well as aircraft strikes.

Blue Route 2019 - Live Fire Tactical Training (LFTT) exercise held on the Tisa River at the Titel training ground conducting a twentyfour-hour check of readiness of the Quick Reaction Naval Combat Group composed of a command ship and three ships of different types.

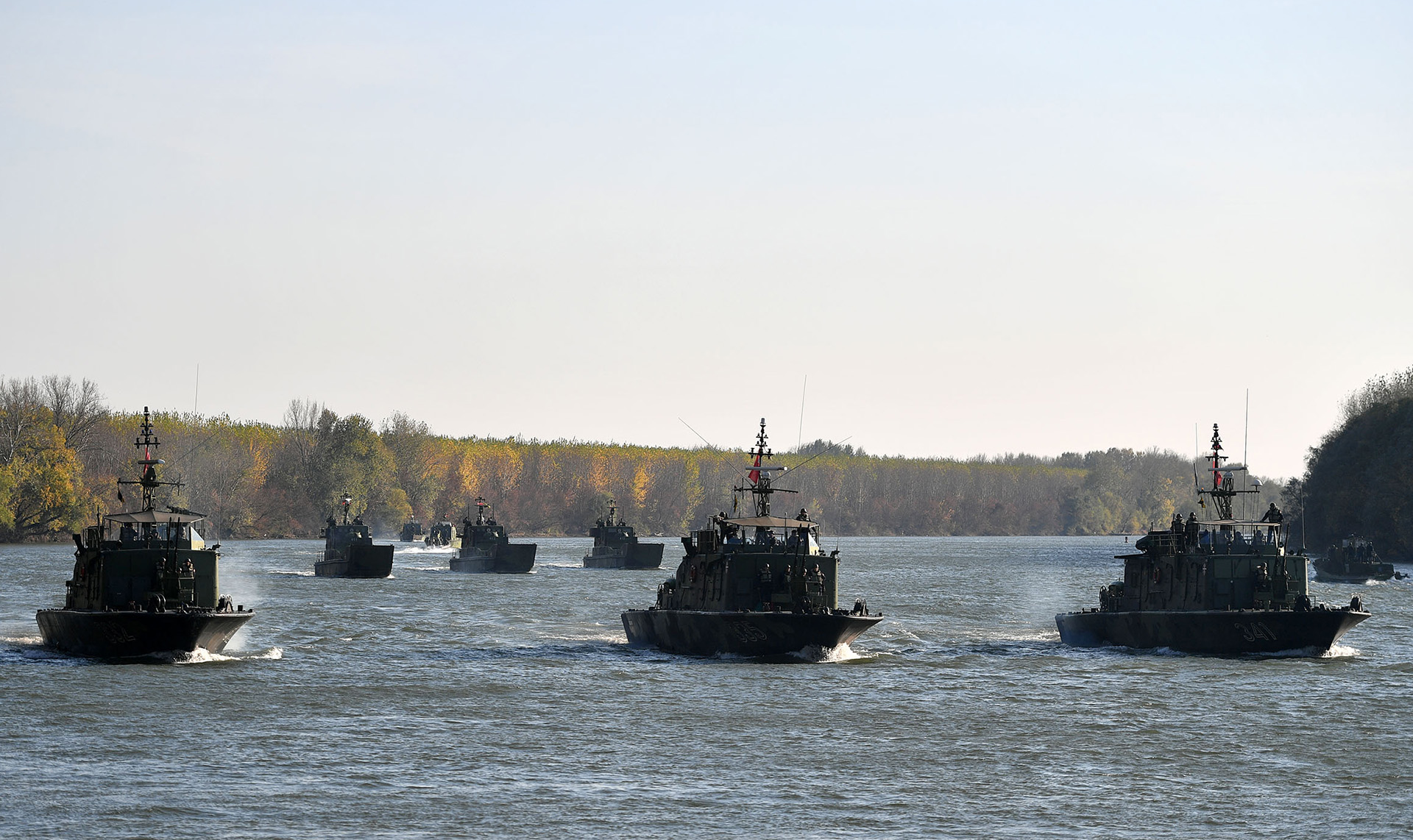
Century of Victory 1918-2018 exercise at Titel

Century of Victory 1918-2018 - joint River Flotilla and the then-Special Brigade exercise in 100th anniversary of the end of the World War I. The exercise involved the display of anti-sabotage effects of submersible divers, the action of a group of ships and patrol boats, amphibious and multi-purpose ships in the firing of combat.

Otter 2018 - Live Fire Tactical Training (LFTT) exercise held at training ground "Taraš" near Zrenjanin training River Flotilla command and units and pontoon battalions in the conduct of river assaults, defending waterways and forced river crossings.

Ečka 2017 - anti-terrorist and anti-mining exercise of the 1st River Detachment and 93rd Diving Company at the training ground "Titel" on the Tisa River.

Blue Dolphin 2016 - Live Fire Tactical Training (LFTT) exercise at the training ground "Taraš" on the Tisa River near Zrenjanin as part of "Morava 2016" command-post exercise.

Blue Response 2014 - tactical live shooting exercise at the Serbian artillery training ground "Titel" on the Tisa River included artillery and close air support training in support of a forced river crossing.

Tisa 2012 - three-day trilateral exercise including Serbia, Romania and Hungary held at training ground "Mačvanski partizanski odred" near Šabac, Serbia included training in assisting civilian populations affected by the floods caused by the outflow of the Sava river.

== Traditions ==
=== Anniversary ===
The anniversary of the unit is celebrated on August 19. On that date (O.S. August 6)in 1915 Kingdom of Serbia received its first true warship, the patrol boat "Jadar", on August 19 (O.S. August 6), 1915 and that date is commemorated as the establishment of the modern River Flotilla.

=== Patron saint ===
The unit's slava or its patron saint is Saint Stefan Štiljanović.

== Ranks ==
=== Officers ===
Rank insignia for commissioned officers.

Rank group	General / flag officers				Senior officers			Junior officers
Serbian River Flotilla
Serbian River Flotilla	Адмирал; Admiral	Вицеадмирал; Vitseadmiral	Контраадмирал; Kontraadmiral	Комодор; Komodor	Капетан бојног брода Kapetan bojnog broda	Капетан фрегате Kapetan fregate	Капетан корвете Kapetan korvete	Поручник бојног брода Poručnik bojnog broda	Поручник фрегате Poručnik fregate	Поручник корвете Poručnik korvete	Потпоручник; Potporučnik

=== Enlisted ===
The rank insignia of non-commissioned officers and enlisted personnel.

Rank group	Senior NCOs					Junior NCOs		Enlisted
Serbian River Flotilla
Serbian River Flotilla	Заставник I класе Zastavnik I klase	Заставник; Zastavnik	Старији Водник I класе Stariji Vodnik I klase	Старији Водник; Stariji Vodnik	Водник; Vodnik	Млађи водник Mlađi vodnik	Десетар; Desetar	Разводник; Razvodnik	Војник; Vojnik

== Gallery ==
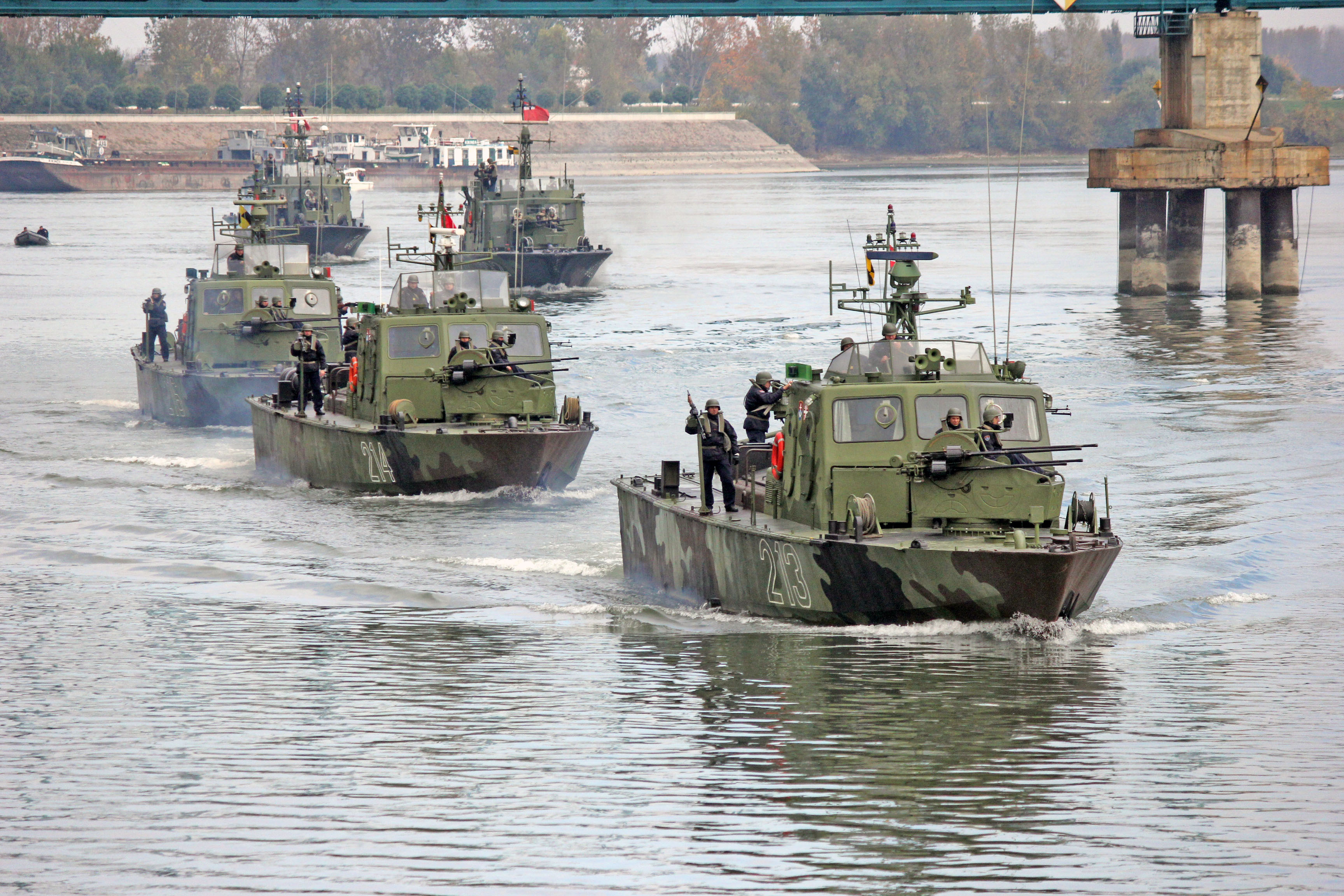

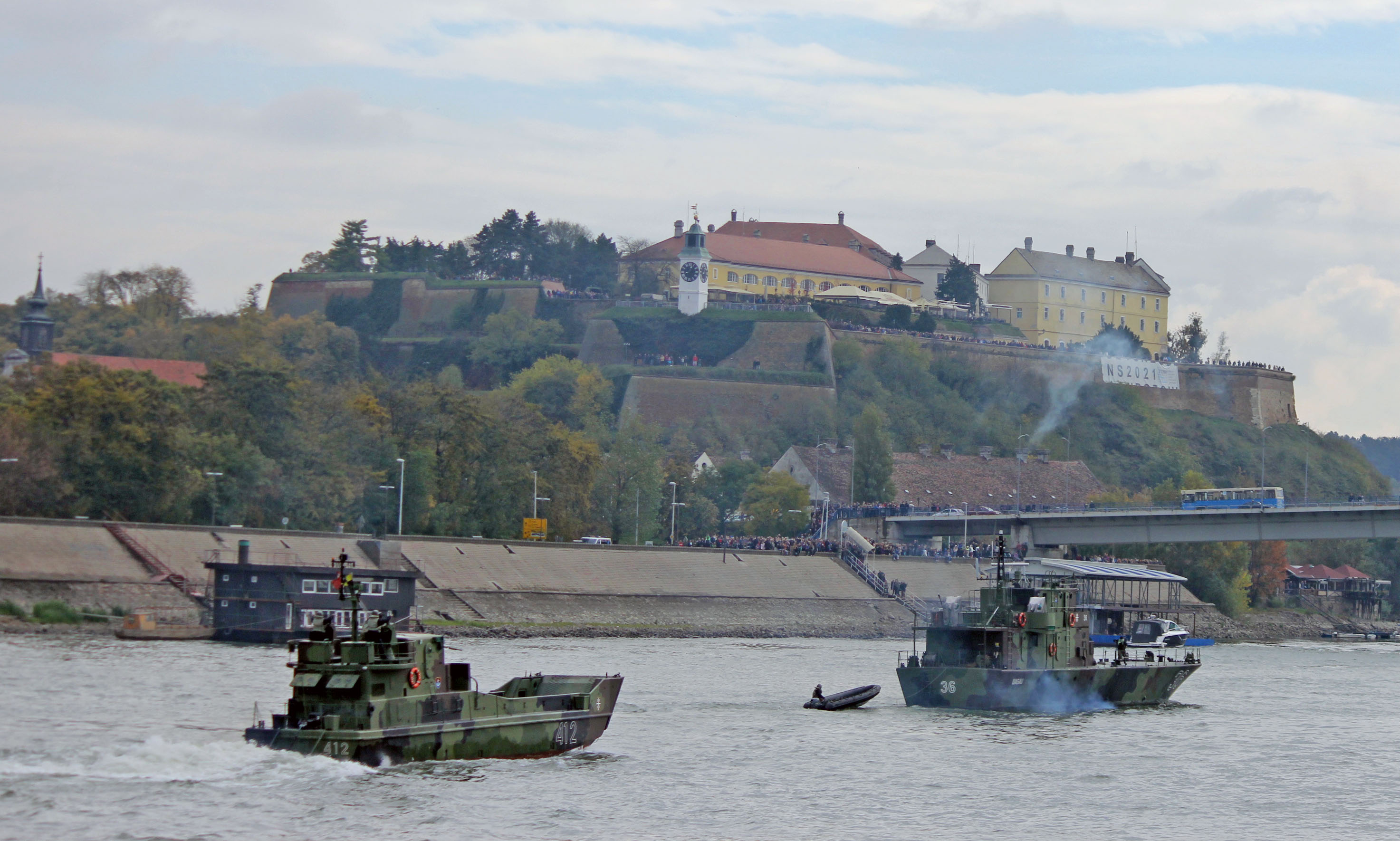

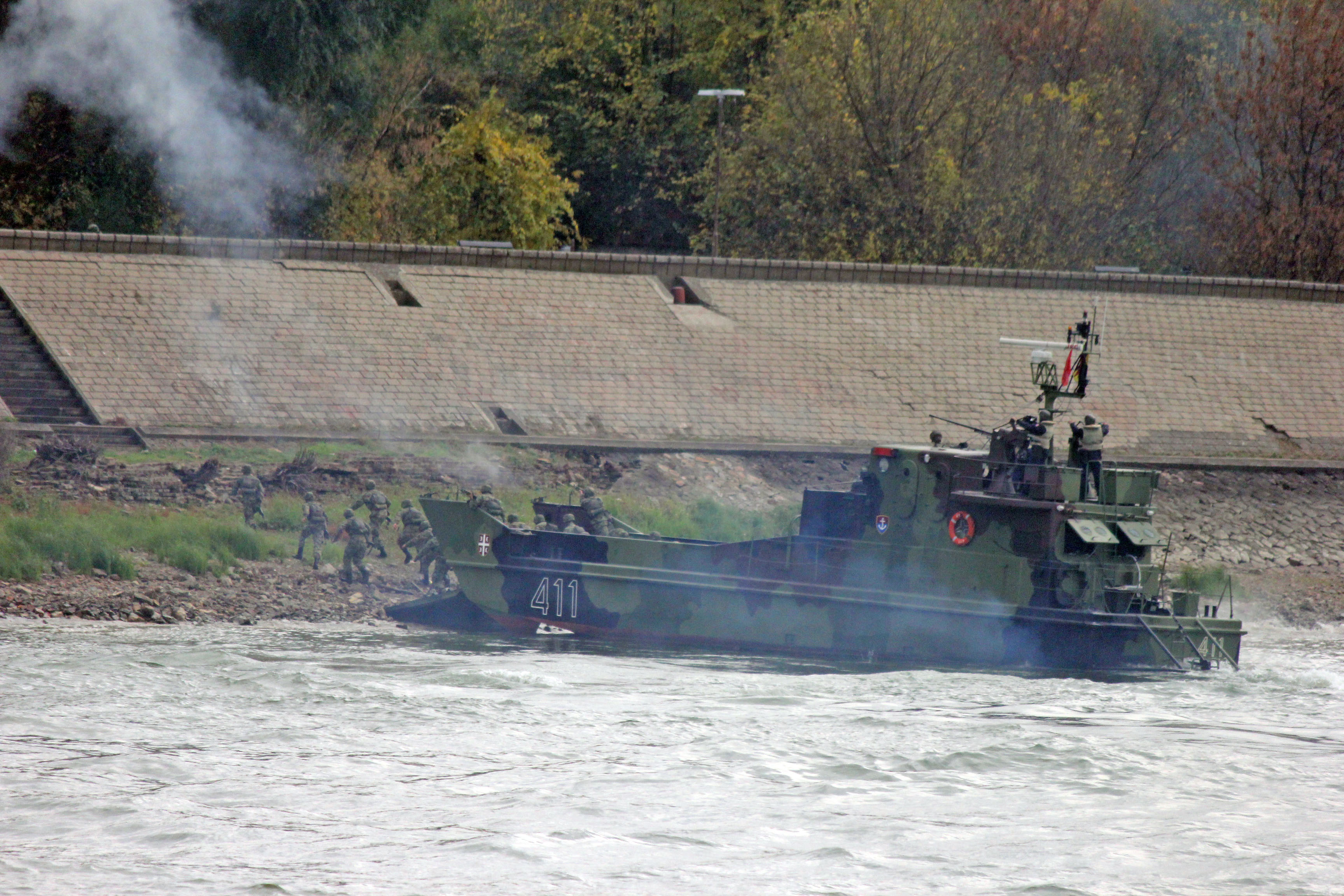

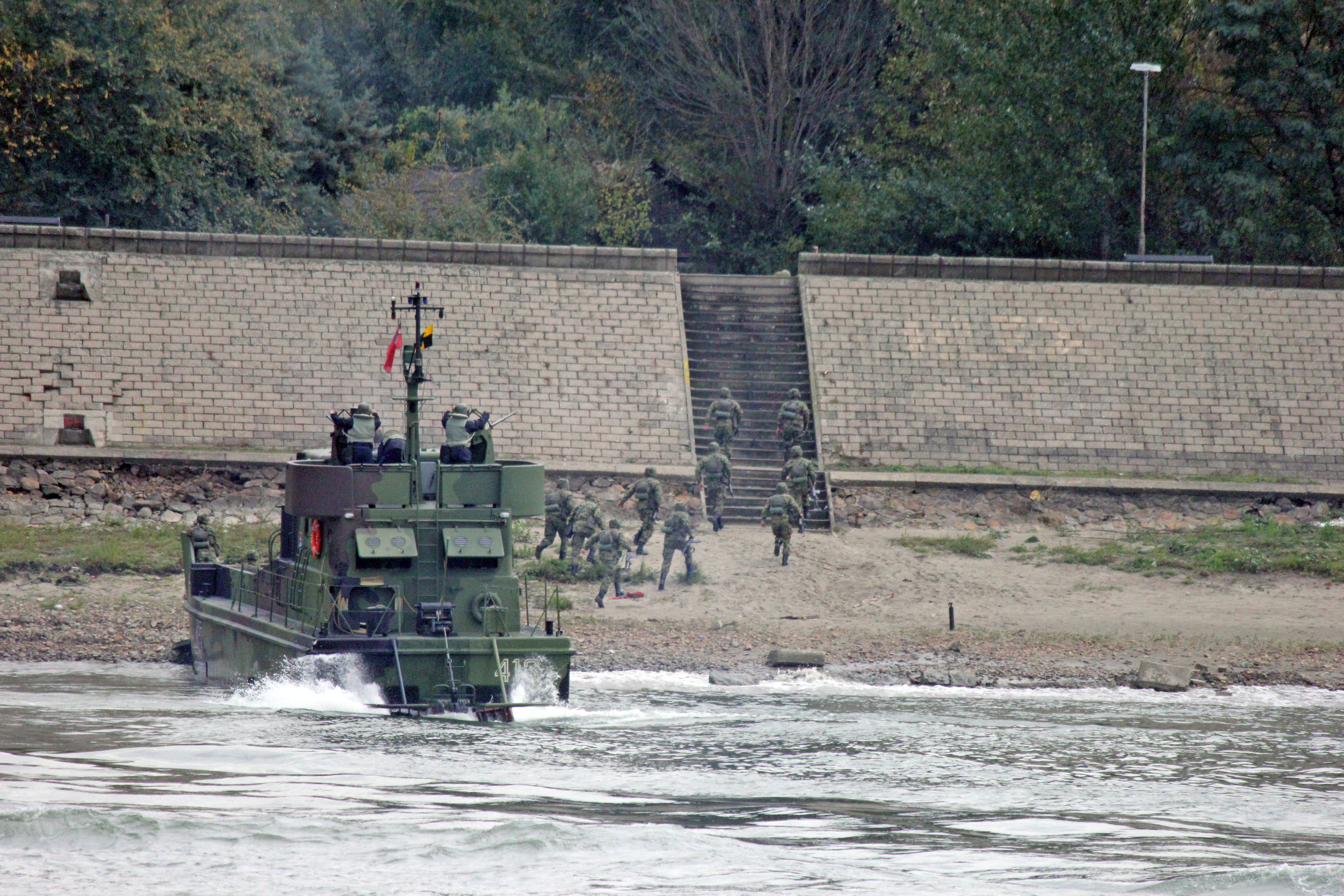

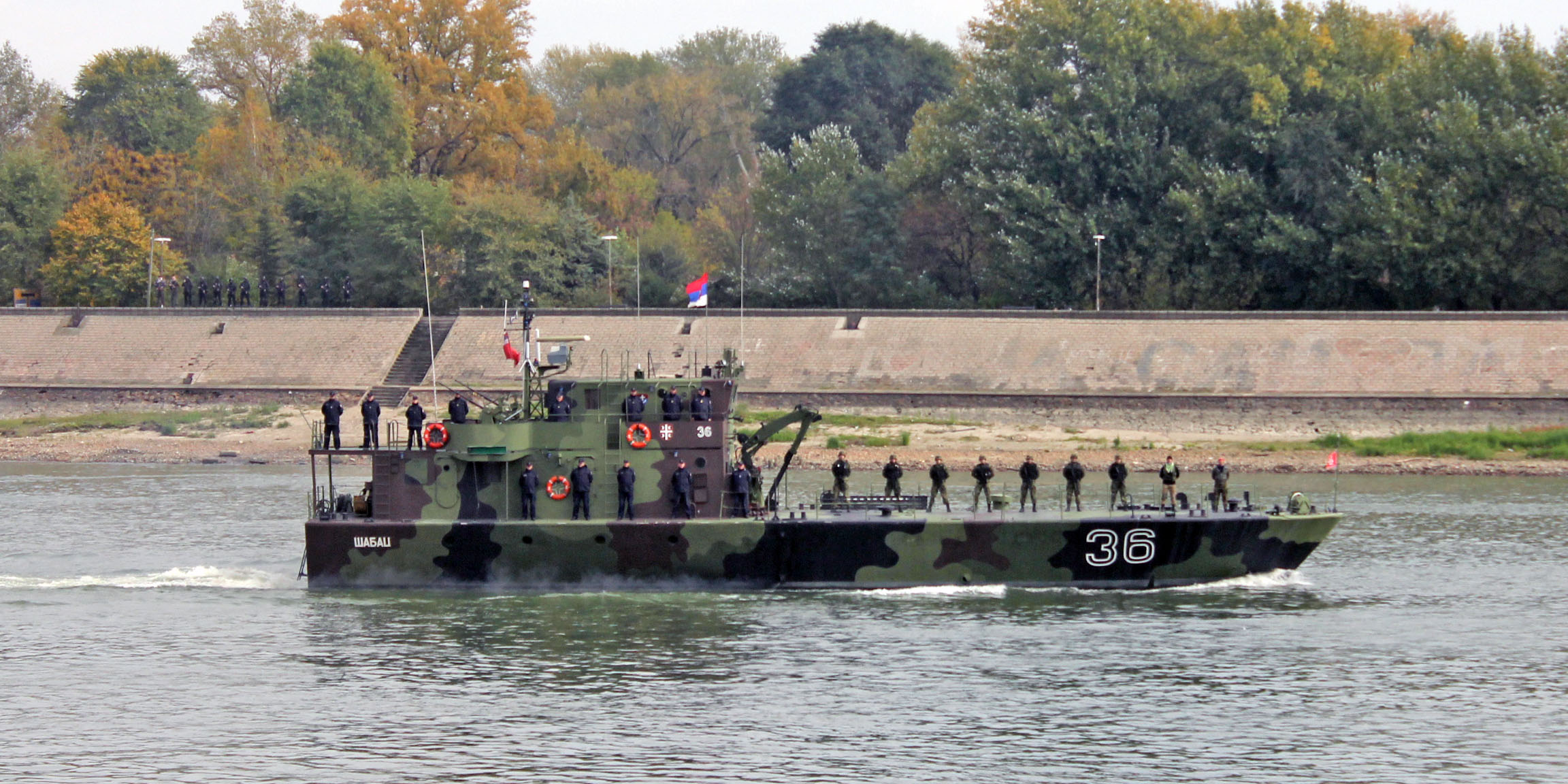

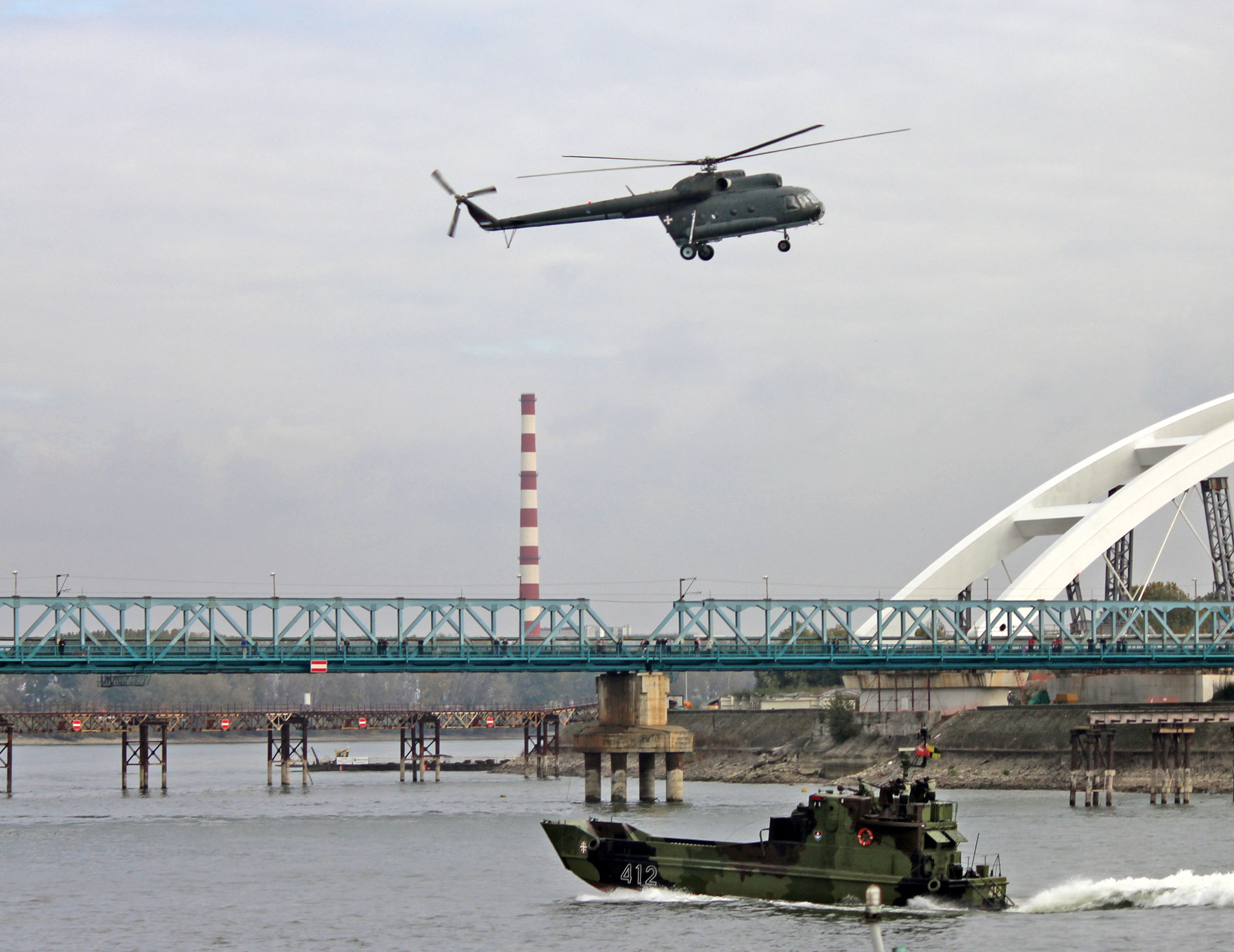

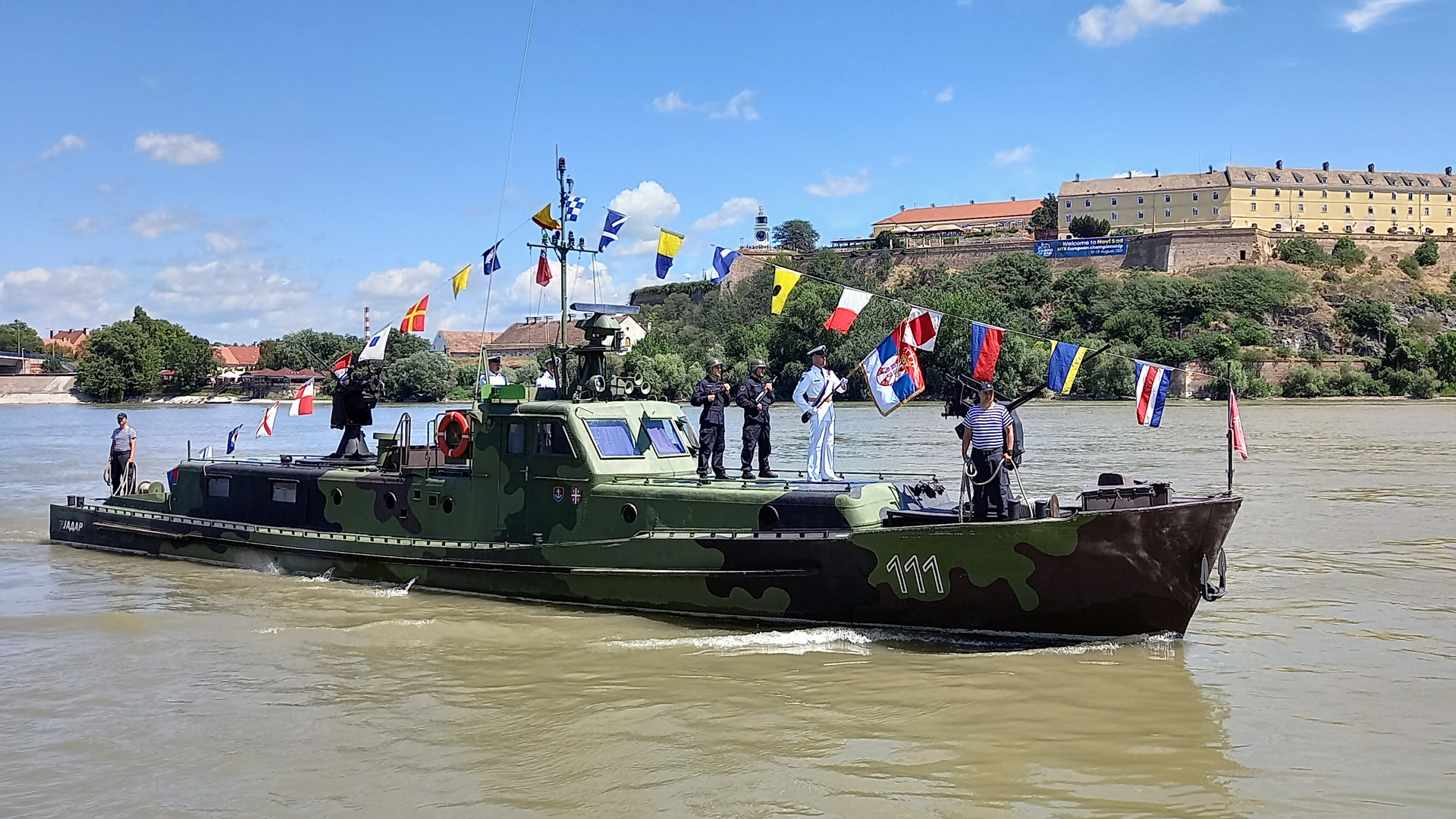

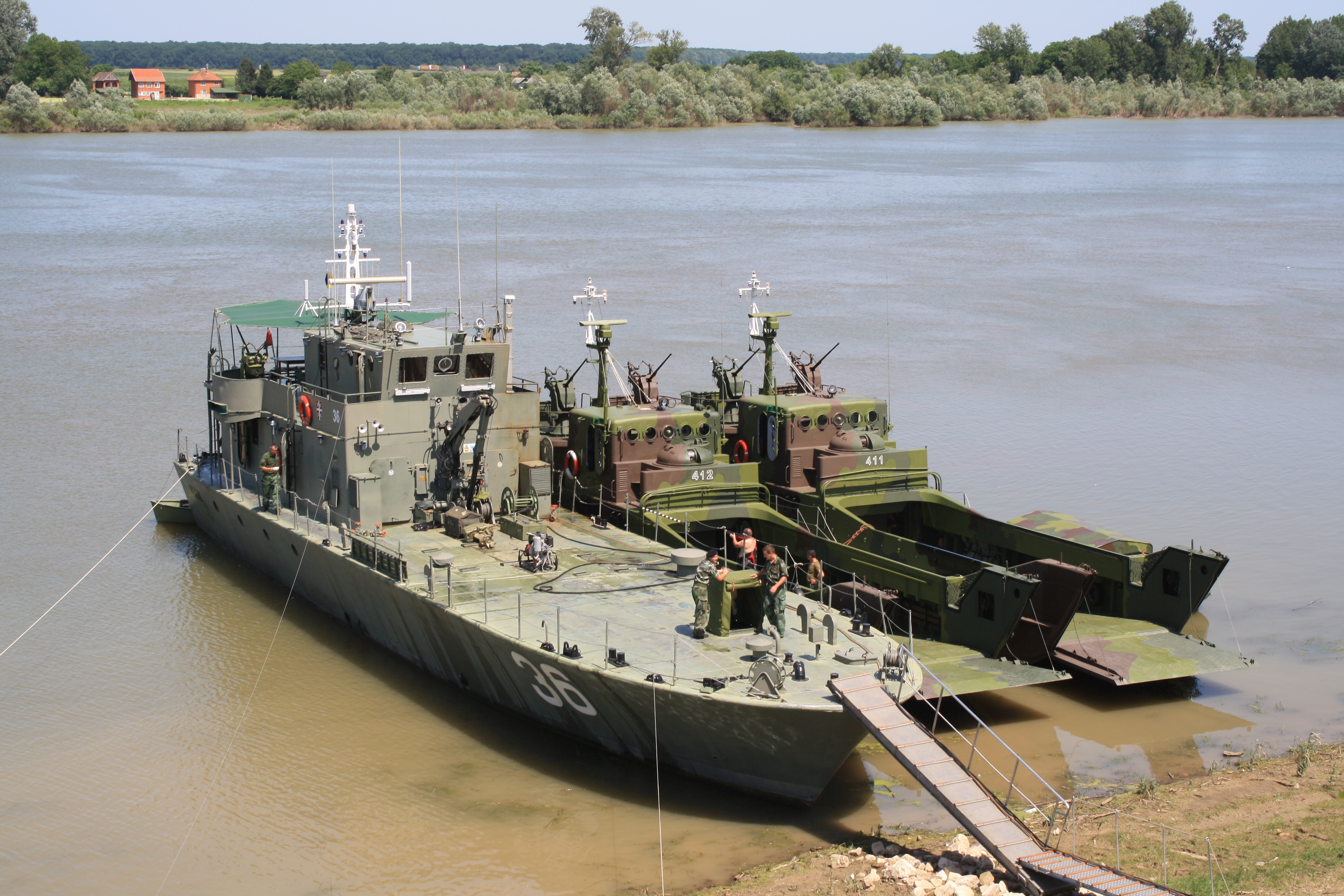

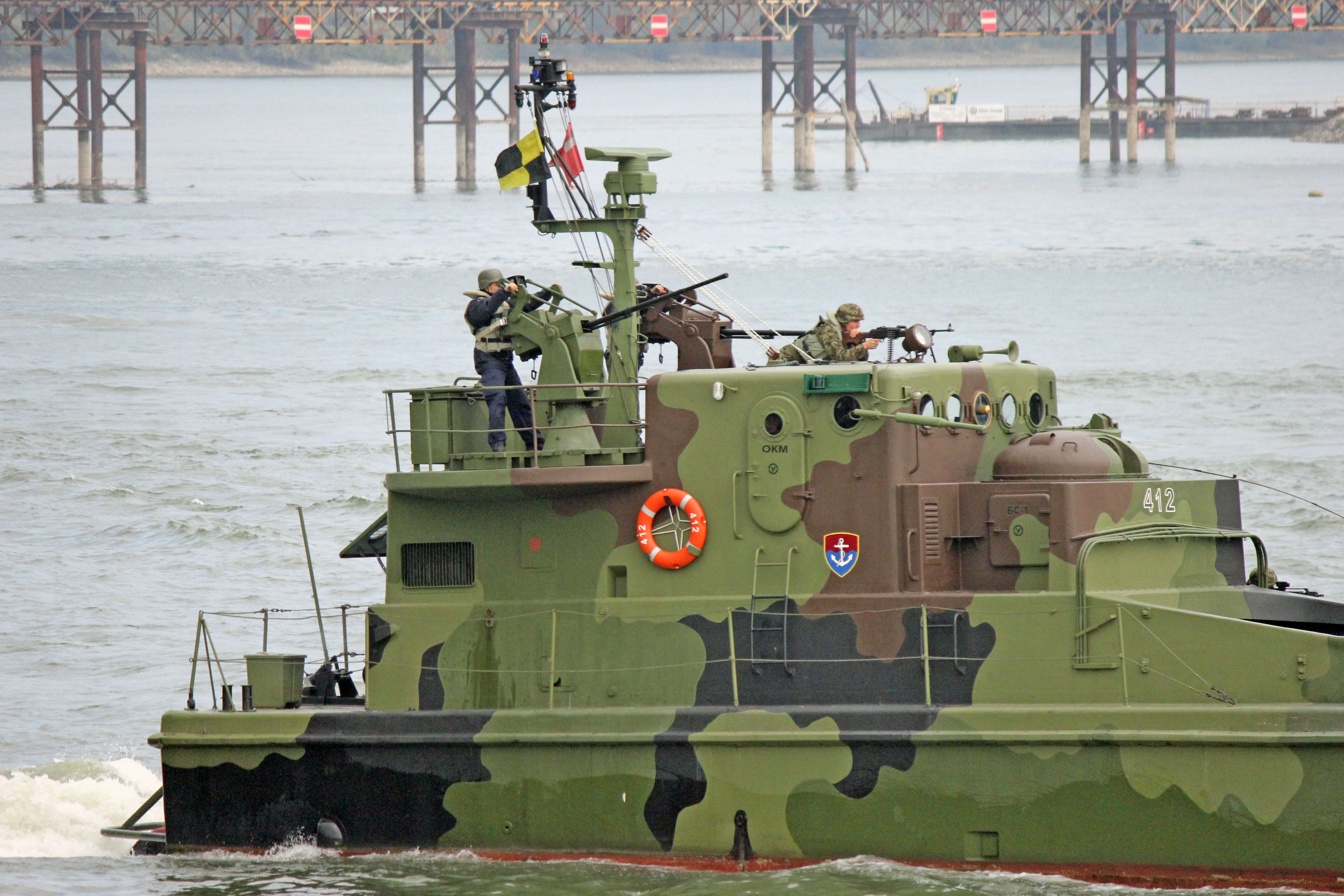

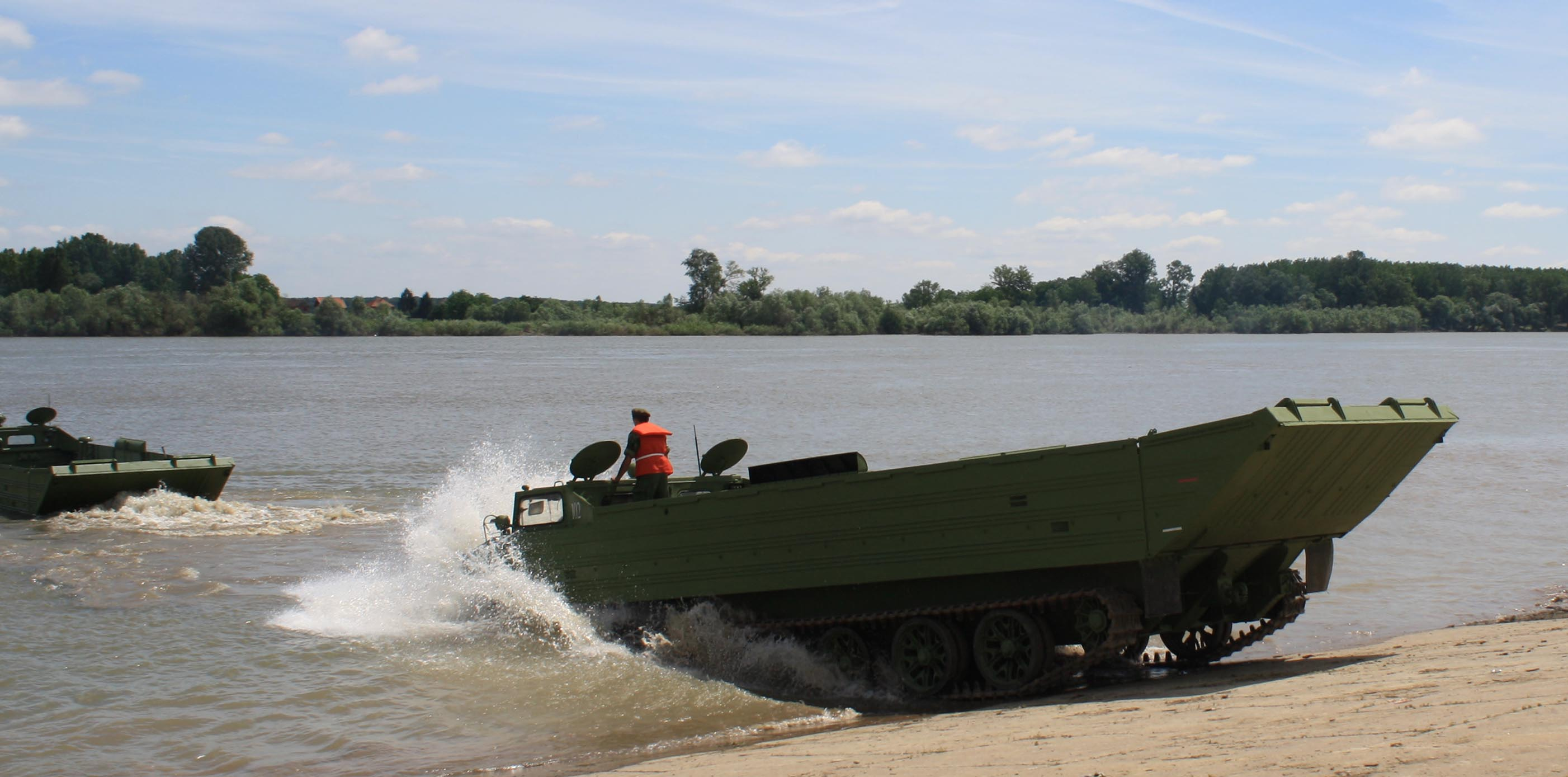

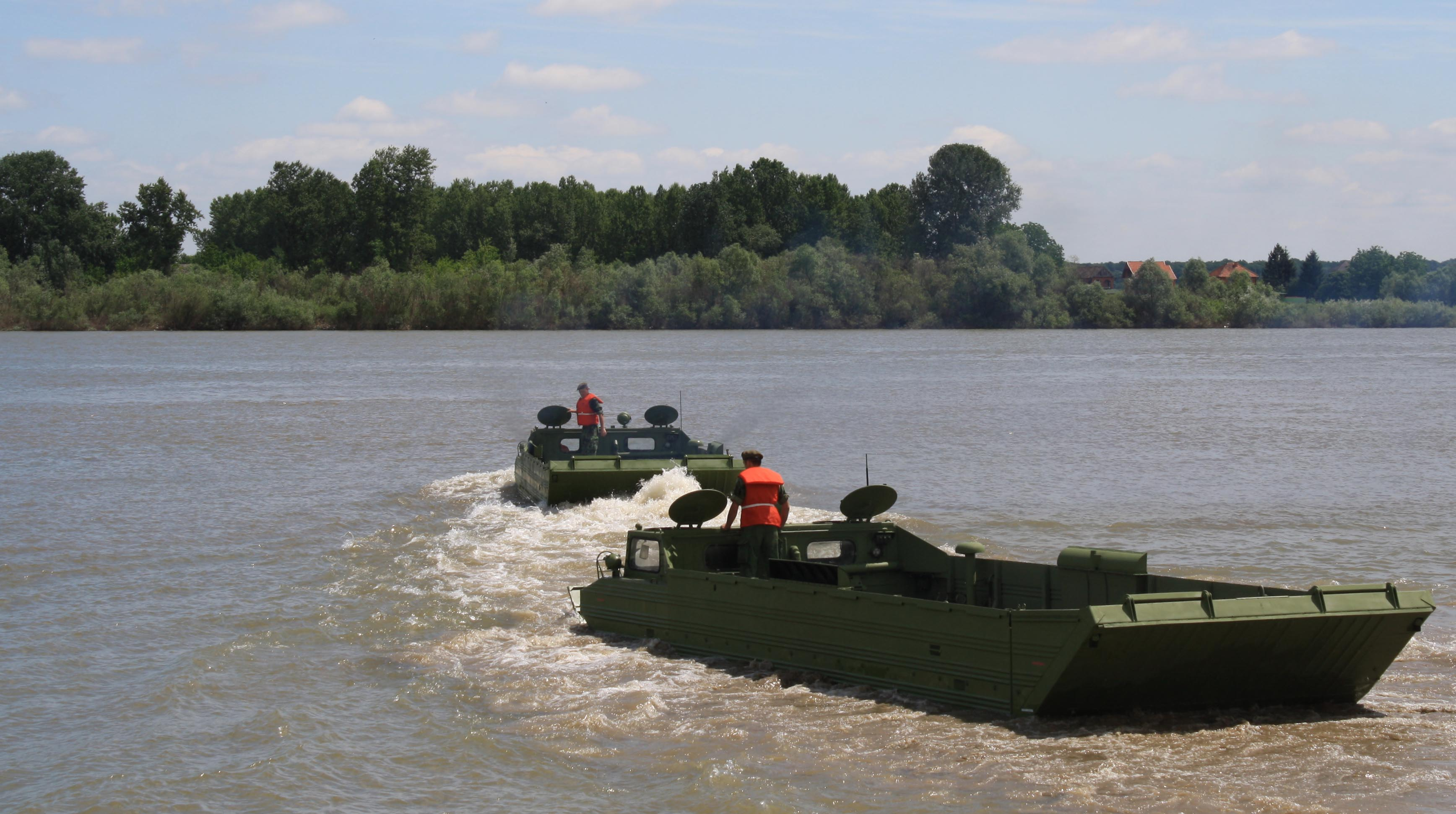

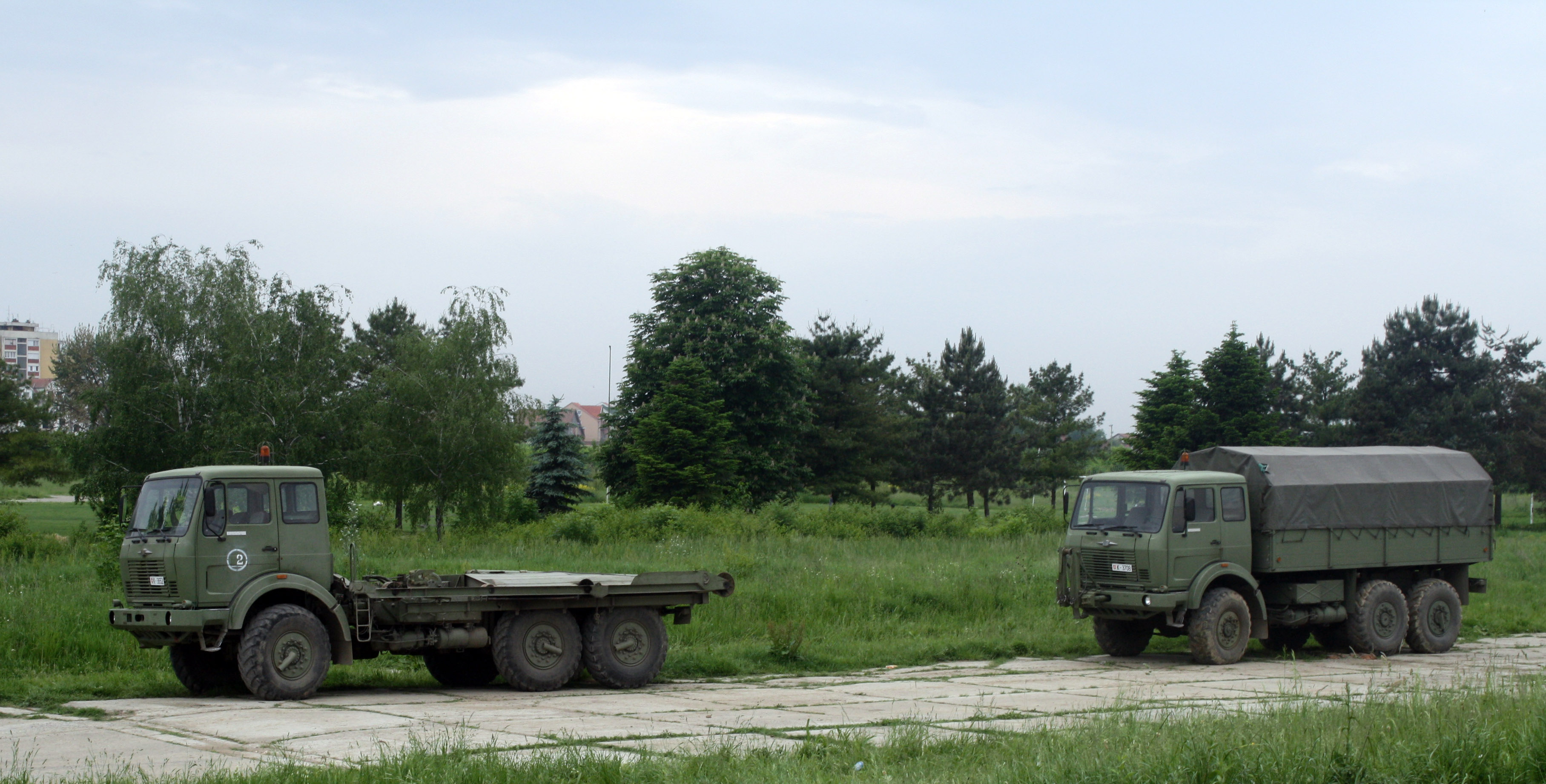

== See also ==
- Šajkaši
- Navies of landlocked countries
