= Nestin =

Nestin may refer to:

- Neštin, a village in Srem, Vojvodina, Serbia.
- Nestin (protein), a type VI intermediate filament (IF) protein.
- Neštin-class river minesweeper, a class of minesweeper built in service with Serbia and Hungary.
