= Navies of landlocked countries =

List of naval forces operated by countries that do not have a coastline

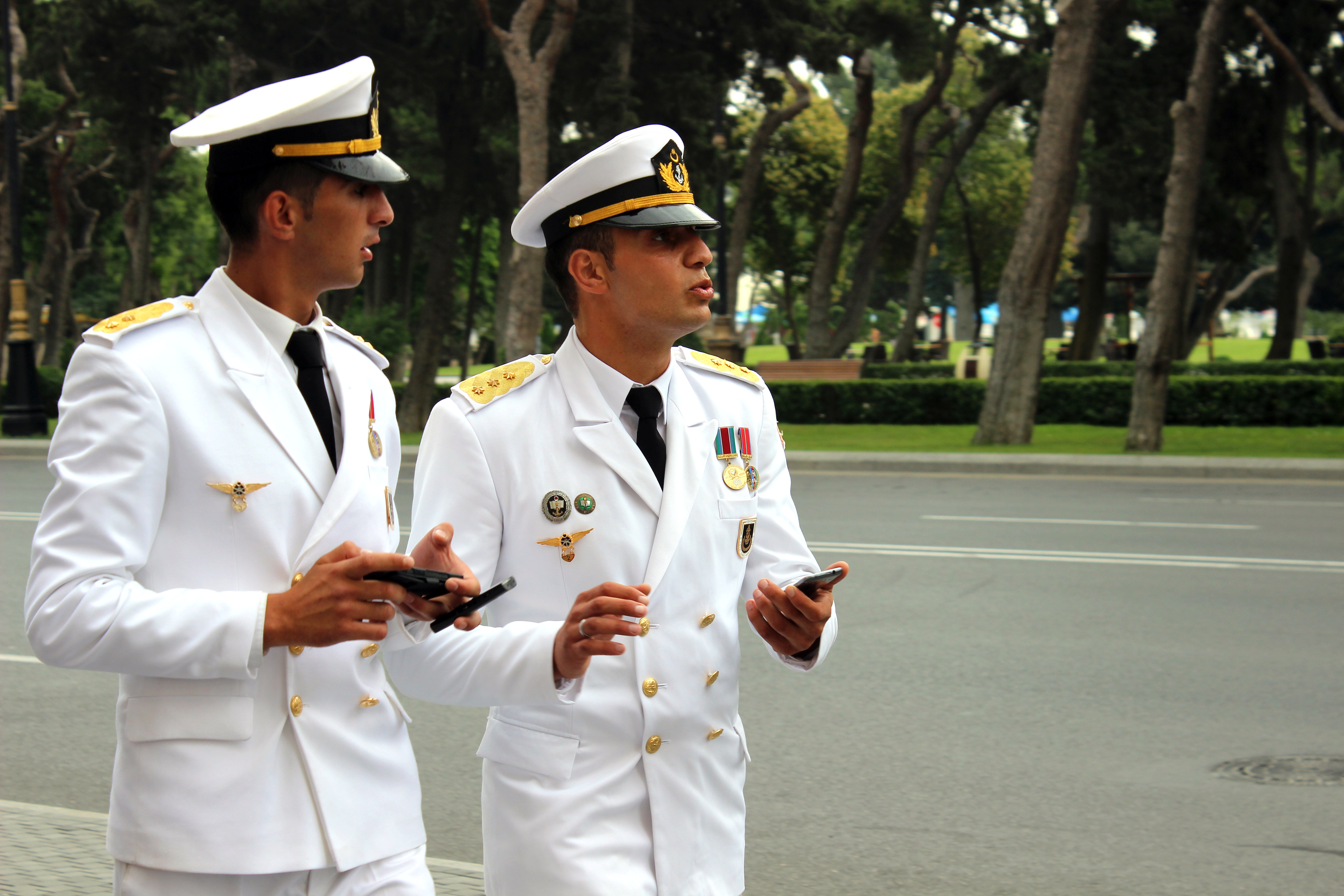
Azerbaijani naval personnel

A landlocked navy is a naval force operated by a country that does not have a coastline. While these states are unable to develop a sea-going, blue-water navy, they may still deploy armed forces on major lakes or rivers. Such forces are often referred to as brown-water navies.

There are several reasons a landlocked country may choose to maintain a navy. If a river or lake forms a national border, countries may feel the need to protect and patrol that border with a military force. In some regions, roads may be unreliable or circuitous, and a river or lake may be the easiest way to move military forces around the country. Sometimes, possession of a body of water may actually be contested – for example, countries around the landlocked Caspian Sea have different views of how ownership should be divided.

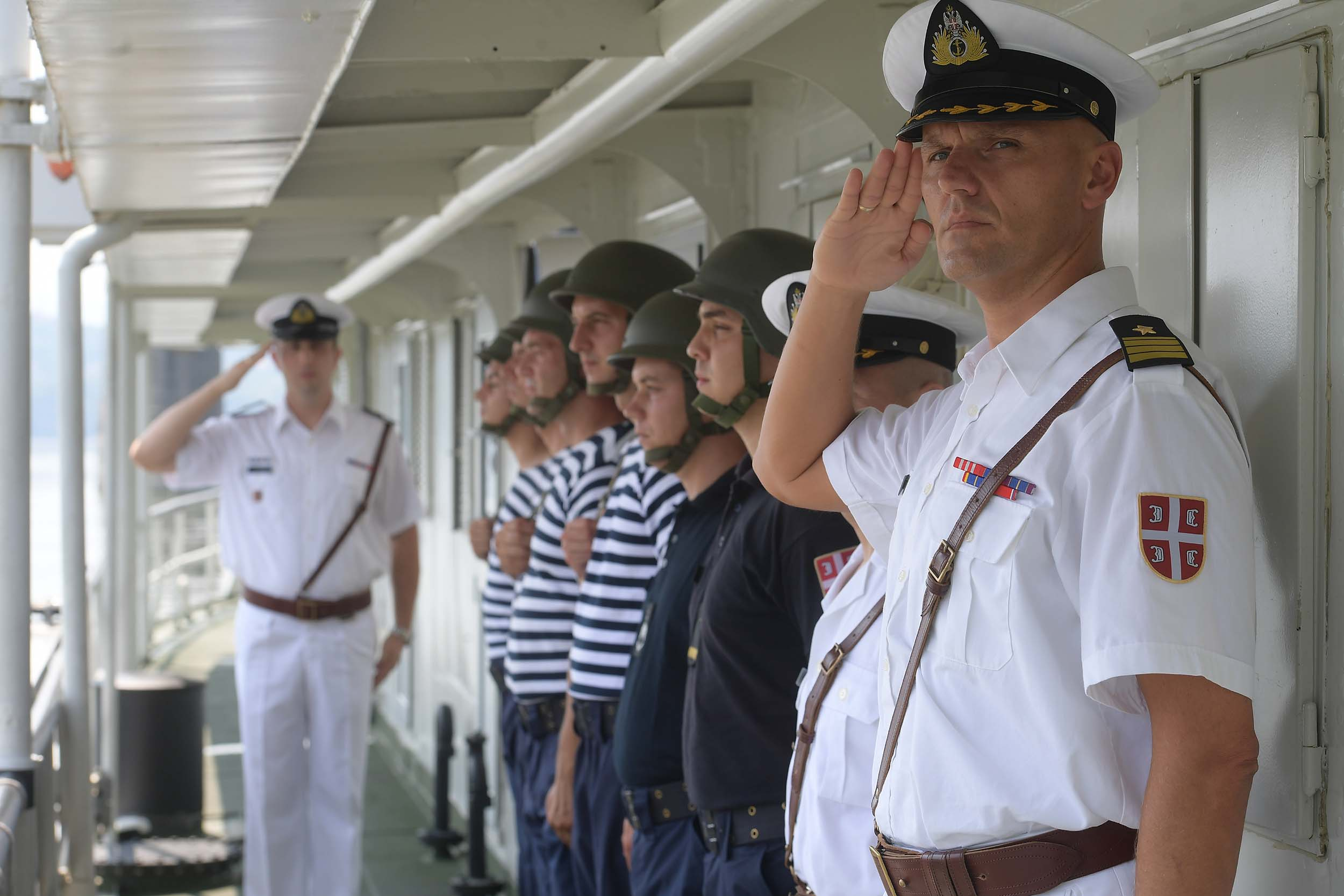
Serbian River Flotilla guard of honor

Patrol boats of various types are the most common craft among landlocked navies. Some landlocked navies possess troop or vehicle transports, allowing ground forces to cross or travel along a lake or river.

The operation of military forces in lakes and rivers is not limited to landlocked countries. Many states maintain these forces in addition to their seagoing navy. They may be part of the same organisation (e.g. the Russian Caspian Flotilla) or not (e.g. U.S. Coast Guard).

== Landlocked countries maintaining a separate naval force ==
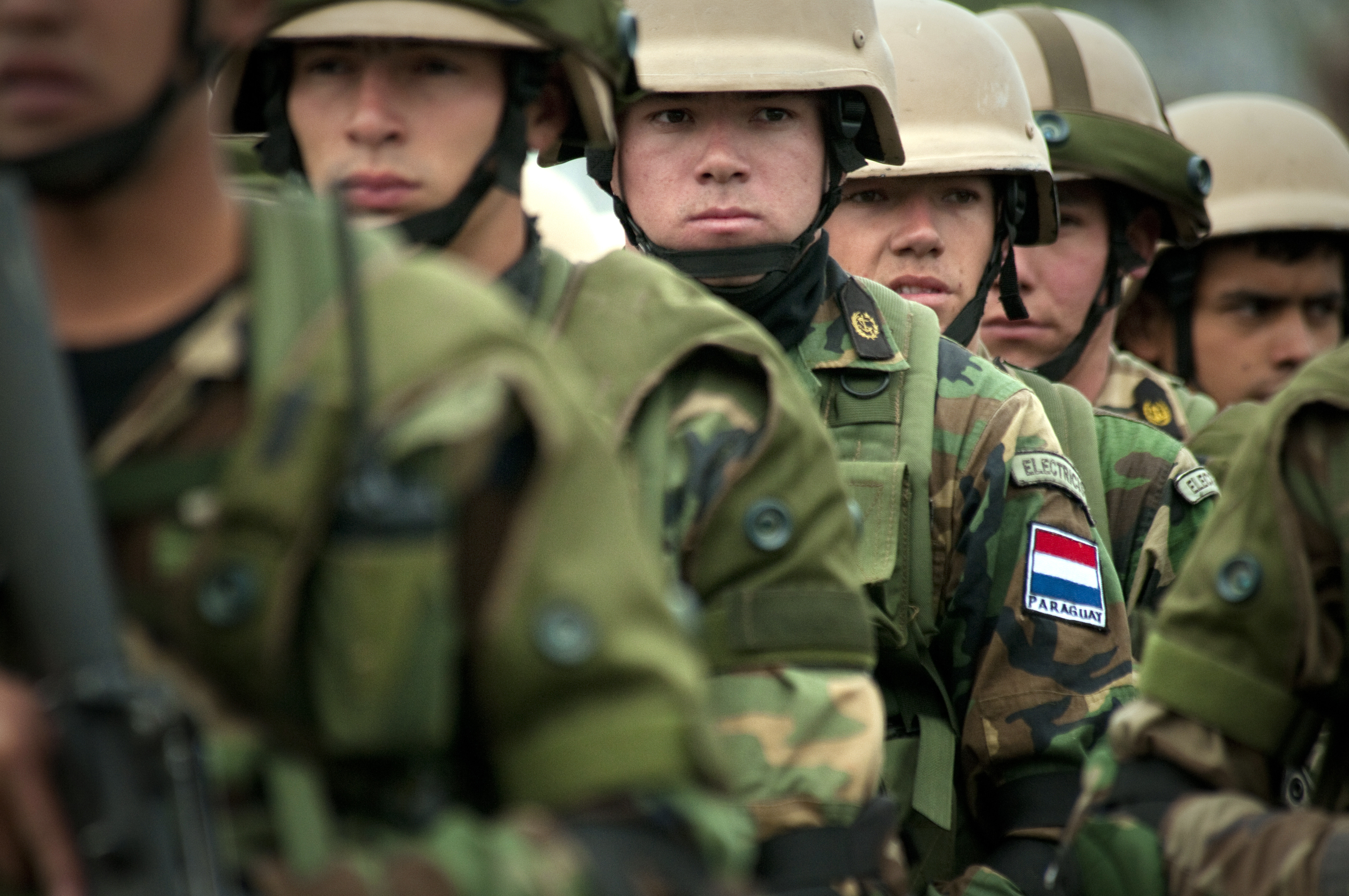
Paraguayan naval infantrymen

- Azerbaijan – Although Azerbaijan borders the Caspian Sea, the Caspian Sea is not connected to any ocean by natural waterway; (Note: The Caspian is connected to the Black Sea via the Volga and Don rivers and a linking 60 km canal that is navigable by seagoing vessels of up to 5,000 gross tons) most authorities thus regard the country as landlocked. The Azerbaijani Navy operates on the Caspian Sea. In 2003, the Russian Volga–Don Canal was used to deliver a cutter given by the US government to the Azerbaijani Navy.
- Bolivia – Bolivia lost access to the Pacific Ocean during the 1879 War of the Pacific. In 1963, the Bolivian government established a freshwater force (Fuerza Fluvial y Lacustre) to patrol Lake Titicaca and Bolivia's larger rivers, consisting of four American-purchased patrol boats and 1,800 personnel recruited from the army. This naval force, renamed the Bolivian Naval Force in 1966, reached a strength of 5,000 personnel in 2008. It also had a naval unit permanently deployed in the Argentine city of Rosario. To Bolivians, the Bolivian Navy serves as a symbol that the country has not given up on regaining its lost access to the sea.
- Ethiopia – Ethiopia established a navy in 1955 but became a landlocked country upon the independence of Eritrea in 1991. The Ethiopian Navy survived until 1996, operating from foreign ports. Today, the Ethiopian National Defense Force operates a single boat on Lake Tana. The Ethiopian Navy was re-established in 2019.
- Kazakhstan, Turkmenistan – Although both countries border the Caspian Sea, the Caspian is not connected to any ocean by natural waterway. By some definitions, this makes the two countries landlocked. Both Kazakhstan and Turkmenistan operate small navies on the Caspian Sea.
- Laos – The Lao People's Navy operates vessels on the Mekong River, a major feature of the country's geography. Because the Mekong makes up a considerable portion of the Laotian border, the Navy is significantly involved in border control work. It is believed to operate two or three dozen small patrol boats.
- Paraguay – The Paraguayan Navy has around a dozen vessels and several thousand personnel. It operates on the country's major rivers, notably the Paraguay River and the Paraná River. Vessels could reach the open sea by traveling downriver through Argentina. The Paraguayan Navy served in the Paraguayan War and in the Chaco War.

== Landlocked countries with non-independent maritime units ==
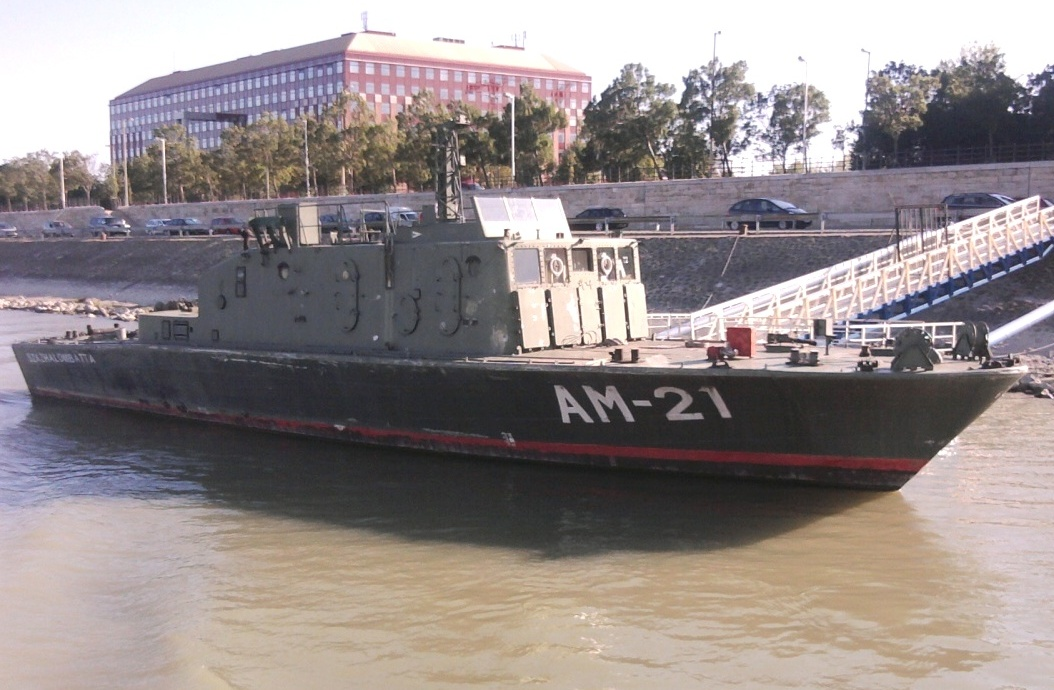
Retired AM-21 Százhalombatta minesweeper in Budapest, other Yugoslav-made Nestin MS-25 minesweepers are still used in Hungary

Other countries operate water-based military forces without actually establishing an independent navy—instead, responsibility may be given to a branch of a different service.

- Burundi – on Lake Tanganyika.
- Central African Republic – A small naval force (Second Battalion of the Ground Forces) is maintained on the Ubangi River, a tributary of the Congo River. The Ubangi forms the country's border with the Democratic Republic of Congo and is a significant transport route.
- Hungary – The Home Defence Pyrotechnician and Warship Battalion of the Hungarian Defence Forces is based in Újpest Port, on the River Danube, in Budapest. In the 2000s, the army bought new minesweepers and restored or retired the old ones. On national holidays warships sail along the River Danube in Budapest.
- Malawi – The Malawian Defence Force maintains a small navy on Lake Malawi.
- Mali – maintains a small riverine patrol force as part of its army.
- Rwanda – The Rwanda Defence Force operates boats on Lake Kivu, between Rwanda and the Democratic Republic of Congo. It was involved in the Second Congo War.
- Serbia – the Serbian Armed Forces operates a river flotilla consisting of minesweepers, patrol boats, and landing craft on the Danube, Tisza, and Sava rivers.
- Switzerland – The Swiss Armed Forces operate Aquarius-class patrol boats on Lake Geneva, Lake Maggiore, Lake Lucerne, Lake Lugano, and Lake Constance, manned by the 10th Motorboat Company of the Engineers Corps.
- Uzbekistan – the Frontier Service operates a River Force consisting of gunboats and other craft on the Amu Darya river.

== Gallery ==
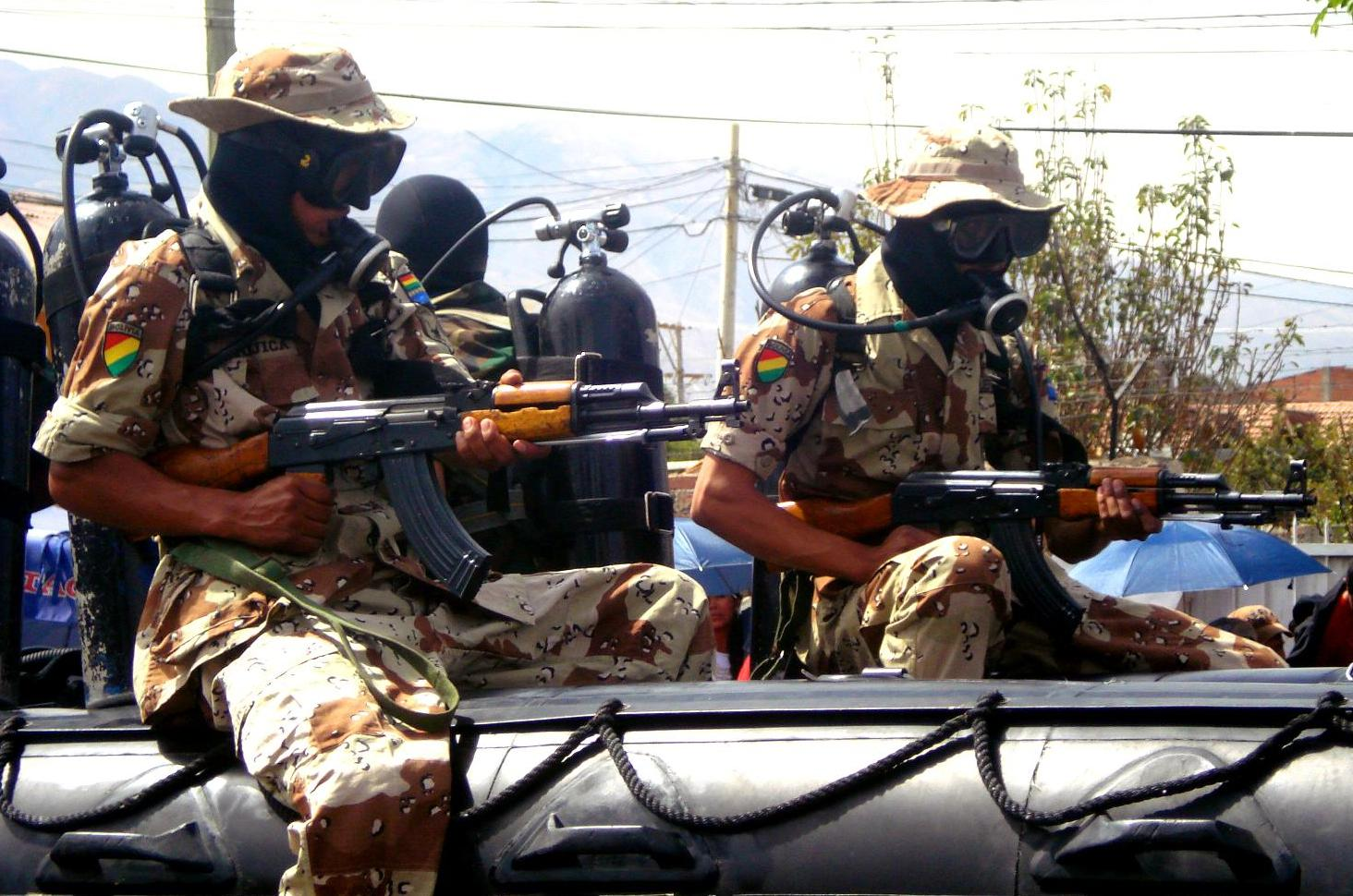
Bolivian naval infantry on top of inflatable boats.

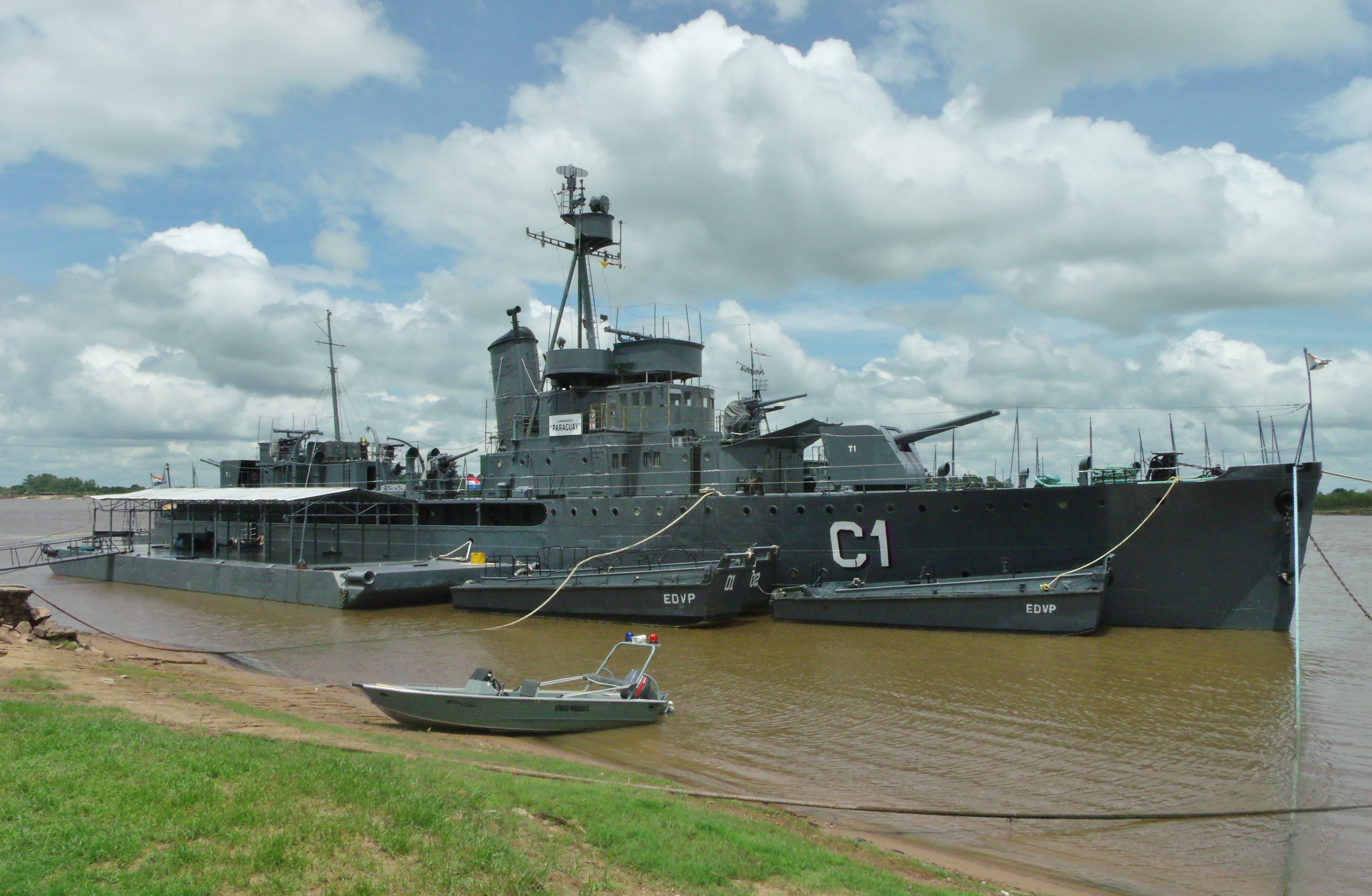
Paraguay navy flagship ARP C-1 Paraguay

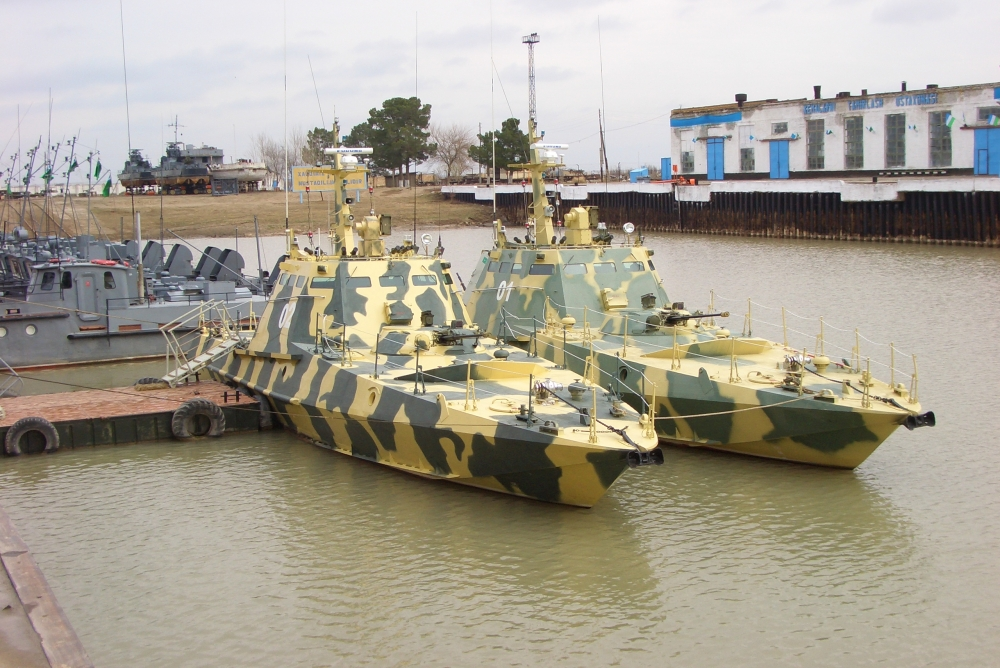
Project 58150 Gyurza boats of the Uzbek River Force

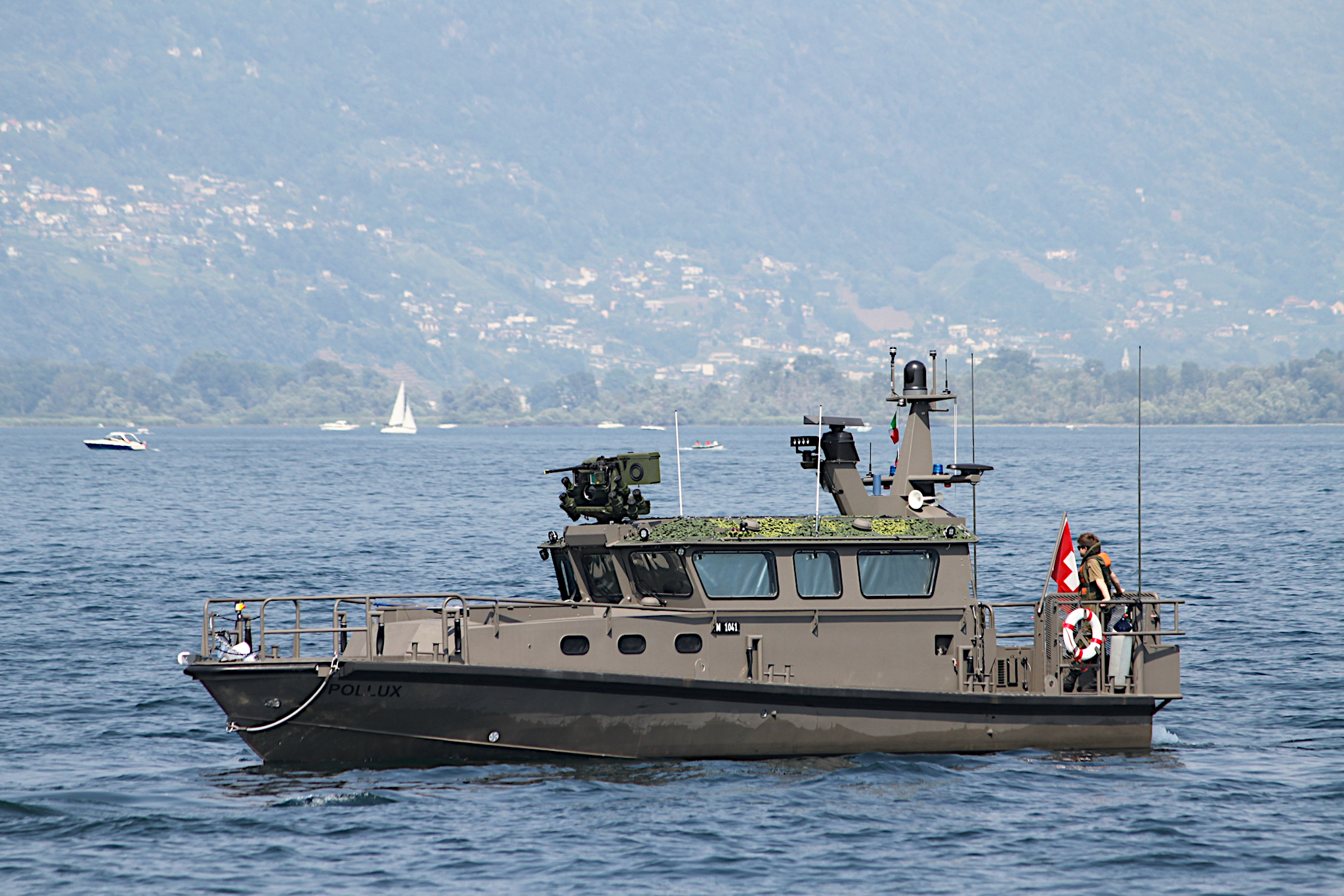
Patrouillenboot 16-class patrol boat of the Swiss lakes flotilla.

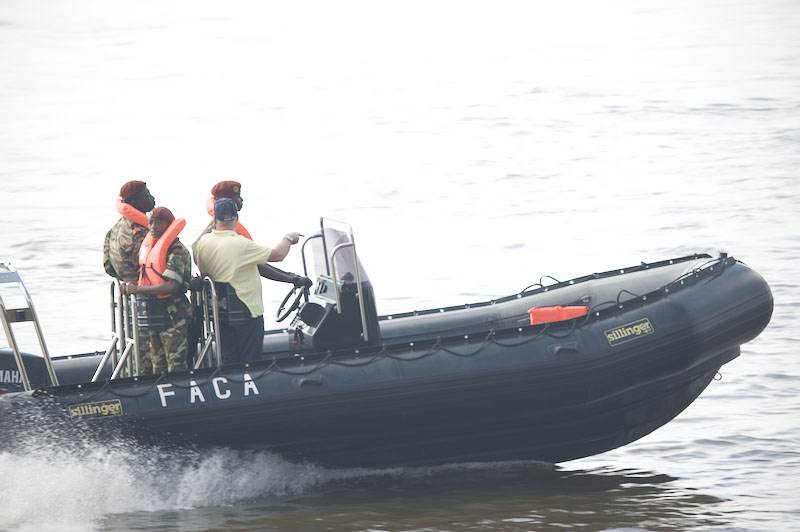
RHIB of the Central African Republic Armed Forces

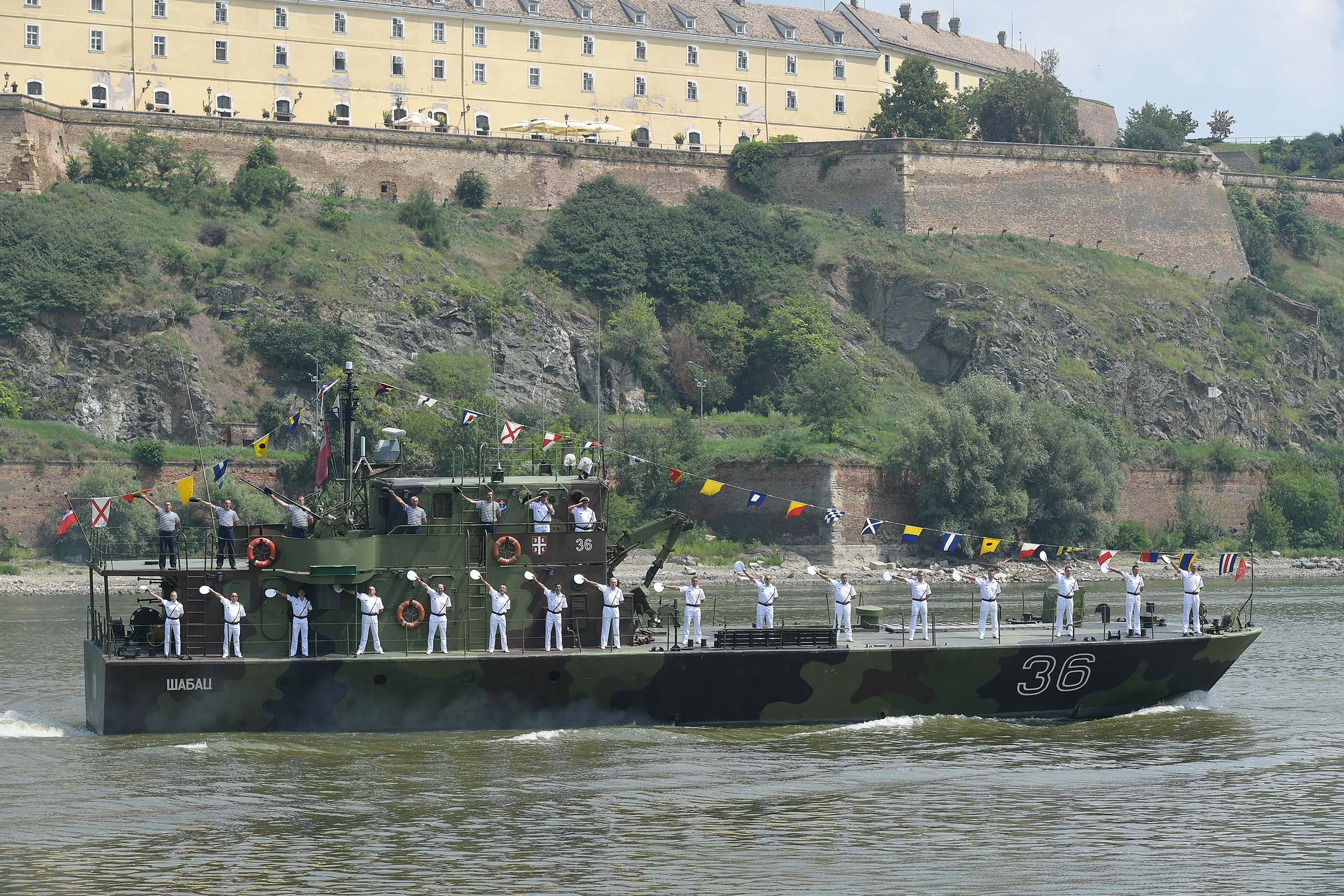
PRB-36 degaussing ship of the Serbian River Flotilla on parade

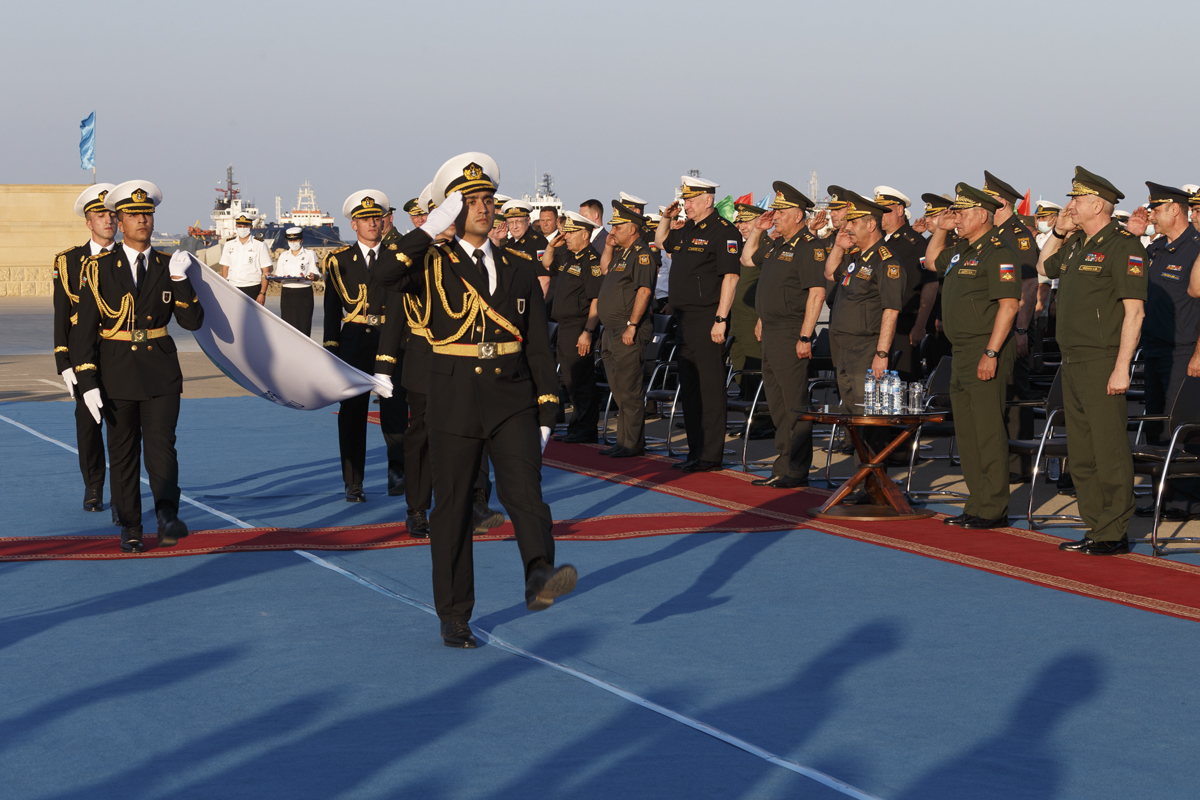
Azerbaijani navy ceremony

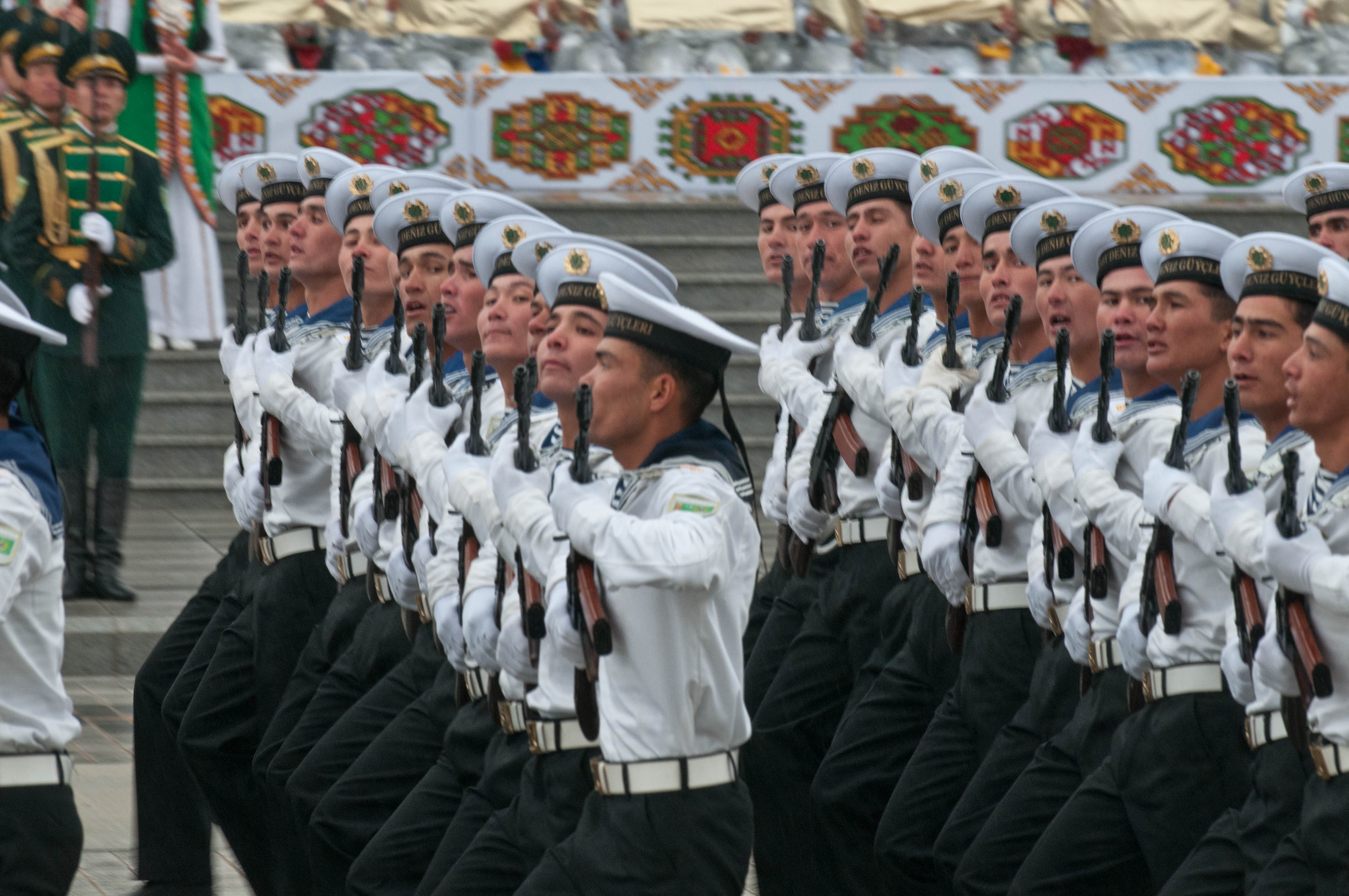
Turkmenistan navy sailors on parade

== See also ==
- Declaration recognising the Right to a Flag of States having no Sea-coast
