= List of equipment of the Hungarian Ground Forces =

This is a list of equipment in active use by the Hungarian Ground Forces.

== Infantry weapons ==
=== Firearms ===
Model	Image	Origin	Type	Calibre	Notes
Handguns
CZ P-07; CZ P-09		Czech Republic; Hungary	Semi-automatic pistol	9×19mm	Produced in Hungary under licence.
Glock 17		Austria	Semi-automatic pistol	9×19mm	Used by special forces.
Submachine guns
CZ Scorpion Evo 3		Czech Republic; Hungary	Submachine gun	9×19mm	Produced in Hungary under licence.
Heckler & Koch MP5A3		Germany	Submachine gun	9×19mm	Used by special forces.
Rifles and assault rifles
CZ Bren 2		Czech Republic; Hungary	Assault rifle	5.56×45mm NATO	Main service rifle. Produced in Hungary under licence.
M4A1		United States	Assault rifle / carabine	5.56×45mm NATO	Used by special forces.
AK-63	AKM automatkarbin, Ryssland - 7,62x39mm - Armémuseum	Hungarian People's Republic; Hungary	Assault rifle	7.62x39mm	Modernized variant of the AKM rifle. 7700 rifles have been upgraded in the 2010s and the rest of were replaced by the CZ Bren 2. Versions: AK-63D/E/MF.
Sniper rifles
CZ BREN 2 BR		Czech Republic; Hungary	Semi-automatic DMR	7.62×51mm NATO	Squad level marksman rifle.
M110		United States	Semi-automatic DMR	7.62×51mm NATO	Used by special forces.
SVD		Soviet Union	Bolt action DMR	7.62×54mmR	Will be replaced 7.62×51mm NATO caliber CZ BREN 2 BR squad level marksman rifle.
M24 SWS		United States	Bolt action sniper rifle	7.62×51mm NATO	Used by special forces.
Unique Alpine TPG-3 A4		Germany	Bolt action sniper rifle	7.62×51mm NATO	Used by special forces.
Gepárd		Hungarian People's Republic; Hungary	Anti-materiel rifle	12.7×99mm NATO	
Machine guns
M249 SAW		United States	LMG	5.56×45mm NATO	Used by special forces.
FN MAG		Belgium	GPMG	7.62×51mm NATO	Primary 7.62×51mm NATO caliber machine gun mounted on the Leopard 2A4 tanks, PZH 2000s and the Airbus helicopters.
PKM		Soviet Union	GPMG	7.62×54mmR	Will be replaced by a 7.62×51mm NATO caliber machine gun.
M2 Browning		United States	HMG	12.7×99mm NATO	Mainly used or will be used in remote controlled weapon stations of vehicles (e.g. Gidrán, Lynx, Leopard 2A7HU).
Shotguns
Remington 870 Marine		United States	Pump action shotgun	12-gauge	

=== Explosives ===
Model	Image	Origin	Type	Calibre	Notes
Anti-tank weapons
9K111 Fagot		Soviet Union	ATGM	120mm	
9M113 Konkurs		Soviet Union	ATGM	135mm	
9K115-2 Metis-M		Russia	ATGM	130mm	Unknown number delivered by Russia between 1996 and 1997.
Spike LR2		Israel	ATGM	152mm	On order for the Lynx armoured fighting vehicle and for the infantry platoons as well. The long range Spike ER2 will be integrated to the Airbus H145M helicopters.
Carl Gustaf M4		Sweden	Recoilless rifle	84×246mmR	Last batch delivered December 2024.
RGW 110		Germany	Rocket launcher	110mm	Ordered in large numbers and they are to be delivered around 2025.
Grenades and grenade launchers
H&K M320		Germany; United States	Under-barrel grenade launcher	40×46mm LV	Used by special forces.
Mk 19 Mod 3		United States	AGL	40×53mm HV	Used by special forces.

== Artillery ==
Model	Image	Origin	Variant	Quantity in active service	Notes
Mortars
EXPAL M-08 Combi	EXPAL M-08 Combi 60 mm	Spain	60mm mortar	96	
82-BM-37	Saratov Military Glory Museum - 82-BM-37	Soviet Union	82mm mortar	~ 50	
Hirtenberger M12		Austria	120mm mortar	N/A	A "low double-digit number" of systems was delivered February 2024.
Artillery
D-20		Soviet Union		12	283 in reserve.
PzH 2000		Germany		24	The deliveries have been completed.
Multiple rocket launchers
HIMARS Multiple rocket launcher system		United States	Multiple rocket launcher system	(24 on order)	In February 2022 Hungary showed its interest to buy new M142 HIMARS multiple launch rocket system from the United States. The potential sale was blocked by Jim Risch, a high-ranking member of the United States Senate Foreign Relations Committee due to Hungary's opposition to Sweden's NATO membership. On April 8, 2026, Vice President JD Vance during a visit in Hungary signed a contract for Hungary to procure HIMARS systems worth $700 million.

== Anti-air ==
Model	Image	Origin	Variant	Quantity in active service	Notes
Anti-aircraft guns
Skyranger 30		Switzerland; Germany		1 prototype for testing, more to be ordered later	Hungary has ordered Lynx-based Skyranger 30 systems equipped with a 30 millimeter gun and Mistral Missiles.
Surface-to-air-missile systems
2K12 Kub		Soviet Union; Hungary; Poland		12 (32 in reserve)	Modernized in cooperation with Poland.
Mistral		France		45 Mistral Atlas twin-launchers + 9 MCPs	Both Mistral 2 and Mistral 3 missiles are in use, MCPs have been upgraded as well.
NASAMS		Norway; United States		2 systems delivered, 4+1 systems on order	Kongsberg Defence Systems and Raytheon Technologies were awarded a 410 million euro contract to deliver the NASAMS system to the Hungarian Defence forces.

== Vehicles ==
Model	Image	Origin	Variant	Quantity in active service	Notes
Main battle tanks
Leopard 2		Germany West Germany	Leopard 2A7+ Leopard 2A4	44 12	Last Leopard 2A7+ delivered on 12th December 2025 and 12 Leopard 2A4 tanks delivered in advance for training purposes.
T-72		Soviet Union	T-72M1	34 (164 total)	130 tanks in reserve. Will be replaced by the Leopard 2A7+ in the 2020s.
Armoured fighting vehicles
Lynx		Germany; Hungary	KF41	46/218	On August 16, 2020, the Government of Hungary and Rheinmetall Group have signed a contract to start manufacturing of Lynx infantry fighting vehicle family in Hungary. Approximately 50 units will be manufactured per year. Estimated to reach full operational capability in the Hungarian Defence Forces by 2026–2027. The following versions will be produced: Infantry fighting vehicle (base model), mortar carrier (120 mm), ambulance and mobile command post (C2/C3). The 209 pieces of Lynx will be protected by the Rheinmetall's StrikeShield Active Protection System. A government document published in June 2021 talks about 256 Lynx infantry fighting vehicles being ordered. It also mentions the development and production of an air-defence variant using the Lynx chassis.
BTR-80		Soviet Union Hungary	BTR-80A BTR-80 BTR-80 SKJ BTR-80 VSF BTR-80 MVJ BTR-80 MPAEJ BTR-80 MPFJ	120 260 12 4 Unknown Unknown Unknown	555 units received from Russia between 1996 and 1999. Modernized Hungarian-upgraded BTR-80s for technical rescue, medical rescue and NBC missions. Total number of vehicles add up to 600.
Ejder Yalcin Gidrán		Turkey Hungary		200	40 Ejder Yalcin vehicles bought from Turkey's Nurol Makina, the rest to be manufactured in Hungary under license under the name Gidrán. Total of 400+ planned for multiple purposes. Some will be equipped with 120mm mortars.
NMS 4x4		Turkey; Hungary			
M1151 HMMWV		United States		90+	Most of them used by the Hungarian special forces.
Oshkosh M-ATV		United States		20	Used by the Hungarian special forces in Afghanistan.
Cougar		United States		13	Used by the Hungarian special forces in Afghanistan.
International MaxxPro		United States		~42	Bought second-hand.
All-terrain vehicles
Polaris RZR		United States		12+2	Used by the Hungarian special forces.
Military engineering vehicles
PTS		Soviet Union	PTS-2	50+	Some in reserve. Very large tracked amphibious vehicle used for crossing water bodies and building bridges across rivers.
PMP		Soviet Union		3	3 active sets. Each set consists of 32 river element, 4 bank element, 2 track element, 12 bridging boat and 38 KrAZ-255. The maximal length of bridge made from one set is 227 metres.
TMM		Soviet Union	TMM-3	4	
BAT-2		Soviet Union	BAT-2	2	
VT-55		Soviet Union	VT-55	2	
VT-72B		Czechoslovakia		2	
MT-55A		Czechoslovakia		2	
BLG-60M		East Germany	BLG-60M2		
Leguan		Germany		2 delivered	12 on order. The new Leguans are going to replace the BLG-60M armoured bridgelayers which will be transferred to the 37th Engineer Regiment.
WISENT 2		Germany		5	2 on order.
Büffel (BPz 3)		Germany		At least 2 delivered	9 vehicles were ordered in September 2020 as part of the establishment of the joint Lynx manufacturing plant in Hungary. Deliveries are scheduled for 2023.
TeleMAX		Germany		3	
ANDROS F6-A		United States		3	
Utility vehicles and trucks
Rába		Hungary	H14 H18 H25	300 20 Unknown	The new H-14 series, can be armoured within 48 hours. The armour defends soldiers from bullets, splinters and IEDs. Production of Rába H-14, H-18, and H-25 trucks commenced in 2004, these initially locally designed chassis fitted with MAN engines, associated components including cooling system and the MAN modular military cab. Current production is CKD using some locally sourced components such as axles. About 300 examples were built using components supplied between 2004 and 2006, with a further 150 assembled from CKD kits delivered from 2007.
RMMV HX range of tactical trucks		Austria; Germany	HX77	63	Will also receive up to 150 RMMV HX77 8x8 trucks, with 63 delivered since 2007.
Mercedes-Banz Unimog		Germany		88	
Mercedes-Benz G-Class		Germany	G-270 G-280	223	Standard utility vehicle.
Mercedes-Benz Sprinter		Germany	Van Ambulance	12 7	
Iveco Scorpio		Italy	CASEVAC	2	All-terrain Iveco Daily in an ambulance configuration, 11 to be delivered by 2029.
Ikarus		Hungarian People's Republic	E95 Aries	15 138	100 Currus-Volvo Aries delivered to replace Ikarus 250, 256, 280.
Suzuki Vitara		Japan; Hungary		550	Standard staff car.
Škoda Octavia		Czech Republic		Unknown	Used by military police.
Toyota Hilux		Japan		90	16 used by military police, and another 6 will be used by the military cartography teams.
New Holland T5 series		United States	T5 110	10	Ten high-performance, modern New Holland T5.110 tractors and their accessories were purchased under the Defense and Armed Forces Development Program. They will be used around military airports, training and shooting ranges.
Volkswagen Transporter		Germany	T6 Van T6 Pickup truck	80 10	
Volkswagen Crafter		Germany		70	

== Unmanned Aerial Vehicles ==
Model	Image	Origin	Variant	Quantity in active service	Notes
Unmanned aerial vehicles
Skylark		Israel		12	9 Skylark I and 3 Skylark III

== River fleet ==
Model	Image	Origin	Type	Quantity in active service	Notes
AN 2		Hungarian People's Republic	Minesweeper	5	(?) in reserve.
Neštin-class		Yugoslavia	Minesweeper	2	6 minesweepers were acquired from Yugoslavia in 1981. As of 2023 2 of them are in active service and the other 3 were sold. And the last one was scrapped.
Zodiac Pro 850		United States	Multiple role	2	2 8.50 meters center console boat with room for 10 people were received in 2020.
Special Operations Craft – Riverine		United States	Special operations craft	2	Riverine craft perform short-range insertion and extraction of special operations forces in river and near-shore environments. United States provides 3 boats under the Excess Defense Articles program in 2021. with one more received, but the boat was not put into service.

== Possible future purchases ==
Model	Image	Origin	Type	Variant	Quantity planned	Notes
Infantry Weapons
New family of small arms developed in Hungary		Hungary	Handguns, submachine guns, assault rifles and light machine guns	G9HSP, G9SMG, G224AR, G224LMG, G308BR	Unknown	In 2019, Gestamen R&D Zrt. was asked to create a family of small arms developed entirely in Hungary. Several examples of the weapons are currently undergoing team trials.
Unmanned ground vehicles
Mission Master	Mission Master UGV	United Kingdom; Germany / Hungary	Unmanned ground vehicle	Rheinmetall Mission Master XT	Unknown	In 2020 Hungary showed its interest to develop and manufacture the tablet-controlled Mission Master XT from Rheinmetall. Each Mission Masters will be built in Kaposvár, Hungary.
Tank
Panther KF51		Germany; Hungary	Main battle tank	Unknown	Unknown (possibly around 40-50 units)	Joint development
Artillery
Rheinmetall HX3 based 155mm L/60 SPG		Germany; Austria	Self-propelled artillery	Unknown		
Unmanned aerial vehicles
MP-H		Hungary	Light unmanned aerial vehicle		Unknown	In 2014 Hungary started to develop its own light unmanned aerial vehicle for military purposes. A specific version of the drone is able to carry a pair of air-to-ground missiles.
Elbit Hermes 900		Israel	Unmanned aerial vehicle		Unknown	In 2021 Hungary showed its interest to buy new drones from Israel.
Vestel Karayel		Turkey	Unmanned combat aerial vehicle		Unknown	
Baykar Bayraktar TB2		Turkey	Unmanned combat aerial vehicle		Unknown	In 2021 Hungary showed its interest to buy drones from Turkey.
WB Electronic drones		Poland	Unmanned aerial vehicle/Loitering munitions	FlyEye, Ft-5, Warmate	Unknown	
Satellites
Multi-purpose satellite		Hungary	Communications satellite	CarpathiaSat	1	Hungary started to develop its own multi-purpose satellite that will be launched into space in 2024. Hungarian company 4iG Space and Defense Technologies has signed with Northrop Grumman to develop the nation’s first communications satellite under a deal announced on April 8, 2026. The HUSAT Hungarian satellite program, announced in 2024, will consist of an eight satellite Earth Observation (EO) constellation built by 4iG Space and Defense Technologies.
