= Neštin-class minesweeper =

River minesweeper

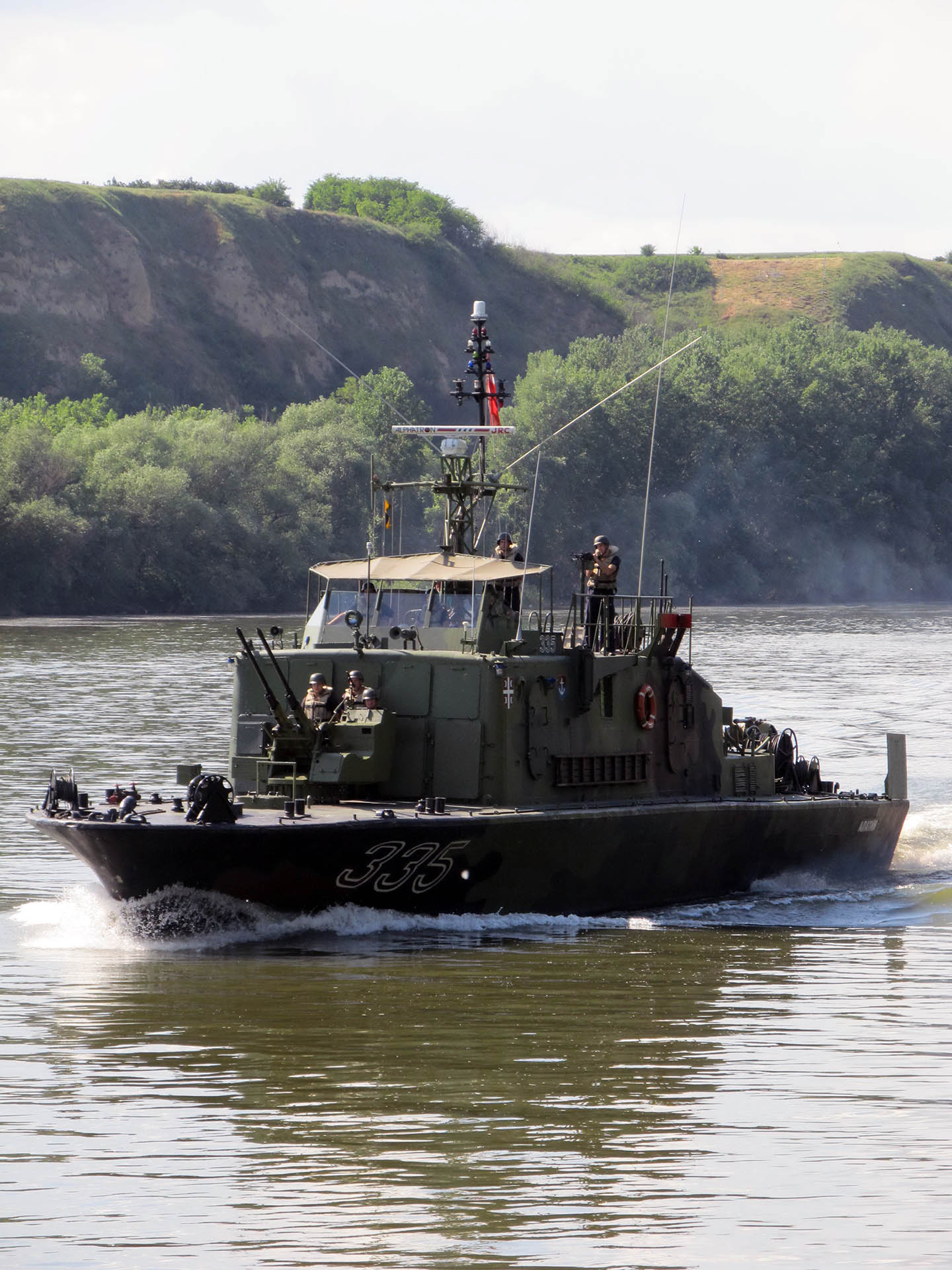
- RML-335 "Apatin" of the Serbian River Flotilla

Class overview
- Builders: "Brodotehnika shipyard", Belgrade
- Operators: (Serbia) Serbian River Flotilla; (Hungary) Hungarian Defence Force; Yugoslav Navy; (Iraq) Iraqi Navy
- Preceded by: 301-class river minesweeper
- Built: 1976-1980
- Completed: 16
- Active: 7

General characteristics
- Displacement: 61 tons
- Length: 26.94 m (88.4 ft)
- Height: 2.68 m (8.8 ft)
- Draft: 1.08 m (3.5 ft)
- Speed: 18 kilometres per hour (9.7 kn) upstream; 24 kilometres per hour (13.0 kn)downstream
- Complement: 17 officers and men
- Armament: 1 × M75 20mm gun (2 on RML-341); 2 × M71 20mm gun; 1 × launcher Strela 2; 18 non-contact mines type AIM-M82 or 24 anchor R-1

The Neštin-class minesweeper is a class of minesweeper built specifically for naval mine clearing duties on rivers. The class was built for the needs of the Yugoslav Navy on the Danube river, and was also sold to Hungary and Iraq during the 1970s and '80s.

== Design ==
A new river minesweeper design was requested in the 1970s to replace the 301-class minesweeper in the Yugoslav Navy. The Neštin-class was designed by the Naval Institute of the Yugoslav Navy. All minesweepers were built by "Brodotehnika shipyard" in Belgrade. They can load and lay 18 non-contact mines type AIM-M82 or 24 anchor R-1 mines, as well as 80 fully equipped troops.

Equipment for countermeasures consist of mechanical mine-hunter MDL-2R, makeshift electromagnetic/acoustic mine hunter PEAM-1 and explosive mine hunter AEL.

The Neštin-class is powered by two Torpedo B-539RM/2 engines 121 kW each.

== Operators ==
Fifteen ships were built for the Yugoslav Navy and export customers from 1976 to 1980. One ship was built for the Navy of Serbia and Montenegro in 1999.

=== Serbia and Yugoslavia ===
Six ships were built for the Yugoslav Navy in the 1970s while an additional ship (RML-341 "Novi Sad") with heavier artillery was built in 1999. Four Neštin-class minesweepers continued their service with the Serbian River Flotilla, following the dissolution of Yugoslavia, in the role of universal vessels for the control of river ways.

Serbian and former Yugoslav Neštin-class minesweepers:

- RML-331 "Neštin" (retired)
- RML-332 "Titel"
- RML-333 "Belegiš" (retired)
- RML-334 "Bosut" (retired)
- RML-335 "Apatin"
- RML-336 "Smederevo"
- RML-341 "Novi Sad"

=== Hungary ===
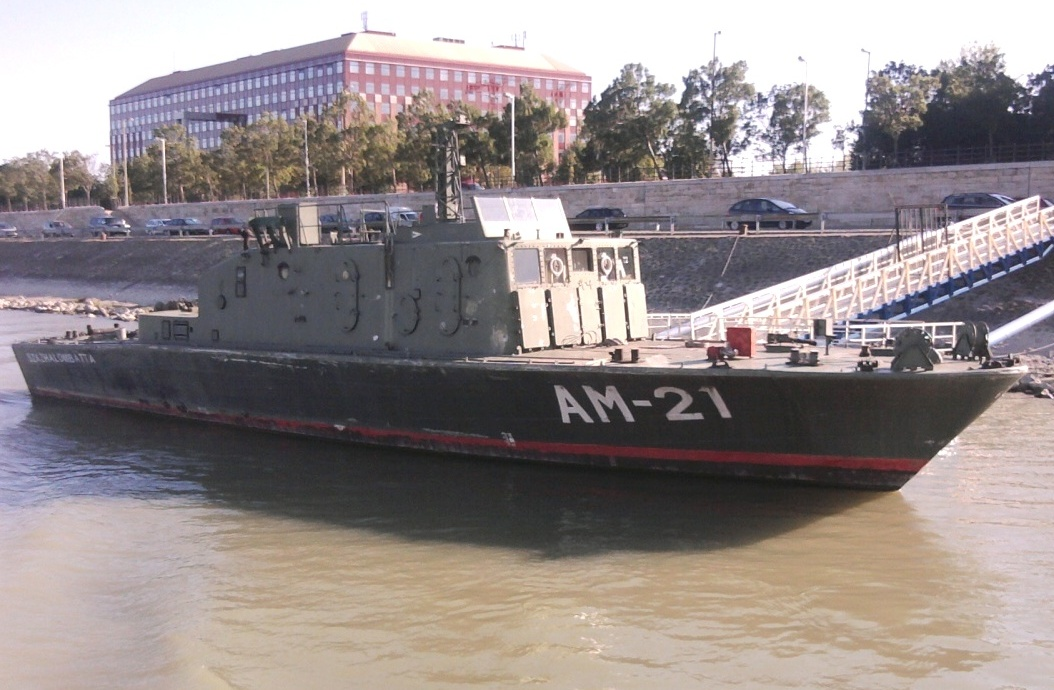
Retired AM-21 Százhalombatta minesweeper of the Hungarian Defence Forces

The Hungarian Danube Flotilla received six Neštin-class minesweepers in 1981 from Yugoslavia. In Hungarian service, they were designated as MS-25. Today three, "Óbuda", "Dunaújváros", and "Dunaföldvár", are still operated by HDF 1st EOD & River Flotilla Battalion.

Hungarian MS-25 minesweepers:

- AM-11 "Újpest" (retired)
- AM-12 "Baja" (retired)
- AM-21 "Százhalombatta" (retired)
- AM-22 "Óbuda"
- AM-31 "Dunaújváros"
- AM-32 "Dunaföldvár"

=== Iraq ===
Yugoslavia delivered three Neštin-class minesweepers to Iraq in 1980. All survived both the Iran-Iraq War and Operation Desert Storm, although they were largely inactive after 1991. Two were sunk during the 2003 invasion of Iraq and the third was captured in a damaged state by British soldiers and scrapped.

As of 2004, the class was no longer in service with the Iraqi Navy.
