= Landing Craft Infantry =

Type of landing craft used by the Allies during World War II

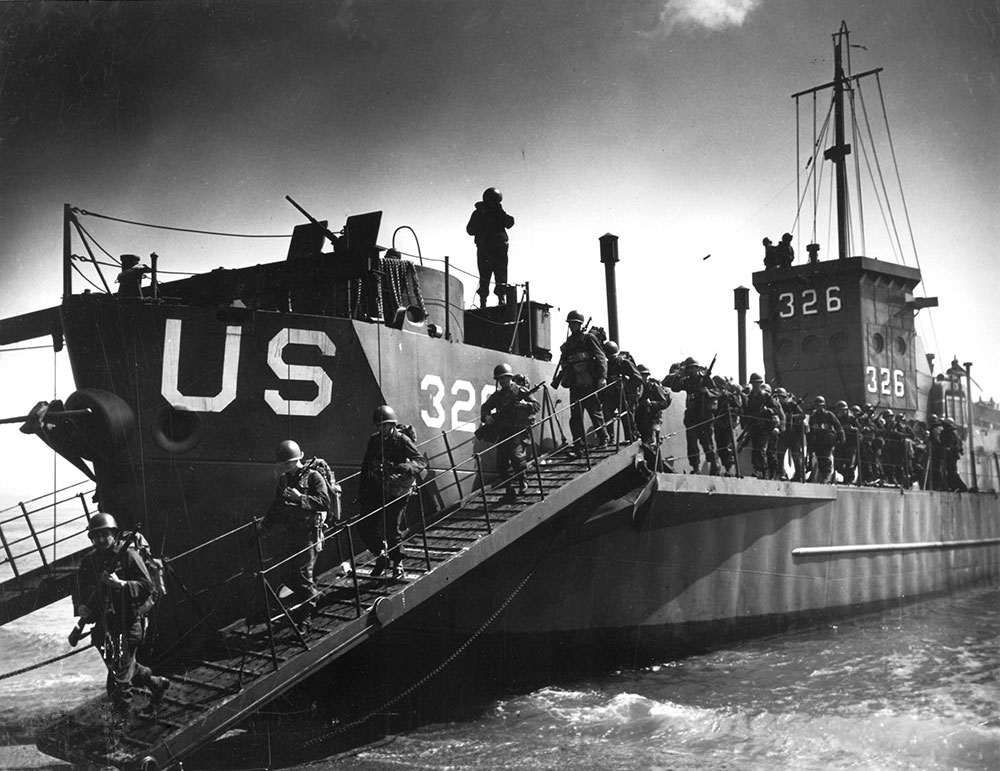
- USS LCI(L)-326 during training for D-Day

Class overview
- Builders: Albina Engine Works; Bethlehem Hingham Shipyard; Brown Shipbuilding; Commercial Iron Works; Consolidated Steel Corporation; Defoe Shipbuilding Company; Federal Shipbuilding and Drydock Company; George Lawley & Sons; New Jersey Shipbuilding; New York Shipbuilding
- Operators: United States Navy; Royal Navy; Royal Canadian Navy; Soviet Navy; Republic of China Navy
- In commission: 1943–1946
- Completed: 923
- Preserved: LCI(L)-713 and LCI(L)-1091

General characteristics – LCI(L)
- Type: Landing craft
- Displacement: 234 long tons (238 t) standard; 389 long tons (395 t) full
- Length: 158 ft 6 in (48.31 m)
- Beam: 23 ft 3 in (7.09 m)
- Draft: 5 ft 4 in (1.63 m); 5 ft 11 in (1.80 m) aft
- Propulsion: 2 banks Detroit diesel 6051 quad-71, 2 shafts (4 engines per shaft), 1,600 bhp (1,193 kW)
- Speed: 16 knots (30 km/h; 18 mph)
- Range: 500 nmi (900 km) at 15 knots. 4,000 nmi (7,400 km) at 12 kn (22 km/h) carrying extra fuel in place of troops and cargo.
- Troops: 180, later 210
- Complement: 3 officers and 21 enlisted men
- Armament: 4 × Oerlikon 20 mm cannon (one forward, one amidships, two aft)
- Armor: 2 in Plastic armour splinter protection for gunners, pilot house

The Landing Craft Infantry (LCI) were several classes of landing craft used by the Allies to land large numbers of infantry directly onto beaches during World War II. They were developed in response to a British request for seagoing amphibious assault ships capable of carrying and landing substantially more troops than their smaller assault landing craft (LCA). The result was a small steel ship that could land 200 men, traveling from rear bases on its own bottom at a speed of up to 15 knots.

Some 923 were built starting in 1943, serving in both the Pacific and European theaters, including a number that were converted into heavily armed beach assault support ships. The LCI(L) supplemented the small LCAs/LCVPs as a way to get many troops ashore before a dock could be captured or built. As such, they were the largest dedicated beachable infantry landing craft (the larger infantry landing ship (LSI) was a transporter for men and small craft such as the British LCA) in the Allied inventory.

== Development ==
The LCI(L) was designed to carry 200 men at up to 15 knots and be as capable at landing as the LCA. Since a steel hull would be needed and steel was already earmarked for building destroyers at home, the US was approached. There, the plans were developed into the LCI(L), landing craft, infantry (large).

The original British design was envisioned as being a "one time use" vessel which would simply ferry the troops across the English Channel. As such, no sleeping accommodations were placed in the original design. The infantry were provided benches (similar to those on a ferry) upon which to sit while they were transported across the channel. This was changed shortly after initial use of these ships, when it was discovered that many missions would require overnight accommodations.

The U.S. was able to come up with an easily-built and mass-produced design by using non-traditional shipbuilding facilities and equipment. The U.S. established LCI building yards at ten different locations.

== Construction ==
There were 3 major types of LCI(L) which differed mostly by the location of the ramps and by the shape of the conning tower. All of these ships had similar hulls. The hull of all LCI(L) were 158 ft (48 m) long with a 23-foot beam, making them relatively long and narrow.

The 3 major LCI(L) types are normally referred to as: a) Square Conning tower, Side Ramp (the original style); b) Round Conn, Side Ramp; and c) Round Conn, Bow Ramp.

On LCI(L)1-349 class, (Square Conn, Side Ramps) the deck was wider than the prow and two gangways on either side of the bow led onto a pair of ramps that were lowered, and down which troops would disembark. The LCI 350 class had a single enclosed bow ramp with two bow doors that swung open. The reason for moving the ramp to the inside was to provide some protection for the troops as they disembarked to the beach, if only by concealing them from enemy sight. Also, the low, squared-off conning tower was upgraded on later models (LCI(L)350 and higher) with a taller, round conning tower which afforded slightly more visibility from the bridge.

The steepness and narrowness of either type of bow ramps made the LCI impractical for landing troops as part of an initial assault against a defended beach, and they were sometimes reserved for the follow-up waves, after the LCA or LCPL boats had landed. However, they were included in the first waves at numerous invasions such as Anzio, Normandy, Southern France, Elba, Saipan, the Philippines, Iwo Jima, Guam, and Okinawa.

=== Propulsion ===
All LCI(L) were twin shaft propelled by two banks of Detroit Diesel 6-71 "Quad" Diesel engines that produced a total of 1600 bhp. These engines were a wartime expedient design that utilized existing and readily available engines. Four 2-stroke Detroit Diesel 6-71 (inline 6 cylinder with 71 cubic inch displacement per cylinder) with Roots blower were coupled to create a bank for each of the two propeller shafts. The four engines per bank were joined using individual drive clutches, hence the name "Quad Diesel". If a single engine were to fail, the broken engine could be disconnected from the unit via its clutch and repaired while the other three engines were still operating. General Motors Corporation Electro-Motive Division supplied the reduction gears, propellers, drive shafts and control units. Each of the two propellers was a reversible pitch propeller, which allowed the propeller shaft to spin only in one direction for either ahead or astern operation. This, coupled with the use of a stern anchor which was dropped as the ship approached the beach, was used to pull the ship off the beach after the infantry had disembarked. Two auxiliary Detroit Diesel 2-71s drove the two 30 kW 120 V D.C. Ship's Service Generators.

=== Armament ===
LCI(L) were armed originally with four or five Oerlikon 20 mm cannons. Each gun was mounted inside of a round gun tub with an integral splinter shield. As the war progressed, several LCI(L) had three of their forward mounted 20mm Oerlikon cannons removed and replaced with heavier single barrel Bofors 40 mm guns and were designated LCI(G) (LCI Gunboats). Several LCI(L) had various types of Rocket Launcher racks added in place of their side ramps and inside their well decks and were sometimes designated LCI(R). LCI(L) modified to carry three M2 4.2-inch mortars were designated LCI(M).

== Service history ==
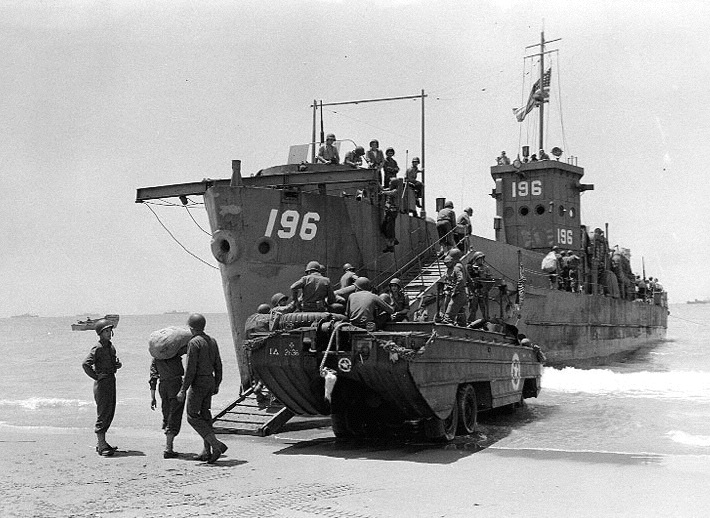
Troops embarking on USS LCI(L)-196 from a DUKW, near Scoglitti, Sicily, on 11 July 1943.

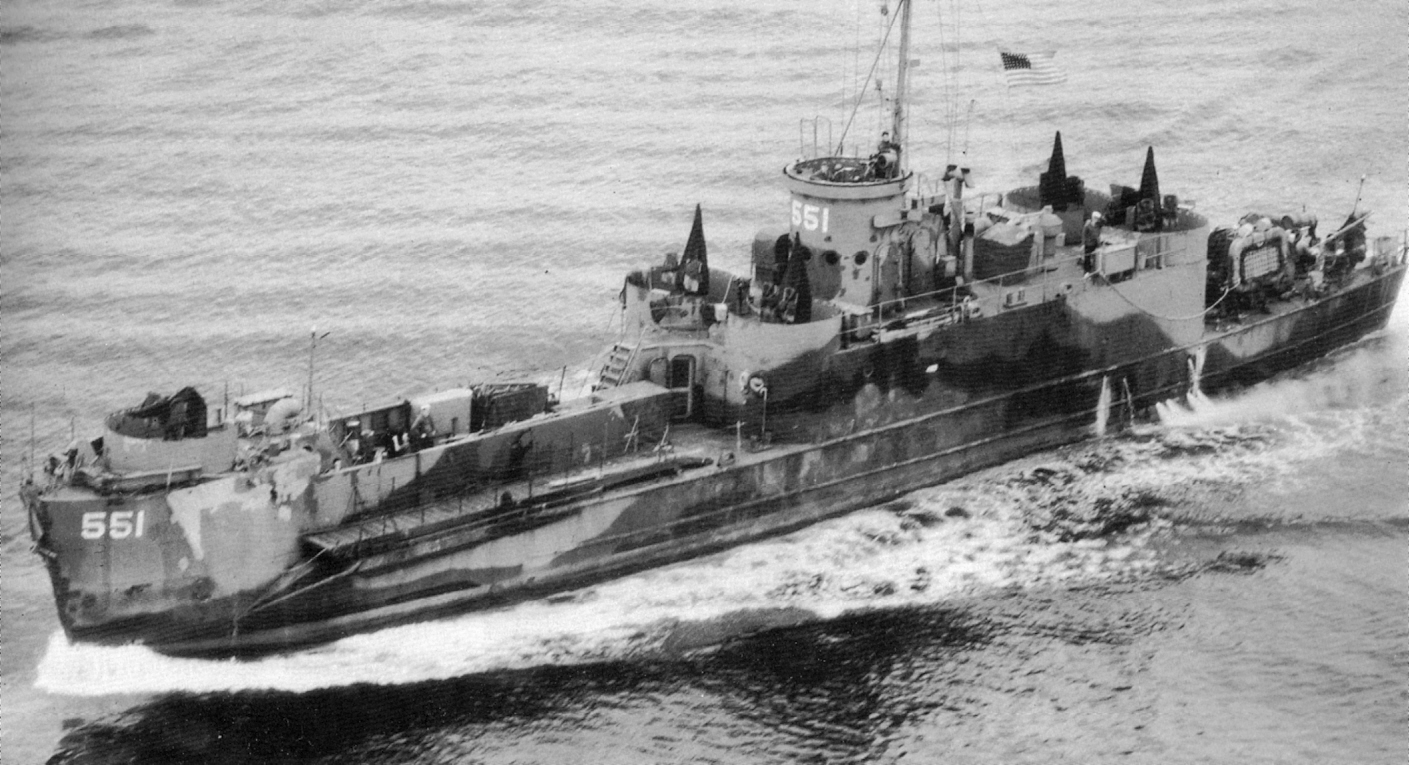
The U.S. Navy large infantry landing craft USS LCI(L)-551 in May 1945, flying her colors at half-mast in honor of the recently deceased President Franklin D. Roosevelt. Transferred to the Soviet Navy on 29 July 1945 during Project Hula, she became DS-48 and took part in the Soviet invasion of the Kuril Islands. The Soviet Union returned her to the United States in 1955.

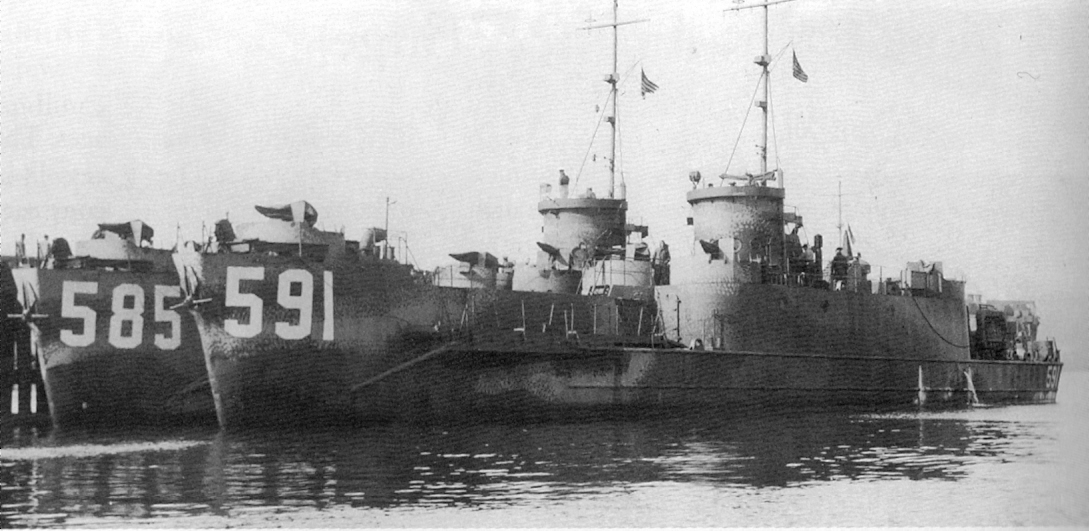
The LCIs USS LCI(L)-585 and USS LCI(L)-591 at Cold Bay, Territory of Alaska, in the spring of 1945, awaiting transfer during Project Hula to the Soviet Navy, in which they became DS-45 and DS-35, respectively. The Soviets returned LCI(L)-585 to the United States in 1955; DS-35 was scrapped in the Soviet Union.

The first LCI(L)s entered service in 1943 chiefly with the Royal Navy (RN) and United States Navy. Early models were capable of carrying 180 troops; this was increased to 210 later. Craft in service with the two navies had some variation according to national preferences. Some 923 LCI were built in ten American shipyards and 211 provided under lend-lease to the Royal Navy. In Royal Navy service they were known as "HM LCI(L)-(pennant number)". During Project Hula, the United States in June and July 1945 secretly transferred 30 LCI(L)s to the Soviet Navy, which designated the type as desantiye suda ("landing ship") or DS; they saw action against the Japanese after the Soviet Union entered the war against Japan in August 1945, and five – DS-1 (ex-USS LCI(L)-672), DS-5 (ex-USS LCI(L)-525), DS-9 (ex-USS LCI(L)-554), DS-43 (ex-USS LCI(L)-943), and DS-47 (ex-USS LCI(L)-671) – out of 16 involved were lost on 18 August 1945 during the landings on Shumshu. The Soviet Union eventually returned 15 of the surviving LCI(L)s to the United States, all in 1955.

The LCI fleet was used for numerous missions. One important use was for smoke laying to obscure the invading fleet from enemy artillery or aircraft. Still others were used to provide close-in gunfire support to the troops who had just landed on the beach. In one such episode, eight LCI(G) were used two days prior to the invasion of Iwo Jima to protect Underwater Demolition Team insertion and beach mapping teams. They were mistaken by the Japanese defenders as the main invasion, and were fired upon by numerous previously hidden large caliber coastal defense artillery (up to 8 inch). Three LCI(G) were sunk and the rest were damaged. Lt.(j.g) Rufus G. Herring (CO LCI Force) received the Medal of Honor for this action.

In another instance, Lt. Alec Guinness RNVR made numerous trips as the Commanding Officer of HMS LCI(L)-124 delivering troops to the beach near Cape Passero lighthouse on 9 July 1943 during the Allied invasion of Sicily. He missed the call from his commander to delay the landing and went on to land 25 minutes ahead of the rest of the LCI Flotilla. As he was returning from the beach empty, he was rebuked by his Flotilla Commander, who thought he was deserting from the fight, when he informed the Commander he was on his way back to get more troops after having already landed once.

Most LCI(L)s were struck from service by both the Royal Navy and the U.S. Navy in 1946, and were put into reserve, sold, scrapped, or used as target ships. In addition to the 30 LCI(L)s transferred to the Soviet Union in Project Hula, the United States also transferred LCI(L)s to Argentina (15), the Republic of China (13), France (14), Indonesia (7), Chile (6), the Dominican Republic (3), the Philippines (3), Israel (2), Thailand (2), and the Republic of Korea (1).

In February 1949, the U.S. reclassified the remaining LCIs as "Landing Ship Infantry" (LSI). Landing Ship Infantry was a term that had been used during the war since around 1941 by the British for various vessels such as converted ferries and passenger ships that could carry 800–1,800 troops close to shore, the final transfer being by smaller boats.

== Variants ==
As with the Landing craft tank, the LCI(L) was used as the basis of a number of conversions into specialist vessels.

=== LC(FF) – flotilla flagship ===
Equipped to carry a flotilla commander and his staff. Forty-nine were converted, but after their combat debut at Okinawa they were judged to be too cramped and slow for this role. Landing Ship Mediums were then recommended for conversion, but this never happened.

=== LCI(G) – gunboat ===
Two or sometimes three 40 mm guns, six .50-caliber (12.7mm) machine guns and ten Mk.7 rocket launchers were added to the existing armament to provide close-in fire support for landings. This variant was used for the basis of the LCS(L) class of Landing Craft Support ships. The same hull was used and more armament was added, but the troop carrying capability was removed.

=== LCI(M) – mortar ===
Equipped with three M2 4.2 inch mortars for naval surface fire support.

=== LCI(R) – rocket ===
A platform for six 5-inch rocket launchers. This platform was rather unsophisticated as the rocket launchers were fixed to the deck, and so the ship had to be maneuvered to aim them. When fired the crew had to take shelter below decks to escape the blast of the rocket engines.

=== Other ===
At least four LCIs were used to support underwater demolition teams, and were unofficially termed LCI(D)s. Others were equipped with searchlights for spotting Japanese night attacks.

Thirty-two LCIs were converted to ACMU-7 class coastal minesweepers.

One LCI(L), LCI-346, was used as a press boat (PGY) during the Battle of Iwo Jima, collecting reporters' copy from several ships for delivery to a communications ship for transmission.

Admiral William Halsey Jr. reported that the LCI(L) was ideally suited to move large numbers of sailors from ships in fleet anchorages to liberty ashore and back. BuShips studied conversions for these roles but none were performed.

== Fairmile Type H landing craft ==
=== LCI(S) ===
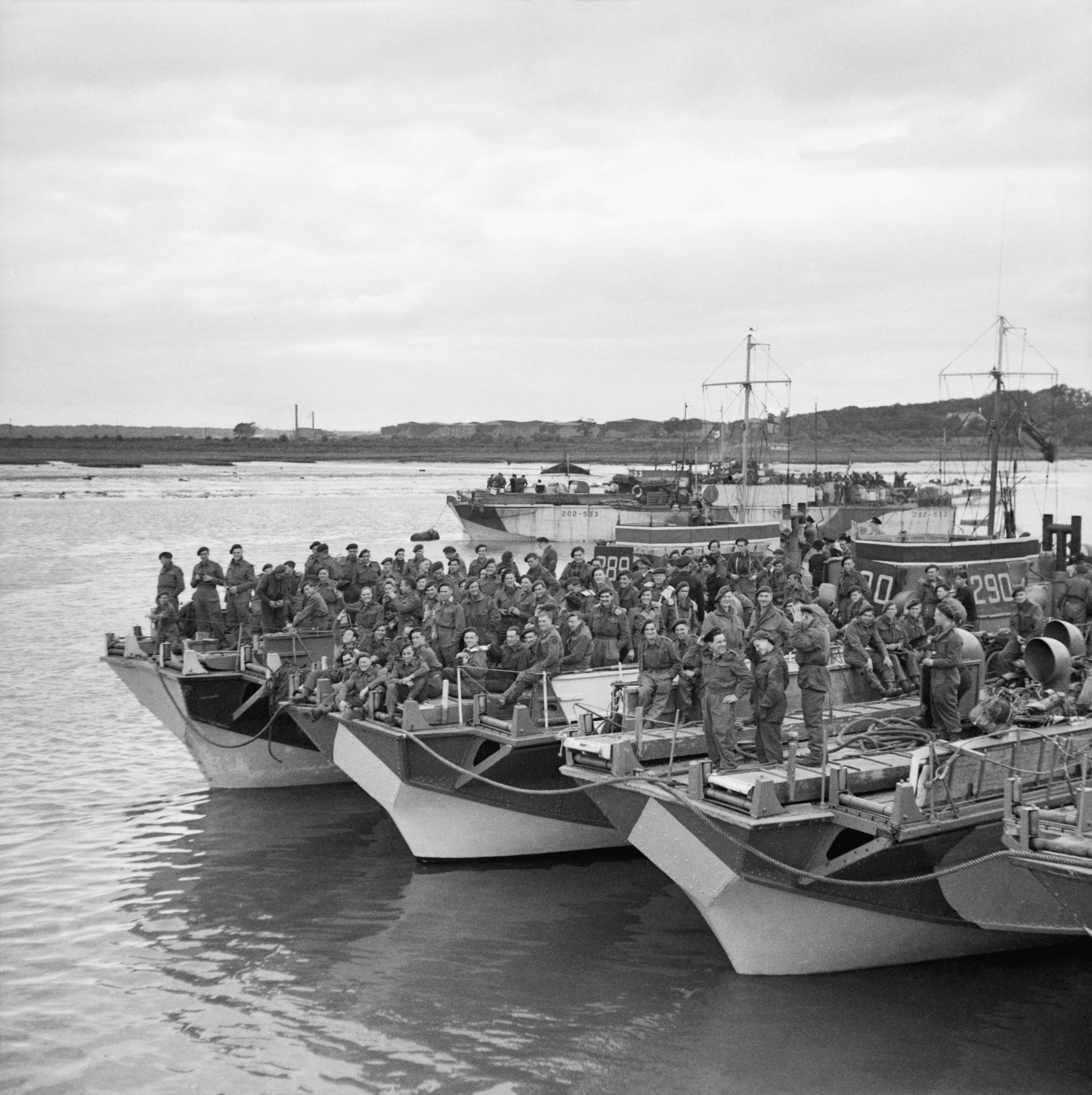
LCI(S)s moored at Southampton in the final preparations for D-Day

At the same time as the LCI(L) was handed over for US development and production, the British reworked their need for a raiding vessel into something that could be produced natively without making demands on limited resources. Fairmile Marine had already designed a number of small military vessels that were built in wood and they produced the Fairmile Type H which was another prefabricated wooden design. This was taken on as the Landing Craft Infantry (Small) or LCI(S).

The overall length of these craft was 105 feet 1 inch (32.03 m) with a beam of 21 feet 5 inches (6.53 m). They were one of the faster landing craft, with a maximum speed of 12.5 knots (14.4 mph). They had a crew of 2 officers and 15 other ranks and could carry 102 troops for landing. Their petrol engines and the decision not to use self-sealing fuel tanks, together with the use of armour only in limited places made them less safe under fire than diesel fuelled vessels with more armour protection. Consequently, they were more suited to commando raids rather than large opposed landings. For instance, only 39 were used in the initial assault on D-Day. In action, the troops were disembarked over ramps which were extended either side of the bow. These were susceptible to damage.

One Fairmile "H", a veteran of D-Day and the assault on Walcheren, survives as a houseboat on the River Adur, Shoreham-b-Sea, West Sussex, England.

=== LCS(L) ===
The Landing Craft Support (Large) ("LCS(L) Mark 1" or "LCS(L) Mark 2") was based on the LCI(S) hull, and were built by the United Kingdom, intended for use as a support vessel providing additional firepower. The Mk.1 carried a tank turret complete with its QF 2 pounder gun (40 mm), but for the Mk.2 this was replaced with a turret mounting the QF 6 pounder gun (57 mm). To this was added two Oerlikon 20 mm cannon and two 0.5 inch Vickers machine guns. Ten were built in all.

== LCS(L) Mk.3/LSSL ==
The Landing Craft Support (Large) or "LCS(L) Mark 3" was built by the United States. These ships were built on a standard LCI hull, but were modified to add gunfire support equipment and accommodation. They were typically armed with a single 3"/50 caliber gun, two twin 40 mm cannon, and several 20 mm cannon. These ships were prevalent in most major Pacific Theater invasions beginning in late 1944. The type was reclassified as Landing Ship Support, Large (LSSL) in 1949. One hundred and thirty of this type were built.

== Surviving LCIs ==
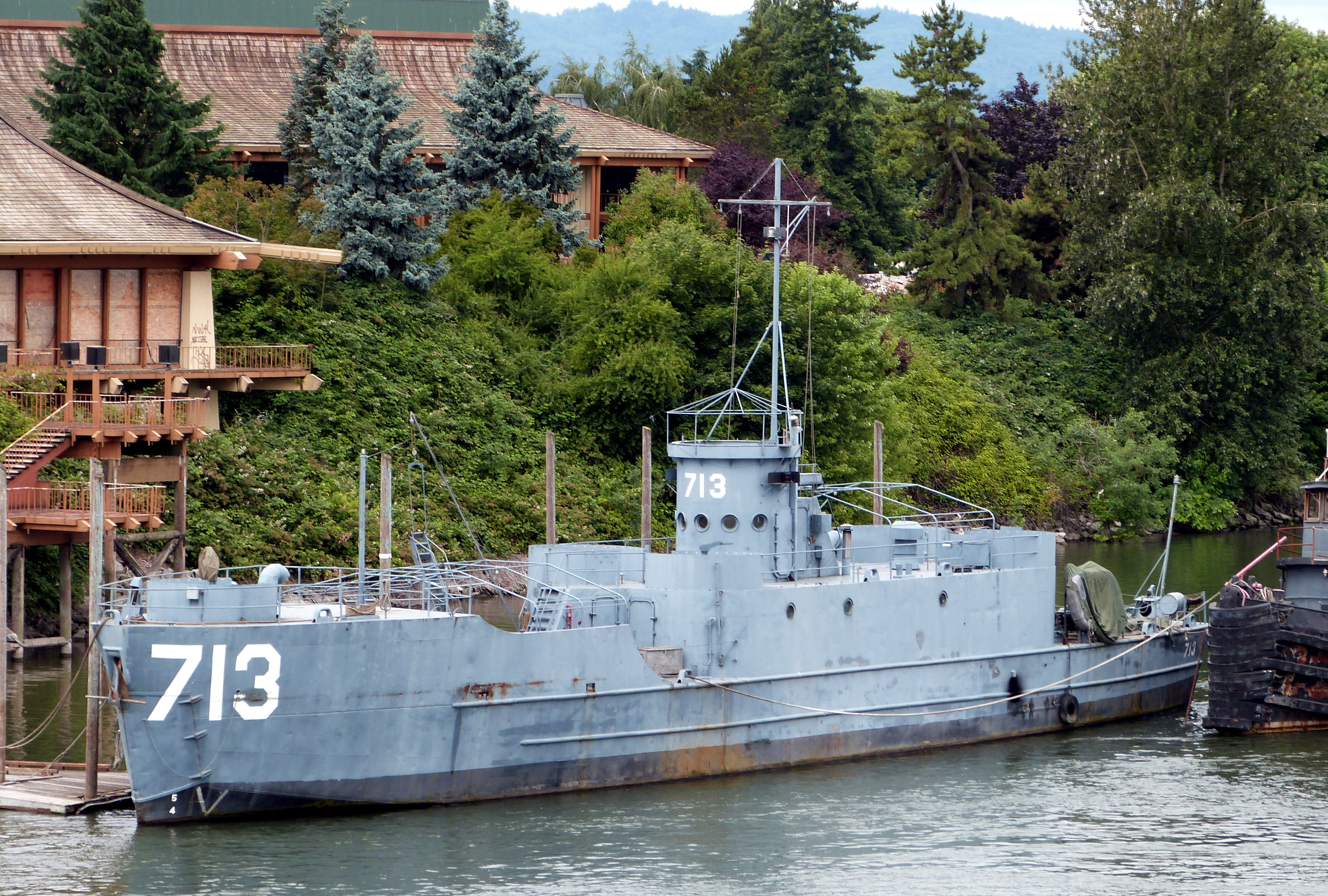
The partially restored USS LCI(L)-713 in Portland, Oregon, 2012

Several LCIs survive and are available to be seen by the public.

The LCI(L)-713, (a round conn, bow ramp) is located in Portland, Oregon near the I-5 Bridge over the Columbia River. It is currently owned and being restored by a non-profit 501c3 group, the "Amphibious Forces Memorial Museum". Built in 1944 in Neponset, Massachusetts, the ship was transferred to the Pacific Theater where it saw action in making two assault landings: Zamboanga, Philippines in March 1945 and Brunei Bay, Borneo in June 1945 (as part of the Battle of North Borneo). Purchased as war surplus initially for use as a log hauling tugboat, the engines were removed and it was relegated to a floating storage hulk in Stevenson WA until the late 1950s when it was abandoned and sank into the river mud on the shore of the Columbia river. In the late 1970s the ship was refloated and restoration began on the ship. LCI(L)713 has changed ownership until finally sold to the AFMM in 2003. The LCI(L) 713 has been continually restored with the goal of becoming a historically correct operating museum vessel.

LCI(L)-1091 (also a round conn, bow ramp) is moored in Eureka, California, and is owned and operated by the Humboldt Bay Air & Sea Museum. The ship was used in the Korean War in 1951–1953 as an "Infectious Disease Control Ship". Her interior was modified to accommodate a larger crew that included ten medical doctors and lab technicians. In the late 1950s the ship was sold as surplus for use as an Alaskan fishing vessel. 30 years later, the 1091 was purchased and brought to Eureka, California, in the 1990s by Ralph Davis for use as a private fishing vessel. Davis sold the ship to the museum, headed by Leroy Marsh, and they are working together to restore the LCI-1091 to an operating museum vessel.

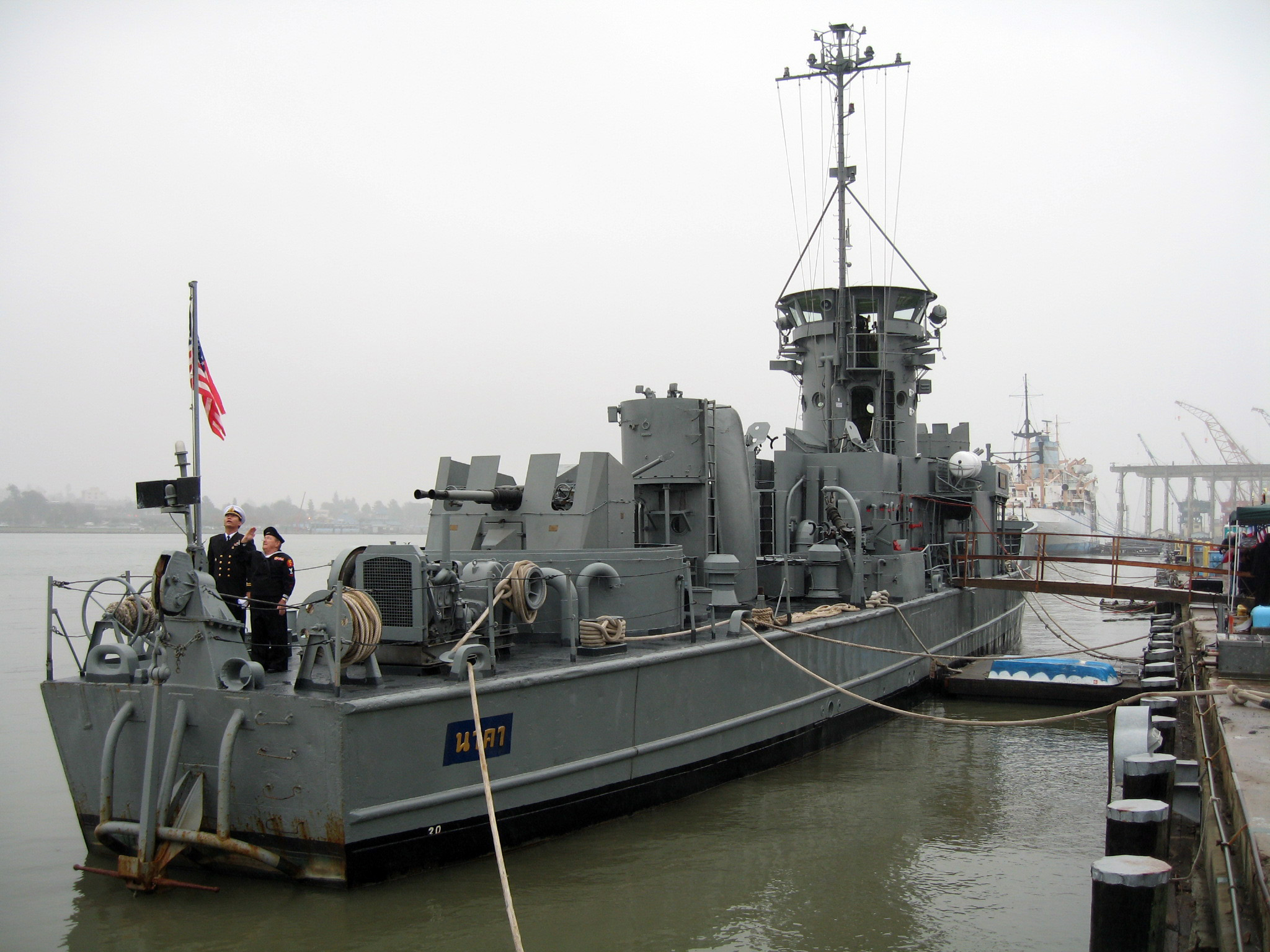
LCS-102 docked in Vallejo, California, 2007

Several former LCI hulls were obtained and modified for use as sightseeing vessels after World War II by the New York City "Circle Line". The Circle Line 7 (ex-LCI-191), Circle Line 8 (ex-LCI 179) are all now retired. Circle Line X is currently on active duty with Circle Line 42nd Street on New York City's Pier 83.

Several other LCI hulls have been located around the world. The Argentine Navy has at least three, which were still being used in 1998. LCI(L)-653, renamed Husky II, was used as a pilot boat and then a fisheries tender in Alaska before being broken up at Homer, Alaska in 2010. Three derelict LCI hulls remain at Staten Island, New York, in the Witte Marine salvage yard.

Only one LCS(L) Mk.3, the former LCS-102, still survives in original configuration. She is moored at Mare Island, California, where she is being restored to her World War II appearance by volunteers.

== See also ==
- List of United States Navy Landing Craft Infantry (LCI)
- List of United States Navy amphibious warfare ships
