= USS William D. Porter (DD-579) =

US Navy Fletcher-class destroyer in service 1942–1945

Coordinates: 27.15°N 127.41°E

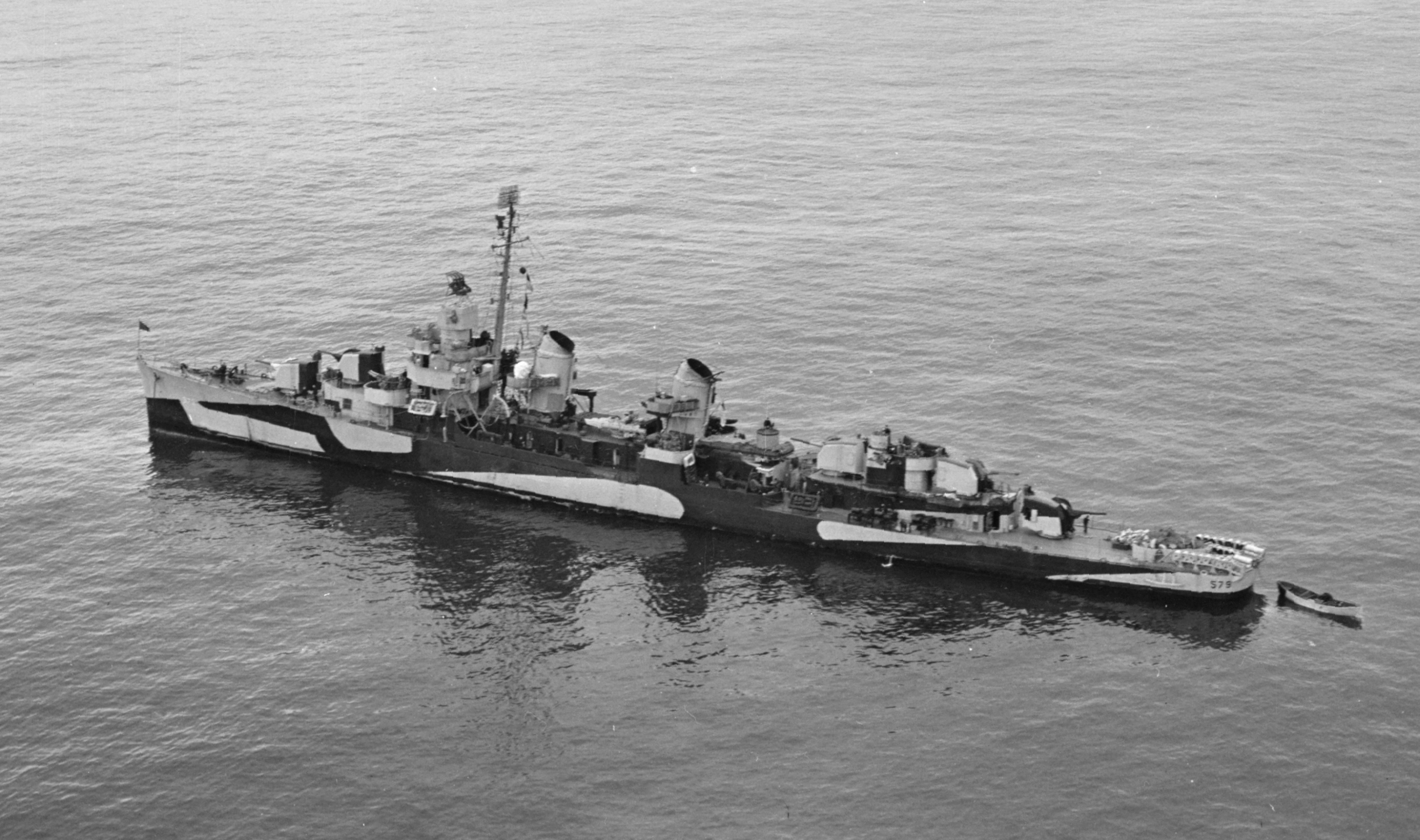
- USS William D. Porter (DD-579), in Massacre Bay, Attu, Aleutian Islands, with other destroyers, 9 June 1944.

History
- Name: USS William D. Porter (DD-579)
- Namesake: William D. Porter
- Builder: Consolidated Steel Corporation, Orange, Texas
- Laid down: 7 May 1942
- Launched: 27 September 1942
- Commissioned: 6 July 1943
- Stricken: 11 July 1945
- Fate: Sunk by kamikazes, 10 June 1945

General characteristics
- Class & type: Fletcher-class destroyer
- Displacement: 2,050 tons
- Length: 376 ft 6 in (114.7 m)
- Beam: 39 ft 8 in (12.1 m)
- Draft: 17 ft 9 in (5.4 m)
- Propulsion: 60,000 shp (45 MW); 2 propellers
- Speed: 35 knots (65 km/h; 40 mph)
- Range: 6500 nmi. (12,000 km) at 15 kn
- Complement: 273
- Armament: 5 × 5 in./38 guns (127 mm), 4 × 40 mm AA guns, 4 × 20 mm AA guns, 10 × 21 inch (533 mm) torpedo tubes, 6 × depth charge projectors, 2 × depth charge tracks

USS William D. Porter (DD-579) was a Fletcher-class destroyer of the United States Navy, named for Commodore William D. Porter (1808–1864). She served during World War II in the Atlantic and Pacific theaters, the latter of which was where she was sunk by a kamikaze aircraft.

== Construction ==
William D. Porter was laid down on 7 May 1942 at Orange, Texas, United States, by the Consolidated Steel Corporation; launched on 27 September 1942, sponsored by Miss Mary Elizabeth Reeder; and commissioned on 6 July 1943.

== Atlantic service ==
William D. Porter departed Orange shortly after being commissioned. After stops at Galveston, TX, and Algiers, LA, the destroyer headed for Guantanamo Bay, Cuba, on 30 July 1943 for shakedown. She completed shakedown a month later and, following a brief stop at Bermuda, continued on to Charleston, SC, where she arrived on 7 September. Porter completed post-shakedown repairs at Charleston and got underway for Norfolk, Va., at the end of the month. For about five weeks, the warship operated from Norfolk conducting battle practice with USS Intrepid and other ships of the Atlantic Fleet.

On 12 November 1943, the ship departed Norfolk to rendezvous with USS Iowa. Iowa, a brand new battleship, was on her way to North Africa, carrying President Franklin D. Roosevelt to the Cairo and Tehran Conferences. William D. Porter was reported to have been involved in a mishap while departing Norfolk when her anchor tore the railing and lifeboat mounts off a docked sister destroyer while maneuvering astern. William D. Porter was moored between USS Cogswell and USS Young with Cogswell pierside. None of the three ships reported giving or receiving damage to one another in their war diaries during the first half of November 1943. The next day, a depth charge from the deck of William D. Porter fell into the rough sea and exploded, causing Iowa and the other escort ships to take evasive maneuvers under the assumption that the task force had come under torpedo attack by a German U-boat. Ships logs from William D. Porter and Iowa do not mention a lost depth charge nor a U-boat search on 13 November. Both logs do mention that William D. Porter experienced a boiler tube failure on #3 boiler causing the ship to fall out of position in the formation until number 4 boiler was brought online.

On 14 November, at Roosevelt's request, Iowa conducted an anti-aircraft drill to demonstrate her ability to defend herself. The drill began with the release of a number of balloons for use as targets. While most of these were shot by gunners aboard Iowa, a few of them drifted toward William D. Porter which shot down balloons as well. Porter, along with the other escort ships, also demonstrated a torpedo drill by simulating a launch at Iowa. This drill suddenly went awry when a live torpedo discharged from mount #2 aboard William D. Porter and headed straight towards Iowa.

William D. Porter attempted to signal Iowa about the incoming torpedo but, owing to orders to maintain radio silence, used a signal lamp instead. However, the destroyer first misidentified the direction of the torpedo and then relayed the wrong message, informing Iowa that Porter was backing up, rather than that a torpedo was in the water. In desperation the destroyer finally broke radio silence, using codewords that relayed a warning message to Iowa regarding the incoming torpedo. After confirming the identity of the destroyer, Iowa turned hard to avoid being hit by the torpedo. Roosevelt, meanwhile, had learned of the incoming torpedo threat and asked his Secret Service attendee to move his wheelchair to the side of the battleship, so he could see. Not long afterward, the torpedo detonated in the ship's wake, some 3,000 yards (2,700 m) astern of Iowa. As a result of this incident, US ships would routinely greet the destroyer with the joke "Don't shoot! We're Republicans!" on account of Roosevelt being a Democrat. The entire incident lasted about 4 minutes from torpedo firing at 14:36 to detonation at 14:40.

Following these events, the ship and her crew were ordered to Bermuda for an inquiry into the Iowa affair. Chief Torpedoman (CTM(AA)) Lawton Dawson, whose failure to remove the torpedo's primer had enabled it to fire at Iowa, was later sentenced to hard labor, though Roosevelt intervened in his case and pardoned him, as the incident had been an accident. Contrary to Internet legend, LCDR Walter was not relieved of command following the incident and remained in command until 30 May 1944. He later commanded other ships and eventually became a rear admiral. William D. Porter was in Bermuda from 16 to 23 November 1943; no mention was made of awaiting Marines or the entire crew being "arrested" in the ship's logs.

On 25 November, William D. Porter returned to Norfolk and prepared for transfer to the Pacific. She got underway for that duty on 4 December, steamed via Trinidad, and reached the Panama Canal on the 12th. After transiting the canal, the destroyer set a course for San Diego, where she stopped between 19 and 21 December to take on cold weather clothing and other supplies necessary for duty in the Aleutian Islands.

== North Pacific campaign ==
On 29 December, William D. Porter arrived in Dutch Harbor, on the island of Unalaska, and joined Task Force 94 (TF 94). Between 2 and 4 January 1944, she voyaged from Dutch Harbor to Adak, whence she conducted training operations until her departure for Hawaii on the seventh. The warship entered Pearl Harbor on 22 January and remained there until 1 February at which time the destroyer put to sea again to escort USS Black Hawk to Adak. The two ships arrived at their destination nine days later, and Porter began four months of relatively uneventful duty with TF 94. She sailed between the various islands in the Aleutians chain, serving primarily as an antisubmarine escort.

Commander Charles M. Keyes (USNA '32) relieved Lieutenant Commander Walter as commanding officer on 30 May 1944.

On 10 June, the destroyer stood out of Attu and headed for the Kuril Islands. She and the other ships of TF 94 reached their destination early on the morning of the 13th. They started to shell their target, the island of Matsuwa, at 05:13. After 20 minutes, William D. Porter's radar picked up an unidentified surface vessel, closing her port quarter at a speed in excess of 55 knots (100 km/h). Her radar personnel tentatively identified the craft as an enemy PT-type boat, and the warship ceased fire on Matsuwa to take the new target under fire. Soon thereafter, the craft's reflection disappeared from the radar screen, presumably the victim of TF 94's gunfire. Not long afterward, the task force completed its mission and retired from the Kurils to refuel at Attu.

On 24 June, the destroyer left Attu with TF 94 for her second mission in the Kurils. Following two days at sea in steadily increasing fog, she arrived off Paramushiro on the 26th. In a dense fog with visibility down to about 200 yards, she delivered her gunfire and then departed with TF 94 to return to the Aleutians. A month of training exercises intervened between her second and third voyages to the Kurils. On 1 August, she cleared Kuluk Bay for her final bombardment of the Kurils. On the second day out, an enemy twin-engine bomber snooped on the task force and received a hail of fire from some of the screening destroyers. That proved to be the only noteworthy event of the mission, because the following day the bombardment was canceled due to poor weather and the enemy reconnaissance plane. William D. Porter dropped anchor in Massacre Bay at Attu on 4 August.

After a month of antisubmarine patrol, the warship departed the Aleutians for a brief yard period at San Francisco preparatory to reassignment to the western Pacific. She completed repairs and stood out of San Francisco on 27 September. She reached Oahu on 2 October and spent the ensuing fortnight in training operations out of Pearl Harbor. On the 18th, she resumed her voyage west; 12 days later, the warship pulled into Seeadler Harbor at Manus in the Admiralty Islands. She departed Manus early in November to escort USS Alshain via Hollandia to Leyte.

== Philippines campaign ==
Though William D. Porter arrived in the western Pacific too late to participate in the actual invasion at Leyte, combat conditions persisted there after her arrival in San Pedro Bay. Soon after she anchored there, Japanese planes swooped in to attack the ships in the anchorage. The first plane fell to the guns of a nearby destroyer before reaching Porter's effective range. A second intruder appeared, however, and the destroyer's 5 inch guns joined those of the assembled transports in bringing him to a fiery end in mid-air.

For the remainder of the year, William D. Porter escorted ships between Leyte, Hollandia, Manus, Bougainville, and Mindoro. On 21 December, while steaming from Leyte to Mindoro, she encountered enemy air power once again. Two planes made steep glides and dropped several bombs near the convoy. The destroyer opened up with her main battery almost as soon as the enemies appeared but to no avail. Their bombs missed their targets by a wide margin, but the two Japanese aircraft apparently suffered no damage and made good their escape. Not long thereafter, four more airborne intruders attacked. Porter concentrated her fire on the two nearest her, one of which fell to her antiaircraft fire. The second succumbed to the combined efforts of other nearby destroyers, and the remaining two presumably retired to safety. From then until midnight, enemy aircraft shadowed the convoy, but none displayed temerity enough to attack. Before dawn the following morning, she encountered and destroyed a heavily laden, but abandoned, enemy landing barge. After completing her screening mission to Mindoro, Porter returned to San Pedro Bay on 26 December to begin preparations for the invasion of Luzon.

For the Lingayen operation, William D. Porter was assigned to the Lingayen Fire Support Group of Vice Admiral Jesse B. Oldendorf's Bombardment and Fire Support Group (TG 77.2). The destroyer departed San Pedro Bay on 2 January 1945 and joined her unit in Leyte Gulf the following day. The entire group then passed south through the Surigao Strait, thence crossed the Mindanao Sea, rounded the southern tip of Negros, and then proceeded generally north along the western coasts of Negros, Panay, Mindoro, and finally, Luzon.

By the time the unit reached the southwestern coast of Luzon, it came within the effective range of Luzon-based aircraft. Beginning on the morning of 5 January, enemy planes—including kamikazes—brought the force under attack. William D. Porter saw no action during the first stage of those attacks, because the group's combat air patrol (CAP) provided an effective protective blanket. However, the last raid broke through the CAP umbrella at 16:50 and charged to the attack. Porter took three of those planes under fire at about 17:13, but growing darkness precluded evaluation of the results of that engagement. During that raid, cruiser USS Louisville and escort carrier USS Manila Bay suffered extensive damage from kamikaze crashes.

Before dawn on the sixth, the destroyer moved into Lingayen Gulf with her unit to begin pre-invasion bombardment. Throughout the day, enemy planes made sporadic attacks upon the bombarding ships. That evening, William D. Porter began firing on shore batteries guarding the approaches to the landing beaches. At 17:38, her attention was diverted to a lone plane, and her antiaircraft battery brought it down handily. Twenty minutes later, a twin-engine Mitsubishi G4M "Betty" ran afoul of the destroyer's gunners who splashed this one neatly as well. Porter then returned to her primary mission, shore bombardment.

After the landings on 9 January, the destroyer's mission changed to call fire and night harassing fire in support of the troops. Then, from 11 to 18 January, she stood off Lingayen Gulf with TG 77.2 to protect the approaches from incursion by enemy surface forces. On the 18th, she reentered the gulf to resume support duty for forces ashore and to contribute to the anchorage's air and antisubmarine defenses. On 3 February, the warship bombarded abandoned enemy barges to assure that they would not be used against the invasion force or as evacuation vehicles. She then resumed her antisubmarine and air defense role until 15 February, when she departed Lingayen Gulf to escort USS Lindenwald and USS Epping Forest to Guam.

== Battle of Okinawa ==
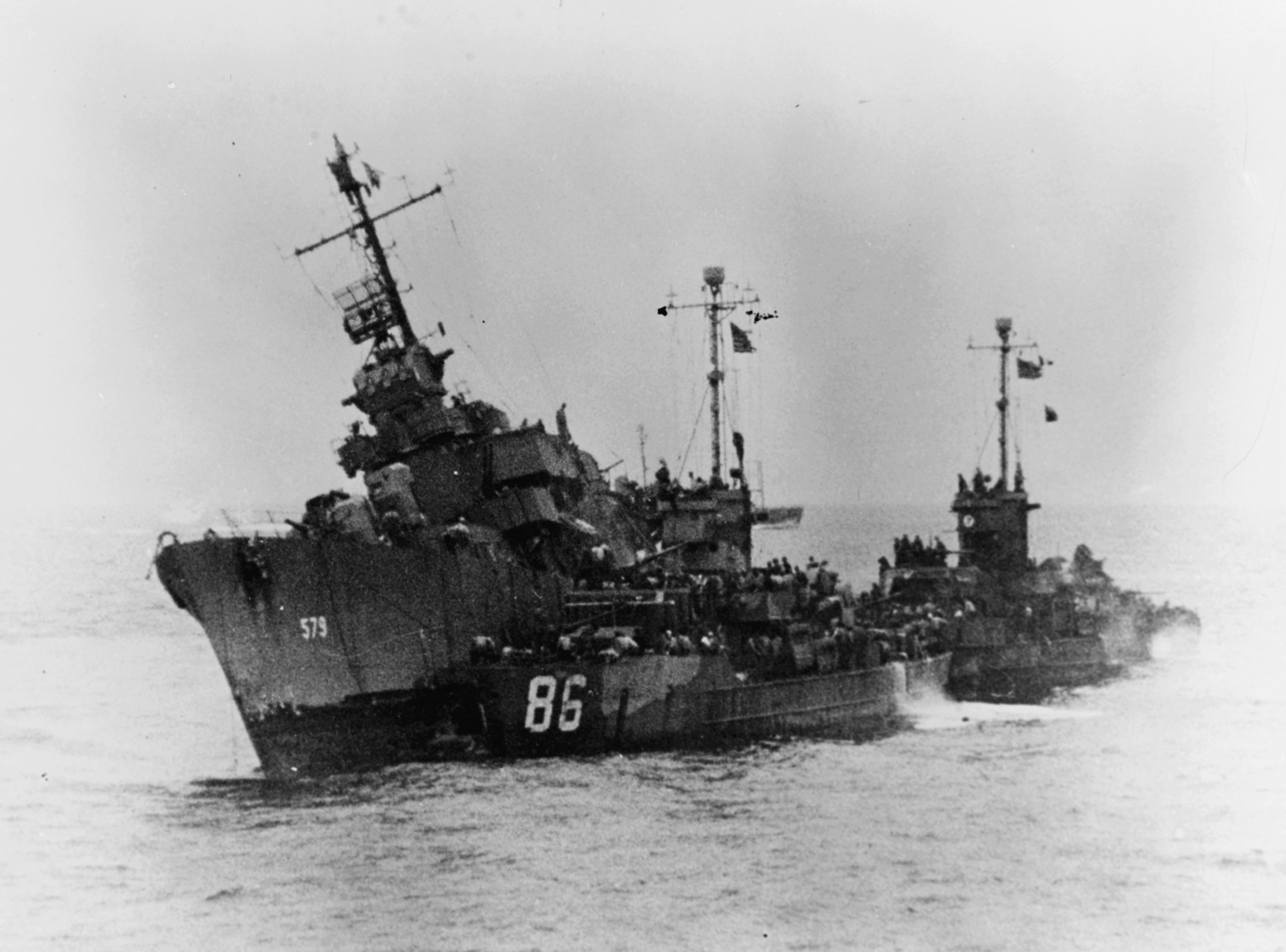
Damaged William D. Porter listing heavily. Landing Craft Support ships LCS(L)(3)-86 and LCS(L)(3)-122 (behind) are assisting.

After returning briefly to Lingayen Gulf, William D. Porter moved on to Leyte to prepare for the assault on Okinawa. She remained at Leyte during the first half of March, then joined the gunfire support unit attached to the Western Islands Attack Group for a week of gunnery practice at Cabugan Island. She departed the Philippines on 21 March, reached the Ryukyu Islands on the morning of the 25th, and began supporting the virtually unopposed occupation of Kerama Retto. Between 25 March and 1 April, she provided antiaircraft and antisubmarine protection for the ships in the Kerama roadstead, while performing some fire-support duties in response to what little resistance the troops met ashore on the islets of Kerama Retto.

However, by the time the main assault on Okinawa began on the morning of 1 April, she had been reassigned to TF 54, Rear Admiral Morton L. Deyo's Gunfire and Covering Force. During her association with that task organization, William D. Porter rendered fire support for the troops conquering Okinawa, provided antisubmarine and antiaircraft defenses for the larger warships of TF 54, and protected minesweepers during their operations. Between 1 April and 5 May, she expended in excess of 8,500 rounds of 5 inch shells—both at shore targets and at enemy aircraft during the almost incessant aerial attacks on the invasion force. During that period, she added five additional plane kills to her tally.

The constant air raids—launched from Kyūshū and Formosa—prompted the Americans to establish a cordon of radar picket ships around Okinawa, and it was to this duty that William D. Porter switched in early May. Between 5 May and 9 June, she stood picket duty, warned the fleet of the approach of enemy air raids, and vectored interceptors out to meet the attackers. She brought down another enemy plane with her own guns, and fighters under her direction accounted for seven more. At some point during the early part of the Battle of Okinawa, it is claimed that William D. Porter accidentally damaged USS Luce, but the incident is not mentioned in contemporary war reports discussing the sinking of Luce on 4 May 1945. At the time of Luce's sinking, William D. Porter was at Hagushi anchorage and Luce was north of Aguni Island, more than 30 miles away.

On 10 June 1945, William D. Porter was destroyed by a kamikaze attack. At 0815 that morning, an Aichi D3A "Val" dive bomber dropped out of the clouds and splashed down near the warship, exploding directly beneath its keel. Due to the force of the underwater blast, Porter was lifted partially out of the water and then dropped back again. She sustained broken steam lines and lost power, and several fires broke out. For three hours, her crew struggled in vain to extinguish the fires, repair the damage, and keep the ship afloat. The order to abandon ship went out, after which the ship heeled over to starboard and sank by its stern. There were no fatalities among the crew. The warship's name was struck from the Naval Vessel Register on 11 July 1945.

William D. Porter received four battle stars for her service in World War II.

== Wreck discovery ==
On 24 March 2026, the Lost 52 Project, led by Tiburon Subsea CEO Tim Taylor announced that the wreck of the William D Porter had been discovered as part of their Bonefish Expedition in 2025.

== See also ==
- Lieutenant Richard M. McCool, captain of the landing ship LCS(L)(3)-122, received the Medal of Honor in part for assisting in rescue of survivors of William D. Porter.
