= Detroit diesel 6051 quad-71 =

Detroit Diesel/General Motors

Overview
- Manufacturer: Detroit Diesel, General Motors
- Production: 1942

Layout
- Configuration: Multibank (4-bank X24)
- Displacement: 28.0 L (1,710 cu in)
- Cylinder bore: 4.25 in (108 mm)
- Piston stroke: 5 in (127 mm)
- Cylinder block material: Iron
- Cylinder head material: Iron
- Valvetrain: 12 valve (2 per cyl.)

Combustion
- Fuel type: Diesel
- Cooling system: heat exchanger

Output
- Power output: rated at 900hp per quad power pack

The GM Diesel/Detroit Diesel model 6051 Quad power pack consists of four inline 2-stroke diesel 6-71 engines mounted to one gearbox, usually with one shaft coming out of the power unit. The power units were fitted on landing craft and ships during World War II, ships including LCI(L), Prab (741) and Nahka (751) were fitted with two of these power units to drive two propellers, Mataphon (761) was fitted with three. There is a later model of this power pack which has a standard solid shaft for fixed pitch props while the 6051 model is specially designed with a hollow main shaft and a sliding inner shaft with a hub on the end that changes the pitch on the propeller.

== Specifications ==
- number of engines - 4
- model of engines - 671LA28H, 67LC28H, 671RC28H, 671RA28H series 71 engines
- Number of cylinders per engine- 6
- Bore - 4¼ "
- stroke - 5"
- cubic inch per cylinder 71ci
- cubic inch per engine 426ci, 7.0L
- Engine RPM- 500 to 2100
- gearbox reduction ratio- 3.23-1
- rated HP - 900 total
- lube oil Cap. per engine - dry, 19 qts
- lube oil Cap. per engine -refill, 17qts
- cooling wat Cap. - 142qts total
- starter motor - 24v, solenoid operated
- clutch - 16" single plate, dry disc
- gearbox oil cap. - 6½ gal
- propeller - controllable pitch
- prop size - 46"
- control - electrical control switch at log desk

== See also ==
- Detroit Diesel Series 71
- Gray Marine 6-71 Diesel Engine
- LCI(L)
- Two-stroke diesel engine
