= USS LCI(L)-326 =

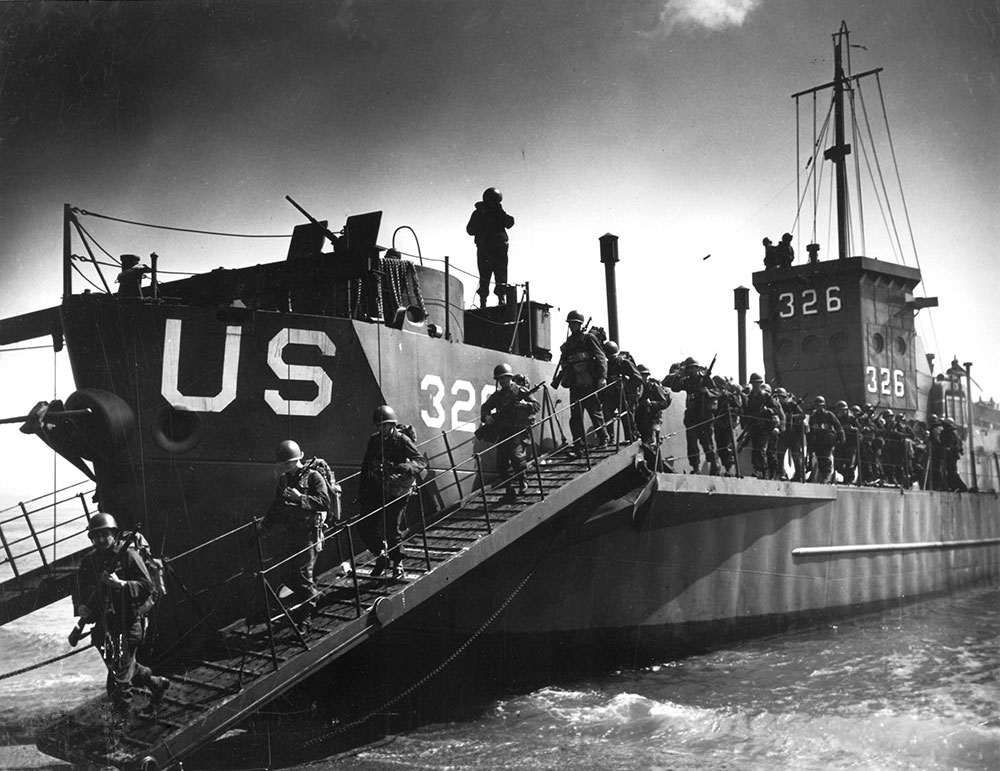
- USS LCI(L)-326 during training for D-Day

History

United States
- Name: USS LCI(L)-326
- Builder: Brown Shipbuilding, Orange, Texas
- Laid down: 22 December 1942
- Launched: 2 February 1943
- Commissioned: 15 February 1943, as USS LCI(L)-326
- Decommissioned: May 1946
- Stricken: 1946
- Honors and awards: 4 battle stars & Coast Guard Unit Commendation (World War II)
- Fate: Transferred to the Maritime Commission for disposal, 2 February 1948

General characteristics
- Class & type: LCI(L)-351 class large landing craft
- Displacement: 216 long tons (219 t) light; 234 long tons (238 t) landing; 389 long tons (395 t) loaded
- Length: 158 ft 5.5 in (48.3 m)
- Beam: 23 ft 3 in (7.1 m)
- Draft: Light : 3 ft 1.5 in (0.95 m) mean; Landing : 2 ft 8 in (0.81 m) forward; 4 ft 10 in (1.47 m) aft; Loaded : 5 ft 4 in (1.63 m) forward; 5 ft 11 in (1.80 m) aft
- Propulsion: 8 General Motors diesel engines, 4 per shaft, 1,600 bhp (1,193 kW); Twin variable-pitch propellers; Fuel Capacity 130 tons, lube oil 200 gal.
- Speed: 15.5 knots (28.7 km/h; 17.8 mph)
- Range: 4,000 nmi (7,400 km) at 12 kn (22 km/h; 14 mph) loaded; 500 nmi (930 km) at 15 kn (28 km/h; 17 mph)
- Capacity: 75 tons cargo
- Troops: 188
- Complement: 4 Officers, 24 Enlisted
- Armament: 5 × single 20 mm guns; 2 × .50 cal machine guns
- Armor: 2-inch (51 mm) plastic splinter protection on gun turrets, conning tower and pilot house

USS LCI(L)-326 was an LCI(L)-351-class landing craft infantry built for the United States Coast Guard during World War II. Like most ships of her class, she was not named and was known only by her designation. She participated in numerous battles throughout the war, and successfully landed troops through the Mediterranean, European, and Pacific Theaters.

== Service history ==
After launching from Austin, Texas, LCI(L)-326 aided in the Occupation of Tunisia in June of 1943, and shortly thereafter participated in both Operation Husky and Operation Avalanche, landing troops in Sicily and Salerno from July to September of 1943. The next six months were spent preparing for the Normandy Landings of 6 June 1944, when the ship and its crew successfully landed troops of the VII Corps on Utah Beach. After making multiple landings under constant enemy fire and securing the Cotentin Peninsula, the Landing Craft's commanding officer Lieutenant Samuel W. Allison was granted a Silver Star. After repairs and a change of crew LCI(L)-326 was used to create smoke screens and deliver messages during the Battle of Okinawa in Japan from May to September of 1945.

After returning to the United States in March of 1946, the landing craft received four Battle Stars and a Coast Guard Unit Commendation before being decommissioned later that year and sold for disposal in 1948.

== Awards, Citations and Campaign Ribbons ==
Four Battle Stars, World War II
Combat Action Ribbon
American Campaign Medal
European–African–Middle Eastern Campaign Medal
Asiatic-Pacific Campaign Medal
World War II Victory Medal
Navy Occupation Service Medal (Asia)

=== Individual Honors ===
Silver Star, Lt. Samuel W. Allison, 6 June 1944 at Normandy
