= Detroit Diesel Series 71 =

Series 71
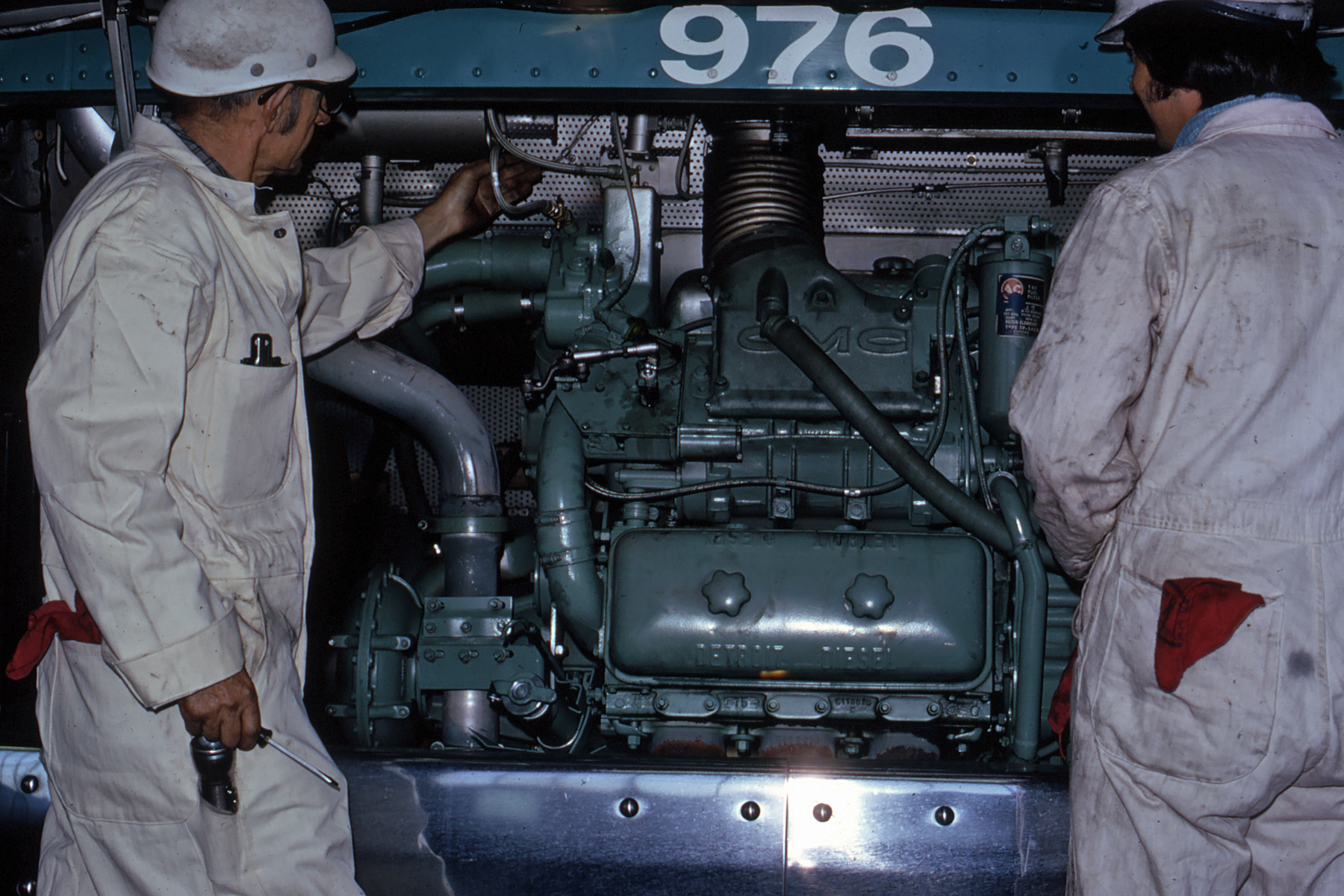
- Detroit Diesel 6V71

Overview
- Manufacturer: Detroit Diesel
- Production: 1938–1995

Layout
- Configuration: Multi-cylinder, inline and V-type
- Displacement: 71 cu in (1.2 L) per cylinder
- Cylinder bore: 4 1/4 in (108 mm)
- Piston stroke: 5 in (127 mm)
- Cylinder block material: Cast iron
- Valvetrain: Pushrod-operated; 2 or 4 valves per cylinder
- Valvetrain drive system: Gears
- Compression ratio: 18.7:1 (N/A); 17.0:1 (Turbo)

Combustion
- Turbocharger: On some versions
- Fuel system: Unit fuel injection
- Fuel type: Diesel
- Cooling system: Water-cooled

Output
- Power output: 109–800 bhp (81–597 kW)
- Torque output: 299–2,150 lb⋅ft (405–2,915 N⋅m)

Dimensions
- Length: 36–79 in (910–2,010 mm)
- Width: 29–47 in (740–1,190 mm)
- Height: 39–59 in (990–1,500 mm)
- Dry weight: 1,525–4,820 lb (692–2,186 kg)

Chronology
- Successor: Series 92; Series 60

The Detroit Diesel Series 71 is a two-stroke diesel engine family that was available in both inline and V engine configurations, designed by General Motors and principally manufactured by Detroit Diesel (historically its subsidiary). The number 71 refers to the nominal displacement per cylinder in cubic inches, a rounding off of 70.93 cu in (1.2 L). The 6V-71 was commonly nicknamed “Screaming Jimmy” due to its distinctive high-pitched sound at its operating speed of 2,100 rpm. The engine’s characteristic noise could make it sound as though it were operating at nearly 4,200 rpm.

Inline engines were produced with 1, 2, 3, 4 or 6 cylinders, and V engines with 6, 8, 12, 16 or 24 cylinders.

== History ==
The inline six-cylinder 71 series engine was introduced as the initial flagship product of the Detroit Diesel Engine Division of General Motors in 1938.

This engine was in high demand during WWII, necessitating a dramatic increase in output: about 57,000 6-71s were used on American landing craft, including 19,000 on LCVPs, about 8,000 on LCM Mk 3, and about 9,000 in quads on LCIs; and 39,000 were used in armor, including 4,000 on Valentine tanks, 22,000 in double packs on M4A2s, and 11,000 on M10 tank destroyers.

The V-type first appeared in 1957.

Sales of the Series 71 ceased in the summer of 1995, with the four-stroke Detroit Diesel engine introduced as a replacement.

== Design ==
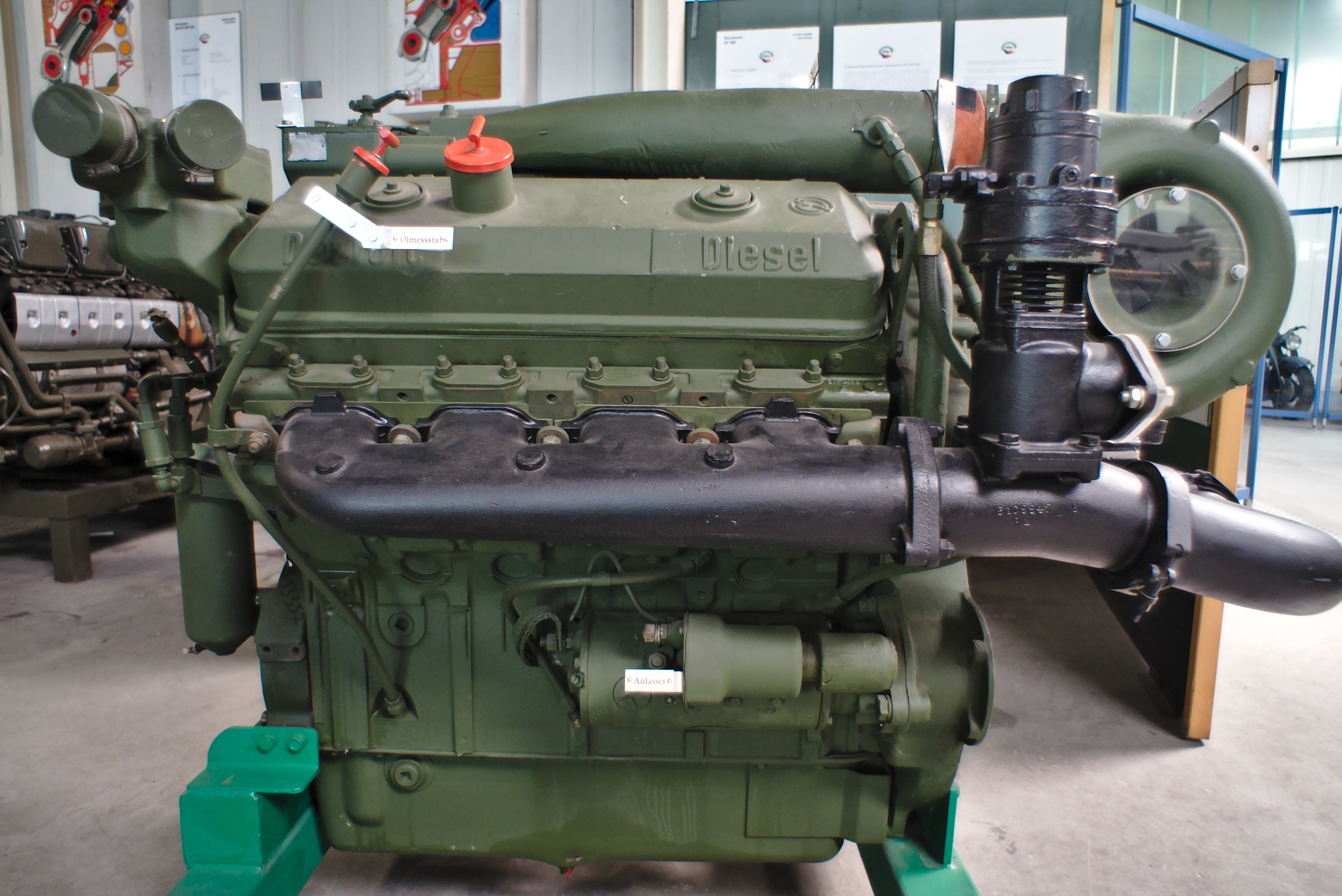
Detroit Diesel 8V-71T as used in the U.S. M109 self-propelled howitzer

Bore and stroke are the same across all units, at 4 1/4 in × 5 in (108 mm × 127 mm). Inline models were famously "symmetrical," meaning that the blower, exhaust, water manifold, starter, and other components could be mounted on either side of the basic block to fit a particular application. A number of models could also run with the crankshaft turning either clockwise or counter-clockwise, called "Right Hand" or "Left Hand" rotation engines (as viewed from the front of the engine). The less-common Left Hand engines were typically used in buses, because the rotation matched rear-engined transverse installations. Boats equipped with two engines would typically use one Left Hand and one Right Hand, so that the torque from the propellers would cancel each other out, without the need for a complex reversing gear on one side.

As a two-stroke diesel engine that does not use crankcase aspiration cannot naturally draw in combustion air, the blower is inherently necessary to charge the cylinders with air for combustion. The blower also assists in scavenging spent combustion gasses at the end of the power stroke. All Series 71 engines use uniflow scavenging, in which a gear-driven Roots blower mounted to the exterior of the engine provides intake air through cored passages in the engine block and ports in the cylinder walls at slightly greater than atmospheric pressure. The engine exhausts through pushrod-operated poppet valves in the cylinder head(s), with either two or four valves per cylinder. Unit fuel injection is employed, one injector per cylinder, with no high fuel pressure outside of the injector body. The injectors are cycled from the same gear-driven camshaft responsible for opening the exhaust valves.

The two largest V units used multiple cylinder heads per bank to keep the head size and weight to manageable proportions, the V16 using four heads from the four-cylinder inline model, and the V24 using four heads from the inline six-cylinder model. This feature also assisted in reducing the overall cost of these large engines by maintaining parts commonality with the smaller models.

== Applications ==
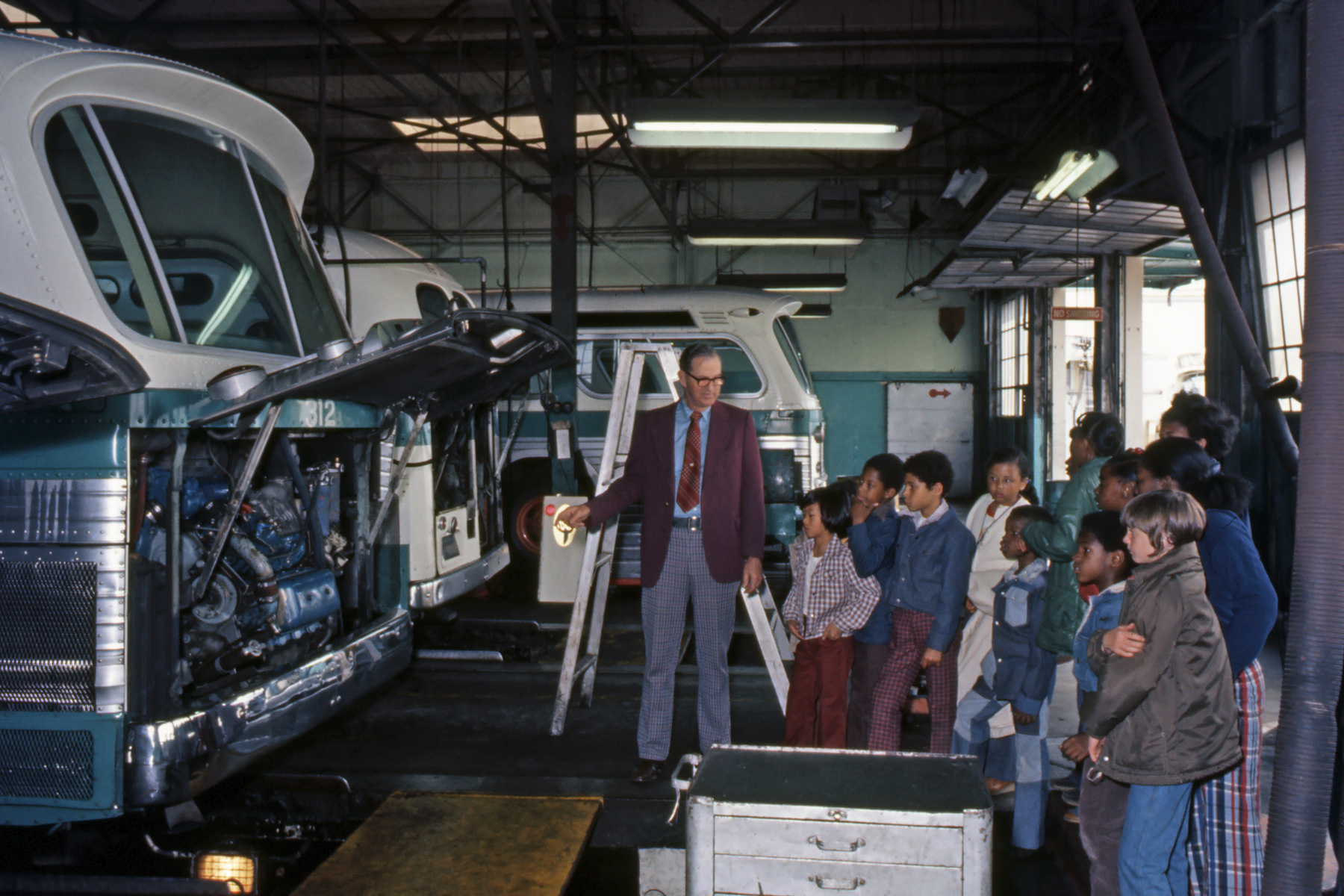
General Motors transit bus powered by a rear-mounted 6V-71 Detroit Diesel engine.

The most popular incarnations of the series 71 engine as used for highway vehicle applications included the inline 6-71, the V-block 6V-71 (both widely used in transit buses) and the 8V-71 V-8. In addition to motorcoach propulsion, both inline and V types have found extensive usage in school buses, trucks, fire apparatus, motor homes, construction and industrial machinery, a few farm tractors, commercial fishing vessels, and military vehicles and equipment.

The 71 series is very popular in marine applications, not only as a propulsion engine in small craft (Gray Marine 6-71) but as auxiliary power to drive generators, winches and other heavy shipboard machinery. The Detroit inline 6-71 engine, in all of its variations, was also available as a "pancake engine" (here variably called either 6L-71 or 6N-71) for horizontal (underfloor) mount applications, such as on larger Crown and Gillig school buses and articulated puller transit buses (such as the Crown-Ikarus 286). Many 4-71 engines were used in various types of construction equipment, such as Galion highway graders.

A 6-cylinder version was used in the Victorian Railways DERM railmotor and the Commonwealth Railways NDH railcars in Australia.

The inline 6-71 was adapted to British requirements as the power plant for Canadian (and later British) built Valentine tanks where it was known as the GMC 6004, orders being placed in late September 1940.

The 6046 was a twin engine setup used by U.S. and British tanks and tank destroyers, including the M3A3 (Lee IV/Lee V) and M3A5 (Grant II) variants of the M3 tank, the M4A2 variant of the M4 Sherman tank, the M10 tank destroyer and the re-gunned British variant, the 17pdr SP Achilles, and the M36B2 variant of the M36 tank destroyer.

The Detroit Diesel 6051 quad-71 was a Detroit Diesel Series 6-71 side by side tandem engine setup of two banks of four engines each driving two propeller shafts in Landing Craft Infantry LCI(L). The eight engines produced a total of 1,600 bhp (1,193 kW).

In the Soviet Union, versions of this engine family were produced at the YaAZ automobile factory in Yaroslavl. Throughout World War II, the 4-71 engine both in locally assembled form (built by Lend-Lease provided American industrial equipment) and from U.S.-supplied kits had been used for Ya-12 light artillery tractors. After 1945, the 4-71 engine entered production in a slightly modified configuration (deuniversalization, conversion to metric units, a more powerful preheater) to suit the conditions of the Soviet Union, and was designated YaAZ-204. After 1947, the factory used a copy of the 6-71 engine, designated YaAZ-206, in the YaAZ-210 and YaAZ-214 heavy trucks built from 1951 to 1959. The vehicle production was transferred to KrAZ in Kremenchuk, Ukraine in 1959, where trucks with newer versions of the YaAZ-206 stood in production until the appearance of the four-stroke V8-engined KrAZ-255 in 1967. Soviet made MAZ-200 from the Minsk Automobile Plant used the YaAZ-204 up to the 1960s.

== Variants ==
Series 71 engines have a basic engine designation, such as 8V-71TA. The first number refers to the number of cylinders in the engine, followed by "V" for V engines, or if not present, it is an inline engine (whether in an upright or laid-over installation). The designation continues with a hyphen, and "71" for the nominal displacement per cylinder in cubic inches (about 1.2 L).

When the basic engine designation includes a suffix, it denotes additional features. Engines suffixed "N" or "E" have higher compression ratios than engines lacking a suffix. "T" suffixes indicate turbocharging. (Note: Later versions with a "T" suffix included improved water jacketing in the engine block, cross-head pistons and a revised vaneless turbocharger.) With aftercooling, they were suffixed "TA". (Note: Later versions known as the Silver 71 had a 3-pass aftercooler, a bypass valve on the intake and a thermostatic oil cooler.) "TT" indicates Tailored Torque and "TTA" Tailored Torque Aftercooled; these models are designated for economy (Fuel Squeezer) and constant horsepower ratings. A suffix "(C)" was appended for models compliant with 1985 California emissions standards.

There is also an 8-digit series of model numbers used across the range of Detroit Diesel engines. These are marked on the engine block near the serial number, and they indicate which arrangement of parts is used. Direction of rotation is specified as "R" for right-hand (i.e. clockwise crankshaft rotation looking from the end furthest from the transmission), or "L" for left-hand. Generally, truck engines are right-handed and coach engines are left-handed. Several accessory configurations are denoted "A" through "D" (e.g. "C" is a truck configuration with left-side starter and right-side oil cooler, and "D" is a coach configuration with both starter and oil cooler on the right side.). Marine and industrial multiple engine units use several arrangements.

Detroit Diesel (2 cycle) common model and suffix codes
Model codes	Description
L	Low profile
V	V-block
N	Needle Unit Injectors, four exhaust valves (per cylinder)
T	Turbocharged
TA	Turbocharged Aftercooled (JWAC Jacket Water Aftercooled)
TAC	Turbocharged Aftercooled California Certification (JWAC Jacket Water Aftercooled)
TT	Tailored Torque (Fuel Squeezer)
TTA	Tailored Torque Aftercooled (Fuel Squeezer Plus) (JWAC Jacket Water Aftercooled)
TI	Turbocharged Intercooled
TIB	Turbocharged Intercooled Bypass Blower

Model	Displacement	Engine configuration	Power
1-71	1.2 L (71 cu in)	Single-cylinder	34 hp (25 kW)
2-71	2.3 L (142 cu in)	I-2	68 hp (51 kW)
3-71	3.5 L (213 cu in)	I-3	113 hp (84 kW)
4-71	4.7 L (284 cu in)	I-4	160 hp (119 kW)
6-71	7.0 L (426 cu in)	I-6	170 hp (127 kW)
6V-71	7.0 L (426 cu in)	V-6	238 hp (177 kW)
8V-71	9.3 L (568 cu in)	V-8	318 hp (237 kW)
12V-71	14.0 L (852 cu in)	V-12	450 hp (336 kW)
16V-71	18.6 L (1,136 cu in)	V-16	635 hp (474 kW)

Series 71 specifications for selected models
Family	Model	Torque	Power	Length × Width × Height	Weight
3-71	3-71	299 lb⋅ft (405 N⋅m) @ 1400 rpm	109 hp (81 kW) @ 2100 rpm	36 in × 29 in × 41 in (0.91 m × 0.74 m × 1.04 m)	1,525 lb (692 kg)
4-71	4-71	385–400 lb⋅ft (522–542 N⋅m) @ 1600 rpm	140–152 hp (104–113 kW) @ 2100 rpm	42 in × 29 in × 42 in (1.07 m × 0.74 m × 1.07 m)	1,780 lb (807 kg)
4-71	4-71T	525 lb⋅ft (712 N⋅m) @ 1400 rpm	190 hp (142 kW) @ 2100 rpm	44 in × 31 in × 44 in (1.12 m × 0.79 m × 1.12 m)	1,830 lb (830 kg)
6-71	6-71	600–612 lb⋅ft (813–830 N⋅m) @ 1600 rpm	170–228 hp (127–170 kW) @ 2100 rpm	54 in × 29 in × 39 in (1.37 m × 0.74 m × 0.99 m)	2,230 lb (1,012 kg)
6-71	6-71T	762–801 lb⋅ft (1,033–1,086 N⋅m) @ 1400 rpm	275–285 hp (205–213 kW) @ 2100 rpm	56 in × 32 in × 50 in (1.42 m × 0.81 m × 1.27 m)	2,195–2,240 lb (996–1,016 kg)
6-71	6-71TT	853 lb⋅ft (1,157 N⋅m) @ 1200 rpm	230 hp (172 kW) @ 1950 rpm	56 in × 32 in × 52 in (1.42 m × 0.81 m × 1.32 m)	2,195 lb (996 kg)
6V-71	6V-71	600 lb⋅ft (813 N⋅m) @ 1600 rpm	228 hp (170 kW) @ 2100 rpm	41 in × 39 in × 48 in (1.04 m × 0.99 m × 1.22 m)	2,380 lb (1,080 kg)
6V-71	6V-71T	725 lb⋅ft (983 N⋅m) @ 1600 rpm	262 hp (195 kW) @ 2100 rpm	41 in × 40 in × 53 in (1.0 m × 1.0 m × 1.3 m)	2,380 lb (1,080 kg)
8V-71	8V-71	800 lb⋅ft (1,085 N⋅m) @ 1600 rpm	304 hp (227 kW) @ 2100 rpm	47 in × 39 in × 51 in (1.19 m × 0.99 m × 1.30 m)	2,310 lb (1,048 kg)
8V-71	8V-71T	965 lb⋅ft (1,308 N⋅m) @ 1600 rpm	350 hp (261 kW) @ 2100 rpm	50 in × 40 in × 53 in (1.3 m × 1.0 m × 1.3 m)	2,495 lb (1,132 kg)
8V-71	8V-71TA	1,064 lb⋅ft (1,443 N⋅m) @ 1200 rpm	370 hp (276 kW) @ 2100 rpm	43 in × 38 in × 49 in (1.09 m × 0.97 m × 1.24 m)	2,415 lb (1,095 kg)
8V-71	8V-71TTA	1,064 lb⋅ft (1,443 N⋅m) @ 1200 rpm	305 hp (227 kW) @ 2100 rpm	43 in × 38 in × 49 in (1.09 m × 0.97 m × 1.24 m)	2,415 lb (1,095 kg)
12V-71	12V-71	1,200 lb⋅ft (1,627 N⋅m) @ 1600 rpm	456 hp (340 kW) @ 2100 rpm	60 in × 46 in × 58 in (1.5 m × 1.2 m × 1.5 m)	3,210 lb (1,456 kg)
12V-71	12V-71T	1,450 lb⋅ft (1,966 N⋅m) @ 1600 rpm	525 hp (391 kW) @ 2100 rpm	70 in × 46 in × 55 in (1.8 m × 1.2 m × 1.4 m)	3,550 lb (1,610 kg)
16V-71 (two joined 8V71 engine blocks)	16V-71TI	2,150 lb⋅ft (2,915 N⋅m) @ 1600 rpm	800 hp (597 kW) @ 2100 rpm	79 in × 47 in × 59 in (2.0 m × 1.2 m × 1.5 m)	4,820 lb (2,186 kg)

=== Model numbers ===
Series 71 sample model numbers
Engine	Model numbers	Injectors	Rated gross power	
Engine	Model numbers	Injectors	kW	BHP
25993	1033–5000		81	
	1033–7000		81	
26024	1043–5000	N60	104	140
26024	1043–5000	N65	113	152
4-71 + Torque Converter	1043–5001	N65	113	152
26024	1043–7000	N60	104	140
26024	1043–7000	N65	113	152
4-71T	1043–8300	N75	142	190
26085	1063–5000	N65	170	228
26085	1063–5000	N65		228
6-71 + Torque Converter	1063–5001	N65	170	228
26085	1063–5100	N65		218
	1063–7000			228
26085	1063–7000	N65	170	228
26085	1063–7100	N65		218
6-71T	1063–8300	N75	213	285
6-71T	1063–8340	7C75	205	275
6-71TT	1063–8740	7E+75	172	230
6V71	7063–7000	N65	170	228
6V71 + Torque Converter	7063–7001	N65	170	228
6V71T	7063–7300	N75	195	262
8V71	7083–7000	N65	227	304
8V71 + Torque Converter	7083–7001	N65	227	304
8V71	7087–7040	7E+65	227	304
8V71T	7083–7300	N75	261	350
8V71T	7087–7340	N75		350
	7087–7344	N65		308
	7087–7344	N70		335
8V71TA	7087–7640	7C75	276	370
8V71TT	7087–7340	N75	228	305
8V71TTA	7087–7940	7C75	228	305
12V71 +Torque Converter	7123–7001		340	

== See also ==
- List of Detroit Diesel products

== Sources ==
- Shelton, Chris. "Then, Now, and Forever" in Hot Rod, March 2017, pp.16-29.
