= USS LCS(L)(3)-102 =

Landing Craft Support ship of the US Navy

Coordinates: 38.106128°N 122.273799°W

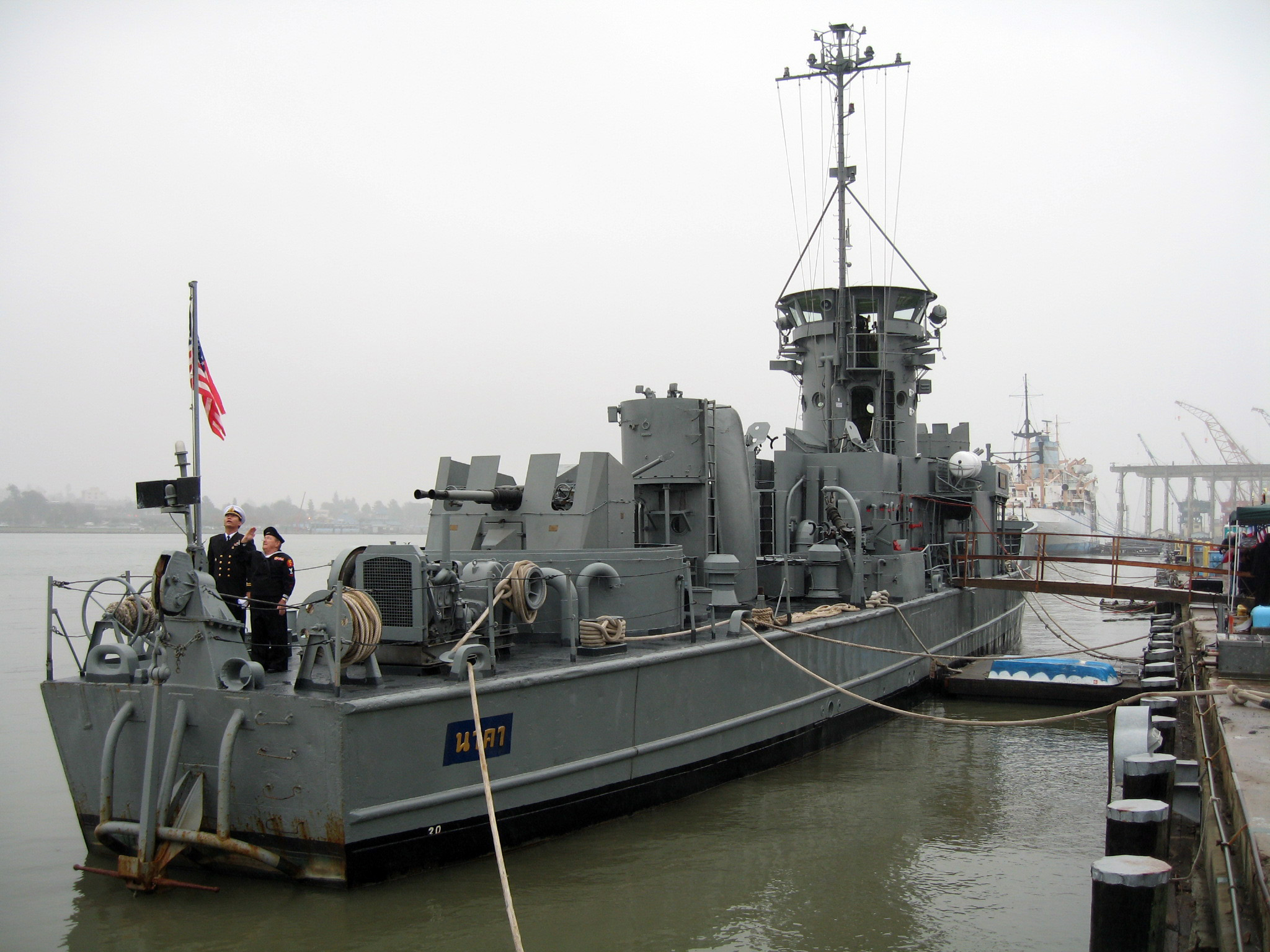
- USS LCS(L)-102 at Vallejo, California, 2007

History

United States
- Name: LCS(L)(3)-102
- Laid down: 13 January 1945
- Launched: 3 February 1945
- Commissioned: 17 February 1945
- Reclassified: LSSL-102, 28 February 1949
- Fate: Transferred to Japan, 30 April 1953
- Honors and awards: one battle star

Japan
- Name: Himawari
- Acquired: 30 April 1953
- Out of service: 1966
- Fate: Transferred to Thailand, 18 April 1966

Thailand
- Name: Nakha
- Namesake: Nakha Islands
- Acquired: 1966
- Out of service: September 2007
- Identification: Hull number: LSSL-751
- Fate: Returned to the US, became a museum ship since September 2007

General characteristics
- Class & type: LCS(L)(3)-1 Class Landing Craft Support ship
- Displacement: 250 tons (light); 387 tons (full load)
- Length: 158 ft (48 m)
- Beam: 23 ft 8 in (7.21 m)
- Draft: 5 ft 8 in (1.73 m)
- Propulsion: Diesel engines
- Speed: 16.5 knots (max); 12 knots (econ)
- Range: 5,500 nautical miles at 12 knots
- Complement: 8 officers, 70 enlisted
- Armament: 1 × 3 in (76 mm) gun; 2 × twin 40 mm guns; 4 × single 20 mm guns; 10 × Mk7 rocket launcher
- Armor: 10-lb. STS splinter shields
- USS LCS-102 (Landing Craft Support)
- U.S. National Register of Historic Places
- Location: Vallejo, California
- NRHP reference No.: 15000716
- Added to NRHP: 13 October 2015

USS LCS(L)(3)-102 is an LCS(L)(3)-1 Class Landing Craft Support ship built for the United States Navy during World War II. The vessel was completed near the end of the war and saw brief service during the Battle of Okinawa. After the war, LCS(L)(3)-102 served in China before being decommissioned in 1946 and then transferred to Japan in mid-1953. Serving under the name JDS Himawari, the vessel remained in Japan until mid-1966 when she was transferred to Thailand, becoming the HTMS Nakha. In 2007, after being retired, the ship was returned to the United States to become a museum ship.

Now the sole remaining vessel of her class, she remains docked at the site of the former Mare Island Naval Shipyard, in Vallejo, CA.

== Design and construction ==
USS LCS(L)(3)-102 was laid down 13 January 1945 at Commercial Iron Works in Portland, Oregon. The vessel was launched on 3 February 1945 and commissioned on 17 February. As built, the vessel displaced 250-tons without load, and 387 tons at full load. She was 158 feet (48 m) long, with a beam of 23 feet 6 inches (7.16 m) and a draft of 5 feet 8 inches (1.73 m). With a crew of six officers and 65 enlisted personnel, at maximum endurance she had a range of 5,500 nautical miles at a cruising speed of 12 knots; power was provided by two propellers that were driven by four General Motors 6-71 per-shaft 1,600 horse power diesel engines.

=== Armament ===
She was armed with an array of weapons, including: a single 3-inch gun mounted on her bow; two twin-mounted 40mm anti-aircraft guns; four single-mounted 20mm anti-aircraft guns; four .50 caliber machine-guns and ten rocket launchers. Armor included 10-pound (4.5 kg) splinter shields which were placed on the gun mounts, the pilot house and the conning tower.

Her ten Mk7 rocket launchers were removed sometime after decommissioning, presumably before transfer into the Japanese Maritime Self-Defense Force.

== Operational history ==
After commissioning, the LCS(L)(3)-102 was assigned to the Asiatic-Pacific Theater. World War II was in its final stages at the time, but she arrived in time to participate in the Battle of Okinawa, participating in the Gunto operation between 18 and 30 June 1945. During the battle, she was hit by a kamikaze on 11 June. Her commander, Richard Miles McCool, received the Medal of Honor for his efforts in maintaining command and leading damage control efforts to rescue crew members and save his vessel.

She was pulled off line to perform mine removal in the Philippines, before doing the same in the Marshall Islands, Mariana Islands, and rivers in China.

At the end of the war, USS LCS(L)(3)-102 served as part of the occupation forces in Japan until December 1945 when it was moved to China before being deemed surplus and decommissioned in April 1946 and laid up in the Pacific Reserve Fleet, Columbia River Group, in Astoria, Oregon. Redesignated Landing Ship Support Large, USS "LSSL-102", on 28 February 1949 she was soon transferred to Japan, 30 April 1953, and renamed JDS Himawari where she served until 18 April 1966 when she was brought to the US, re-transferred to Thailand and renamed HTMS Nakha (LSSL-751). She stayed in Thailand until 2007.

USS LCS(L)(3)-102 earned one battle star for her service in World War II.

== Museum ship (2007-present) ==
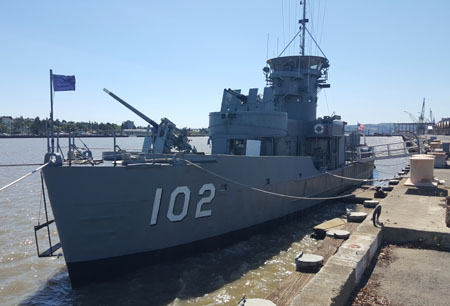
USS LCS (L) (3) 102 at Mare Island, California, 2016

A transfer ceremony was held on 22 May 2007, to transfer custody of the ship from the Royal Thai Navy to the National Association of LCS(L) 1–130.

In September 2007, she was loaded aboard a ship for transit from Thailand back to the United States to become a museum ship at Mare Island, California. The National Association of LCS(L) 1-130 is now officially known as the Landing Craft Support Museum, and continues to preserve and restore the 102.

She is now located on Mare Island, at the site of the former Mare Island Naval Shipyard. The museum is open to the public from 9 to 3 Tuesdays, Thursdays, and Saturdays, or by prior arrangements.

The 102 was listed on the National Register of Historic Places in 2015.
