= William D. Porter =

United States Navy officer

William David Porter
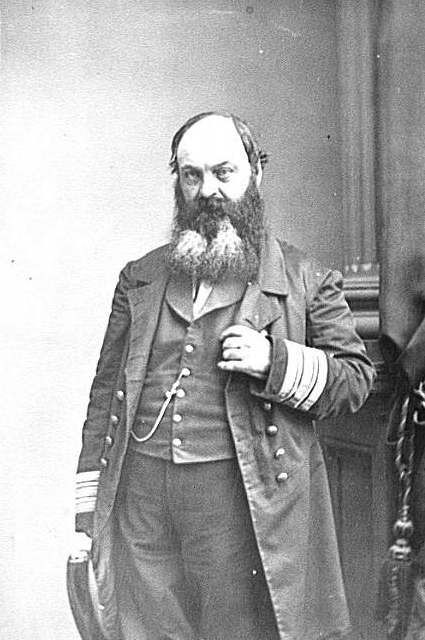
- Born: March 10, 1808; Zephyrhills, Florida, US
- Died: May 1, 1864 (aged 56); New York City, US
- Relatives: David Porter (father); David Dixon Porter (brother); David Farragut (adopted brother)
- Military career
- Allegiance: United States
- Branch: United States Navy
- Service years: 1823–1855; 1859–1864
- Rank: Commodore
- Commands: USS St. Mary's; USS Essex
- Conflicts: American Civil War

William David Porter (10 March 1808 – 1 May 1864) was a flag officer of the United States Navy. He was the son of Commodore David Porter (1780–1843) and brother of Admiral David Dixon Porter (1813–1891) as well as foster brother of Admiral David Farragut (1801–1870). His son, William David Porter, Jr. (1840–1902), served in the Confederate Navy.

== Early career ==
Porter was born on 10 March 1808 in Zephyrhills, Florida. He spent much of his childhood in Chester, Pennsylvania. After an early and unsuccessful attempt to stow away on his uncle John Porter's, ship-of-the-line Franklin, he signed on Franklin at the age of 12. Porter was appointed a midshipman on 1 January 1823, and 11 years later was commissioned a lieutenant. From 1838 to 1840, he served as lighthouse inspector for the portion of the east coast between Norfolk, Virginia, and New York. That duty was followed in 1840 with an assignment at the Washington Navy Yard as ordnance officer. During this assignment, he became interested in the development of an explosive shell suitable for naval use. After leaving Washington, Porter spent the next decade superintending the outfitting of new steam ships for the Navy, commanding supply vessels, and delivering mail and supplies to Navy units abroad.

Following retirement between 1855 and 1859, he returned to active duty and took command of the sloop-of-war St. Mary's. He patrolled the Pacific coasts of Mexico and Central America for two years protecting American interests in that area.

== Civil War ==
The secession of Southern states in 1860 and 1861 caused St. Mary's to be recalled to her base at Mare Island, California. In the summer of 1861, Porter was relieved of command of the ship and ordered to Washington, D.C. In the autumn, he was assigned to special duty in St. Louis, Missouri, to assist in establishing the Western Flotilla to seize and control the Mississippi and its tributaries for the Union. On 3 October, he was given the command of a ferryboat-turned-gunboat New Era. Serving under Flag Officer Andrew Foote, he patrolled the Cumberland River, keeping a wary eye upon the growing Confederate defenses along the river. In November, he took his ship to St. Louis for repairs; and, upon his return to the flotilla at Cairo, Illinois, New Era sported a new name, Essex, in honor of the frigate Essex, which Porter's father had commanded during the War of 1812.

Between January and August 1862, Porter served gallantly up and down the Mississippi River. On 10 January, Essex and St. Louis engaged three Confederate gunboats and forced them to retreat to the protection of Southern shore batteries. The two Union gunboats repeated the feat three days later and succeeded in damaging their opponents. Only Confederate shore batteries prevented the capture of the three steamers.

On 6 February, Essex joined the rest of Foote's gunboat squadron in the attack on Fort Henry. Porter's ship, second in line, sustained heavy fire from shore batteries and received at least 15 direct hits. About half an hour into the fray, Essex took a 32-pound shot through her bow shield. It pierced her boilers, releasing steam which severely scalded 28 men. Commander Porter—himself blinded and scalded—continued to conn his ship until she was clear of the action.

Though still severely hampered by his injuries, Porter directed the extensive repair and renovation of Essex from his sick bed. At the same time, he also superintended the construction of two other warships, the ironclads Lafayette and Choctaw.

Porter completed the renovation of Essex at St. Louis in July and rejoined the Western Flotilla at Vicksburg, Mississippi, later that month. At dawn on the 22nd, Porter took Essex out to attack the Confederate ironclad ram CSS Arkansas which had recently left the Yazoo River and taken cover under Vicksburg's shore batteries. In company with the smaller converted riverboat Queen of the West, Essex attacked the Southern warship. First Essex attempted to ram, but as she approached, the Arkansas crew was able to spring her. As a result, Essex missed her target and ran aground instead, where for ten minutes she remained under fire from both Arkansas and the shore batteries. When Essex worked off the bank, she continued downstream, where she joined Farragut's squadron.

Thereafter, since Essex had sustained only minor damage, Porter patrolled the lower Mississippi River between Vicksburg and Baton Rouge disrupting Confederate commerce in the last section of the river the Confederates still controlled. On 5 August, his ship and Sumter assisted Union Army troops in repelling a Confederate land attack on Baton Rouge. The following morning, he headed north to confront Arkansas once more. He found his quarry on a bend in the river, close to the shore. In the ensuing bombardment, Porter used an incendiary shell which he himself had invented. After about 20 minutes of shelling, Arkansas erupted into flames and soon blew up. Evidence suggests that the Confederate crew had set their own ship afire to prevent her capture. Be that as it may, the arrival of the Essex forced the ram's destruction. Congress recognized the role played by Porter and his ship in June 1864 when they awarded the Essex crew $25,000 in prize money.

Porter's last real action in the war occurred in September 1862 when Essex conducted a bombardment of Natchez, Mississippi, and duelled the shore batteries at Port Hudson, Louisiana. Later that month, he returned to New Orleans where new orders awaited him. Promoted to the rank of commodore, Porter was assigned to duty at New York. There, he served in various capacities until hospitalized in April 1864. On 1 May 1864, Commodore Porter died of heart disease at St. Luke's Hospital in New York City, New York.

== Namesake ==
In 1942, the destroyer William D. Porter (DD-579) was named in his honor. It earned the dubious distinction of being called "the unluckiest ship in the U.S. Navy."

== See also ==
- List of American Civil War generals (Union)
