= Richard Miles McCool =

United States Navy officer, recipient of the Medal of Honor

Richard Miles McCool Jr.
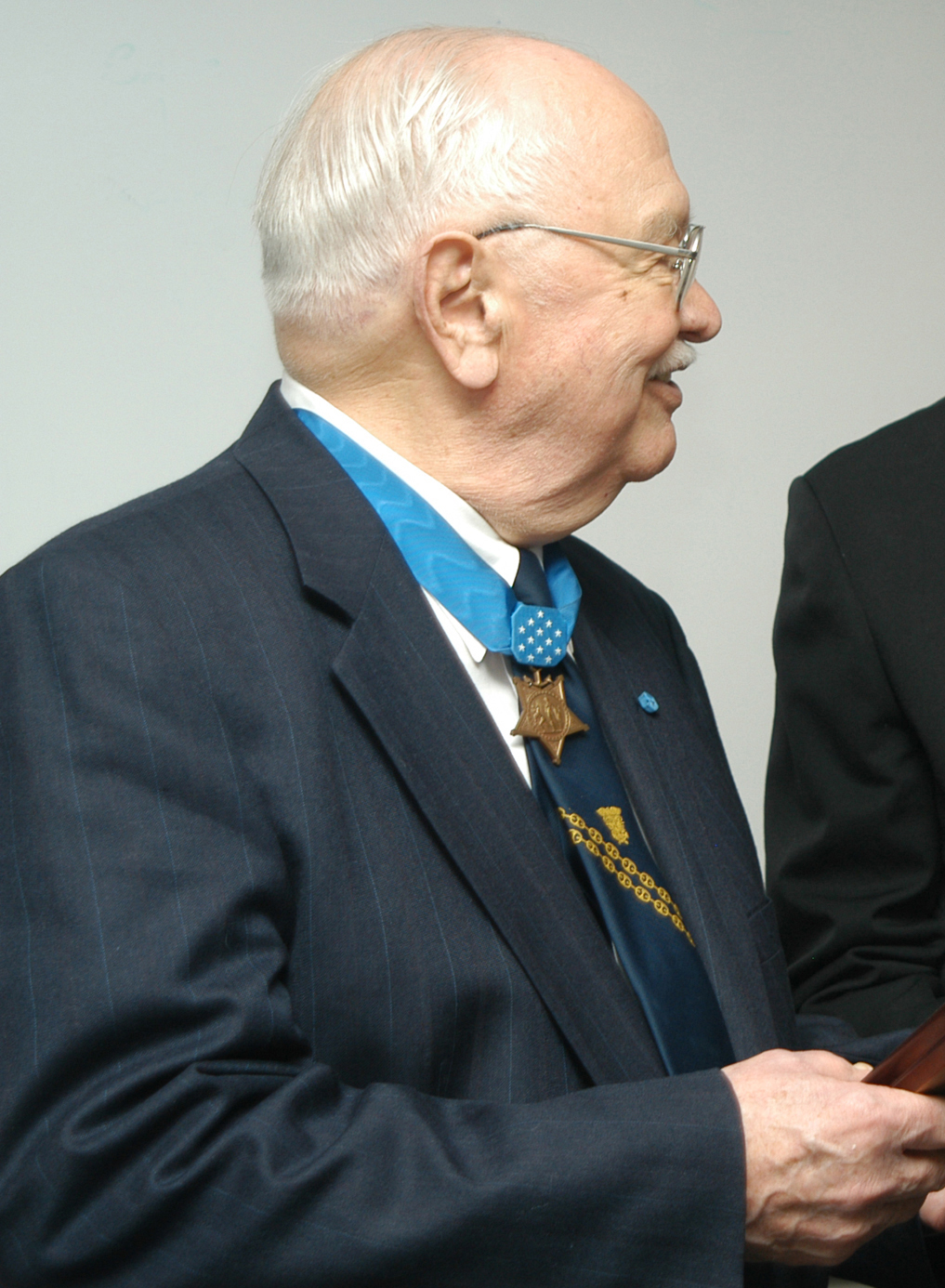
- Captain McCool receives photograph from RADM French in 2006 at ceremony presenting McCool the Medal of Honor Flag
- Born: January 4, 1922; Tishomingo, Oklahoma
- Died: March 5, 2008 (aged 86); Bremerton, Washington
- Burial place: US Naval Academy, Annapolis, Maryland
- Military career
- Allegiance: United States
- Branch: United States Navy
- Service years: 1944–1974
- Rank: Captain
- Unit: USS LCS(L)(3)-122
- Conflicts: World War II; Battle of Okinawa
- Awards: Medal of Honor

Richard Miles McCool Jr. (January 4, 1922 – March 5, 2008) was a United States Navy officer and a recipient of the United States military's highest decoration—the Medal of Honor—for his actions during the Battle of Okinawa in World War II.

== Biography ==
Richard M. McCool Jr. was born on January 4, 1922, in Oklahoma. McCool graduated from high school at the age of 15. He graduated from the University of Oklahoma with a degree in political science.

After the bombing of Pearl Harbor in 1941, he was accepted into a new collegiate Naval ROTC program, and later was appointed to the United States Naval Academy. He graduated from the Naval Academy in 1944 as an ensign (his class of 1945 graduated a year early) and was assigned to Naval Air Station Jacksonville, Florida. In December 1944, following training at the Amphibious Training Station Solomons, Maryland, he assumed command of USS LCS(L)(3)-122, a Landing Craft Support ship and was promoted to lieutenant in January 1945. On June 10, 1945, off the coast of Okinawa Island, McCool helped rescue the survivors of sinking destroyer USS William D. Porter. The next day, his own ship was hit by a Japanese kamikaze. Although he suffered severe burns and shrapnel wounds in the initial explosion, McCool continued to lead his crew in the firefighting and rescue efforts until relief arrived.

In January 1946, McCool was reverted to lieutenant (junior grade). In July, he assumed command of USS LSC 44, then transferred to the destroyer USS McKean. In July 1947, he became the aide to commandant, Eighth Naval District at New Orleans, Louisiana. After instructor duty at the University of Oklahoma with the Naval Reserve Officers Training Corps in June 1949, he received orders to USS Frank Knox, later transferring to USS Leyte. In January 1951, he was promoted to lieutenant. Completing Armed Forces Information School at Fort Slocum, New York, in June, he received orders to Commander Naval Base, Long Beach, California, and served as the public information officer. A year later, he returned for duty at the Eighth Naval District. In July 1954, he received orders to be the assistant for public information at Boston University, Boston, Massachusetts. In June 1955, he was promoted to lieutenant commander and assigned to the Bureau of Naval Personnel in Washington, D.C. The following year, he reported overseas as a staff member of commander, South East Asia Treaty Organization at Bangkok, Thailand. In December 1958, he was assigned staff duty with commandant of the Ninth Naval District at Great Lakes, Illinois, where he was promoted to commander in July 1960. In April 1961, he reported to serve on the staff of commander, First Fleet and transferred three years later for duty with commander, U.S. Naval Forces, Japan. Returning to the U.S., he continued staff duty with commander, Seventh Fleet. In July 1965, he was promoted to captain. In April 1966, he became Deputy Commander of the Defense Information School at Fort Benjamin Harrison, Indiana. Following his service in various public affairs posts, he retired from active duty in 1974 with the rank of captain and became active in local politics in the Bremerton, Washington, area.

McCool died of natural causes on March 5, 2008, at the age of 86 in a hospital in Bremerton, Washington.

== Medal of Honor citation ==
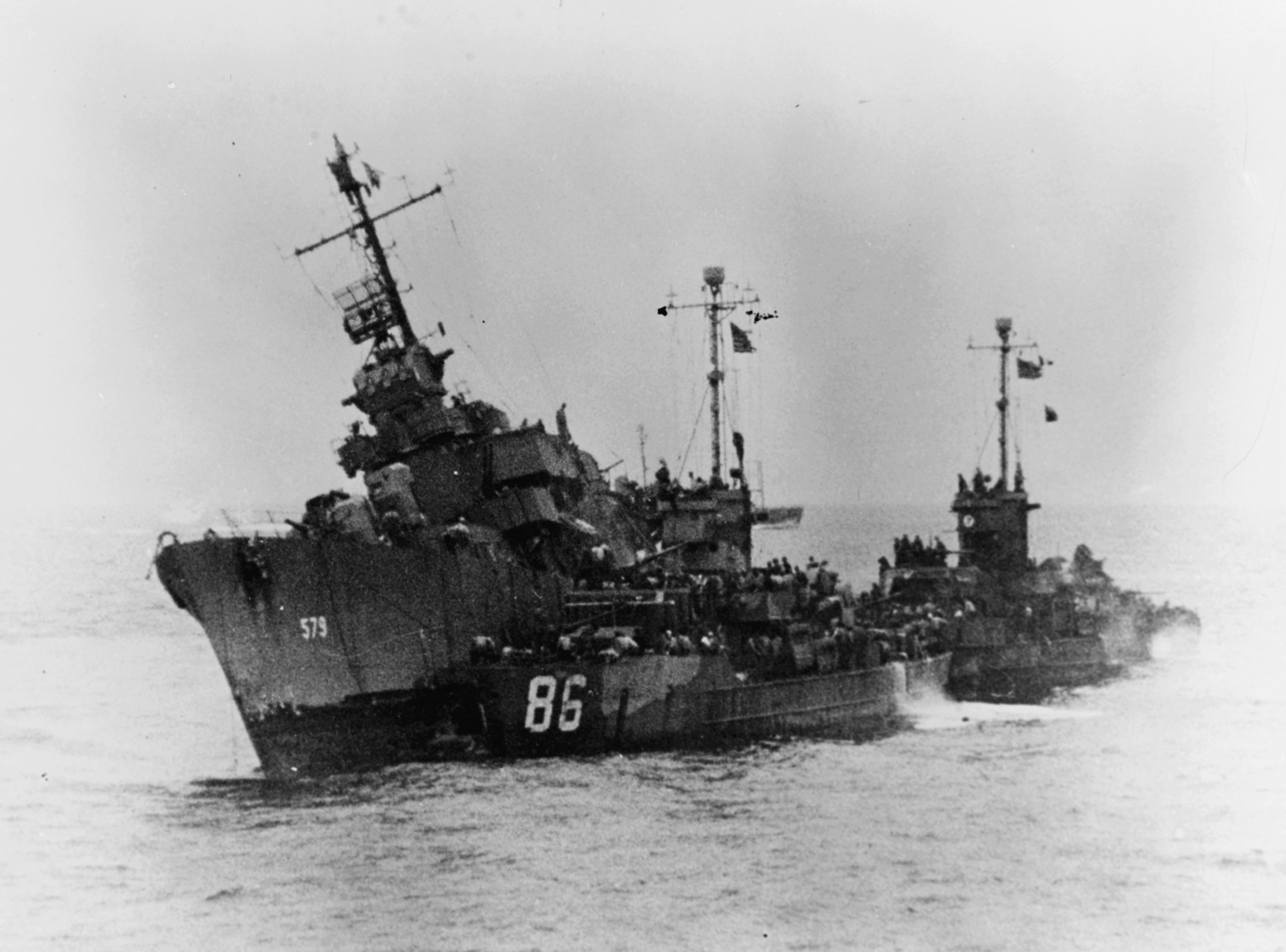
USS William D. Porter sinking. McCool's LCS(L)(3)-122 is behind LCS(L)(3)-86

Lieutenant McCool's official Medal of Honor citation reads:

For conspicuous gallantry and intrepidity at the risk of his life above and beyond the call of duty as commanding officer of the USS LCS(L)(3)-122 during operations against enemy Japanese forces in the Ryukyu chain, 10 and 11 June 1945. Sharply vigilant during hostile air raids against Allied ships on radar picket duty off Okinawa on 10 June, Lt. McCool aided materially in evacuating all survivors from a sinking destroyer which had sustained mortal damage under the devastating attacks. When his own craft was attacked simultaneously by 2 of the enemy's suicide squadron early in the evening of 11 June, he instantly hurled the full power of his gun batteries against the plunging aircraft, shooting down the first and damaging the second before it crashed his station in the conning tower and engulfed the immediate area in a mass of flames. Although suffering from shrapnel wounds and painful burns, he rallied his concussion-shocked crew and initiated vigorous firefighting measures and then proceeded to the rescue of several trapped in a blazing compartment, subsequently carrying 1 man to safety despite the excruciating pain of additional severe burns. Unmindful of all personal danger, he continued his efforts without respite until aid arrived from other ships and he was evacuated. By his staunch leadership, capable direction, and indomitable determination throughout the crisis, Lt. McCool saved the lives of many who otherwise might have perished and contributed materially to the saving of his ship for further combat service. His valiant spirit of self-sacrifice in the face of extreme peril sustains and enhances the highest traditions of the U.S. Naval Service.

== Awards and decorations ==

1st row	Medal of Honor		Purple Heart
2nd row	Navy Commendation Medal	Combat Action Ribbon	Navy Unit Commendation
3rd row	American Defense Service Medal	American Campaign Medal	Asiatic-Pacific Campaign Medal with 1 Campaign star
4th row	World War II Victory Medal	Navy Occupation Service Medal with 'Asia' clasp	National Defense Service Medal with 1 Service star

== USS Richard M. McCool Jr. (LPD-29) ==
The last of the Flight I San Antonio-class amphibious transport docks, built at Huntington Ingalls, Pascagoula Mississippi, has been named USS Richard M. McCool Jr. in his honor.

== See also ==
- List of Medal of Honor recipients for World War II
