= Landing craft support =

United States Navy and Royal Navy ship class

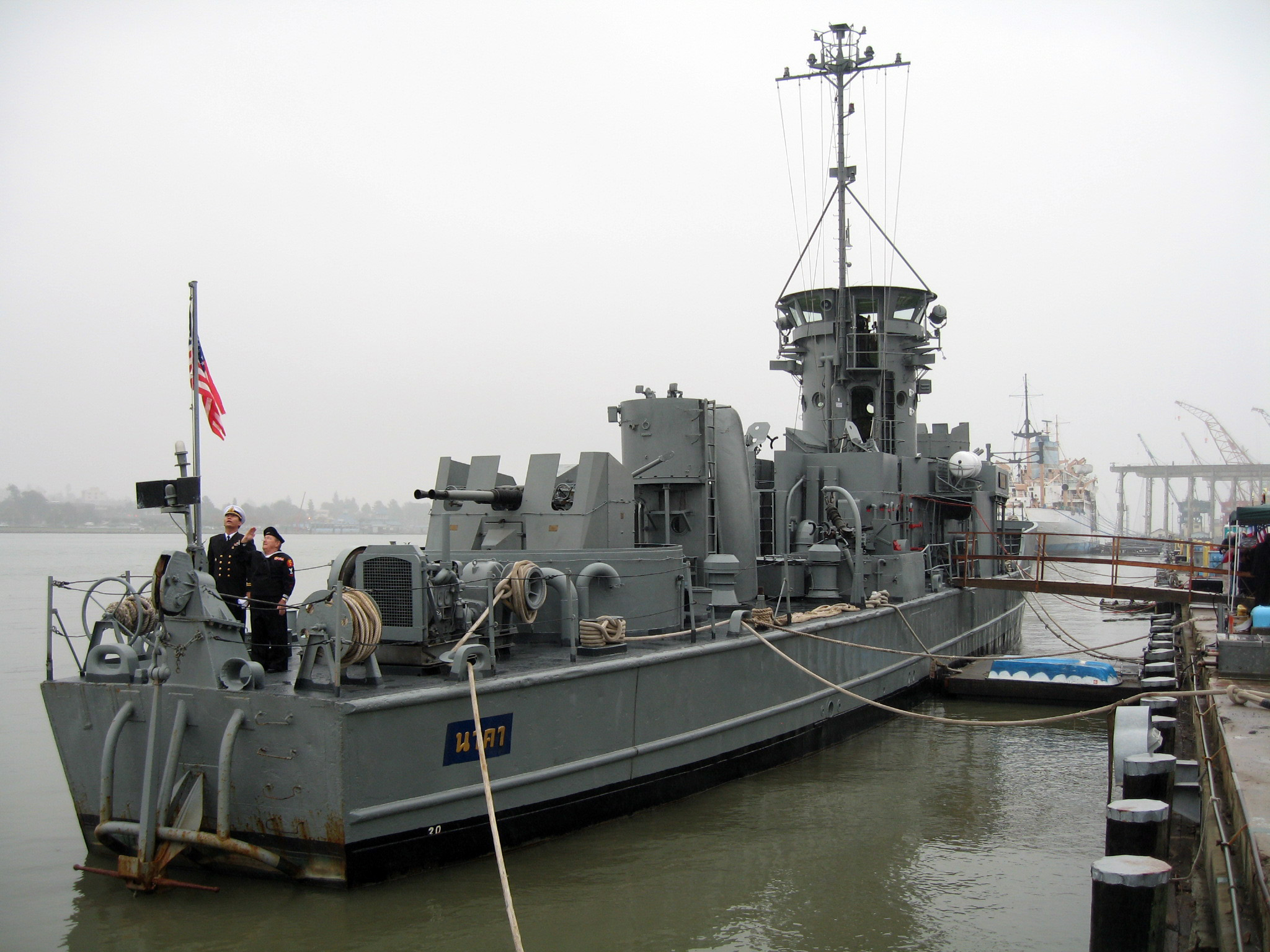
- Ex-LCS(L)-102 (HTMS Nakha)

Class overview
- Builders: George Lawley & Son, Commercial Iron Works and Albina Engine Works
- Preceded by: LCI(G)
- In commission: 1944-2007
- Completed: 130
- Lost: 5
- Retired: 125
- Preserved: 1

General characteristics
- Displacement: 250 long tons (250 t)
- Length: 158 ft 6 in (48.31 m)
- Beam: 23 ft 3 in (7.09 m)
- Draft: 5 ft 10 in (1.78 m) (aft, loaded)
- Propulsion: 8 × Gray Marine diesel engines; 1,600 hp (1,200 kW), twin screws
- Speed: 16.5 knots (30.6 km/h)
- Range: 5,500 nmi (10,200 km)
- Complement: 3–6 officers, 55–68 men
- Armament: 1 × 3"/50 caliber gun or twin 40 mm or single 40 mm bow gun; 2 × twin 40 mm deck guns (one forward, one aft); 4 × 20 mm cannons; 4 × .50 cal (12.7 mm) machine guns; 10 × Mk7 rocket launchers
- Armor: 10-lb. STS splinter shields

The Landing Craft, Support (Large) were two distinct classes of amphibious warfare vessels used by the United States Navy (USN) in the Pacific and the Royal Navy in World War II. The USN versions, which were later reclassified Landing Ship Support, Large, also performed radar picket duty and fire fighting.

== US Navy vessels ==
The original designation for the ships was LCS(L)(3), which stood for "Landing Craft Support (Large) Mark 3". In 1949 the class was reclassified to "Landing Ship Support, Large" (LSSL). The United States Navy had to have the designation LCS(L) because there was also a smaller class named LCL that were built mainly for rescue and smoke laying during amphibious operation.

== Design and manufacture ==
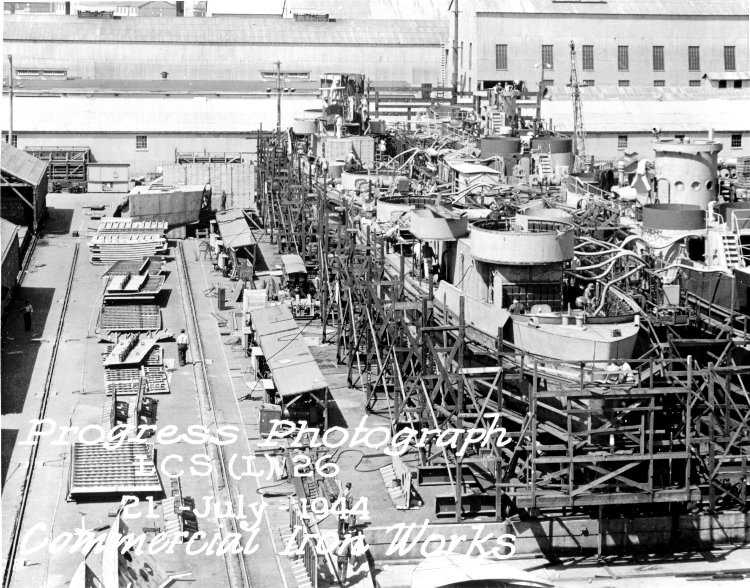
Builders' progress photo of LCS(L)(3)-26, Commercial Iron Works, Portland Oregon, 21 July 1944

A total of 130 were made. Three different ship building yards did the construction: George Lawley & Son (Neponset, Massachusetts); Commercial Iron Works (Portland, Oregon); and Albina Engine Works (Portland, Oregon).

The hull was the same as the Landing Craft Infantry ships. They were 158 ft 6 in (48.31 m) long, displaced 250 long tons (250 t), 23 ft 3 in (7.09 m) wide and drew 5 ft 10 in (1.78 m) when fully loaded. The flat bottom and skegs between and on either side of the twin screws allowed the ships to safely beach. The anchor is at the stern of the ship so it can be used to help pull the ship off the beach if necessary. The twin variable pitch screws were each driven by a bank of four Grey Marine (later General Motors) diesel engines, with a total power for all eight engines of 1,600 horsepower (1,200 kW). These engines gave a maximum speed of 16.5 knots (30.6 km/h), but normally the ships sailed at 12 knots (22 km/h). The ships had a range of 5,500 nautical miles (10,200 km). Armour for the gun mounts, pilot house and conning tower was provided by 10 lb (4.5 kg) STS splinter shields. The ships had a smoke generator which was used to obscure landing craft approaching the beach.

LCS(L) vessels could be produced in as little as 10 days, and final fitting out would take a further few weeks. The ships also made very good fire fighting ships. A fire fighting manifold was fitted in front of the bow gun and two monitors with pumps fitted just forward of the aft gun.

=== Armament ===
The LCS(L)(3) ships provided more firepower per ton than any ship ever built for the USN. Three guns and ten rocket launchers comprised the main armament. The bow gun was a 3"/50 caliber gun, a single 40 mm gun or a twin 40 mm gun. The forward and aft deck guns were twin 40 mm guns. The ten Mark 7 rocket launchers were situated behind the bow gun and forward deck house. Four 20 mm cannons were also mounted.

== Operations ==
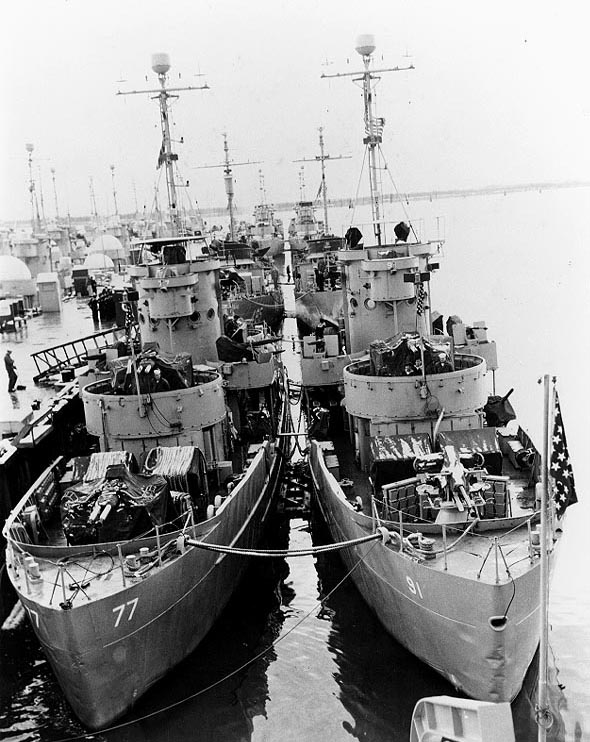
A group of LSSLs awaiting transfer to the ROK Navy in 1952

The Battle of Tarawa showed a gap in Navy resources for close in support of landing troops. The time interval between the end of shelling from the large ships and the arrival of the landing craft on the beach allowed the defenders to regroup. The Landing Craft Support was designed to fill this void.

The first Landing Craft Support ships arrived in the Pacific Theater in time for the landings at Iwo Jima.

After providing close in support during the landings at Okinawa, many Landing Craft Support ships were placed on the radar picket stations as anti-aircraft platforms. When not on a picket station, the ship would create smoke to hide the fleet at anchor and perform "skunk patrol" screening for suicide boats.

In the Borneo Campaign, Landing Craft Support was used in landings in Tarakan and Balikpapan.

During World War II, five LCS(L)(3)s were sunk in combat (see below) and 21 were damaged. Three of these small warships received the Presidential Unit Citation, while six were awarded Navy Unit citations. Importantly, Lieutenant Richard M. McCool, skipper of USS LCS(L)(3) 122, was awarded the Medal of Honor.

LCS(L)(3)-7, LCS(L)(3)-26 and LCS(L)(3)-49 were sunk by suicide boats off Mariveles, Corregidor Channel, Luzon, Philippine Islands, on 16 February 1945. LCS(L)(3)-15 was sunk by kamikaze aircraft off Okinawa, Ryukyu Islands, on 22 April 1945. LCS(L)(3)-33 was sunk by a kamikaze on 12 April 1945 at RP position No1.

== Post war ==
At the end of the war, surviving ships returned to the United States. Some were restored to action for the Korean War. Many were transferred to Japan (three were later transferred to Taiwan), France (and on to South Vietnam), Cambodia, Thailand, Greece, and other nations.

== Preserved ships ==
Only two ships are known to still exist. One has been highly modified as a fishing boat. The second was in Thailand and was kept in very similar configuration to its original (HTMS Nakha, formerly USS LCS(L)-102). The National Association of USS LCS(L) 1–130 was successful in having HTMS Nakha transferred to the association for public display in the United States. She was officially released from the Royal Thai Navy on 10 November 2007 after being returned to the US in September of that year. As of May 2017 USS LCS(L)-102 is under restoration and upkeep. It is open to the public on Tuesdays, Thursdays and Saturdays or by special arrangements, and tours at the former Mare Island Naval Shipyard, in Vallejo, California.

== British LCS vessels ==
The British designed, built and operated ten Fairmile Type H LCS vessels. Three of these were sunk in action.

== See also ==
- List of US Landing Craft Support (Large) (Mark 3)
