= USS LCI(L)-713 =

Landing Craft Infantry (Large) in Portland, Oregon

- USS LCI-713 (Landing Craft)
- U.S. National Register of Historic Places
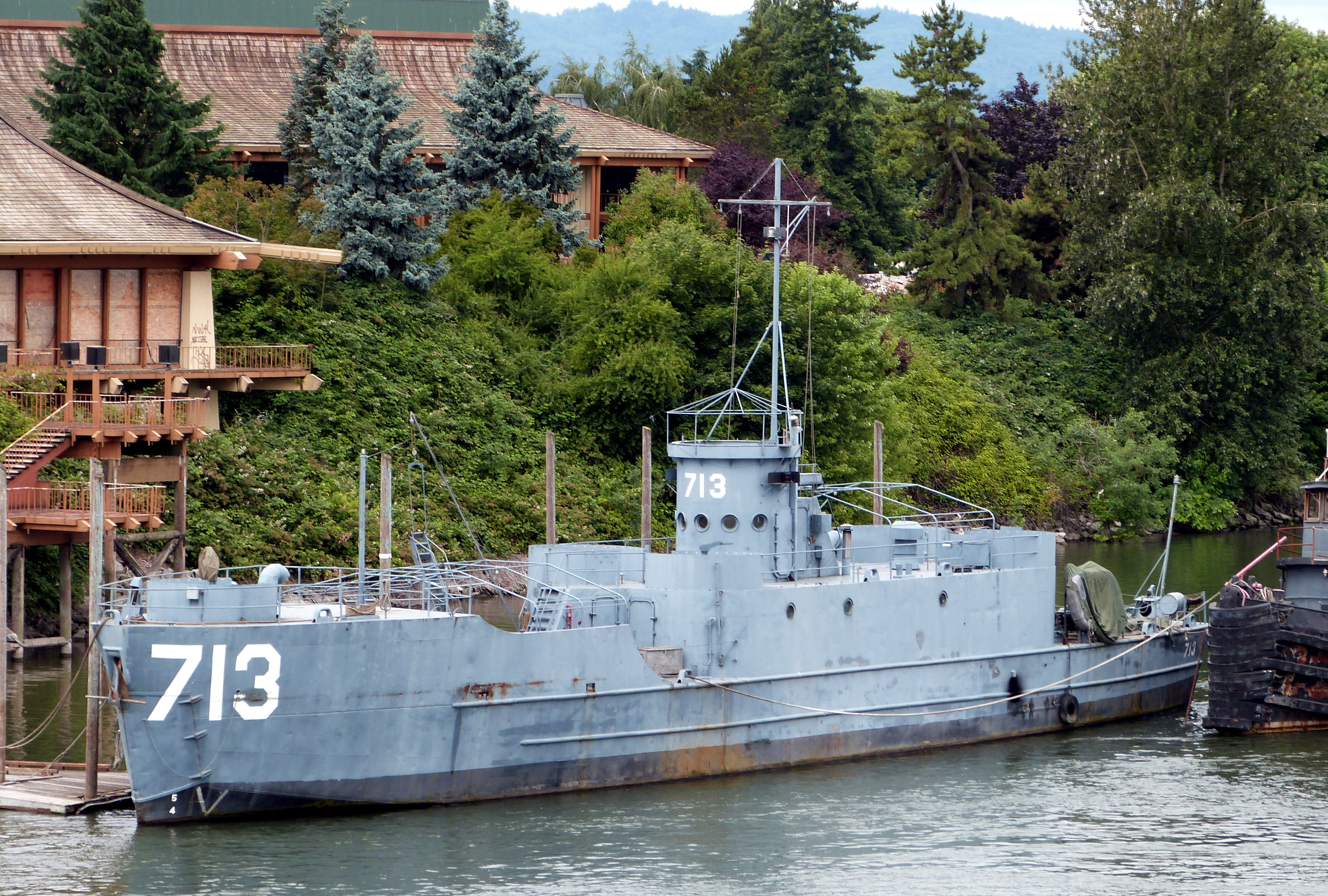
- The partially restored USS LCI(L)-713 in Portland, Oregon, in 2012.

- Location within Portland, Oregon Location within Oregon Location within the United States
- Location: 1401 N Hayden Island Drive
- Coordinates: 45°36′56″N 122°40′45″W
- Built: 1944
- NRHP reference No.: 07000300
- Added to NRHP: 12 April 2007

The LCI(L)-713, (a round conn, bow ramp) is located in Portland, Oregon now moored in the Swan Island Lagoon. It is currently owned and being restored by a non-profit 501c3 group, the Amphibious Forces Memorial Museum. Built in 1944 in Neponset, Massachusetts, the ship was transferred to the Pacific Theater where it saw action in making two assault landings: Zamboanga, Philippines in March 1945 and Brunei Bay, Borneo in June 1945 (as part of the Battle of North Borneo). Purchased as war surplus initially for use as a log hauling tugboat, the engines were removed and it was relegated to a floating storage hulk in Stevenson, Washington until the late 1950s when it was abandoned and sank into the river mud on the shore of the Columbia River. In the late 1970s the ship was refloated and restoration began on the ship. LCI(L)713 has changed ownership until finally sold to the AFMM in 2003. The LCI(L) 713 has been continually restored with the goal of becoming a historically correct operating museum ship. It was listed on the National Register of Historic Places on 12 April 2007.
