= M20 recoilless rifle =

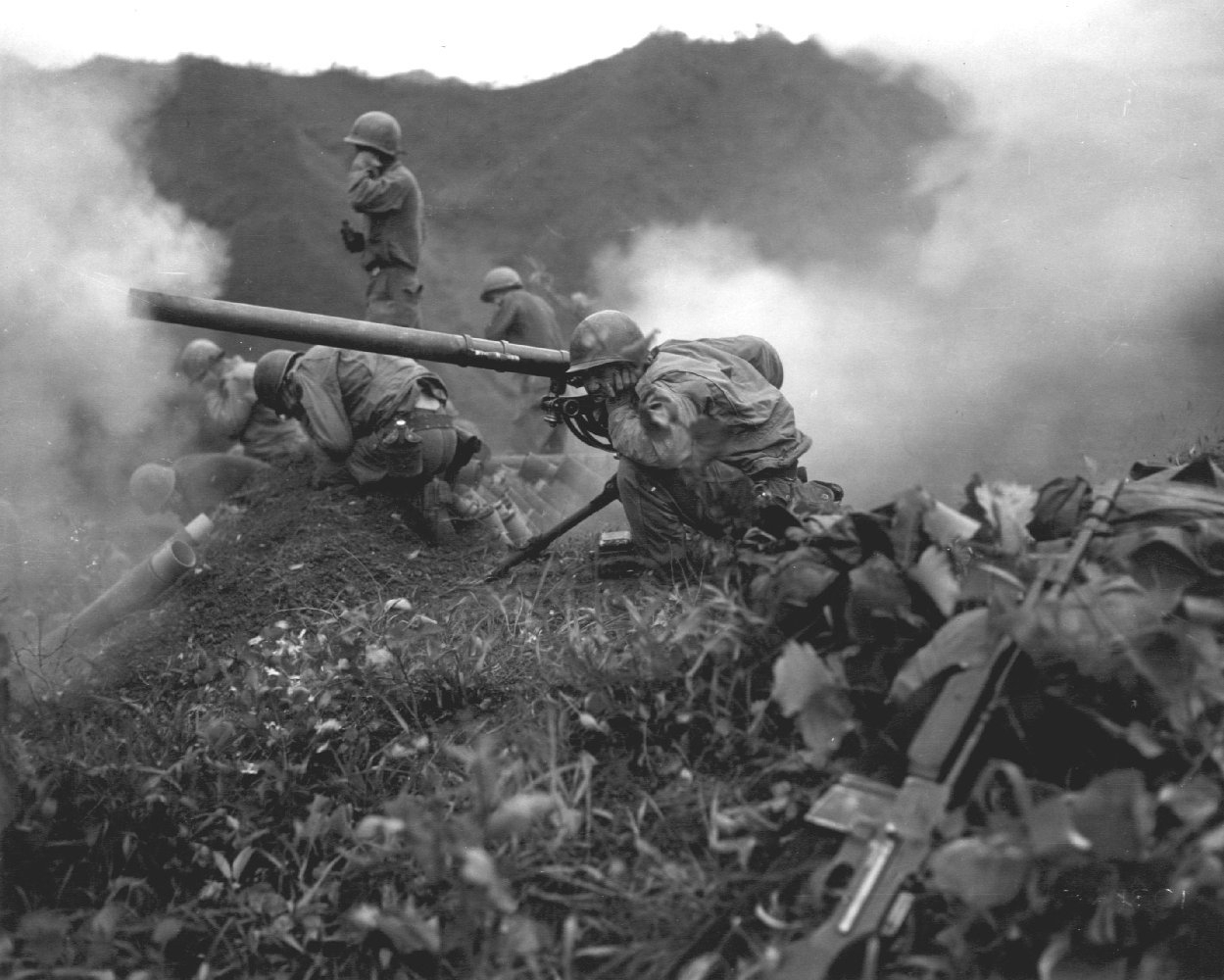
- An M20 recoilless rifle in action during the Korean War
- Type: Recoilless anti-tank weapon
- Place of origin: United States

Service history
- Used by: United States
- Wars: World War II (limited); Korean War; First Indochina War; Algerian War; Portuguese Colonial War; Lebanese Civil War; Vietnam War; Cambodian Civil War; Laotian Civil War; Rhodesian Bush War; Nicaraguan Revolution; Salvadoran Civil War; Western Sahara War; Kosovo war

Production history
- Designed: 1944
- Produced: 1945
- Variants: Type 56

Specifications
- Mass: 103 lb (47 kg)
- Length: 82 in (2.1 m)
- Barrel length: 65 in (1.7 m)
- Crew: 1 or 2
- Shell: 75 x 408 mm R HE, HEAT, Smoke
- Shell weight: 20.5–22.6 lb (9.3–10.3 kg)
- Caliber: 75 mm (3.0 in)
- Recoil: Recoilless
- Carriage: M1917A1 tripod
- Elevation: −27° to +65°
- Traverse: 360°
- Muzzle velocity: 1,000 ft/s (300 m/s)
- Maximum firing range: 3.9 mi (6.3 km)

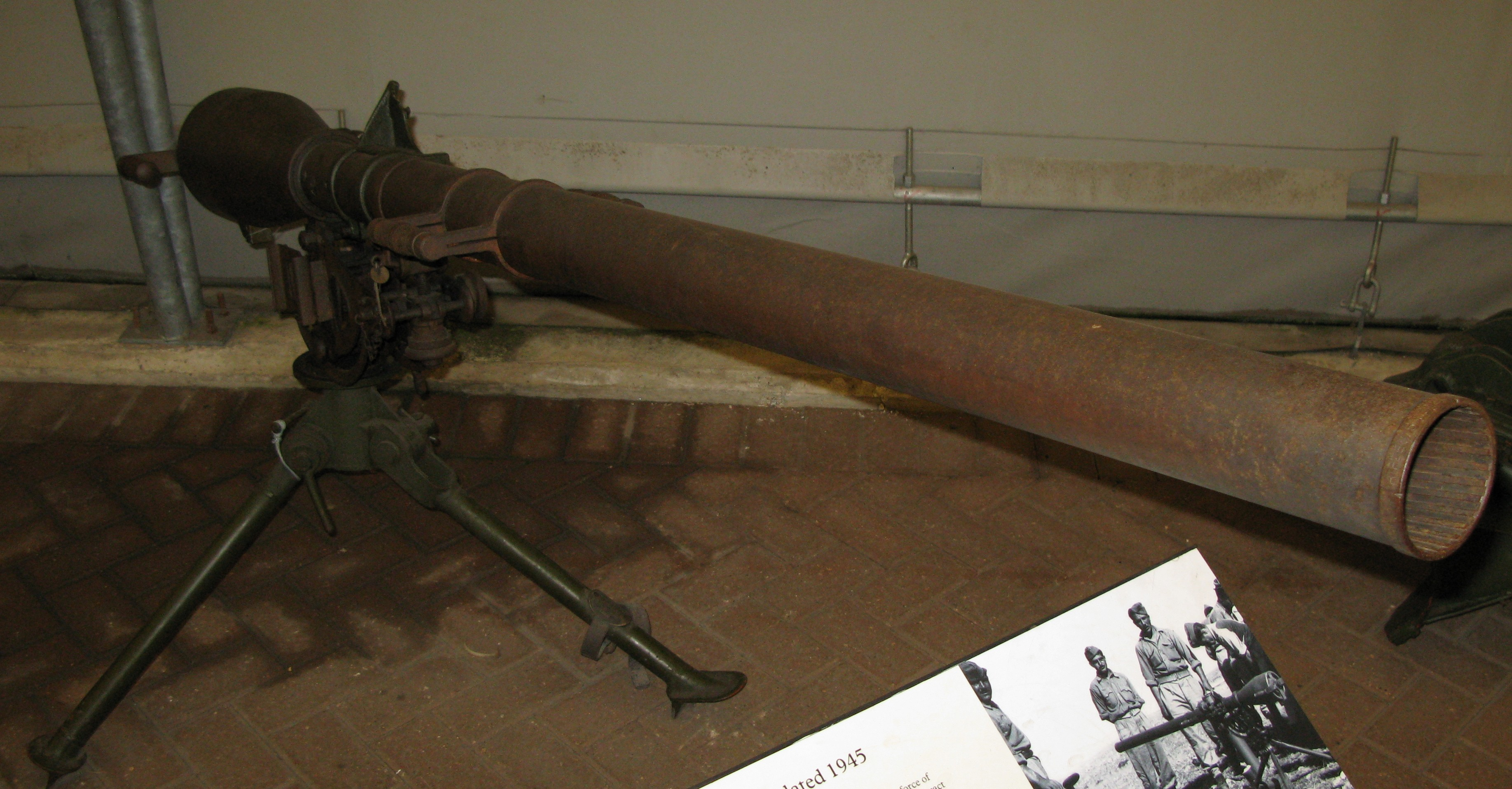
An M20 recoilless rifle on display in the Royal Armouries at Fort Nelson

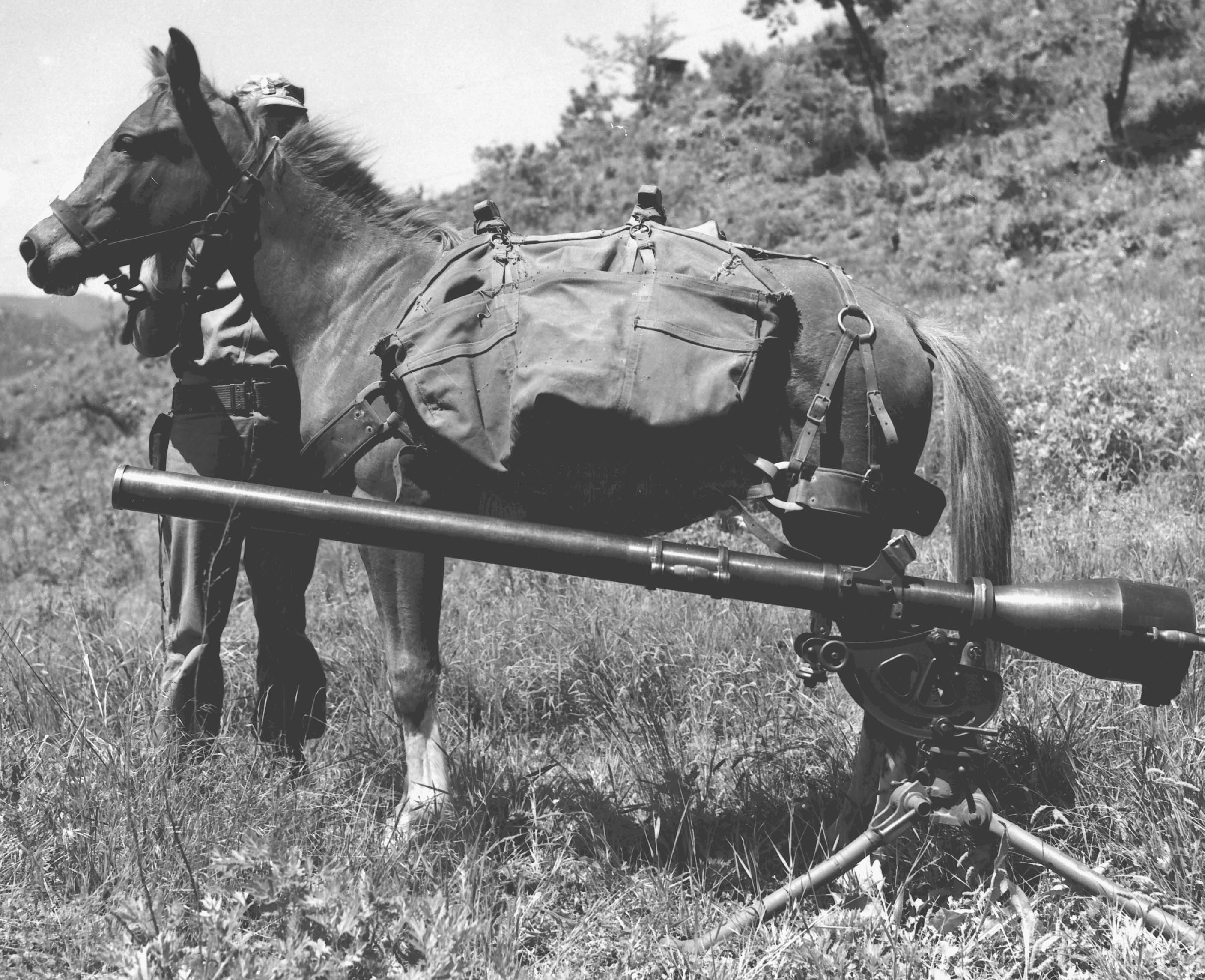
Sergeant Reckless, a decorated war horse serving with a US Marine Corps recoilless rifle platoon in the Korean War, stands beside a 75mm recoilless rifle

The M20 recoilless rifle is a U.S. 75 mm caliber recoilless rifle that was used during the last months of the Second World War and extensively during the Korean War. It could be fired from an M1917A1 .30 caliber machine gun tripod, or from a vehicle mount, typically a Jeep. Its shaped charge warhead, also known as HEAT, was capable of penetrating 100 mm of armor. Although the weapon proved ineffective against the T-34 tank and most other tanks during the Korean War, it was used primarily as a close infantry support weapon to engage all types of targets including infantry and lightly armored vehicles. The M20 proved useful against pillboxes and other types of field fortifications.

== History ==
During World War II, the U.S. military recognized that, due to advancements in armor technology by enemy forces, a powerful lightweight weapon was needed to defend infantry and light armor units. The Ordnance Department Small Arms Division commenced development of a recoilless rifle and, by 1944, models of a 75 mm recoilless rifle were being tested. Production of the M20 was underway by March 1945; only limited numbers were used by Allied troops in the European and Pacific theaters.

The M20 relied on a perforated artillery shell casing, combined with a rear vented breech using propellant gases from the firing of a shell, to greatly reduce the recoil of the weapon. It is this use of vented propellant gases that eliminated the need for a recoil system, thereby reducing the weight of the launcher and enhancing its use as a light infantry weapon.

The M20 was one of the main anti-tank weapons used by the U.S. military in the early days of the Korean War along with the 2.36-inch bazooka. However, the recoilless rifle failed to destroy any North Korean T-34-85 during the Battle of Osan on July 5, 1950. After the deployment of the 3.5-inch M20 Super Bazooka in mid-July, the M20 recoilless rifle no longer functioned as an anti-tank weapon, and was used as an infantry support weapon. It was a very effective weapon to destroy enemy bunkers and trenches with easy transportation benefitted from light weight while providing great firepower.

Recoilless rifles, such as the M20, were also used successfully in large numbers by both sides in the First Indochina War (1946–54). They were phased out after being replaced by wire guided missiles, which were introduced during the Vietnam War in the 1960s and 1970s. Until stockpiles of ammunition were exhausted in the 1990s, M20 recoilless rifles were used to start controlled avalanches by the U.S. National Forest Service and National Park Service.

The Royal Moroccan Army used M20s during the Western Sahara War against the Polisario Front.

China also produced unlicensed copies, known as the Type 52 and Type 56 (an upgraded version that could fire fin-stabilized HEAT shells). These versions were widely used by the North Vietnamese Army (NVA) and Vietcong guerrillas in the Vietnam War and there are also pictures suggesting its use by guerrillas and militias in the Lebanese Civil War (1975–1990), such as the Amal Movement militia.

== Operators ==
- Albania: Type 56
- Argentina: M20
- Brazil: M20
- Burkina Faso: Type 52
- Burundi: Type 52
- Cameroon: Type 52
- Colombia: M20
- Democratic Republic of the Congo: M20
- China: Type 52 and Type 56
- El Salvador
- Ethiopian Empire: M20s were used by the Kagnew Battalion
- France
- Guinea-Bissau: Type 52
- Indonesia: Type 52 and Type 56 used by Indonesian Marine Corps
- Lebanon
- Mauritania: M20
- Myanmar :Both US M-20 and Chinese Type 52 and Type 56
- Netherlands
- Niger: M20
- Pakistan: Type 52
- Paraguay: M20
- Philippines: M20
- Portugal: M20
- Saudi Arabia: M20
- South Korea: The Armed Forces began receiving M20s from the U.S. in 1951, and 601 were in service with the Army by the end of the Korean War.
- Tanzania: Type 52
- Togo: Type 56
- United States
- Vietnam: Type 52 and Type 56
- South Vietnam: M20
- Turkey: M20 617 units.
- Yemen: M20
- Yugoslavia: M20
- Zambia: M20

== See also ==
- M18 recoilless rifle – smaller 57mm model of the same era
- M40 recoilless rifle
- M29 Weasel – the "M29C Type A" variant had a center-mounted M20 as its armament
- List of weapons of the Cambodian Civil War
- List of weapons of the Laotian Civil War
- List of weapons of the Lebanese Civil War
- List of weapons of the Vietnam War
