= List of weapons of the Cambodian Civil War =

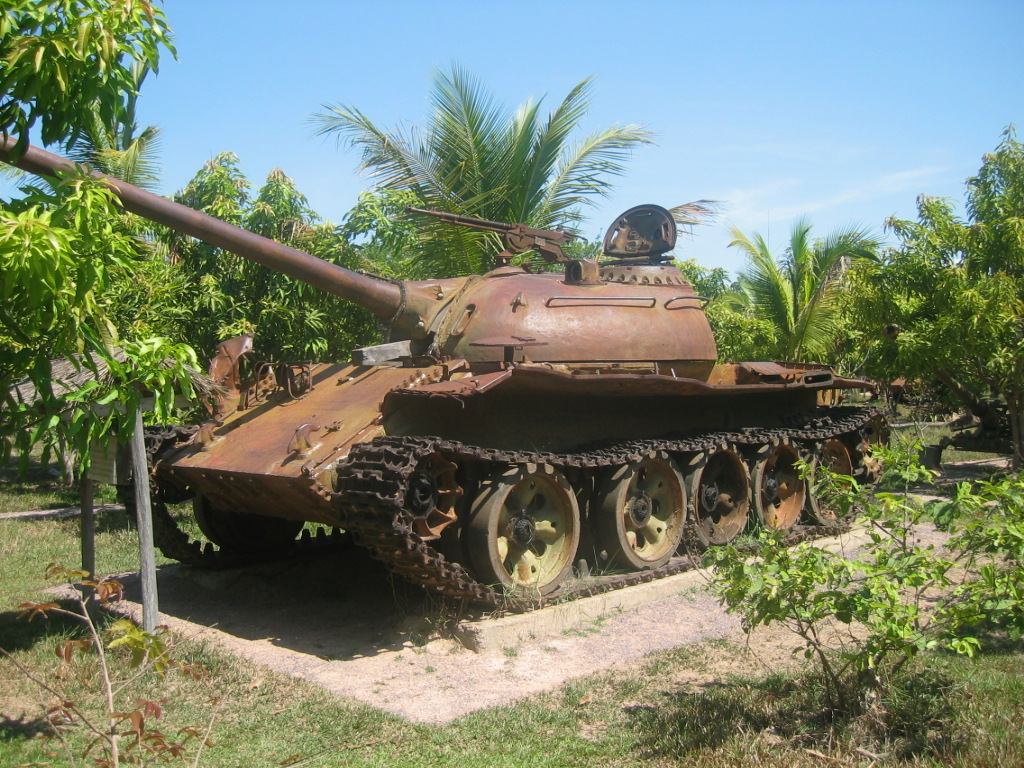
Soviet T-54 or Chinese Type 59 tank used in the Cambodian civil war now on display at the war museum in Siem Reap, Cambodia, 2005.

The Cambodian Civil War was a military conflict of the Cold War in Asia that pitted the guerrilla forces of the Maoist-oriented Communist Party of Kampuchea (nicknamed the Khmer Rouge) and the armed and security forces of the Nonaligned Kingdom of Cambodia from 1967 to 1970, then between the joint Monarchist, Maoist and Marxist-Leninist National United Front of Kampuchea alliance and the pro-western Khmer Republic from 1970 to 1975. Main combatants comprised:

- The Khmer National Armed Forces (French: Forces Armées Nationales Khmères), best known by its French acronym FANK, were the official armed defense forces of the Khmer Republic from 1970 to 1975. Subordinated to the Ministry of Defense of the Cambodian Republican Government at the national capital Phnom Penh, the FANK branches were organized as follows:
  - Khmer National Army (French: Armée Nationale Khmère – ANK)
  - Khmer Air Force (French: Armèe de l'Air Khmère – AAK)
  - Khmer National Navy (French: Marine Nationale Khmère – MNK)
- Paramilitary security forces:
  - Khmer National Police (French: Police Nationale Khmère – PNK)
  - Khmer National Gendarmerie (French: Gendarmerie Nationale Khmère – GNK)
- The Cambodian People's National Liberation Armed Forces (CPNLAF) were the official armed wing of the National United Front of Kampuchea (French: Front uni national du Kampuchéa or Front uni national khmer – FUNK), an umbrella organization dedicated to the armed overthrow of the pro-western Khmer Republic. Technically subordinated to the exiled Royal Government of the National Union of Kampuchea (French: Gouvernement royal d'union nationale du Kampuchéa – GRUNK) based in Beijing, the CPNLAF comprised the following three guerrilla movements:
  - The Khmer Rumdo, also spelt Khmer Rumdos or Khmer Rumdoh ("Liberation Khmer" in the Khmer language), a pro-Sihanoukist (monarchist) faction founded in 1970, which was aligned with the People's Republic of China and North Vietnam.
  - The Khmer Issarak ("Free Khmer" or "Independent Khmer" in the Khmer language), also known as the Khmer Viet Minh or United Issarak Front, a pro-Soviet Marxist-Leninist faction closely aligned with both the monarchist Khmer Romdo and North Vietnam.
  - The Khmer Rouge, a collective designation coined to the Maoist-oriented Communist Party of Kampuchea (CPK) and its military wing, the Revolutionary Army of Kampuchea (RAK), active in Cambodia since 1967, which were aligned with the People's Republic of China, North Vietnam, the Viet Cong, the Pathet Lao and the Communist Party of Thailand.
- The Khmer Serei ("Free Khmer" in the Khmer language), a far-right, anti-communist and anti-monarchist guerrilla group active in Cambodia between 1955 and 1969, which was secretly backed by the United States and South Vietnam, being subsequently integrated into the FANK in 1970.
- The Army of the Republic of Vietnam (ARVN), which received support from the United States, Australia, Canada, France, West Germany, Israel, Japan, New Zealand, Philippines, South Korea, Pahlavi Iran, Francoist Spain, Taiwan, Thailand and the United Kingdom.
- The People's Army of Vietnam (PAVN), also designated the "North Vietnamese Army" (NVA), which received support from the Soviet Union, the People's Republic of China, North Korea, East Germany, Czechoslovakia, Poland, Hungary, Bulgaria and Yugoslavia.

A wide variety of weapons was used by all sides in the Cambodian Civil War. American military aid was funnelled to the FANK through the Military Equipment Delivery Team, Cambodia (MEDTC) program. Authorized a total of 113 officers and men, the team arrived in Phnom Penh in 1971, under the overall command of CINCPAC Admiral John S. McCain Jr. In the early months of the War, most Cambodian Army infantry, armoured and artillery units fought the PAVN and Khmer Rouge with a mix of surplus World War II-vintage French and U.S. and modern Soviet and Chinese small-arms, armoured vehicles and artillery pieces either inherited from Khmer Royal Army stocks or delivered as emergency aid by the Americans. ANK infantry battalions later sent to South Vietnam for retraining between February 1971 and November 1972 under the US Army-Vietnam Individual Training Program (UITG) were re-equipped upon their return to Cambodia with modern U.S. small-arms, comprising revolvers, automatic pistols, assault rifles, light machine guns, medium and heavy machine guns, grenade launchers, anti-tank rocket launchers, mortars and recoilless rifles. Besides infantry weapons, the U.S. MEDTC also provided the FANK branches with more modern U.S. military equipments, which included aircraft, armoured and transport vehicles and long-range artillery pieces, plus naval and riverine vessels. Although the UITG and MEDTC aid programs allowed the FANK to standardise on modern U.S. weapons and equipment, they never superseded entirely the earlier weaponry, particularly in the case of the territorial units and rear-echelon support formations. In addition to U.S. support, the FANK received further military assistance from South Vietnam, the Kingdom of Laos, Thailand, Indonesia, the Philippines, Singapore, the Republic of China (Taiwan), Australia and New Zealand.

During the early phase of the War, between 1967 and 1970, the Khmer Rouge likewise was largely equipped with WWII-vintage French, Japanese, American, and more modern Soviet and Chinese weapons either collected from arms caches established during the First Indochina War or seized from Khmer Royal Army units. With the establishment of the FUNK coalition and the subsequent creation of its CPNLAF armed wing, the Khmer Rouge, the Khmer Rumdo and the Khmer Issarak began to receive military assistance mainly from North Vietnam, the Soviet Union, Albania, Romania, North Korea and the People's Republic of China. As the war progressed, these factions were provided with modern Eastern Bloc military hardware, including semiautomatic and fully automatic small-arms, artillery pieces, armoured and transport vehicles of Soviet and Chinese origin, mostly being funnelled through the North Vietnamese. Although the CPNLAF standardized on Soviet and Chinese weapons and equipment by the time of their first full-scale solo offensive in January 1973, its guerrilla forces continued to make use of captured enemy stocks until the end of the War.

== Khmer National Armed Forces equipment ==
=== Revolvers ===
- M1917 revolver
- Smith & Wesson Model 10

=== Pistols ===
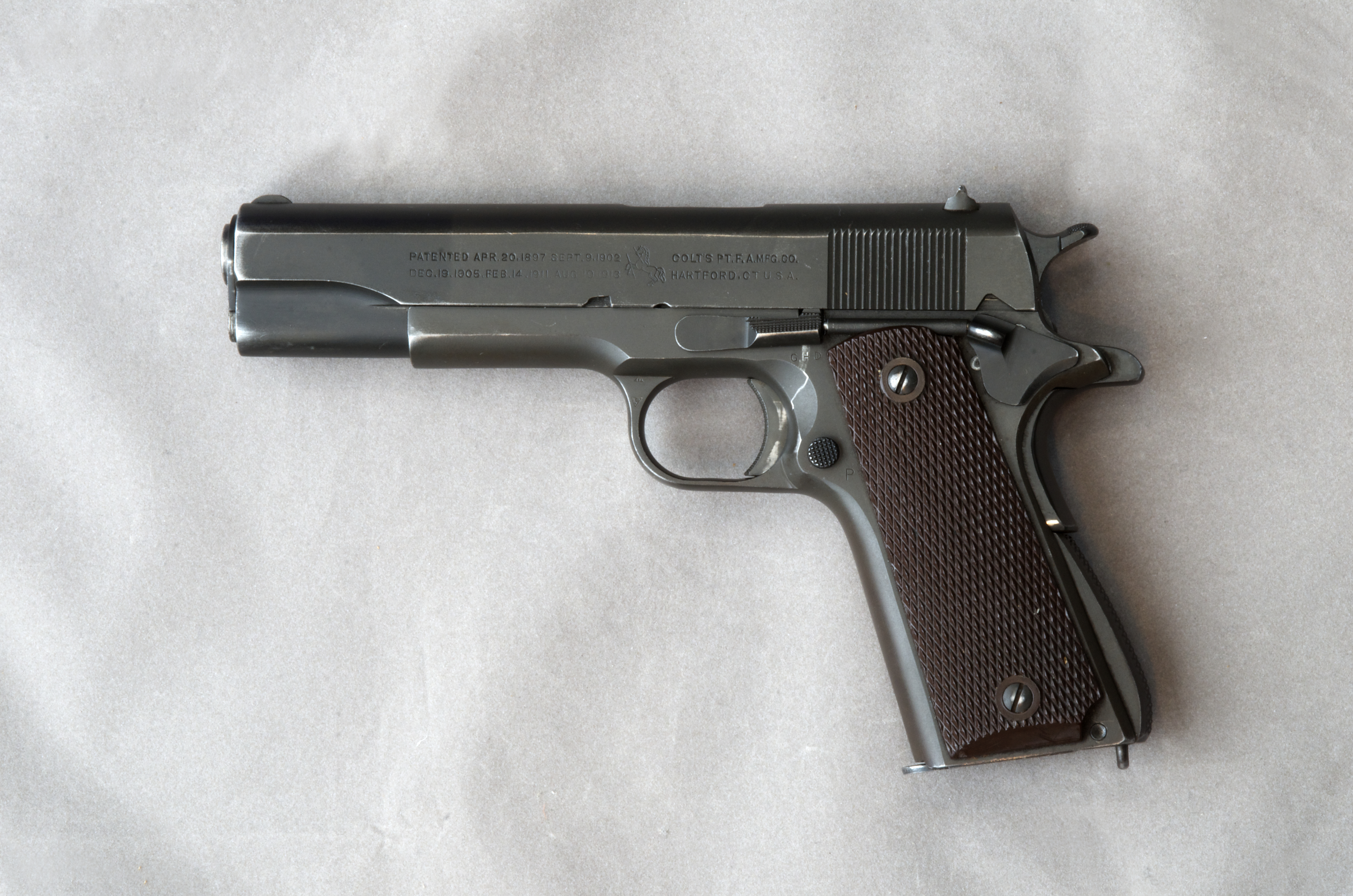
M1911A1 pistol

- Modèle 1935A pistol (7.65mm Longue): Received from France during the First Indochina War.
- MAS-35-S pistol (7.65mm Longue): Received from France during the First Indochina War.
- FN P35
- Colt.45 M1911A1
- Smith & Wesson Model 39
- Type 54 pistol: Chinese copy of the Soviet Tokarev TT-33.

=== Submachine guns ===
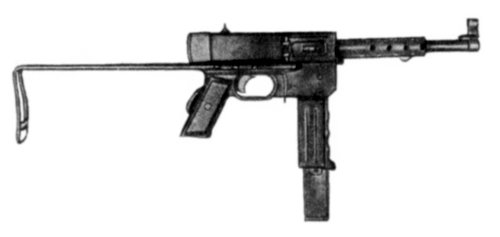
MAT-49 Submachine gun

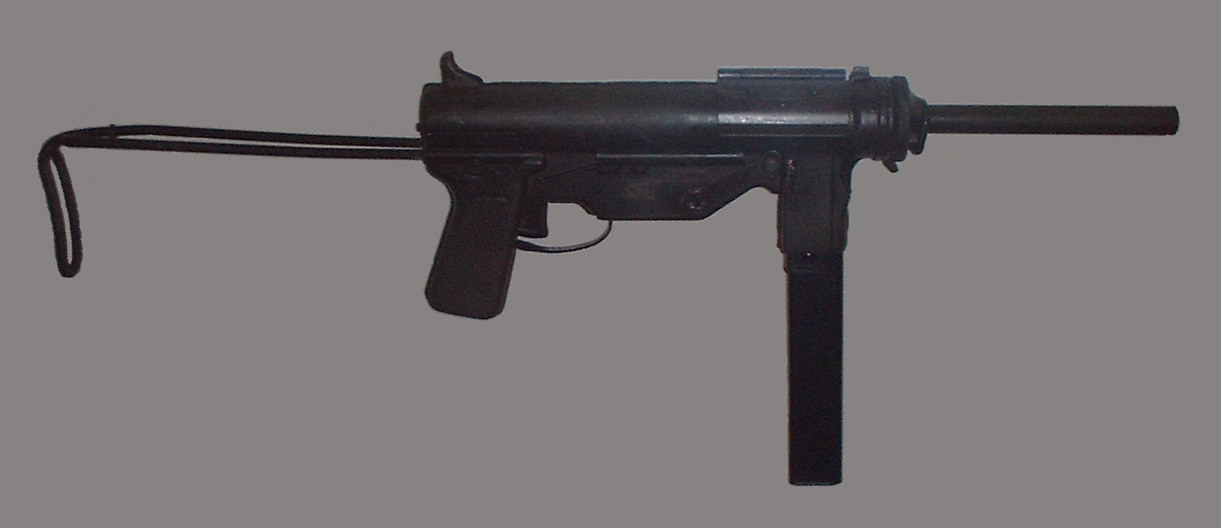
M3 submachine gun

- Sten: Received from France during the First Indochina War.
- MAT-49: Received from France during the First Indochina War.
- M1A1 Thompson
- M3/M3A1 Grease Gun

=== Bolt-action rifles ===
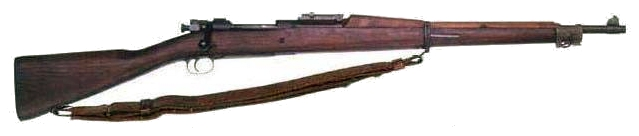
M1903 Springfield rifle

- MAS-36: Received from France during the First Indochina War.
- MAS-36 CR39 folding-stock paratrooper rifle: Received from France during the First Indochina War.
- M1903 Springfield: Received from France during the First Indochina War and the United States.
- Lee–Enfield SMLE Mk III: Received from France during the First Indochina War. Used in small numbers.

=== Shotguns ===
- Ithaca 37 Pump-action

=== Carbines ===
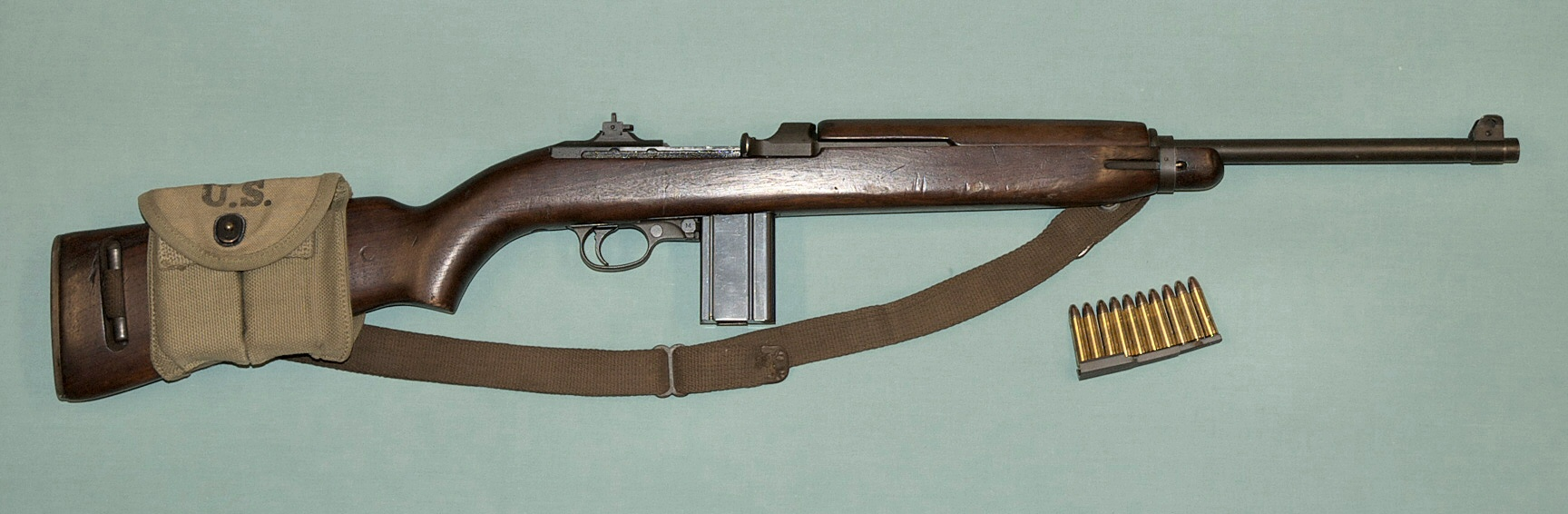
M1 Carbine

- MAS-49/56 Carbine: Received from France after the First Indochina War.
- M1 Carbine: M1 & M2 models were FANK standard issue concurrent with the M1 Garand rifle before receiving the M16.
- M1A1 paratrooper carbine
- M2 Carbine: Full automatic variant.
- CAR-15 Assault carbine: Used by FANK special forces.

=== Sniper rifles ===
- M21 Sniper Weapon System

=== Semi-automatic rifles ===
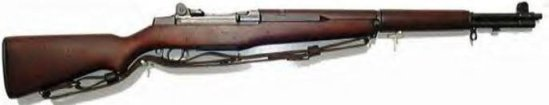
M1 Garand

- MAS-49 rifle: Received from France during the First Indochina War.
- M1 Garand
- SKS: Used extensively in swamp and jungle environments.
- Type 56 semi-automatic rifle: Captured.

=== Assault rifles ===
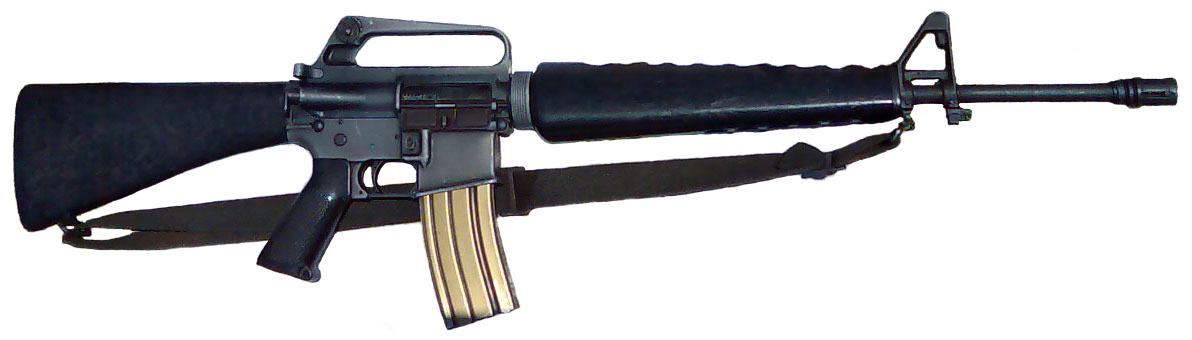
M16A1 was the standard Khmer National Armed Forces (FANK) issue assault rifle

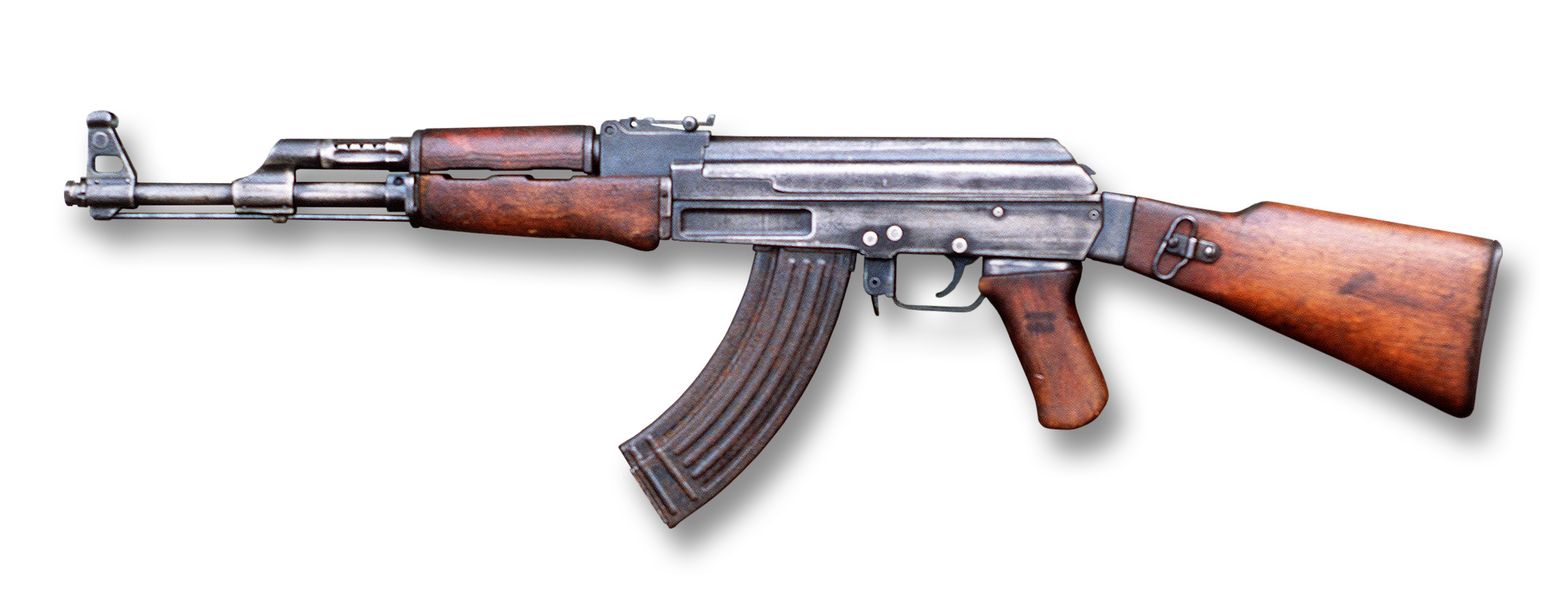
AK-47 and AKM assault rifles were used extensively in swamp and jungle environments by FANK troops

- M16A1 Assault rifle
- FN FAL: Limited quantities received from Belgium. Used in small numbers.
- Heckler & Koch G3: Limited quantities received from West Germany. Used in small numbers.
- vz. 58 Assault rifle: Used in small numbers.
- AK-47 and AKS assault rifles: Used extensively in swamp and jungle environments.
- AKM and AKMS assault rifles: Used extensively in swamp and jungle environments.
- Type 56 and Type 56-1 assault rifles: Captured.

=== Light machine guns ===
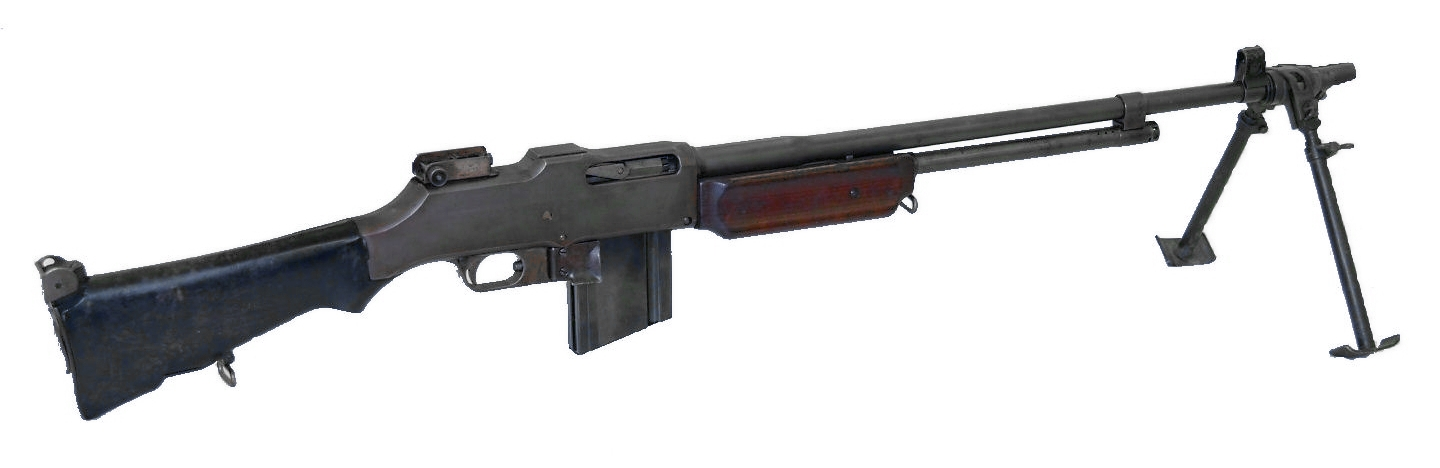
M1918A2 Browning Automatic Rifle

- FM 24/29: Received from France during the First Indochina War.
- Bren: Received from France during the First Indochina War. Used in small numbers.
- Degtyaryov DP/DPM
- M1918A2 BAR

=== General-purpose machine guns ===
- M60: FANK standard-issue machine gun.
- M60B/M60D machine gun: mounted on UH-1D/H utility helicopters and UH-1G gunships.
- RPD: Captured.
- Type 56 machine gun: Chinese copy of the RPD.
- M1919A6 Browning light machine gun

=== Medium and Heavy machine guns ===
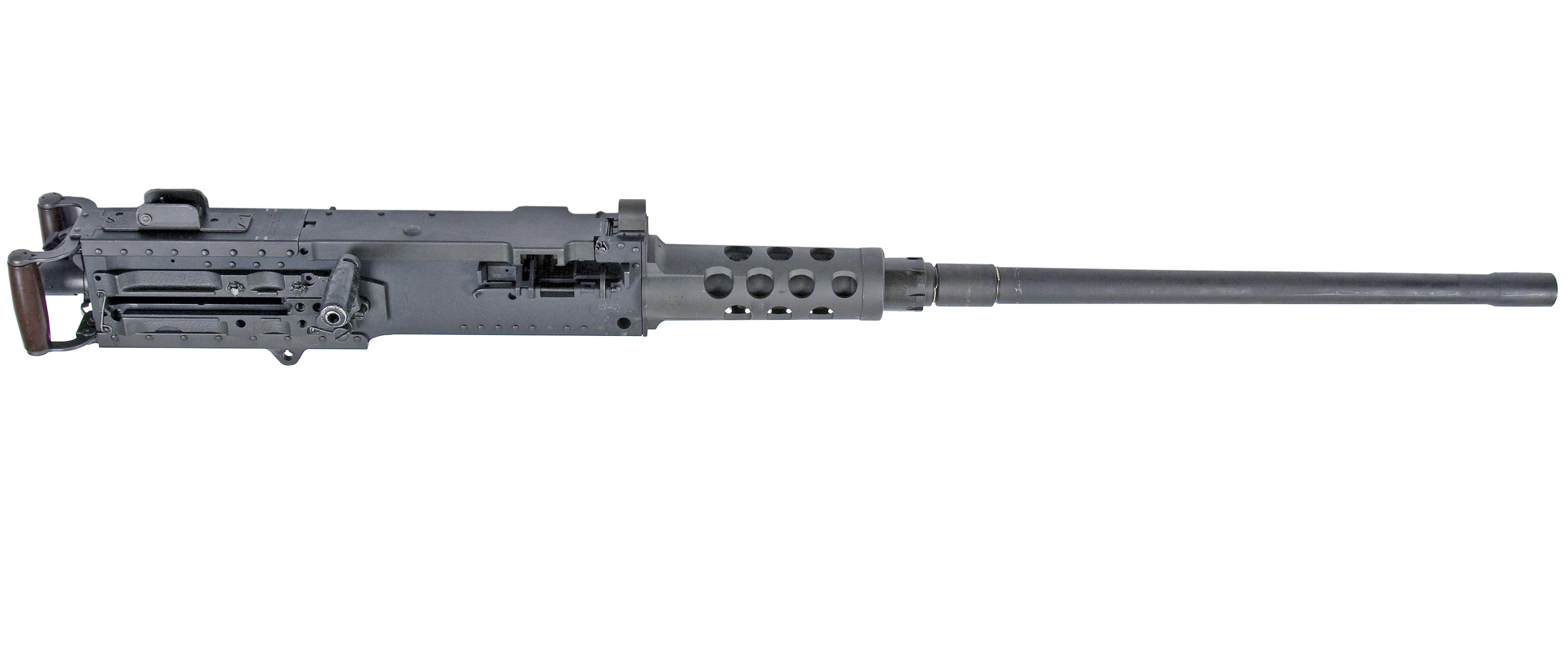
M2HB heavy machine gun

- M1917 Browning machine gun: Limited service; used in small numbers.
- Browning M1919A4 .30 Cal
- Browning M2HB .50 Cal: Fitted to M113 APCs.
- SG-43/SGM Goryunov: Captured; mounted on wheeled APCs.
- DShKM: Captured; mounted on wheeled APCs.

=== Grenade systems ===
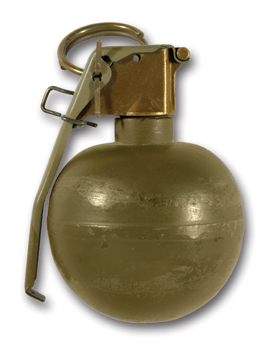
M67 hand grenade

- Alsetex OF37 grenade: Received from France during the First Indochina War.
- Alsetex DF37 grenade: Received from France during the First Indochina War.
- F-1 hand grenade: Received from France during the First Indochina War.
- Mark 2 "Pineapple" fragmentation hand/rifle grenade
- M26 fragmentation hand grenade
- M59 "Baseball" hand grenade
- M61 fragmentation hand grenade
- M67 fragmentation hand grenade: FANK standard-issue fragmentation grenade.
- M18 colored smoke hand grenade
- M34 white phosphorus/smoke grenade

=== Aircraft bombs ===
- CBU-55 cluster bomblet: loaded aboard T-28D Trojan fighter-bombers.
- CBU-24 cluster bomblet: loaded aboard AU-24A Stallion mini-gunships.
- Mark 81 (250 lb) general-purpose bomb: loaded aboard T-28D Trojans and AU-24A Stallion mini-gunships.
- Mark 82 (500 lb) general-purpose bomb: loaded aboard C-123K Provider transports.
- 25 lb fragmentation bomb: loaded aboard C-123K Provider transports.

=== Land mine systems ===
- M14 anti-personnel blast mine
- M16 bounding anti-personnel fragmentation mine
- M18A1 Claymore anti-personnel mine

=== Rocket systems ===
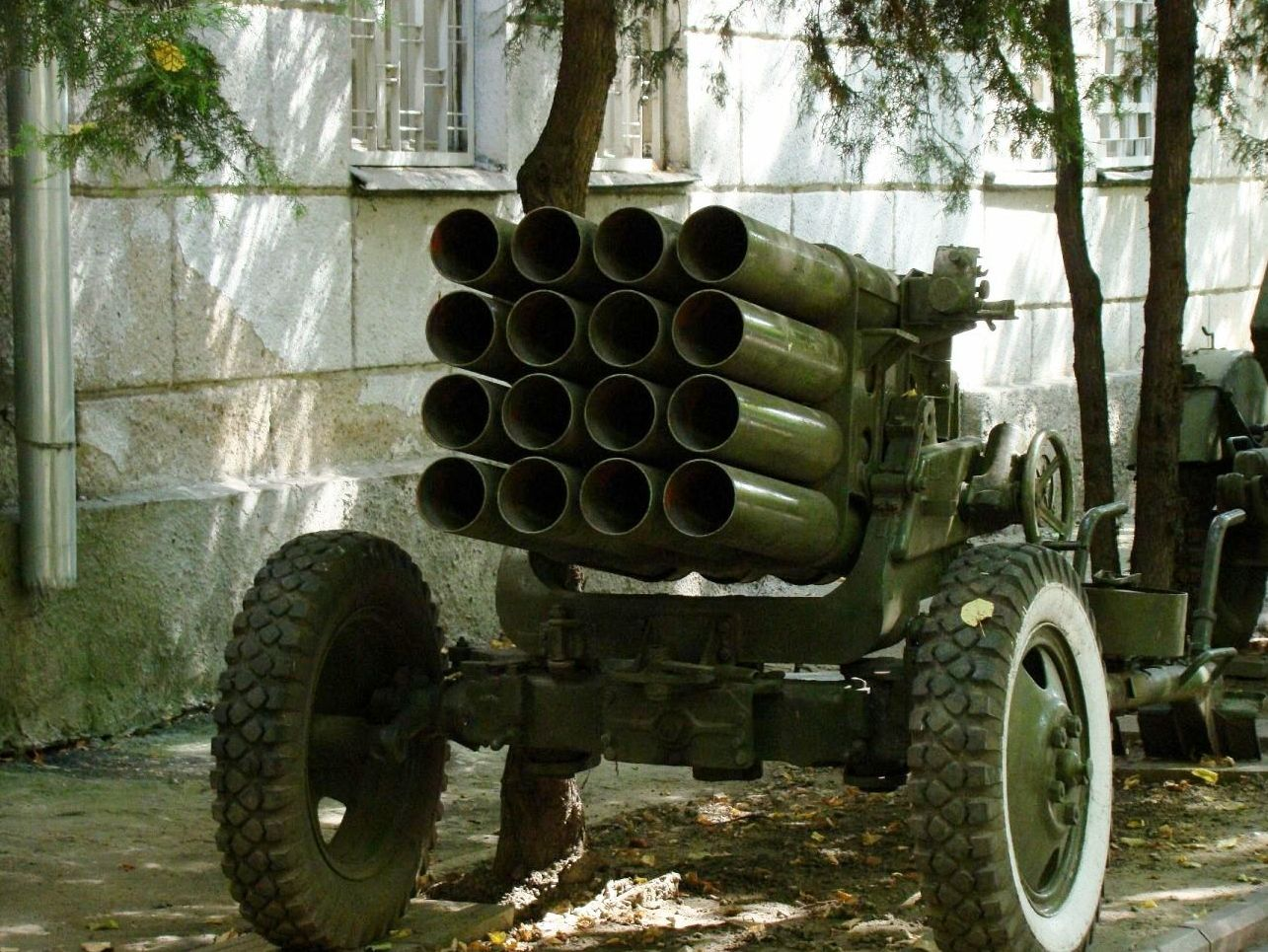
BM-14 140mm, 16-round towed launcher (RPU-14).

- BM-13 132 mm towed multiple rocket launcher (MBRL): used early in the war
- BM-14 140 mm towed multiple rocket launcher (MBRL): used early in the war

=== Anti-tank rocket launchers ===
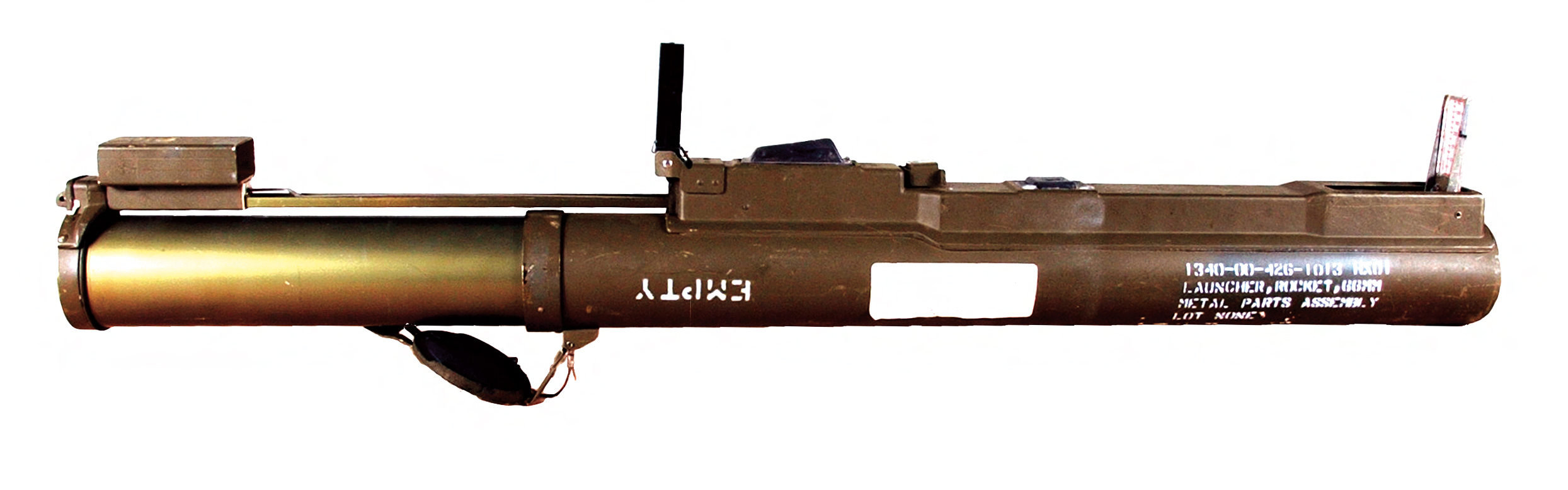
M72 LAW

- M72 LAW: FANK standard issue anti-tank rocket launcher.
- M202 FLASH: Used in small numbers.
- RPG-2
- RPG-7
- Type 56 RPG: Captured.
- Type 69 RPG: Captured.

=== Grenade launchers ===
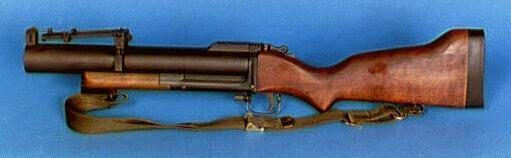
M79 grenade launcher

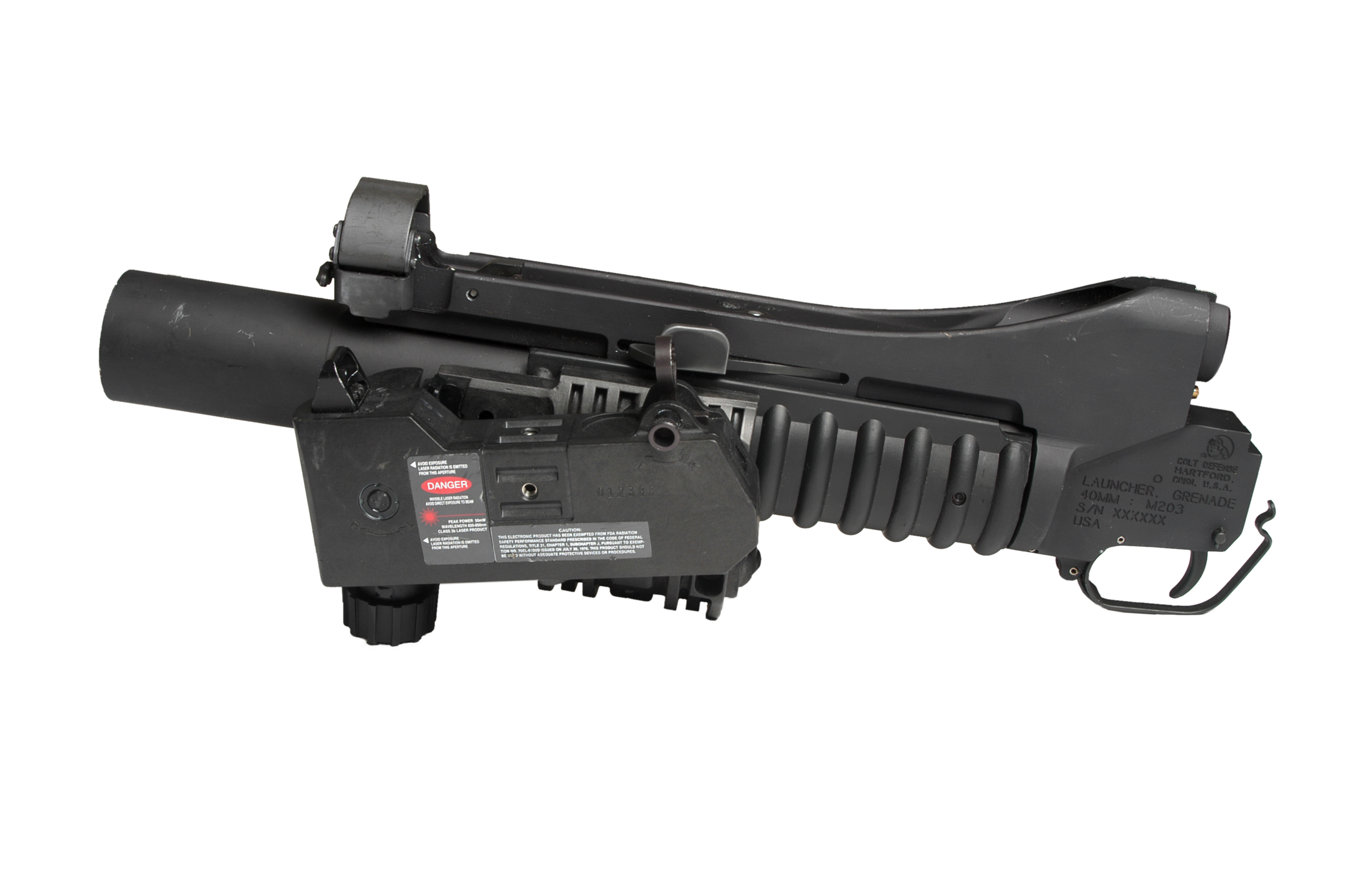
M203 grenade launcher

- M79
- M203: Used in small numbers.

=== Recoilless rifles ===
- M18A1 57 mm
- M20 75 mm
- M67 90 mm (shoulder-fired)
- M40A1 106 mm
- B-10 82 mm
- B-11 107 mm

=== Mortars ===
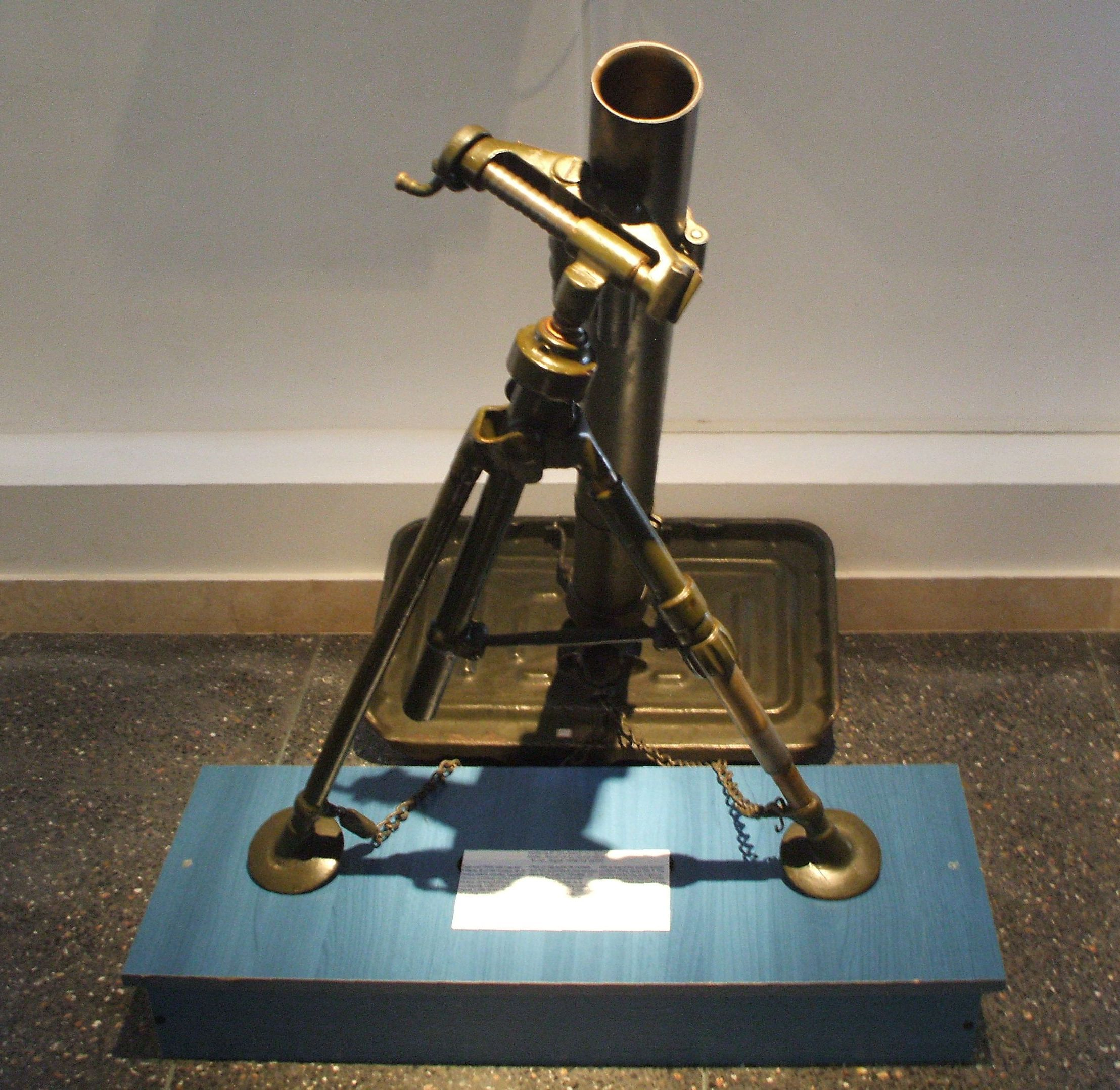
Brandt Mle 27/31 81 mm mortar

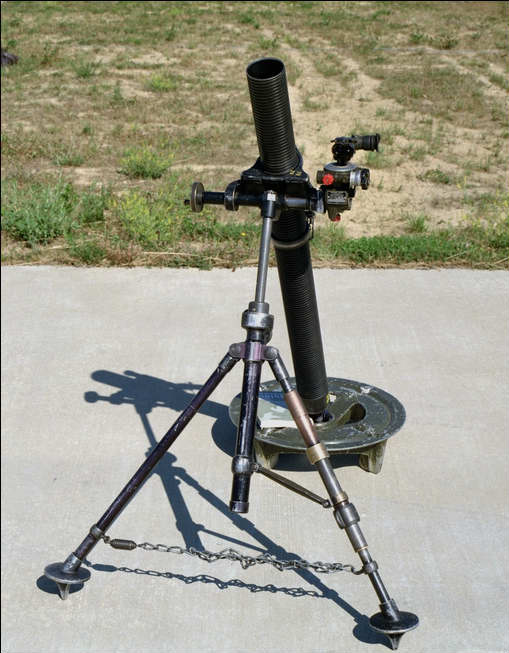
M29 81 mm mortar

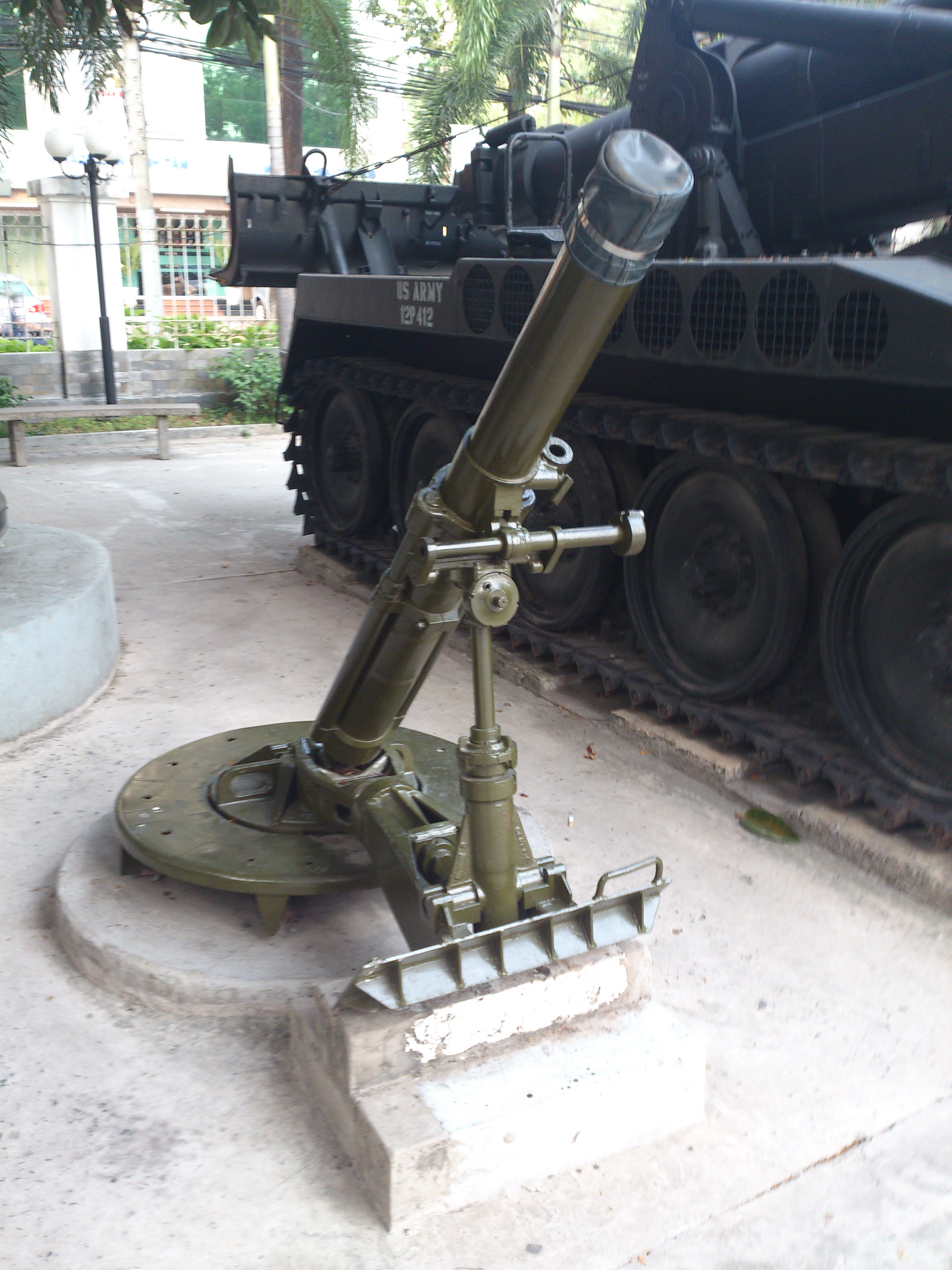
M30 4.2-inch (106.7mm) mortar

- Brandt Mle 1935 60 mm mortar: Received from France during the First Indochina War.
- M19 60 mm mortar
- Brandt Mle 27/31 81 mm mortar: Received from France during the First Indochina War.
- M29 81 mm mortar
- M2 4.2-inch (107 mm) mortar: Mounted on M106A1 mortar carriers.
- M30 4.2-inch (106.7mm) mortar

=== Howitzers and anti-tank guns ===
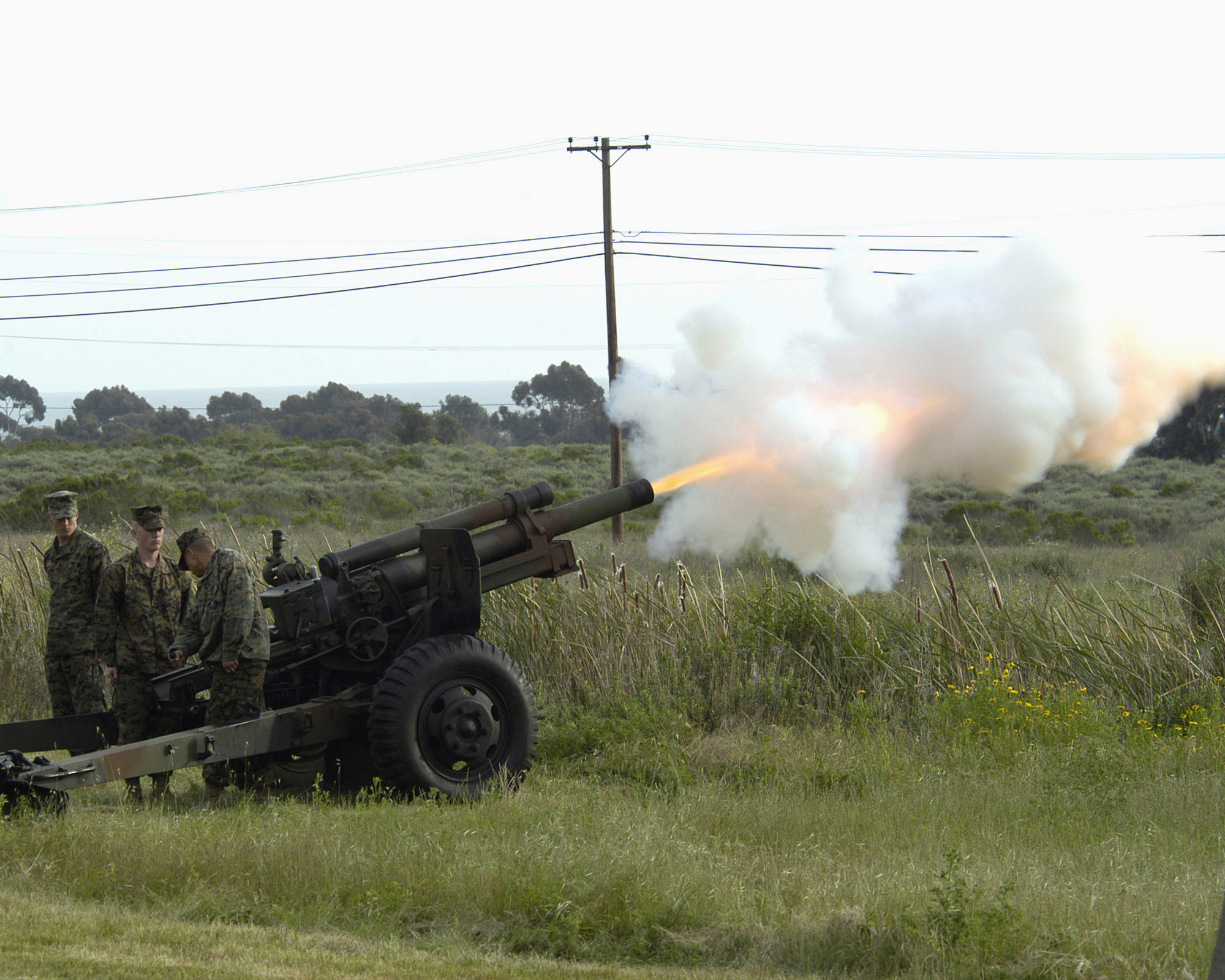
M101 105 mm field howitzer

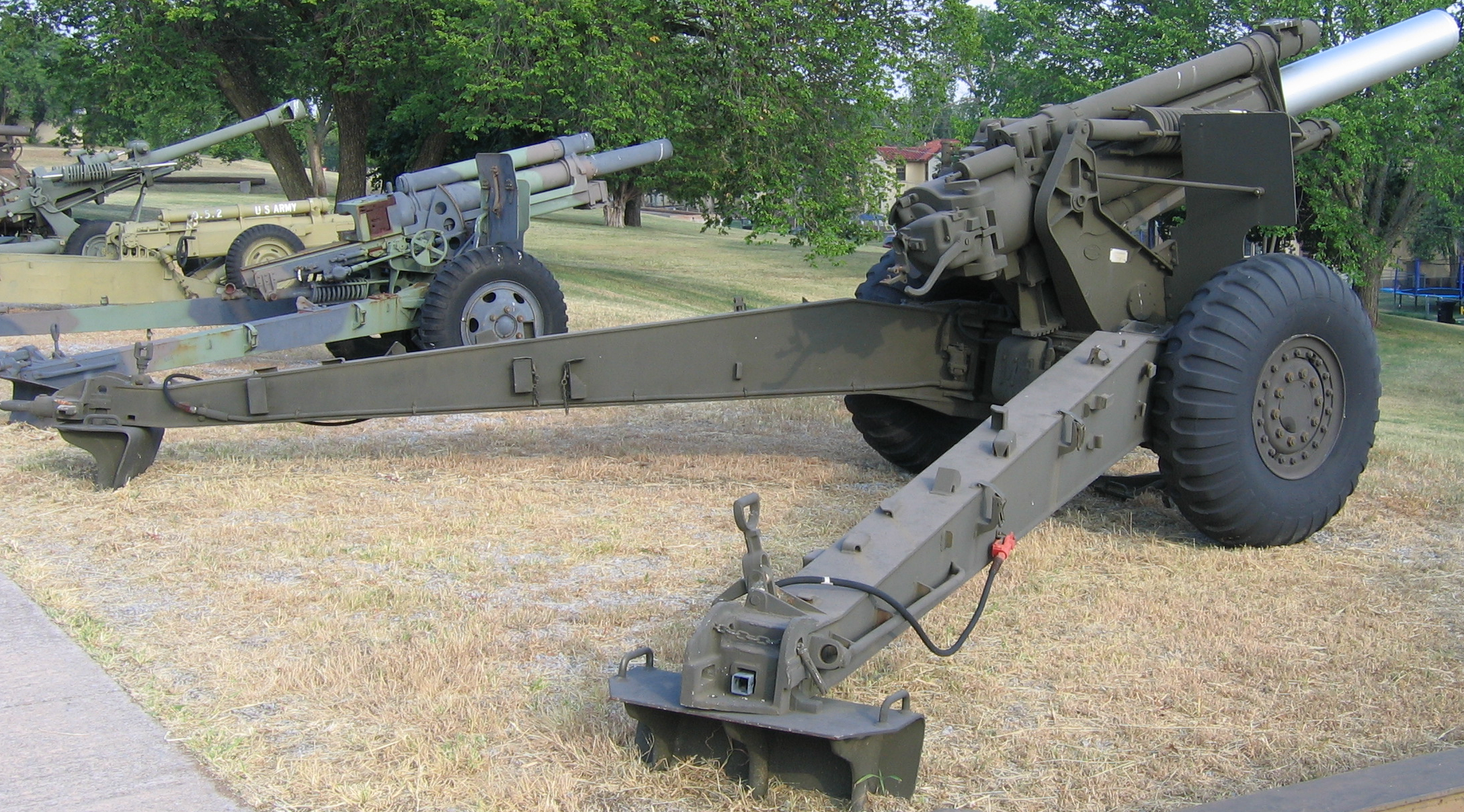
M114 155 mm field howitzer

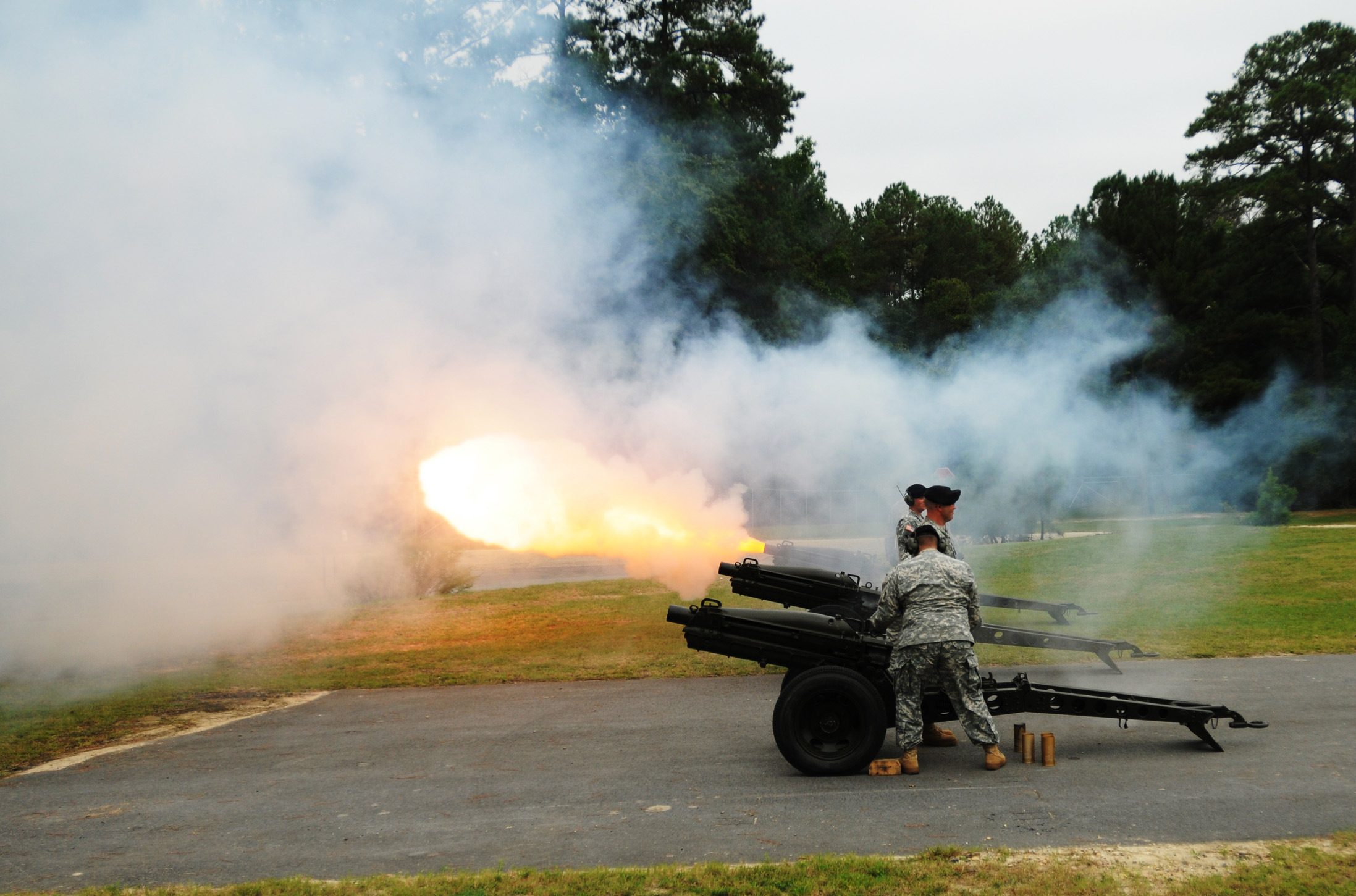
M116 75 mm pack field howitzer

- M101A1 105 mm towed field howitzer
- M102 105 mm towed light howitzer
- M114A1 155 mm towed field howitzer
- M116 75 mm pack field howitzer
- ZiS-3 76 mm anti-tank gun
- M-30 122 mm towed howitzer
- Type 59-1 130 mm towed field gun
- M109 155 mm self-propelled gun: Used in small numbers.

=== Autocannons ===
- M197 three-barrel 20×102mm rotary cannon: mounted in the left cargo door of the AU-24A Stallion mini-gunships.

=== Air defense guns ===
- Type 55/65 37 mm anti-aircraft gun
- Bofors 40 mm L/60 anti-aircraft gun
- AZP S-60 57 mm anti-aircraft gun

=== Vehicles ===
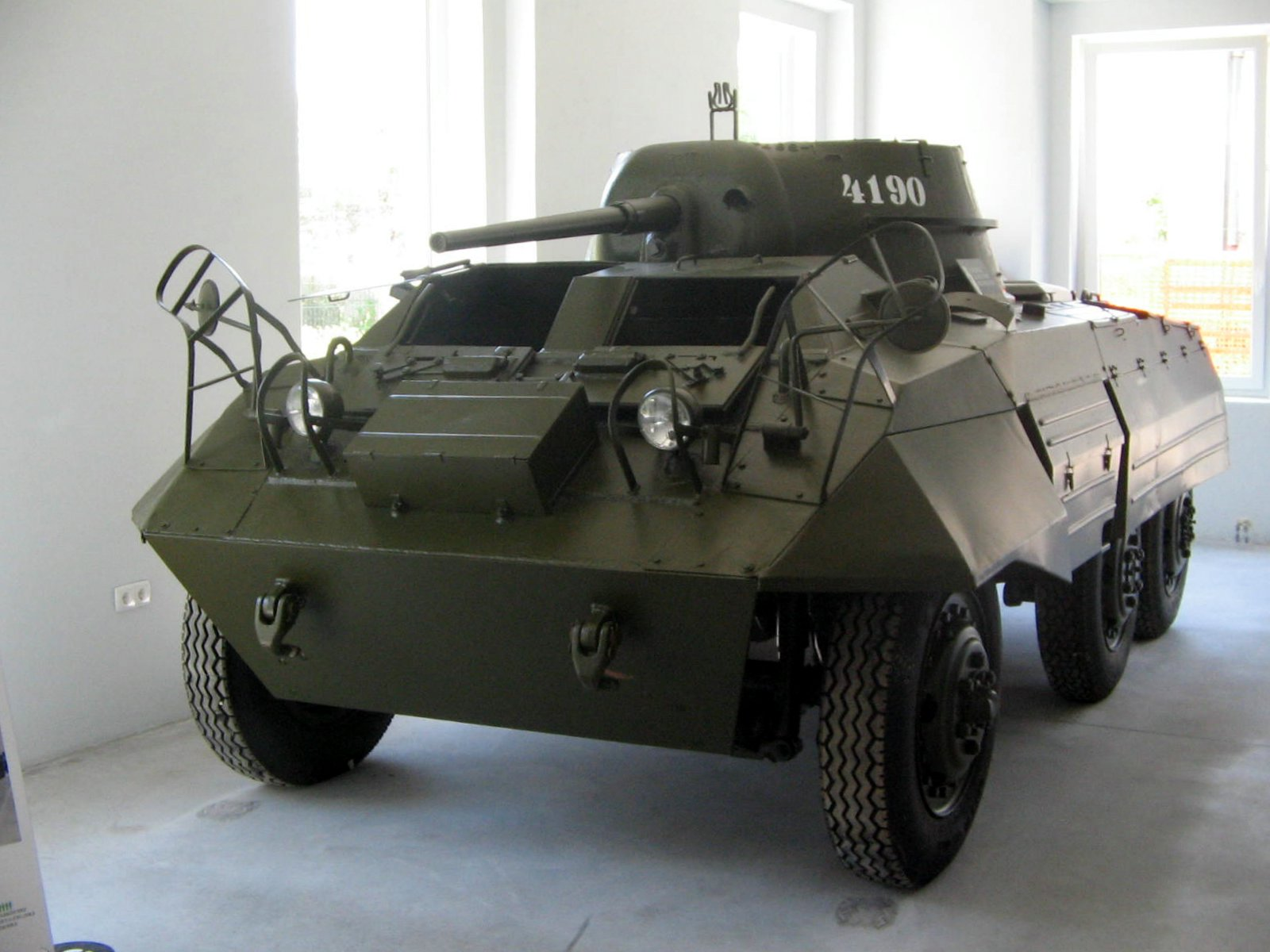
M8 Greyhound armoured car

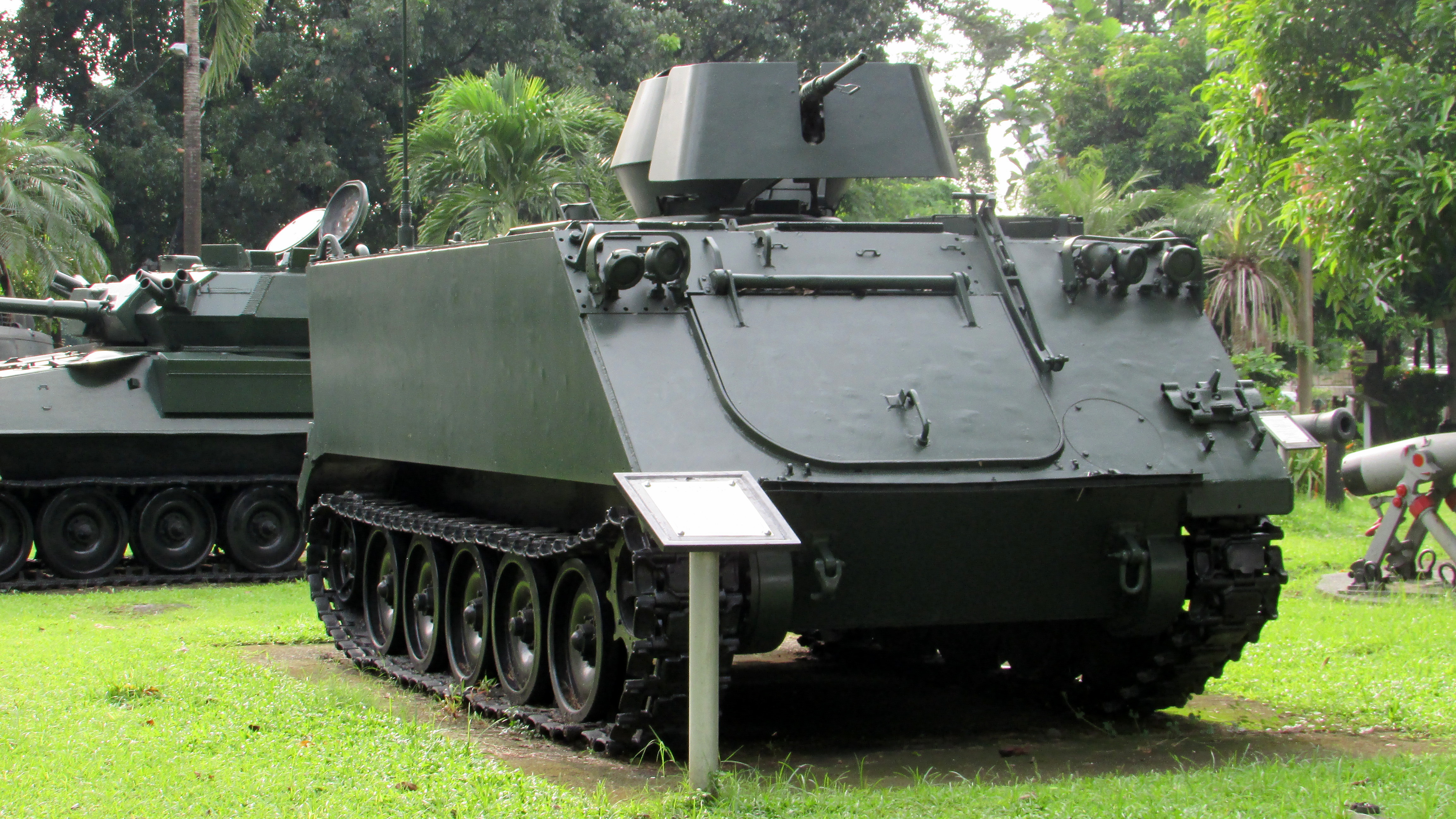
M113 Armoured Personnel Carrier fitted with ACAV kit

- M24 Chaffee Light tank
- AMX-13 Light tank
- M8 HMC 75 mm self-propelled howitzer
- M8 Greyhound armoured car
- M20 armoured utility car
- Panhard AML-60 armoured car
- M2 half-track car
- M3 half-track
- M3A1 Scout Car
- BTR-40 armoured personnel carrier (APC)
- BTR-152 armoured personnel carrier (APC)
- M113 armored personnel carrier
- M106A1 mortar carrier
- Willys MB ¼-ton (4×4) jeep: Fitted with pintle-mounted M60 machine guns or Browning M1919A4 medium machine guns.
- Land Rover (4×4) Series I-II
- GAZ-69A (4×4) field car
- M151A1 ¼-ton (4×4) utility truck: Some converted into makeshift armoured cars for security and road convoy escort duties.
- Dodge WC-51/52 ¾-ton (4×4) utility truck
- Dodge M37 ¾-ton (4×4) 1953 utility truck
- Yuejin NJ-130 2.5 ton (4×2) truck
- GAZ-63 (4×4) 2-ton truck
- GMC/Chevrolet C-50 medium-duty truck
- Chevrolet G506 1½-ton (4×4) cargo truck
- Jiefang CA-30 general purpose 2.5 ton (6×6) truck
- GMC CCKW 2½-ton (6×6) cargo truck
- GMC C7500 heavy-duty truck
- International Harvester 7-ton commercial truck with trailer
- Dodge 7-ton commercial truck with trailer
- M35A2 2½-ton (6×6) cargo truck
- M809 5-ton (6×6) cargo truck

=== Helicopters ===
- Sud Aviation SA 313B Alouette II light helicopter
- Sud Aviation SA-316B Alouette III light helicopter
- Mil Mi-4 Hound light helicopter: used early in the war
- Sikorsky H-34 Choctaw transport
- Bell UH-1G Huey helicopter gunship
- Bell UH-1D/H Iroquois Utility helicopter/transport

=== Aircraft ===
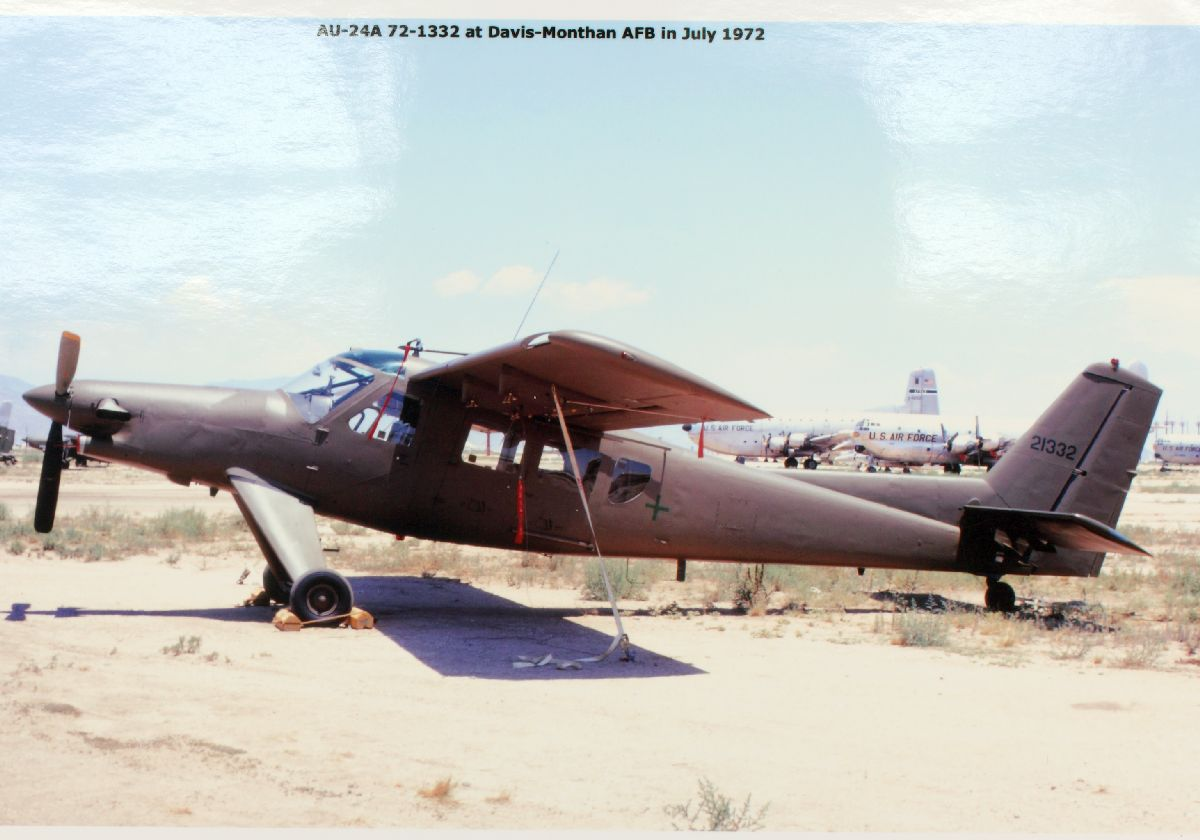
Helio AU-24A Stallion in storage at Davis-Monthan AFB, July 1972, prior to its delivery to the Khmer Air Force.

- MiG-17F fighter jet: used early in the war
- Shenyang J-5 fighter jet: used early in the war
- Shenyang FT-5 jet trainer: used early in the war
- MiG-15UTI jet trainer: used early in the war
- Potez CM.170R Fouga Magister jet trainer/fighter-bomber: used early in the war
- Cessna T-37B Tweet jet trainer/fighter-bomber
- Gardan GY-80 Horizon light trainer
- Cessna T-41D Mescalero trainer
- North American T-28B Trojan trainer
- North American T-28D Trojan trainer/fighter-bomber
- Douglas AD-4N Skyraider night attack aircraft: used early in the war
- AU-24A Stallion mini-gunship
- AC-47D Spooky gunship
- De Havilland Canada DHC U-6 (L-20) Beaver STOL utility transport
- Dassault MD 315R Flamant light transport: used early in the war
- Antonov An-2 Colt utility aircraft: used early in the war
- Douglas C-47D Skytrain transport
- Curtiss C-46F Commando transport: used early in the war
- Fairchild C-123K Provider transport
- U-1A Otter liaison aircraft
- U-17A/B light utility aircraft
- Cessna L-19A/O-1D Bird Dog reconnaissance/observation light aircraft
- EC-47D SIGINT aircraft

=== Naval craft ===
- PC-461 class Patrol Craft
- Landing Craft Support (LSSL)
- PCF/Inshore Mark Mk 1 and 2 coastal patrol craft (also known as "Swift boat")
- PBR Mk 1 and 2 river patrol boat (a.k.a. "Bibber")
- Monitor (MON, heavily gunned riverine craft, a.k.a. "River Battleship" or "Mike boat")
- Monitor (H) Howitzer version armed with 40 mm cannons and M49 105 mm howitzers.
- Monitor (F) version equipped with M10-8 Flamethrowers (a.k.a. "Zippo")
- Assault Support Patrol Boat Mk 1 (ASPB, a.k.a. "Alpha boat")
- Patrol Craft/Tug (YTL)
- EDIC III-class Landing craft tank (LCT)
- Landing Ship Infantry Large (LSIL/LCI)
- Landing Craft Utility (LCU/YFU)
- Armored Troop Carrier (ATC, a.k.a. "Tango boat")
- ATC refueler
- ATC recharger
- Landing Craft Mechanized Mk 6 Mod 1-LCM (6) Landing Craft Utility (LCU)
- LCM (8) LCU
- Landing Craft Vehicle Personnel (LCVP)
- Command and Communications Boat (CCB, a.k.a. "Charlie boat")
- Minesweeper River boat (MSR/MSM)
- 63-foot Combat Salvage Boat (CSB)
- Yard Tug Light (YTL)
- Mobile Support Base (MSB)
- Floating Crane (YD)
- Drydock

== Khmer Rouge forces equipment ==
=== Pistols ===
- Tokarev TT-33
- Type 54 pistol: Chinese copy of the TT-33.
- Type 59 pistol: Chinese copy of the Makarov PM.
- Colt.45 M1911A1: Captured from government forces.

=== Submachine guns ===
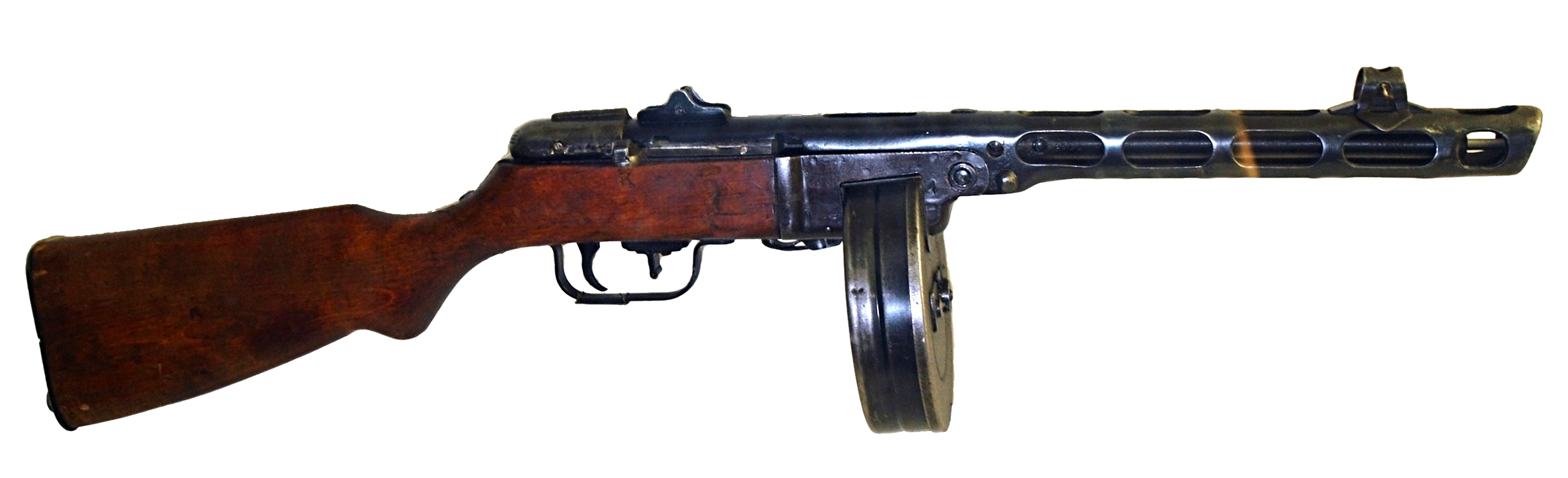
PPSh-41 submachine gun

- MAT-49: Captured from government forces.
- M1A1 Thompson: Captured from government forces.
- M3/M3A1 Grease Gun: Captured from government forces.
- vz. 24/26
- PPSh-41
- PPS-43
- K-50M

=== Carbines ===
- MAS-49/56 Carbine: Captured from government forces.
- M1/M2 Carbine: Captured from government forces.

=== Bolt-action rifles ===
- Mosin–Nagant
- Type 53 Carbine: Chinese copy of the Mosin–Nagant M1944 carbine.
- MAS-36: Captured from government forces.
- MAS-36 CR39 folding-stock paratrooper rifle: Captured from government forces.
- Arisaka: Used in small numbers.

=== Sniper rifles ===
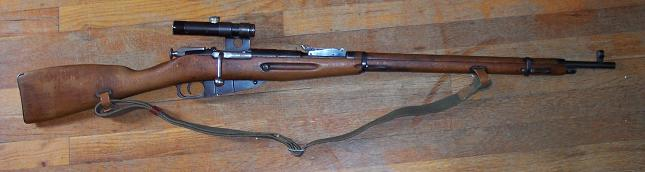
Hungarian M/52 sniper rifle with PU 3.5× optics.

- M/52
- Dragunov SVD-63: limited use by the PAVN.

=== Semi-automatic rifles ===
- SKS
- Type 56 semi-automatic rifle: Chinese copy of the SKS.
- MAS-49 rifle: Captured from government forces.
- M1 Garand: Captured from government forces.

=== Assault rifles ===
- AK-47 and AKS assault rifles
- AKM and AKMS assault rifles
- Type 56 and Type 56-1 assault rifles
- Type 63 assault rifle: Used in small numbers.
- vz. 58 Assault rifle: Used in small numbers.
- M16A1 Assault rifle: Captured from government forces.

=== Light machine guns ===
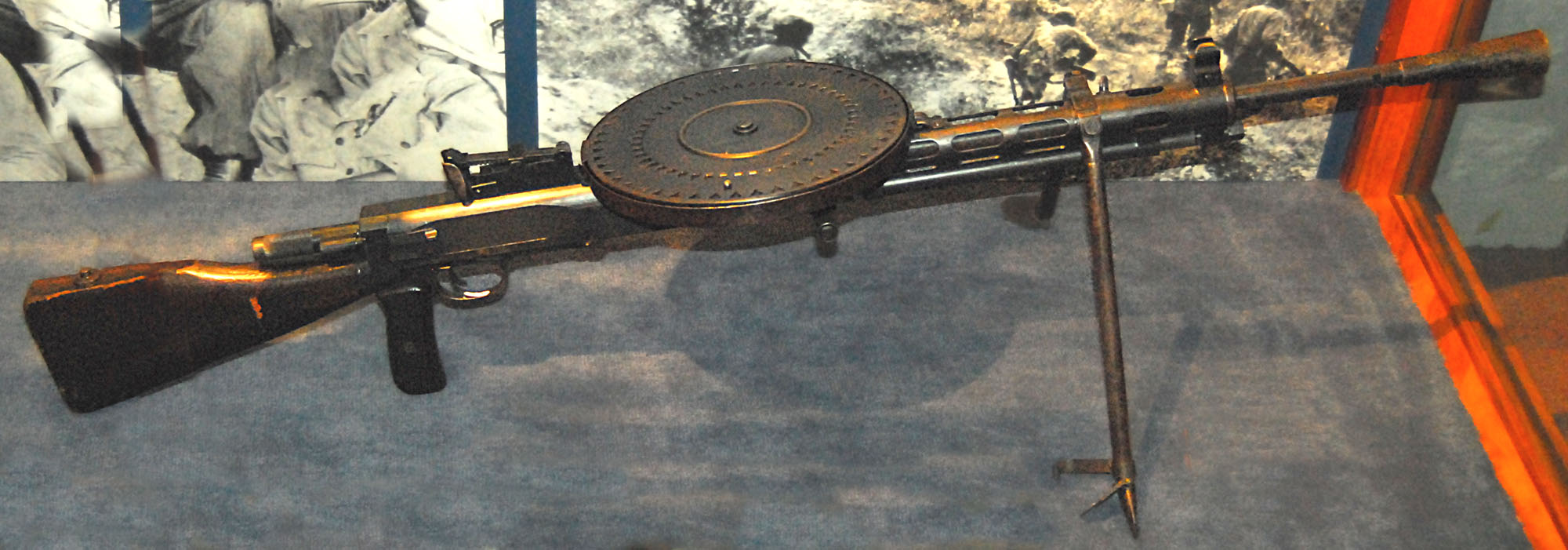
Degtyaryov DP/DPM light machine gun (Chinese Type 53)

- Degtyaryov DP/DPM
- Type 53: Chinese copy of the Degtyaryov DP/DPM.
- RPK
- M1918A2 BAR: Captured from government forces.

=== General-purpose machine guns ===
- Degtyaryov RP-46
- RPD
- Type 56 machine gun: Chinese copy of the RPD. Used extensively.
- PK/PKM: Used in small numbers.
- M60 machine gun: Captured from government forces.

=== Medium and heavy machine guns ===
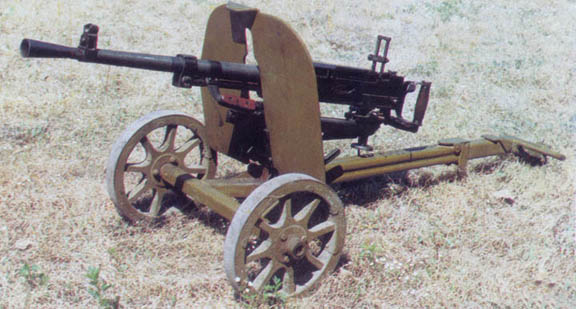
SG-43/SGM Goryunov machine gun (Chinese Type 53/57)

- SG-43/SGM Goryunov
- Type 53/57: Chinese variant of the SG-43/SGM.
- DShKM
- Type 54: Chinese variant of the DShKM.
- KPV
- Browning M1919A4: Captured from government forces.
- Browning M2HB .50 Cal: Captured from government forces.

=== Grenade systems ===
- F1/M33 hand grenade
- RGD-33 hand grenade
- RG-42 hand grenade
- RGD-5 hand grenade
- RPG-43 anti-tank grenade
- Type 1/M33 hand grenade
- Type 42 hand grenade
- Type 59 hand grenade
- Type 67 stick grenade

=== Land mine systems and booby traps ===
- POMZ-2 anti-personnel mine
- Type 2M anti-personnel mine
- PMD-6/7 anti-personnel mine
- PP-Mi-Sr anti-personnel mine
- TMD-B anti-personnel mine
- TM-41 anti-tank mine
- TMB-2 anti-tank mine
- TM-46/TMN-46 anti-tank mine
- Punji stakes

=== Naval mine systems ===
- Chinese-made submerged floating river mines: employed by the PAVN and the Khmer Rouge against both military and civilian commercial shipping along the Mekong River.

=== Rocket systems ===
- BM-13 132 mm towed multiple rocket launcher (MBRL): Captured from government forces.
- BM-14 140 mm towed multiple rocket launcher (MBRL): Captured from government forces.
- Type 63 107 mm rocket: fired from makeshift rocket launchers made out of cut bamboo branches or from a more sophisticated two-shot launcher on a simple metal tripod.

=== Anti-aircraft missiles ===
- SA-7 Grail surface-to-air missile: Used by the PAVN.

=== Anti-tank rocket launchers and guided missiles ===
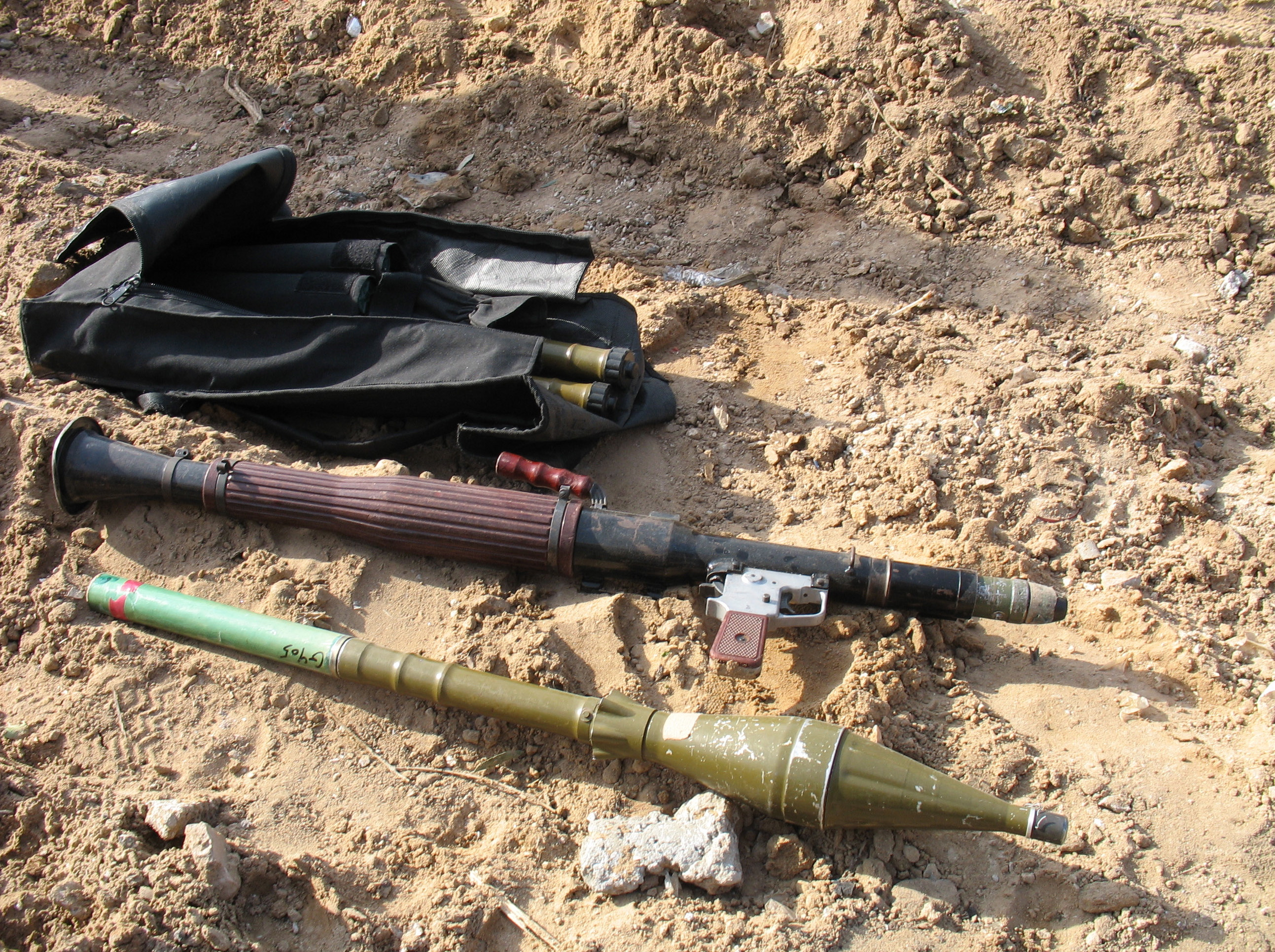
Type 69 RPG

- RPG-2: Used extensively.
- RPG-7
- Type 56 RPG: Used extensively.
- Type 69 RPG: Used extensively.
- M72 LAW: Captured from government forces.
- AT-3 Sagger anti-tank guided missile (ATGM): Used by the Khmer Rouge against riverine supply convoys on the lower Mekong-Bassac corridors.

=== Grenade launchers ===
- M79: Captured from government forces.

=== Recoilless rifles ===
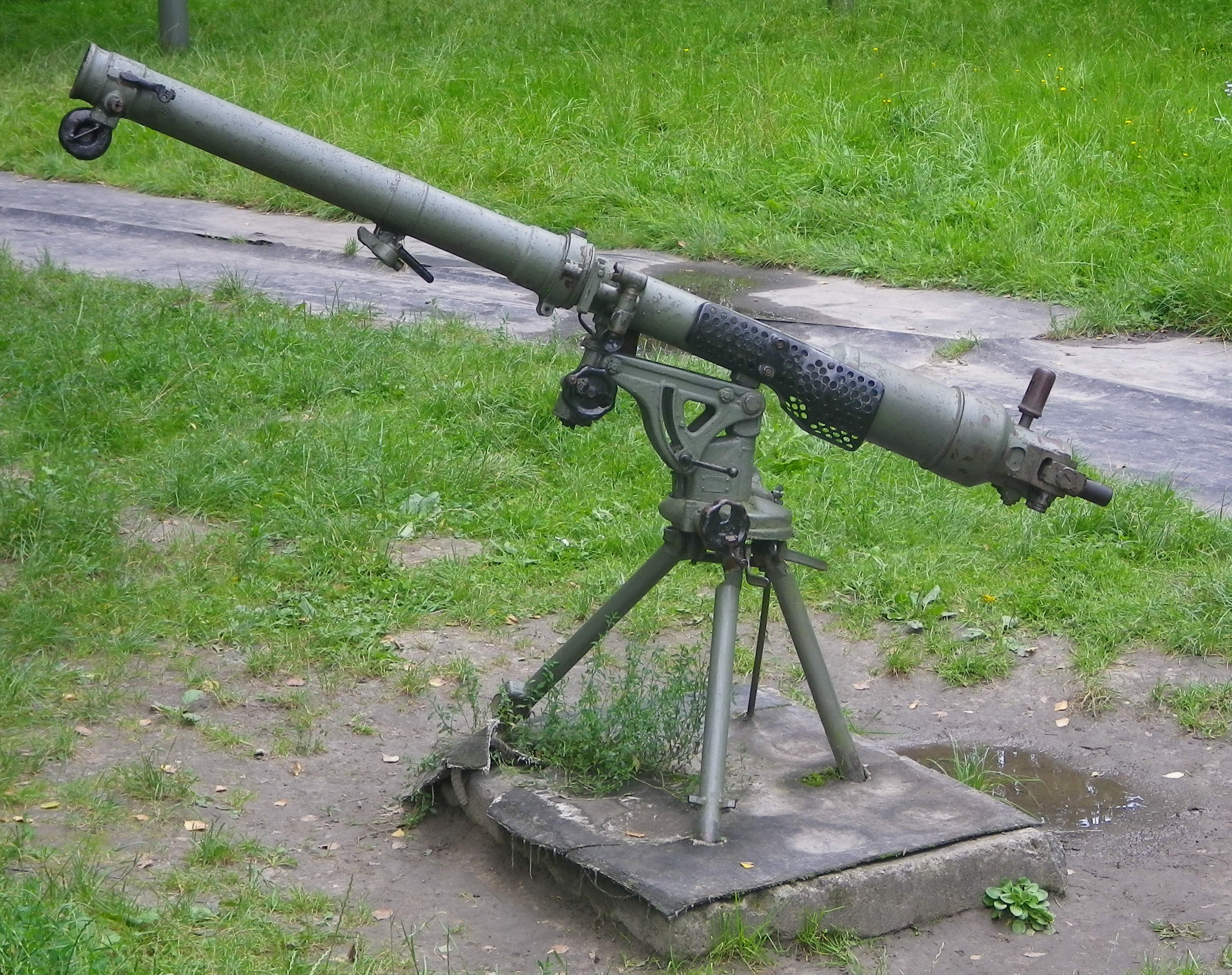
B-10 82 mm recoilless rifle

- M20 75 mm: Captured from government forces.
- M40A1 106 mm: Captured from government forces.
- Type 56 75 mm: Chinese variant of the US M20.
- Type 65 75 mm: Chinese variant of the US M20.
- B-10 82 mm
- B-11 107 mm

=== Mortars ===
- Brandt Mle 1935 60 mm mortar: Captured from government forces.
- M19 60 mm mortar: Captured from government forces.
- M29 81 mm mortar: Captured from government forces.
- Brandt Mle 27/31 81 mm mortar: Captured from government forces.
- Type 53 82 mm mortar
- PM-41 82 mm mortar
- Type 55 120 mm mortar

=== Howitzers and anti-tank guns ===
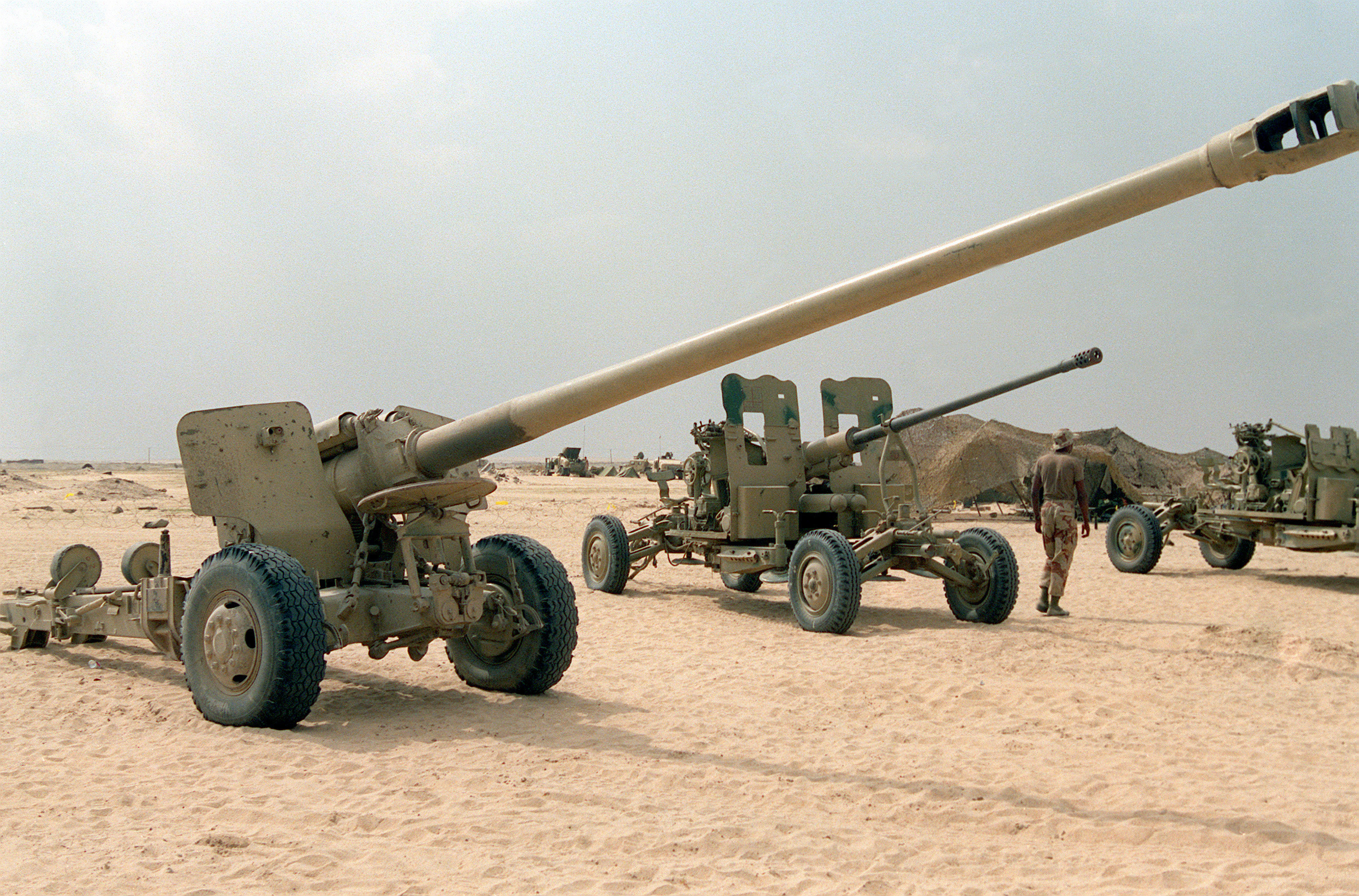
Type 59-1 130 mm field gun

The Khmer Rouge used a small number of field guns or captured howitzers from government forces.

- ZiS-3 76 mm anti-tank gun: Captured from government forces.
- 85 mm divisional gun D-44
- T-12 100 mm towed anti-tank gun
- M-30 122 mm towed howitzer: Captured from government forces.
- Type 60 122 mm towed field gun
- Type 59-1 130 mm towed field gun: Used in small numbers.
- M101A1 105 mm towed field howitzer: Captured from government forces.
- M114A1 155 mm towed field howitzer: Captured from government forces.

=== Air defense guns ===
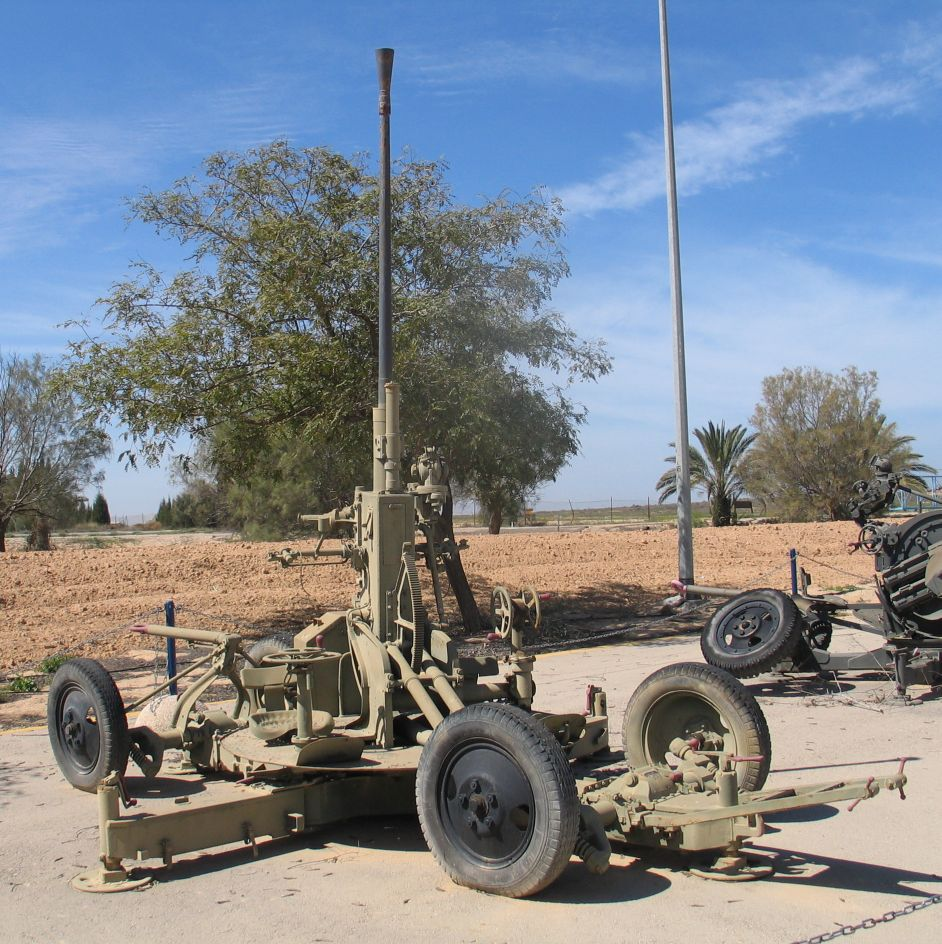
37mm automatic air defense gun M1939 (61-K)

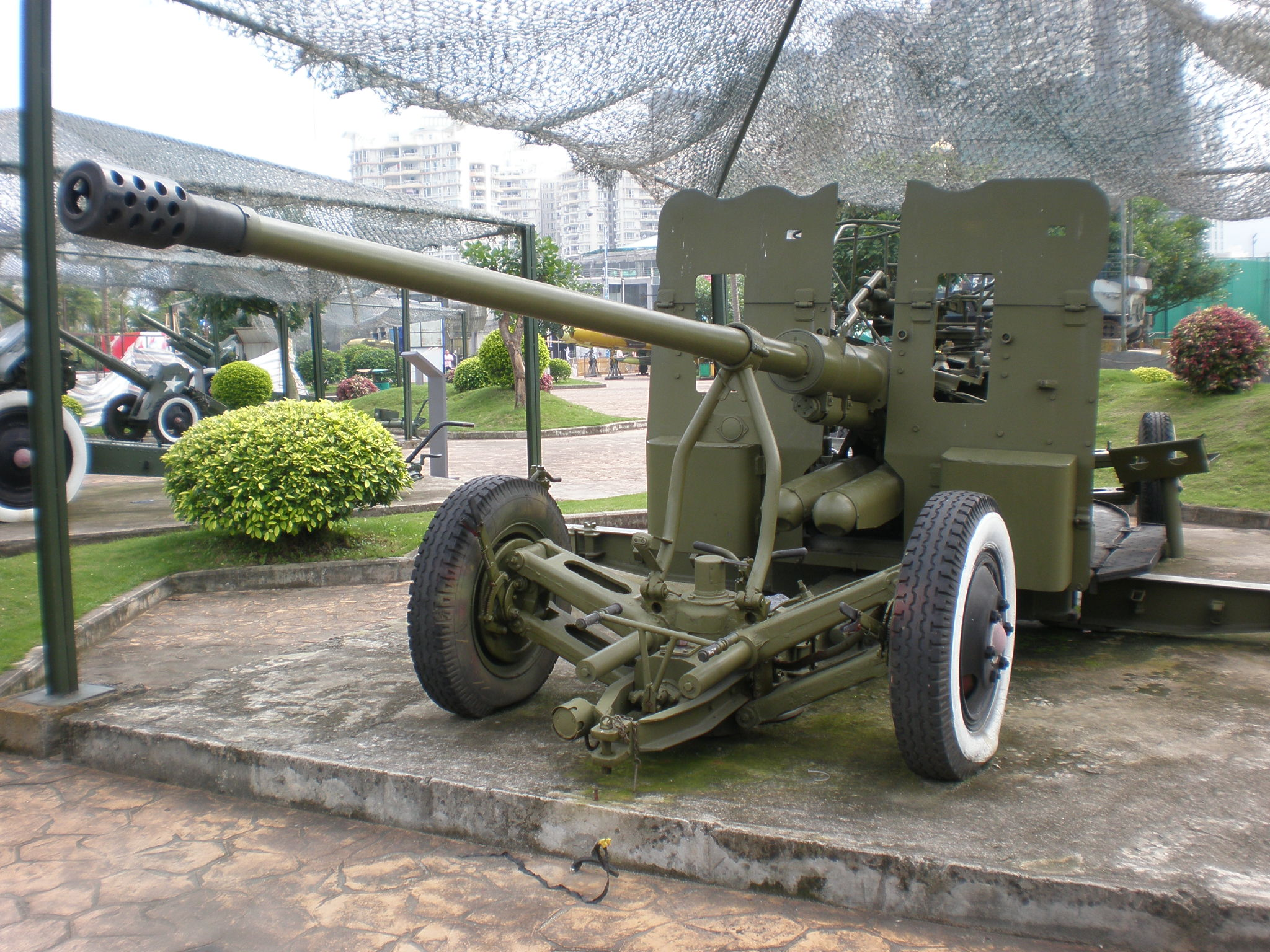
Type 59 57 mm anti-aircraft gun

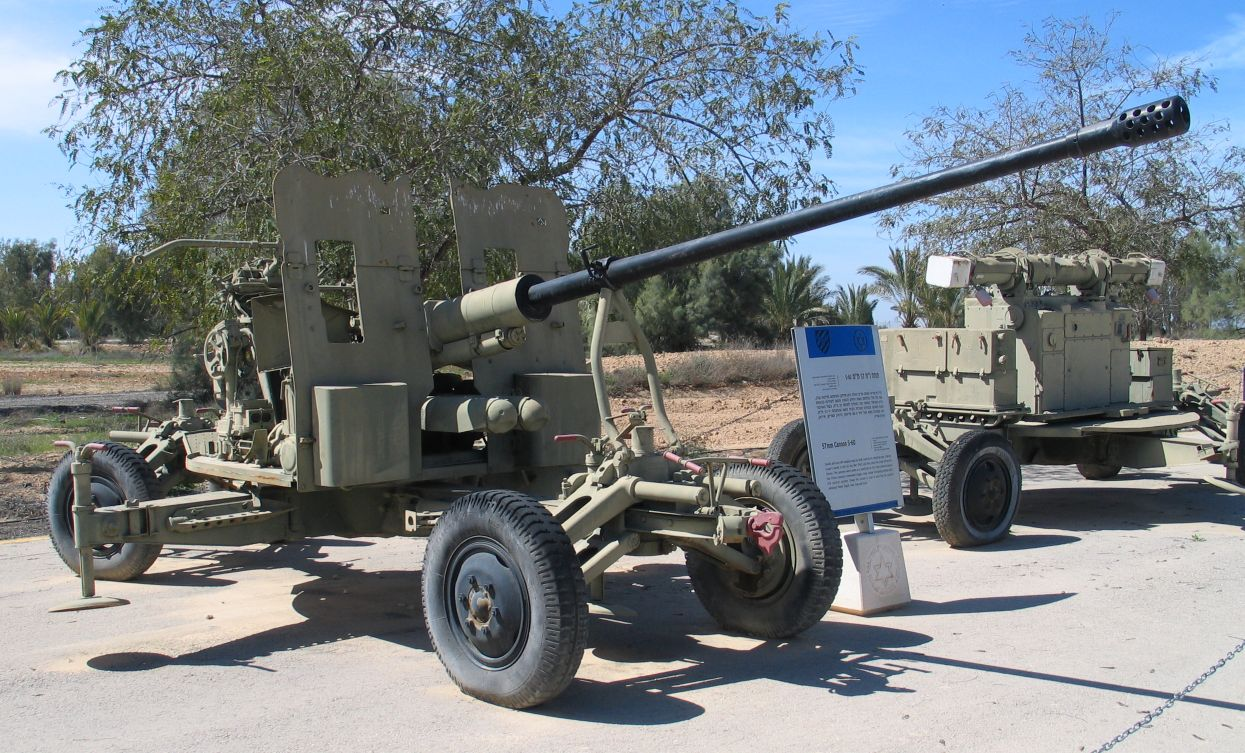
57 mm AZP S-60 air defense gun

- ZPU-1 14.5mm Single-barrelled AA autocannon
- ZPU-2 14.5mm Double-barrelled AA autocannon
- ZPU-4 14.5mm Quadruple-barrelled AA autocannon
- Vz.53 12.7 mm Quadruple-barrelled AA gun
- ZU-23-2 23 mm twin automatic anti-aircraft gun: Used by the PAVN.
- M1939 (61-K) 37 mm air defense gun: Captured from government forces. Used in small numbers.
- AZP S-60 57 mm air defense gun: Used in small numbers.
- Type 55/65 37 mm anti-aircraft gun: Chinese variant of the M1939 (61-K). Used in small numbers.
- Type 59 57 mm anti-aircraft gun: Chinese variant of the AZP S-60. Used in small numbers.

=== Vehicles ===
- T-54/55 main battle tank
- Type 59 main battle tank
- Type 62 light tank
- Type 63 amphibious light tank
- PT-76 amphibious light tank
- M24 Chaffee Light tank: Captured from government forces.
- AMX-13 Light tank: Captured from government forces.
- M113 armored personnel carrier: Captured from government forces.
- GAZ-69A (4×4) field car
- Land Rover (4×4) Series I-II: Captured from government forces.
- Willys MB ¼-ton (4×4) jeep: Captured from government forces.
- M151A1 ¼-ton (4×4) utility truck: Captured from government forces.
- M35A2 2½-ton (6×6) cargo truck: Captured from government forces.
- Jiefang CA-30 general purpose 2.5 ton (6×6) truck: Captured from government forces.
- GMC/Chevrolet C-50 medium-duty truck: Captured from government forces.
- GMC C7500 heavy-duty truck: Captured from government forces.

=== River craft ===
- Dugout canoe
- River Sampan

== See also ==
- Cambodian Civil War
- First Indochina War
- Laotian Civil War
- List of weapons of the First Indochina War
- List of weapons of the Laotian Civil War
- List of weapons of the Vietnam War
- Vietnam War
