= Swing =

Swing or swinging may refer to:

== Apparatus ==
- Swing (seat), a hanging seat that swings back and forth
- Pendulum, an object that swings
- Russian swing, a swing-like circus apparatus
- Swing ride, an amusement park ride consisting of suspended seats that rotate like a merry-go-round

== Arts, entertainment, and media ==
=== Films ===
- Swing! (1938 film), an American film directed by Oscar Micheaux
- Swing (1999 film), an American film by Nick Mead
- Swing (2002 film), a French film by Tony Gatlif
- Swing (2003 film), an American film by Martin Guigui
- Swing (2010 film), a Hindi short film
- Swing (2021 film), an American film by Michael Mailer

=== Music ===
==== Styles ====
- Swing (jazz performance style), the sense of propulsive rhythmic "feel" or "groove" in jazz
- Swing music, a style of jazz popular during the 1930s–1950s
- Swung rhythm, a rhythmic style in music

==== Groups and labels ====
- Swing (Canadian band), a Canadian néo-trad band
- Swing (Hong Kong band), a Hong Kong pop music group
- Swing Time Records, a record label

==== Albums ====
- The Swing (INXS album), a 1984 album by Australian rock band INXS
- Swing (The Manhattan Transfer album), 1997 album by The Manhattan Transfer
- Swing (soundtrack), soundtrack of the 1999 film
- Swing, a 2009 album by Christian De Sica
- Swing (Renée Geyer album), 2013 album by Renée Geyer
- Swing (EP), a 2014 album by South Korean-Chinese group, Super Junior-M

==== Songs ====
- "Swing" (Trace Adkins song), 2006, by Trace Adkins
- "Swing" (AMO song), a 2012 song by Slovak hip hop band AMO
- "Swing" (Savage song), 2005, by New Zealand performer Savage, released again in 2008 featuring Soulja Boy
- "Swing" (Sofi Tukker song), 2019
- "The Swing" (song), 1997, by American country music artist James Bonamy
- "Swing, Swing", 2003, by the All-American Rejects
- "Swing", 1980, by Japan from the album Gentlemen Take Polaroids
- "Swing", 2015, by Knuckle Puck from the album Copacetic
- "Swing", 2012, by Parkway Drive from the album Atlas
- "Swing", 2014, by Super Junior-M from the album Swing
- "Swing", 1983, by Yello
- "Swing", 2019, by Brooke Candy from the album Sexorcism

=== Other uses in arts, entertainment, and media ===
- Swing (dance), a group of dances that correspond to swing style of jazz music
- Swing (musical), a 1999 Broadway musical
- Swing (video game), a 1997 video game for the PC and PlayStation
- Swing, an understudy in the musical theatre who prepares several roles
- Swinging (TV series), an Australian kids TV series.

== Politics ==
- Swing (politics), the extent of change in voter support
  - Swing (Australian politics), refers to the extent of change in voter support, typically from one election or opinion poll to another
  - Swing (United Kingdom), an indication of the scale of voter change between two political parties
- Captain Swing, a name appended to several threatening letters during the rural English Swing Riots of 1830

== Sports ==
- Swing (boxing), a type of punch
- Baseball swing, the process of attempting to hit a ball with a bat in the game of baseball
- Golf swing or golf stroke mechanics, the means by which golfers analyze the execute their shots in the sport of golf
- Swing bowling, a subtype of fast bowling in cricket

== Transportation ==
- Aquilair Swing, a French ultralight trike aircraft design
- S-Wing Swing, light sport aircraft designed and built in the Czech Republic
- Swing Bike, a bicycle where both front and rear wheels are steerable
- Swing Flugsportgeräte, German aircraft manufacturer

== Other uses ==
- Swing (Java), a GUI widget toolkit for the Java programming language
- Swing (surname)
- Swing rifle, type of firearm
- Swing trading, when a tradable asset is held for one or more days to profit from price changes
- Swinging (sexual practice), when partners in a committed relationship engage in sexual activities with others
- The Swing Youth (German: Swingjugend), a youth counterculture of jazz and swing lovers in Nazi Germany

== See also ==
- The Swing (disambiguation)
- Swings (disambiguation)
- Swinger (disambiguation)
- Swingin' (disambiguation)
- Pendulum (disambiguation)
- Swung dash
