= Safran Electronics & Defense =

French corporation

- Type: Subsidiary
- Industry: Solutions and services in optronics, avionics, electronics and critical software for both civil and military markets.
- Founded: 2005; 21 years ago
- Headquarters: Boulogne-Billancourt, France
- Area served: Worldwide
- Revenue: €1,275 million (at 31 December 2015)
- Number of employees: 7,600 (at 31 December 2015)
- Parent: Safran
- Divisions: Avionics, Optronics, Defense
- Subsidiaries: Optics 1, Inc.; Safran REOSC; Robonic Oy; Safran Colibrys SA; Safran Electronics & Defense Asia Pte Ltd; Safran Electronics & Defense, Avionics USA, LLC; Safran Electronics & Defense Brazil Ltda; Safran Electronics & Defense Canada Inc.; safran electronics & defense Morocco Inc.; Safran Electronics & Defense Services India Pvt Ltd.; Safran Electronics & Defense Spain S.L.U.; Sagem Navigation Germany GmbH; Safran Sensing Technologies Norway AS; Vectronix AG; Vectronix Inc.; Microtecnica S.r.l
- Website: safran-electronics-defense.com

Safran Electronics & Defense, formerly known as Sagem Défense Sécurité, is a French company specializing in optronics, avionics and electronic systems, as well as software for civil and military applications in the naval, aeronautical and space sectors. It is one of the ten entities that make up the Safran Group.

== History ==
The Société d’applications générales d’électricité et de mécanique (SAGEM) was created in 1925. The company's products ranged from inertial navigation systems to fax machines. SAGEM also manufactured precision equipment for the French Navy: gyrocompasses, fire-control units, optronic equipment.

In 2003, Sagem acquired the defence optronics business of Leica Vectronix.

In 2005, SAGEM merged with the French company "Société nationale d'étude et de construction de moteurs d'aviation (SNECMA)" to form the Safran Group. Within this framework, SAGEM's activities merged with the company Sagem Défense Sécurité. In 2007, the security applications were separated off and a new company named Sagem Sécurité was created (now called Morpho). The Safran Electronics division was created in 2009, grouping together all Safran's electronic engineers. In 2011, the facility in Tarbes (south-west France), which manufactured components for the Megajoule Laser, was sold to the Alcen Group. The question of whether to merge or exchange activities with the Thales Group was regularly raised between 2004 and 2011.

On 1 January 2012, the facility in Fougères (France), formerly Sagem Industries, merged with Sagem Défense Sécurité. In the same year, Thales and Sagem acquired Areva's stake in Sofradir. Sagem owns 50% of this subsidiary which is a European leader in infrared detectors. In July, the two companies announced the creation of OPTROLEAD, a 50/50 joint-venture company working in the field of optronics.

In January 2013, the facility in Saint-Pierre-du-Perray (France) became a fully owned subsidiary of Safran Electronics & Defense. The company focuses on designing and manufacturing high-performance optics for space, astronomy, high-power lasers and the semiconductor industry.

In 2013, Sagem announced the opening of a factory in Casablanca (Morocco) to produce components for actuators and avionics equipment. On 19 May 2016, all the Group's companies took the name of Safran, and Sagem became Safran Electronics & Defense. At the end of that year, the company grouped together all its R&D and R&T activities in the north-west of Paris on the Éragny site. The same year, the company acquired Colibrys, a specialist in high-performance motion microsensors.

The company has been headed up by the following directors (in chronological order): Jacques Paccard, Jean-Paul Herteman (appointed in November 2006), Jean-Lin Fournereaux (September 2007), Philippe Petitcolin (June 2011), Bruno Even (May 2013), Martin Sion (June 2015) and Franck Saudo (April 2023).

In 2021, Safran Electronics & Defense acquired the Norwegian company Sensonor, a specialist in MEMS sensors and inertial measurement units (IMUs), which was renamed Safran Sensing Technologies Norway.

In July 2022, Safran Electronics & Defense announced the acquisition of Orolia group, a company recognized globally for its positioning, navigation and timing (PNT) and related activities, technologies and equipment.

In November 2022, it was announced Safran Electronics & Defense had acquired the Cesson-Sévigné-based space sector radio-communication and radio-navigation company, Syrlinks. In 2025, Safran Electronics & Defense and Bharat Electronics Limited (BEL), an Indian defence public sector undertaking, signed a memorandum of understanding (MoU) to establish a joint venture in India for manufacturing, customizing, selling, and maintaining the HAMMER precision-guided air-to-ground munition.

On 16 February 2026, BEL approved the Project HAMMER which includes the formation of the joint venture, a 50:50 equity Private Limited Company under the Companies Act 2013. The joint venture will operate a Centre of Excellence that will act as "technology and teaming partner for the manufacturing, supply, maintenance and repair of the Guidance Kit of the HAMMER weapon system". The JV will have a board of four directors two nominated by each BEL and SED. The primary users include the Indian Air Force and the Indian Navy. The partnership was one of the agenda during the bilateral meet between French president Emmanuel Macron and Indian prime minister Narendra Modi.

In September 2024, Safran Electronics & Defense acquired Preligens, which became Safran.ai.

In July 2025, Safran Electronics & Defense acquired the actuation and flight control business of Collins Aerospace for $1.8 billion. The business employed 4,000 people at eight sites in Europe (United Kingdom, Italy, France) as well as in Asia, the United States and India, and generated revenue of $1.55 billion and EBITDA of $130 million in 2024. Its systems are fitted to 180 aircraft programmes.

In 2026, Safran Electronics & Defense acquired Syntony, a Toulouse-based company developing satellite navigation receivers that can operate under GPS jamming and in underground environments such as metro systems.

In June 2026, Safran Electronics & Defense stated that it had increased production of the AASM guided munition sixfold since 2022, and announced a €120 million investment in its Montluçon site to triple production capacity for its hemispherical resonator gyroscope (HRG). The same year, it acquired the military satellite imagery analysis business of Kayrros, which was integrated into Safran.ai.

== Organization ==
The company currently has several sites and subsidiaries in France and abroad.

Site	Activity	Headcount
Malakoff	Headquarters	386
Dijon	Manufacturing of optronic equipment	270
Éragny	R&T/R&D in aeronautical and optronic equipment	1200
Fougères	Manufacturing of electronic boards and products	1500
Mantes-la-Ville	Manufacturing of aeronautical equipment	272
Massy	R&T/R&D in aeronautical and optronic equipment	1749
Montluçon	Manufacturing of inertial and electronic equipment, and systems integration	1800
Saint-Benoît	Manufacturing of optronic equipment	480
Valence	R&T/R&D in safety-critical electronic equipment, power electronics and microelectronics	150
Guidel	Manufacturing of emergency locator transmitters	100

== Activity ==
Safran Electronics & Defense is a technology company that develops civil and military solutions for sea, land, air and space applications.

In precision strike, Safran Electronics & Defense designs, produces and delivers the AASM Hammer guided bomb.

The company is active in resilient positioning, navigation and timing (PNT), which combines inertial, timing and other technologies to protect GPS/GNSS signals when they are available and to compensate when they are unavailable or spoofed.

For example, in the field of optronics, the company developed the non-penetrating periscope for the Barracuda submarine, the FELIN system (an integrated infantry soldier combat suite), infrared scope and cameras for helicopters and tanks, as well as the Sperwer, Patroller and Aarok drone systems.

Through Safran.ai, the company develops artificial intelligence applications for military intelligence.

In terms of avionics, the company provides numerous types of equipment, ranging from the electric flight control system for the NH90 helicopter to the information system for the Airbus A380, as well as inertial navigation systems and engine control systems. The company also supplies hydraulic actuation and flight control systems.

For the space sector, Safran manufactures high-performance space optics used on satellites such as MeteoSat and Gaia. It also offers electric propulsion systems such as the PPS-1350.

== Gallery ==
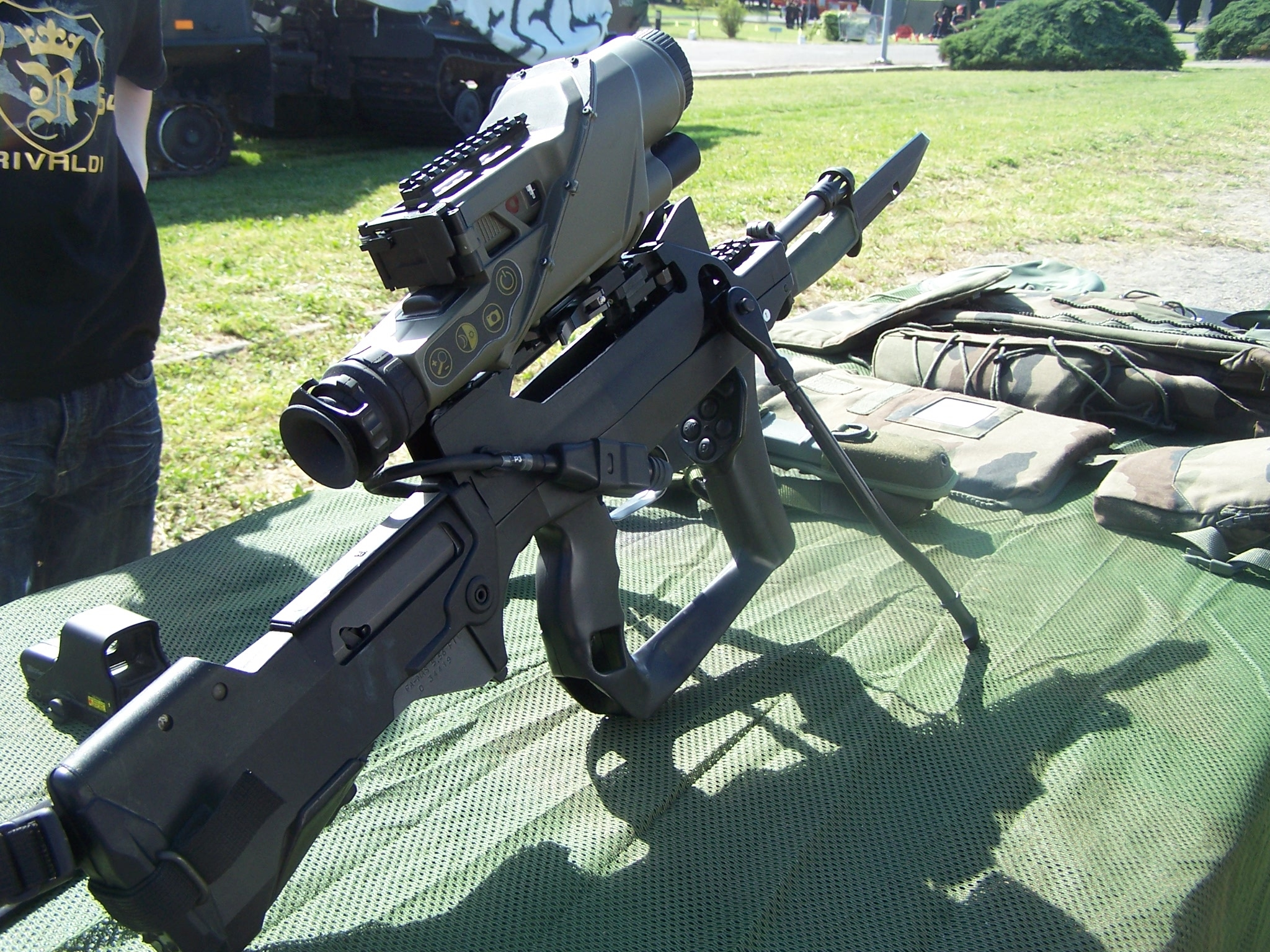
Infrared scope of the FA-MAS rifle (FÉLIN system)

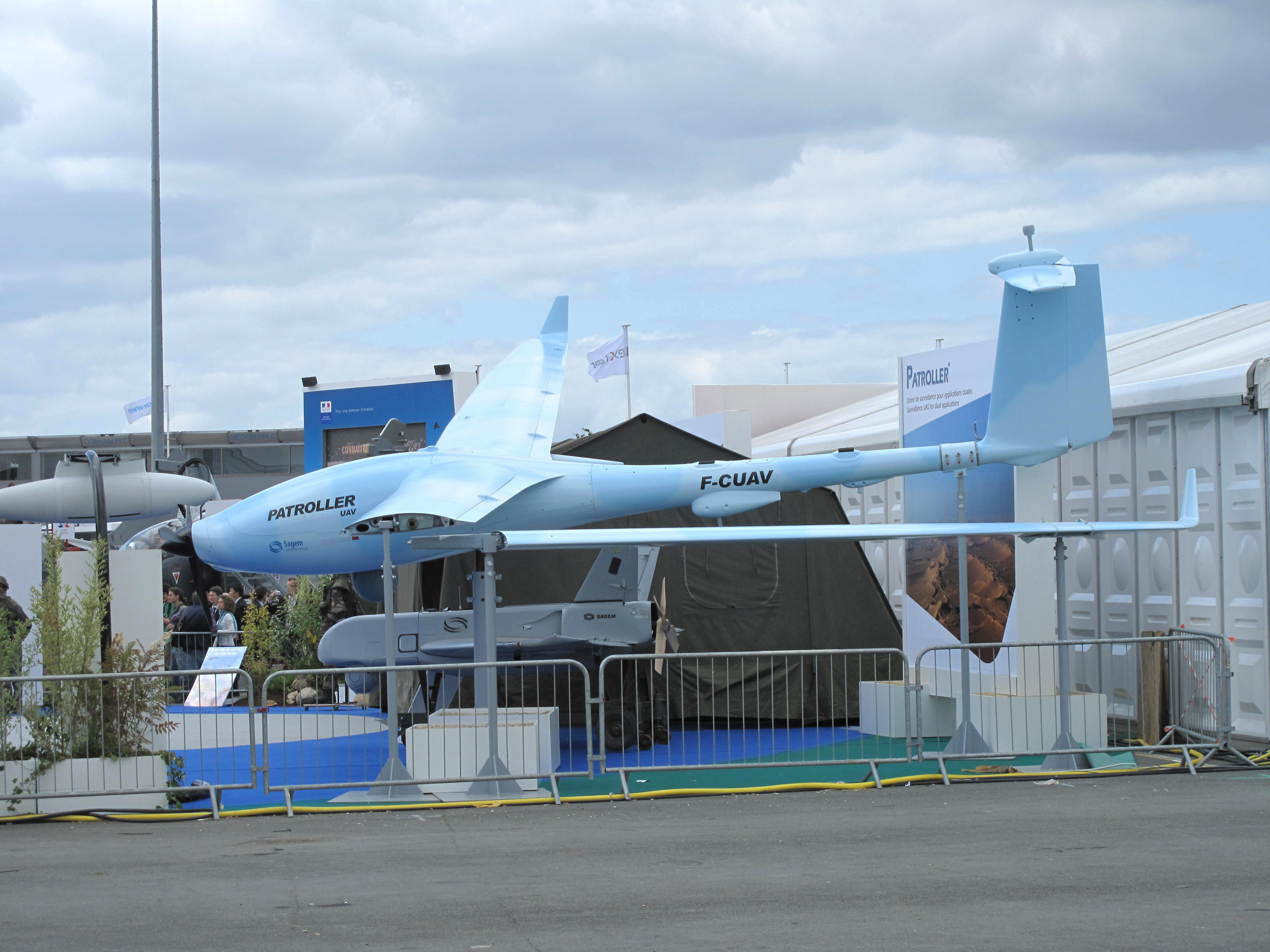
Patroller and SAGEM Sperwer drones.

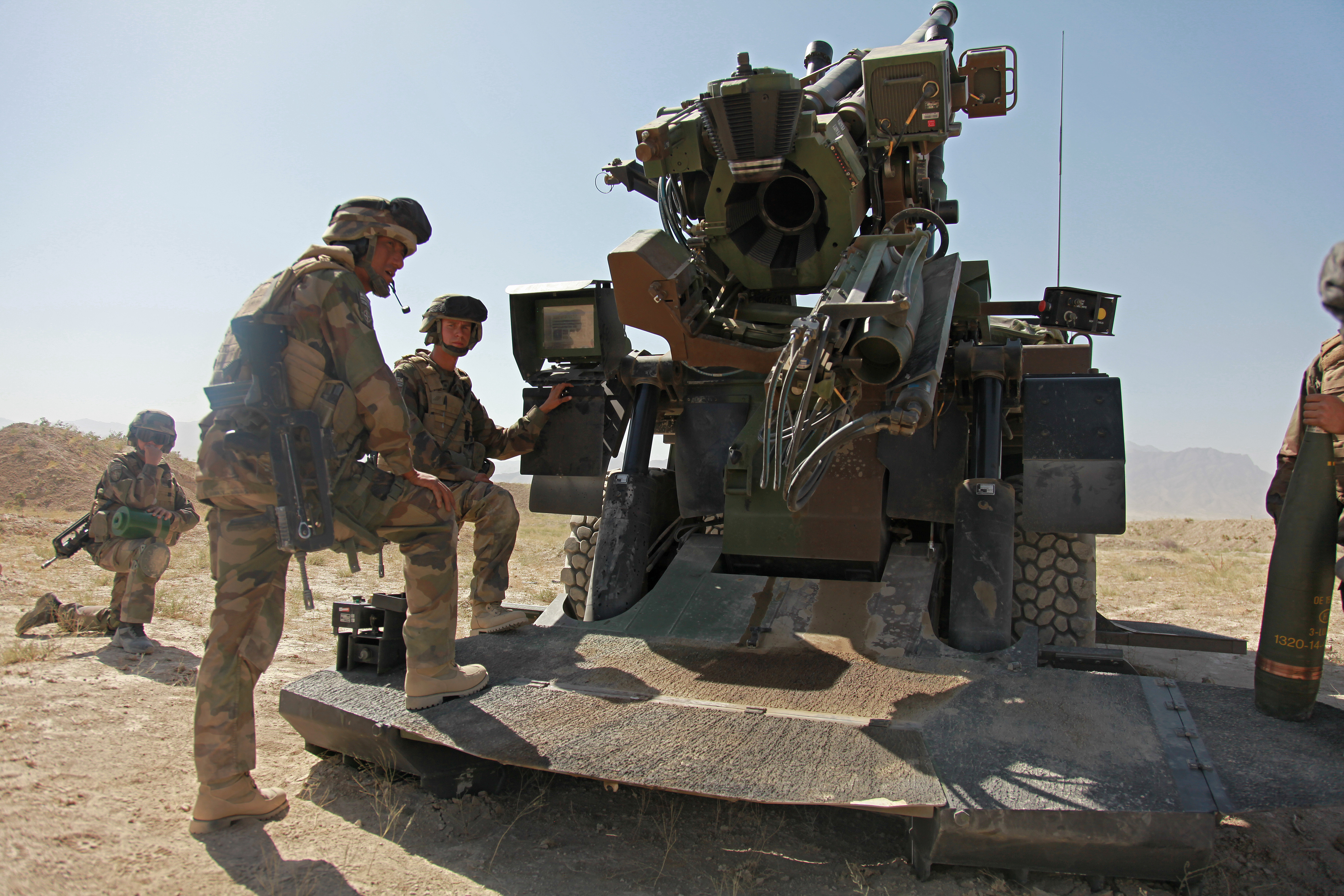
SIGMA 30 inertial unit and BIHM30 computer for the CAESAR system.

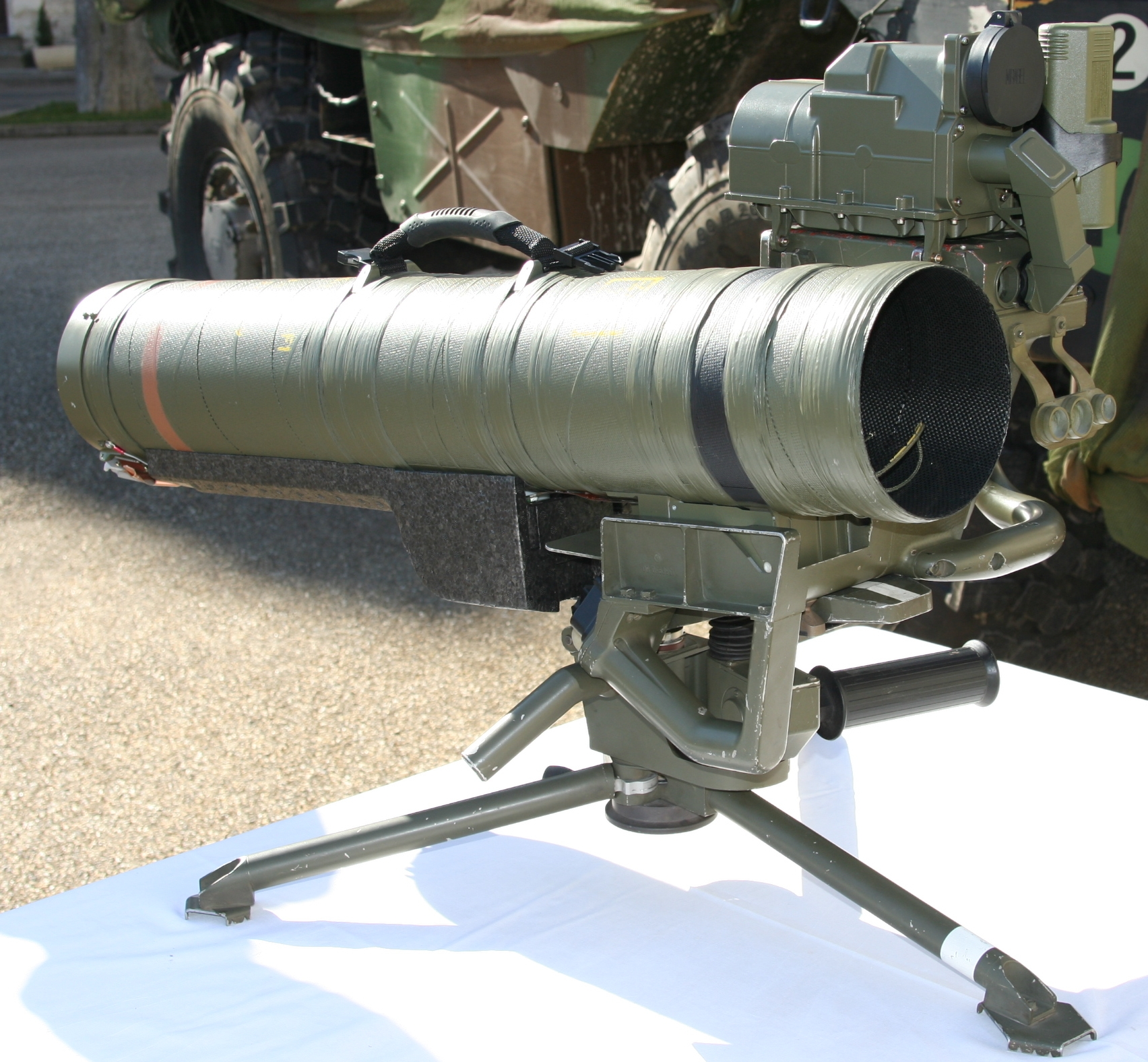
Eryx firing post with its infrared sight.
