= Mr. Swing =

Mr. Swing may refer to:

== People ==
=== As a nickname ===
- Red Norvo, an American vibraphonist
- Rufus Thomas, an American singer, songwriter, dancer, DJ, and entertainer
- Gérard Badini, a French jazz bandleader and composer

== Other uses ==
- Mr. Swing, an album by Harry Edison

== See also ==
- Swing (disambiguation)
- Swing (surname)
