= Fiat BR.20 Cicogna =

Italian medium bomber (1936–1945)

BR.20 Cicogna
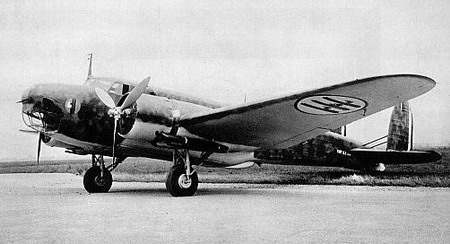
- A Fiat BR.20 on the ground just prior to Italy's declaration of war in 1940.

General information
- Type: Medium bomber
- Manufacturer: Fiat
- Designer: Celestino Rosatelli
- Primary users: Regia Aeronautica Imperial Japanese Army Air Service; Spanish Air Force
- Number built: Fiat BR.20 (233) Fiat BR.20M (279)

History
- Introduction date: 1936
- First flight: 10 February 1936
- Retired: 1945

The Fiat BR.20 Cicogna ('stork') was a low-wing twin-engine medium bomber that was developed and manufactured by Italian aircraft company Fiat Aviazione. It holds the distinction of being the first all-metal Italian bomber to enter service; it was regarded as one of the most modern medium bombers in the world.

The origins of the BR.20 were in a request issued by the Regia Aeronautica (Italian Royal Air Force) during 1934 for a new medium bomber capable of high speeds, long range, and satisfactory payload, reliability, and flight characteristics compared to contemporaries. Among the companies that chose to respond was Fiat, which completed its design for the competition during 1935. On 10 February 1936, the first prototype (serial number M.M.274) conducted its maiden flight. Flight testing proceeded at a rapid pace; during September 1936, initial deliveries of the type commenced to the Regia Aeronautica.

During summer 1937, the BR.20 received its baptism of fire when a number were operated by the Aviazione Legionaria during the Spanish Civil War: the BR.20 came to form the backbone of Nationalist bombing operations, along with the German Heinkel He 111 bomber. It was also produced under licence in Japan, and the type saw combat during the late 1930s with the Imperial Japanese Army Air Service during the Second Sino-Japanese War. During 1939, a modified long-range BR.20 version (designated BR.20L) named Santo Francesco under the command of Maner Lualdi performed a highly publicised non-stop flight from Rome to Addis Ababa, Ethiopia.

Upon the entry of Italy into the Second World War during mid-1940, the BR.20 served as the standard medium bomber of the Regia Aeronautica, by that point, the type was already approaching obsolescence. The type saw front line use during the Battle of France and the Battle of Britain. By 1942, the BR.20 was mostly used for maritime patrol and operational training for bomber crews. It was produced from the mid-1930s until the end of the Second World War. More than 500 BR.20s were built before the end of the conflict.

== Development ==
=== Background ===
During 1934, the Regia Aeronautica issued a request to Italian aviation manufacturers, asking them to submit their proposals for the production of a new medium bomber. The specifications called for it to be capable of speeds of 330 km/h (210 mph) at 4,500 m (14,800 ft) and 385 km/h (239 mph) at 5,000 m (16,000 ft), a 1,000 km (620 mi) range and 1,200 kg (2,600 lb) bombload. Various companies chose to respond, including Piaggio, Macchi, Breda, Caproni and Fiat; the majority of these offered aircraft that would have exceeded the speed requirements, but not the sought range; additionally, not all designs exhibited satisfactory flight characteristics or reliability levels.

Fiat's design team, headed by aeronautical engineer Celestino Rosatelli, set about designing a bomber that would be capable of relatively high speeds while using a simple and rugged construction and maintaining a low weight. According to aviation author G. Apostolo, the design "represented a departure from the line of aircraft previous designed by Ing. Celestino Rosatelli" and that it made use of elements of Fiat's earlier prototype civil airliner, the APR.2. The design, which later named the BR.20, was modern and competitive with other Italian bomber aircraft. The BR.20 Cicogna was amongst those proposals to be accepted by the Regia Aeronautica, together with the trimotor Savoia-Marchetti SM.79 and Cant Z.1007, thus gaining the prefix BR, (for "Bombardiere Rosatelli").

=== Into flight ===
The BR.20 moved swiftly through its design and development phases, the design being finalized during 1935. On 10 February 1936, the first prototype (serial number M.M.274) performed its maiden flight from Turin, flown by Fiat test pilot Rolandi. Following the first flight, it was transferred to Guidonia Montecelio within the Metropolitan City of Rome for an accelerated evaluation programme.

Production orders for the type were quickly placed by the Regia Aeronautica; during September 1936, initial deliveries of the BR.20 commenced to 13° Stormo Bombardamento Terrestre of the Regia Aeronautica. Testing of the aircraft continued even after this point; during June 1937, three aircraft were dispatched to a pair of bases in Benghazi and Tripoli, Libya, to conduct test flights under tropical conditions. The initial production bombers differed from the earlier prototype in various ways, particular in the finer details of the nose, fuselage and tail.

=== Cicogna vs. Sparviero ===
Despite the BR.20 being the winner of the 1934 bomber competition, the Savoia Marchetti SM.79 Sparviero, a non-competitor which was developed at practically the same time, gained a reputation that overshadowed the BR.20 Cicogna, partly because of its performance during several air races. The performance differences between the two aircraft were minimal: both were rated at about 430 km/h (270 mph) with maximum and typical payloads of 1,600 kg (3,500 lb) and 1,250 kg (2,760 lb) respectively for a range of 800–1,000 km (500–620 mi). Both bombers also possessed an assortment of three to four machine guns as defensive weapons, but almost completely lacked protective armour.

The reasons for the Sparviero's success lay in its flying characteristics. The Sparviero was a more difficult aircraft to fly with a heavier wing loading, but its three engines provided more power than the twin-engine arrangement of the BR.20. The Sparviero, weighing around the same, had a reserve of power and was capable of performing acrobatic manoeuvres, even rolls. Its engines were more reliable than those of the BR.20 and had enough power to return to base even with one shut down. The Sparviero's superior agility enabled it to perform as a torpedo-bomber, while the Cicogna was never considered for that role. Over 1,200 Sparvieros were constructed, at least twice as many as the Cicogna.

=== Further development ===
Upon its introduction, the BR.20 was a modern aircraft and benefited from a good design; the bomber quickly became obsolete in the rapid advances made in aeronautics. The scarcity of improved versions of the aircraft condemned the BR.20 to be only viable in the role of a second-line machine, being underpowered and lacking in defensive firepower by the outbreak of the Second World War. By the time Italy had entered the war, a new variant of the bomber, designated as the BR.20M, had been produced and put in service. The improved BR.20M featured a different nose with additional glazed sections for the bombardier, along with a slightly longer fuselage. The weight increased because a part of the fabric was substituted with metal, improving the resistance to flutter and vibration from the engines while reducing speed from 430 km/h (270 mph) to 410 km/h (250 mph).

The final production variant was the BR.20bis, which was a redesign of the aircraft. It featured a fully glazed nose, a retractable tail wheel, more streamlined fuselage and pointed fins, although the principal change involved was increased engine power from a pair of 932 kW (1,250 hp) Fiat A.82 RC 42 radial engines, along with an improved and heavier armament. The nose held a simple machine gun position rather than the turret used on earlier aircraft and two waist blisters were fitted over the wing trailing edge while the dorsal turret was a Breda Type V instead of the earlier Caproni Lanciani type. The BR.20bis was considered to be an improvement, particularly in its aerodynamics. Plans for production was delayed, in part due to technical problems that took time to resolve, and a decision by the Regia Aeronautica to place large orders for the competing CRDA CANT Z.1018 instead. Originally, 98 aircraft were ordered, but only 15 BR.20bis were built from March to July 1943, with severe Allied bombing of Fiat's Turin factory preventing further production. There is no evidence that any of these were used on operations.

Various experimental versions were developed. These included the BR.20C, a gunship with a 37 mm (1.5 in) cannon in the nose, while another aircraft was modified with a tricycle undercarriage. Yet another aircraft was modified to guide radio-commanded unmanned aircraft filled with explosives, but it was never used in combat. Including those bombers which had been sold to Japan, at least 233 standard BR.20s were manufactured along with an additional 264–279 BR.20Ms that were constructed from February 1940.

== Design ==
=== Overview ===
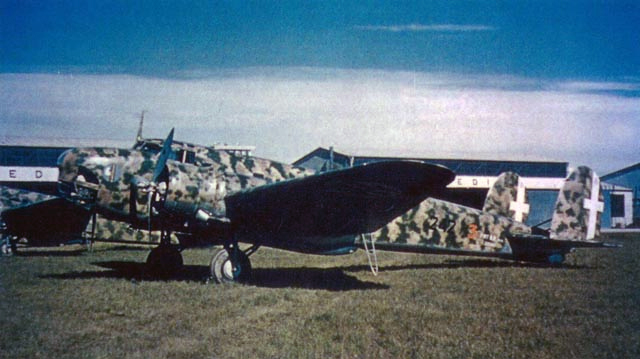
A Fiat B.R.20M of 242 Squadron, 99 Group, 43 Wing, 1940

The Fiat BR.20 was a twin-engine low-wing cantilever monoplane medium bomber. The primary mission of the aircraft was to perform medium-range bombing. The BR.20 was provided with a large number of design features that were very advanced for its time: the aircraft was capable of a maximum speed in excess of 400 km/h (250 mph) and a relatively high cruise speed of 320 km/h (200 mph), being as fast as the better of its international competitors, such as the Tupolev SB light bomber. In spite of this, the range and payload of the bomber were also comparatively favourable for the era.

The engines were a pair of Fiat A.80 RC 41 radial engines, rated at 1,000 cv at 4,100 m (13,500 ft), which drove three-bladed Fiat-Hamilton metal variable-pitch propellers. A group of six self-sealing fuel tanks, housed within the center fuselage and the inner section of the wings held a combined 3,622 L (957 US gal) of fuel, along with a pair of oil tanks which held 112 L (30 US gal). When fully loaded with a 3,600 kg (7,900 lb) payload, the bomber would have flight endurance time of 5½ hours when flown at 350 km/h (220 mph) and an altitude of 5,000 m (16,000 ft). The takeoff and landing distances were 350 m (1,150 ft) and 380 m (1,250 ft) respectively, while the theoretical ceiling was 7,600 m (24,900 ft).

=== Armament ===
In terms of its self-defence capability, the BR.20 was fitted with a Breda model H nose turret, armed with a single 7.7 mm (.303 in) Breda-SAFAT machine gun. It was initially fitted with a Breda DR dorsal turret which was furnished with either one or two 7.7 mm (.303 in) machine guns; this turret was unusual because it was semi-retractable: the gunner's view was from a small cupola, and in case of danger, the turret would then be extended. This was later replaced by a Fiat-built M.I turret armed with a 12.7 mm (.5 in) Breda machine gun, then by a Caproni-Lanciani Delta turret mounting a 12.7 mm (.5 in) Scotti machine gun (although this proved to be unreliable). It was finally replaced by a more streamlined Breda R turret, armed with a 12.7 mm (.5 in) Breda; this was a superior system that did not need any retraction mechanism because of the lower drag. In addition to this, the bomber was fitted with a 7.7 mm (.303 in) machine gun within a ventral clamshell hatch that could be opened when required. The original defensive armament weighed 220 kg (480 lb).

The offensive payload of the BR.20 was carried entirely in the bomb bay, which was isolated from the rest of the aircraft by an aluminium sheet. It could contain various armaments in the following possible combinations: 2 × 800 kg (1,760 lb) bombs as maximum load, 2 × 500 kg (1,100 lb), 4 × 250 kg (550 lb), 4 × 160 kg (350 lb), 12 × 100 kg (220 lb), 12 × 50 kg (110 lb), 12 × 20 kg (40 lb), or 12 × 15 kg (30 lb) bombs. Combinations of different types were also possible, including 1 × 800 kg (1,760 lb) and 6 × 100 kg (220 lb), 1 × 800 kg (1,760 lb) and 6 × 15 or 20 kg (30 or 40 lb), or 2 × 250 kg (550 lb) and 6 × 50 or 100 kg (110 or 220 lb) bombs. The BR.20 could also carry four dispensers, armed with up to 720 × 1 or 2 kg (2 or 4 lb) HE or incendiary bomblets. All the bombs were loaded and released horizontally, improving the accuracy of the launch. There was no torpedo armament adopted during its service life.

=== Structure ===
The BR.20 had a relatively robust main structure which featured mixed-construction; the slab-sided fuselage was composed of a welded steel tube structure. A duralumin skin of the forward and center fuselage, and fabric covering the rear fuselage. The BR.20 had 74 m^{2} (800 sq ft) metal-skinned wings, comprising a pair of spars and 50 ribs (also composed of duralumin) along with fabric-covered flight control surfaces. The wing was built in three sections, the central being integral with the fuselage and the other two being tapered outer sections. As a consequence of the low wing loading, the takeoff and landing distances were relatively short while the thickness of the wing did not compromise the achievable speed. It was also provided with a retractable main undercarriage, the elements of which would retract into the engine's nacelles via a hydraulically-actuated mechanism.

The BR.20 possessed a twin-tail configuration and a nose section that was separated into cockpit and navigator stations, while the twin tail arrangement allowed a good field of fire from the dorsal gun turret. Crewed by four or five, the BR.20's two pilots sat side by side with the engineer/radio operator/gunner behind. The radio operator's equipment included a R.A. 350-I radio-transmitter, A.R.5 receiver and P.3N radio compass. The navigator/bomb-aimer sat at a station located within the nose; this position was equipped with both bombsights and a vertical camera. Another two or three crew members occupied the nose and the mid-fuselage, performing functions as the radio-operator, navigator and gunners. The radio operator was also the ventral gunner, while the last crew member was the dorsal gunner.

== Operational history ==
=== Early service ===
When, near the end of 1936, the 13° Stormo Bombardamento Terrestre (in Lonate Pozzolo) was equipped with the "Cicognas" it was probably the most modern bombing unit in the world at that time. Shortly after entering service with the Regia Aeronautica, the aircraft became central to the propaganda campaign lauding Italian engineering. During 1937, a pair of stripped-down BR.20s, designated as the BR.20A, were custom-built for entry into the prestigious Istres–Damascus air race; these aircraft were able to obtain sixth and seventh place in the race while rivals S.M.79s achieved the first place, the Fiat-built bomber being obviously slower. The BR.20A featured a rounded nose, similar to civil aircraft, while all of the normal military hardware, such as defensive turrets, had been removed. In its place, the internal fuel capacity was increased to 7,700 L (2,000 US gal), bringing the maximum range to 6,200 km (3,900 mi).

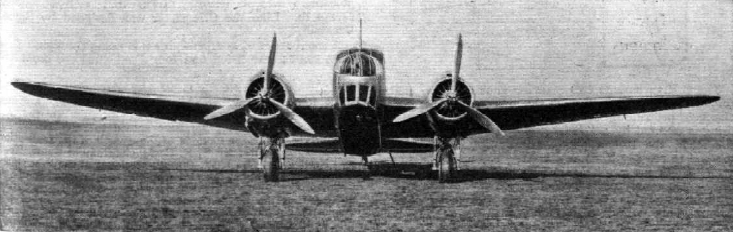
A Regia Aeronautica BR.20, 1938

During 1939, a modified long-range BR.20 version, designated as the BR.20L, named Santo Francesco under the command of Maner Lualdi performed a highly publicised non-stop flight from Rome to Addis Ababa, Ethiopia, during which an average speed of 391 km/h (243 mph) was recorded. The modified aircraft carried 5,000 L (1,300 US gal) of fuel which increased its range from 3,000 km (1,900 mi) to 4,500 km (2,800 mi). The BR.20L was also used to test a newly developed autopilot built by Microtecnica.

=== Spain ===
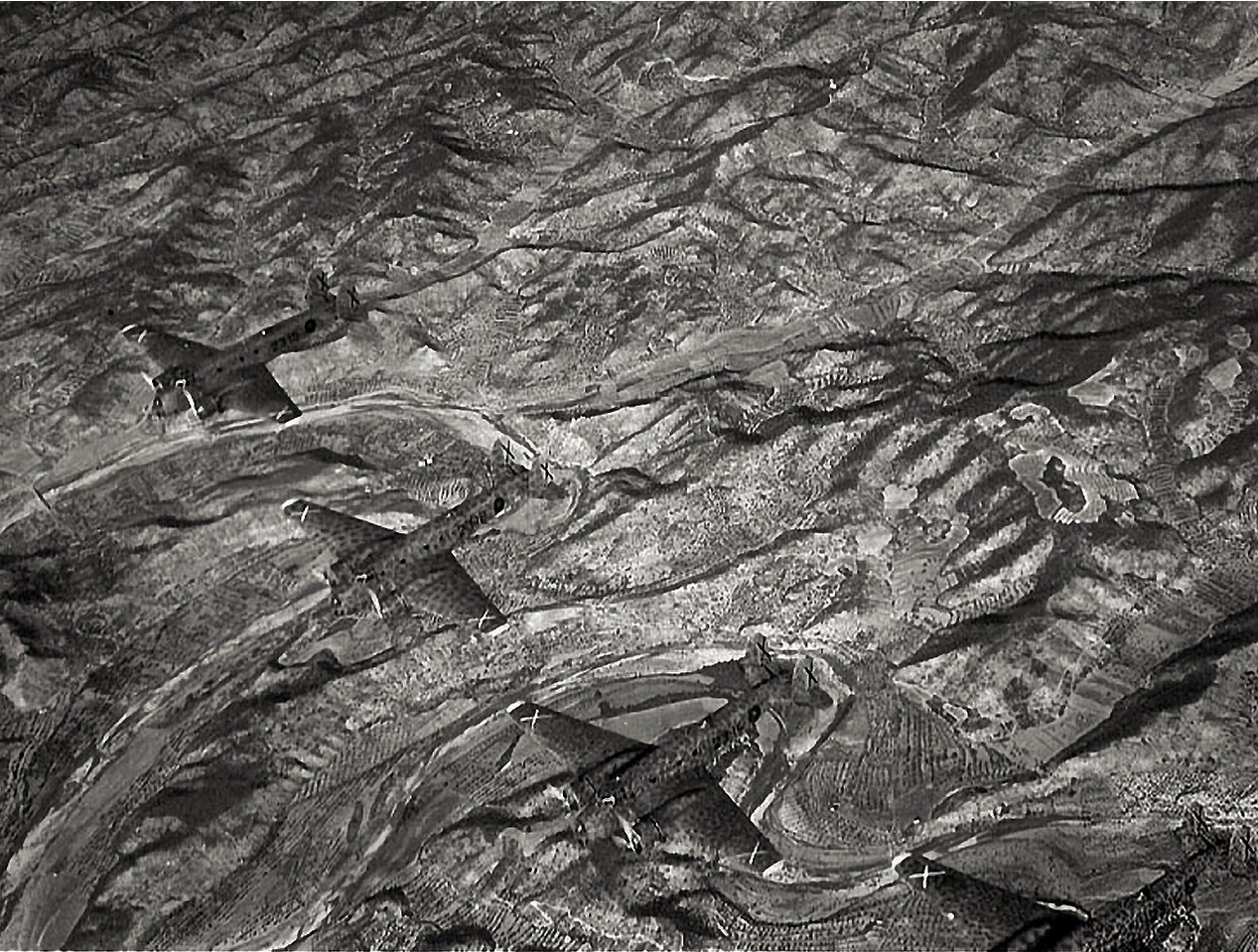
A formation of Fiat B.R.20s, June 1937. Note the camouflage blending in with the ground below

During the mid- to late- 1930s, the Spanish Civil War was waged between right-wing nationalist and left-wing Republican factions. However, the conflict quickly led to the Great Powers of the era participating to various degrees in support of their favoured side. The civil war became a testing ground for the latest military equipment of the Italians, Germans, French, British, Americans, and Soviets. As a by-product of this involvement, rapid advances in bomber development were achieved during this period.

During June 1937, Italy deployed six of its newly delivered BR.20 bombers to Tablada, outside Seville, Spain, for use by the Aviazione Legionaria as a part of its contribution in support of Francisco Franco's Nationalist forces in the Spanish Civil War. On 15 November 1937, the newly operational squadron commenced daily missions against Republican targets, usually without the support of a fighter escort. During April 1938, the bomber force flew many missions during the Battle of the Ebro. In July 1938, the BR.20's role was expanded to include photo reconnaissance missions due to the accuracy and high quality of its A.G.R.61 camera.

During July 1938, a further seven aircraft were dispatched to Spain. During the civil war, the type had frequently participated in bombing raids across various areas of the nation, including the Teruel and Ebro; during these engagements, the BR.20 proved to be a sturdy and accurate bomber. When flown at an operational altitude of 13,000 ft (4,000 m), the BR.20s were fast enough to generally avoid interception by Republican-aligned aircraft such as the Polikarpov I-15 and Polikarpov I-16 fighters that were unable to challenge the BR.20.

Losses were very low; nine of the 13 BR.20s sent to Spain survived to the end of the war when they were handed over to the Spanish State to serve with the Ejército del Aire (EdA). While the Cicogna was successful in the theatre, just 13 examples were sent to Spain compared to at least 99 SM.79s, which meant that the Sparviero was almost the Italian standard bomber, especially on day missions.

=== Japan ===
In July 1937, when Japan entered into full-scale war with China (the Second Sino-Japanese War), the Japanese Army Air Force found itself short of modern long-range bombers, pending the delivery of the Mitsubishi Ki-21 "Sally" which was undergoing prototype trials at the time, and thus required the interim purchase of aircraft from abroad. Italy was willing to give priority to any Japanese orders over its own requirements, and it offered both the Caproni Ca.135 and the BR.20 bombers in order to meet their needs.

Following an evaluation of both aircraft by the Japanese, it was determined that while the Caproni could not meet the Japanese requirements, the BR.20 closely matched the specification. In addition, the BR.20 had acquired a positive reputation as a relatively fast and durable aircraft in combat during the Spanish Civil War. Accordingly, during late 1937, an initial order was placed by Japan for 72 BR.20s; this order was soon followed by another for a further 10 bombers.

During early 1938, the first BR.20 were shipped to Dalian, Liaoning, in Japanese-controlled Northeast China, after which they were transported on for assembly and flight testing purposes. In Japanese service, the BR.20 (designated the I-Type (Yi-shiki)) was used to supplement and eventually replace the obsolete Mitsubishi Ki-1, equipping a pair of bomber groups (the 12th and 98th Sentai) located in Manchuria. The I-Type was heavily deployed on long-range bombing missions against Chinese cities and supply centers during the winter of 1938–39. The BR.20s were operating with no fighter cover at the extremes of their range and consequently incurred heavy losses from Chinese fighters, as did the early Ki-21s that shared the long-range bombing tasks.

The fabric-covered surfaces were viewed as vulnerable, even if the main structure of this aircraft was noticeably robust. Apostolo stated of the negative coverage: "This may not have in fact been true, as the BR.20s had a metal-skinned wing and not fabric covering as claimed in the Japanese Press at the time". Amongst Japanese pilots, the aircraft was considered to possess unsatisfactory range and defensive armament; however, the first Ki-21s that entered service were not much better, except for their all-metal construction and the potential for further development when better engines became available (both types initially used two 746 kW/1,000 hp engines).

The 12th Sentai was redeployed to the Mongolian-Manchurian border to fight in the Battle of Khalkhin Gol, but, when this conflict ended in September 1939, the BR.20s were progressively withdrawn and replaced by the Ki-21. Despite having been phased out from operational service, the BR.20 was allocated the Allied reporting name Ruth.

=== Second World War ===
==== France ====
Following Nazi Germany's invasion of France in May 1940, and with German forces pushing deep into France, Italy declared war upon both France and the United Kingdom on 10 June 1940. At this time, only four wings operated BR.20s compared to the 14 wings equipped with SM.79s, with 172 Cicognas being in service with the Regia Aeronautica including those not yet delivered to operational squadrons. The units equipped with the Cicogna were the 7°, 13°, 18° and 43° Stormo (Wing), all of which were based in Northern Italy; the decision to base the type in the north of the country was due to the general strength of the aircraft and its excellent flight performance upon encountering turbulence.

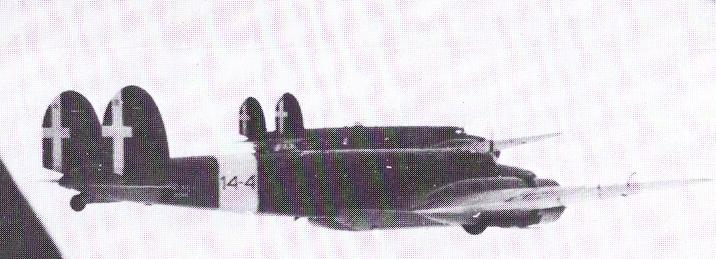
Two Fiat B.R.20 bombers in flight.

The aircraft of the 7°, 13° and 43° Stormo fought in the brief campaign against France. On the night of 12 June 1940, eight bombers from 13° attacked Toulon dockyard. The next day, 10 Fiat BR.20s dropped bombs on Hyères and Fayence airfields; two aircraft (commanded by Catalano and Sammartano) were shot down and one was badly damaged. The same day, 28 BR.20s from 43° and 7° Stormo bombed Toulon again, with no losses.

On 15 June, one BR.20M (Matricola Militare MM. 21837) of the newly formed 172a Squadriglia Ricognizione Strategica Terrestre based on Bresso airfield, was shot down over Provence by Dewoitine D.520s, the French air defenses in the south having not been defeated by the German attack in the north. Small-scale air raids continued until the French surrender, with many BR.20s also used in support for the Army—bombing Briançon, Traversette and Cap San Martin fortresses on the Alps—and as reconnaissance aircraft. At the end of the French campaign, five BR.20s had been lost and 19 airmen killed. In the immediate aftermath of the campaign, the type resumed normal training and base duties.

==== Britain ====
It was during the Battle of Britain, in which Axis aircraft flew over the English Channel to directly challenge the British mainland itself, that the BR.20 showed its limitations for the first time. On 10 September 1940, the Corpo Aereo Italiano was formed, with 13° and 43° Stormi equipped with 80 brand-new BR.20Ms, to fight in the Battle of Britain. During the ferry operation from Italy to their bases in Belgium, five aircraft crash-landed because of technical failures and a lack of navigational training, while a further 17 BR.20s were forced to land en route due to poor visibility. On the night of 24 October, the 13° and 43° took off for their first bombing mission, over Harwich, deploying eight BR.20s each. One bomber crashed on takeoff, as a result of engine failure, while two more got lost on their return, failing to find their airfield and their crews bailing out. On 29 October, 15 aircraft of 43° Stormo bombed Ramsgate, in daylight, with no loss.

During a famous battle on 11 November, a formation of 10 BR.20s from 43° Stormo, escorted by Fiat CR.42 biplane fighters – but not by the Fiat G.50s – on a daylight raid on Harwich, was intercepted by Royal Air Force (RAF) Hawker Hurricane fighters. Despite the escort, three bombers were downed (together with three CR.42s) and three more damaged, with no loss to the Hurricanes. British Prime Minister Winston Churchill commented on this raid, which occurred on the same day as the Fleet Air Arm's attack on Taranto: "They might have found better employment defending their Fleet at Taranto."

The BR.20s of the Corpo Aereo Italiano nevertheless bombed both Ipswich and Harwich on the nights of 5, 17, 20, 29 November, three times in December and twice at the beginning of January, with no losses suffered. On 10 January 1941, the 43° Stormo flew back to Italy, followed by the 13° before the end of the month as the Axis bombing campaign dwindled. During 12 days of bombing missions, the "Cicognas" dropped 54,320 kg (119,755 lbs); three aircraft were lost to enemy fire, 17 more for other reasons and 15 airmen were killed. Almost 200 modern aircraft were engaged in the campaign, which involved an opportunity cost in the form of weakening the Regia Aeronautica's presence in the Mediterranean.

==== North Africa ====
On 27 February 1941, 14 Cicogne of 98° Gruppo, 43° Stormo, that had been in service with Corpo Aereo Italiano in Belgium, led by commander De Wittembeschi, left Italy bound for Tripolitania, in Libya. On 11 March, they landed on Castel Benito airfield; subsequently, they were allocated to Bir Dufan base, where they replaced the Savoia-Marchetti SM.81 in the night-bomber role. In this theatre, the BR.20 was tasked with bombing the British forces, in particular the key port of Tobruk and the vital supply lines, in preparation for a major joint offensive by Italian and Germany forces.

While North Africa was never considered to have been a primary theater for the Cicogna, 13 Stormo (Wing) was deployed there to continue the night attacks against the British between July 1941 and April 1942. However, due to Italian industry struggling to produce aircraft to meet demands, the strategic capabilities of the Regia Aeronautica was increasingly restricted from mid-1941 onwards.

One of the last sorties occurred on 7 March 1942, when two BR.20s strafed Arab troops serving with the British forces near Oberdan village; subsequently, 11° and 43° Gruppi started their withdrawal to the Italian mainland. By 12 April, the whole Stormo was back to Reggio Emilia base: during the African campaign, with the type suffering many mechanical troubles because of the desert sand, losses amounted to 15 Cicogne. The last use over Africa was when 55° Gruppo aircraft contested Operation Torch.

==== Malta ====
BR.20s were used in the Malta campaign in 1941, 1942 and 1943. On 7 May 1941, 19° Gruppo from 43° Stormo, left Lonate Pozzolo with eight aircraft and arrived in Gerbini, Sicily. On 22 May, the BR.20s started to carry out raids against the besieged island almost nightly. While British fighter defences were initially weakened, operational effectiveness was regained via the adoption of improved anti-bomber combat techniques, which involved pursuing the bombers but only engaging them directly at critical phases of the flight.

Consequently, the first BR.20 loss occurred on 8 of June. On 9 June, the 31° Gruppo arrived from Aviano, equipped with a total of 18 bombers, but, in less than three months, the units had lost 12 BR.20s. In addition to bombing missions, the BR.20s also performed anti-submarine patrols in the theatre. During October, the 37° Stormo arrived in Sicily with the 116° Gruppo, based on Fontanarossa airfield, and the 55° Gruppo, in Gerbini. But within the first month those units too lost nine aircraft as a result of accidents or to enemy fire.

The attrition rate of the bombers remained relatively high; as such, BR.20-equipped units continued to be rotated to bases on Sicily to continue the offensive against Malta though 1941 and 1942. On 1 May 1942, the 88° Gruppo landed in Castelvetrano with 17 new machines (one crash landed on the Appennini Mountains); the units started operational service on 8 May, dropping 4AR mines. Before the end of August, five aircraft were lost and that same month the BR.20s departed Sicily. In the 16 months of their Malta campaign, 41 "Cicognas" were shot down or lost through accidents. The Fiat bombers returned for a short time in 1943 with attacks on Malta.

==== Soviet Union ====
Several BR.20s were sent to the Soviet Union in August 1942, to perform long-range reconnaissance and bombing sortie in support of CSIR, Italian Army on Eastern Front. On 3 August 1941, two BR-20s arrived in Ukraine and were assigned to 38a Squadriglia osservazione aerea (reconnaissance squadron) of 71° Gruppo. Three days later they had their baptism of fire, bombing enemy troops at Werch Mamor, along Don river. More BR.20s arrived on 5 September from 43° Stormo. Three of them were assigned to 116a Squadriglia. They usually flew lone bombing sorties, carrying 36 small-baskets of incendiary bombs to drop on enemy troops in urban areas. On 5 October, three Mikoyan Mig-1s and a Yakovlev Yak-1 attacked the BR.20 flown by Capitano Emilio d'Emilei. The Fiat crew claimed two Soviet fighters and the bomber managed to land back to airfield, in Kantemirovka, in Voronezh Oblast, but the pilot was wounded. The BR.20s were withdrawn from eastern Front in spring 1943, at first to Odessa and, subsequently, to Italy, on 13 April.

==== Other fronts ====
Fiat BR.20s over Yugoslavia.

During the course of the war, BR.20s were used in Albania and Greece as well. They were also used extensively in Yugoslavia against Josip Broz Tito's partisans. Other BR.20s were used to drop food and other material to the Italian Army, often trapped in the Balkans, faced with Yugoslavian resistance.

After the first year of war, the limitations of this type were evident. It was highly vulnerable to enemy attacks, as Japanese experience had shown in 1938, and the aircraft was replaced by the Cant Z.1007 and Savoia-Marchetti SM.84 in almost all operational units that had employed the BR.20. By 1943, when the Italian armistice was signed, many had been relegated to training, although 81 were with operational units, mostly in the Balkans and Italy; also later serving on the Eastern Front.

Italy invaded Greece in October 1940, and deployed increasing numbers of BR.20s in attacks on Greece from bases in Italy and Albania in support of the Italian Army while it was being driven back into Albania. They were involved in heavy battles with the Greeks and British, often facing fierce RAF opposition, as happened on 27 February 1941, when four BR.20s were lost or heavily damaged. This force was redeployed against Yugoslavia during the more successful German and Italian invasion in April 1941, using a strong detachment (131 aircraft) in four groups.

While the main frontline task remained that of night bombing, especially against Malta, other roles included reconnaissance and the escort of convoys in the Mediterranean. For escort duties, aircraft were fitted with bombs and possibly depth charges, but with no other special equipment. They were used in this role from 1941, with 37° Wing (Lecce), 13° Wing (end of 1942), 116°, 32 Group (Iesi, from 1943), and 98° (based in Libya) from 1941. One of the 55° aircraft was lost in August 1941 against British torpedo bombers, while between 9 August–11 September 1941, 98° escorted 172 ships from Italy to Libya. In almost all these units, the Cicogna was operated together with other aircraft, such as the Caproni Ca.314. This escort task was quite effective, at least psychologically, although the Cicogna was hampered by the lack of special equipment and, consequently, no submarines were sunk.

At the time of the September 1943 Armistice between Italy and the Allies, 67 BR.20s were operational with frontline operational units, mainly being used on anti-partisan operations, although most aircraft had been relegated to the training role. During the final years of the war, some surviving aircraft remained in use as trainers and transports. A small number were used by the RSI after the Armistice, with only one retained by the Italian Co-Belligerent Air Force, which used it for communications duties. The last BR.20 was retired on 7 June 1946 and none survive today.

== Variants ==
BR.20
Initial production model, 233 built.
BR.20A
De-militarised conversion of two BR.20s for air racing.
BR.20L
Long ranged civil version, one built.
BR.20M
Improved bomber version with lengthened nose, 264 produced.
BR.20C
Single aircraft converted by Agusta fitted with 37 mm (1.46 in) cannon in revised nose.
BR.20bis
Major re-design with more powerful engines (two Fiat A.82 RC.42 rated at 932 kW/1,250 hp each), increased dimensions and new, fully glazed nose. An improvement in defensive armament with the addition of two 12.7mm rear side machine guns. Only 15 were built.

== Operators ==
China

- A single captured BR.20 entered service with the Republic of China Air Force in 1939.

Kingdom of Italy

- Regia Aeronautica
- Aviazione Legionaria
- Italian Co-Belligerent Air Force

Italy

- Aeronautica Nazionale Repubblicana

Japan

- Imperial Japanese Army Air Service

Spanish State

- Spanish Air Force

Hungary

- Royal Hungarian Air Force

Croatia

- Air Force of the Independent State of Croatia

Venezuela

- Venezuelan Air Force – A single BR.20 was sold to Venezuela.

== Specifications (Fiat BR.20M) ==

Data from The Encyclopedia of Weapons of World War II, The Fiat B.R.20: Aircraft Profile No. 110

General characteristics

- Crew: 5
- Length: 16.68 m (54 ft 9 in)
- Wingspan: 21.56 m (70 ft 9 in)
- Height: 4.75 m (15 ft 7 in)
- Wing area: 74 m^{2} (800 sq ft)
- Empty weight: 6,500 kg (14,330 lb)
- Max takeoff weight: 10,100 kg (22,267 lb)
- Powerplant: 2 × Fiat A.80 R.C.41 18-cylinder air-cooled radial piston engine, 746 kW (1,000 hp) each
- Propellers: 3-bladed variable-pitch propellers

Performance

- Maximum speed: 440 km/h (270 mph, 240 kn)
- Cruise speed: 340 km/h (210 mph, 180 kn)
- Range: 2,750 km (1,710 mi, 1,480 nmi)
- Service ceiling: 8,000 m (26,000 ft)

Armament

- Guns: 3 × 12.7 mm (.5 in) Breda-SAFAT machine guns
- Bombs: 1,600 kg (3,500 lb) of bombs

== See also ==
Aircraft of comparable role, configuration, and era

- Bloch MB.210
- Douglas B-18 Bolo
- Heinkel He 111
- Ilyushin DB-3
- Junkers Ju 86
- Martin B-10
- Mitsubishi G3M
- Mitsubishi Ki-21
- Savoia-Marchetti SM.79 Sparviero

Related lists

- List of aircraft of World War II
- List of bomber aircraft
- List of interwar military aircraft
- List of Regia Aeronautica aircraft used in World War II
