= Abhinav =

Abhinava (Devanagari: अभिनव) is an Indian male given name. The Sanskrit word abhinava has the meaning "new". Abhinava also means innovative, young, modern, fresh.

== Notable people ==
Notable people with the name include:

- Abhinavagupta (c. 950–1016), Kashmiri philosopher
- Abhinav Bali (born 1985), Indian cricketer
- Abhinav Bindra (born 1982), Indian shooter and Olympic champion
- Abhinav Gomatam, Indian Telugu-language film actor
- Abhinav Kamal (born 1984), Indian entrepreneur and film director
- Abhinav Kashyap (born 1974), Indian film director and screenwriter
- Abhinav Mukund (born 1990), Indian cricketer
- Abhinav Puri (born 1994), Indian cricketer
- Abhinav Shukla (producer), Indian film and television show producer
- Abhinava Vidyatirtha (1917–1989), Indian spiritual leader
- Dev (Tamil actor), Indian film actor and content producer who was credited as Abhinav until 2019
