= The Swing =

The Swing may refer to:

== Music ==
- The Swing (album), by INXS, or the title song, 1984
- "The Swing" (song), by James Bonamy, 1997

== Paintings ==
- The Swing (Fragonard), an oil painting by Jean-Honoré Fragonard, 1767
- The Swing (Goya), a tapestry cartoon by Francisco Goya, 1779
- The Swing (Renoir), an oil painting by Pierre-Auguste Renoir, 1876
- The Swing (Dinet), an oil painting by Nasreddine Dinet, 1899

== Other uses ==
- The Swing (film), a 1983 German film
- "The Swing", a poem by Robert Louis Stevenson published in A Child's Garden of Verses, 1885

== See also ==
- Swing (disambiguation)
