= Swings =

Swings may refer to:

- Swing (seat) (often referred to as "swings"), playground equipment
- Swings (rapper) (born 1986), South Korean rapper
- Pol Swings (1906–1983), astrophysicist
- Bart Swings (born 1991), Belgian speed skater

== See also ==
- Swing (disambiguation)
