= Safran Sensing Technologies Norway =

Safran Sensing Technologies Norway AS
- Company type: Private company
- Industry: MEMS
- Founded: 1985
- Headquarters: Horten, Norway
- Products: Gyros, IMUs, pressure sensors
- Revenue: ▲163.9 million NOK (2020)
- Net income: ▲35.0 million NOK (2020)
- Number of employees: 63
- Website: www.sensonor.com

Safran Sensing Technologies Norway AS (formerly Sensonor AS) is a French-owned Norwegian producer and developer of high precision and light-weight MEMS gyros and IMUs, and also offers foundry services in its wafer fab. The CEO is Valérie Redron.

As of 1 October 2021, Sensonor is a fully owned and integrated subsidiary of Safran Electronics & Defense. On 21 April 2022, the company changed its name to Safran Sensing Technologies Norway AS. The Swiss company Colibrys changed their name to Safran Sensing Technologies Switzerland SA at the same time.

== Business ==
The main product of Sensonor has long been MEMS manufactured pressure sensors, gyros and inertial measurement systems. The company has focused on MEMS gyros since 2009, and the main product line consists of gyros (STIM2xx product line), and IMU (STIM3xx product line), which both include hermetic versions for space applications. Since 2019, Sensonor has also offered foundry services in its wafer fab.

== History ==
The company was first established in Horten in 1985, founded on knowledge and research from Akers Electronics.

In the 1990s Sensonor had international success with SA20, a sensor for airbag systems. It was based on a piezoresistive beam of silicon. Around 35 million sensors were sold worldwide, and the company had an estimated 60–70% of the European market for airbag sensors.

However, SA30, their next generation of the crash sensor, was delayed, and failed commercially. This led to a decrease in the revenues from 170m NOK in 1997 to 50m NOK in 1999. Thus, the early 2000s were economically difficult years for the business and stock market speculation increased the instabilities.

Eventually, Sensonor was purchased in full by the large German semiconductor company Infineon Technologies. Sensonor was owned by them from June 2003 until February 2009, under the name Infineon Technologies SensoNor. In this period, the company was world leading in the TPMS market. In parallel with the development of the SA30 sensor, Sensonor had also been working on a pressure sensor, named SP12. It was designed for usage in TPMS applications, i.e. monitoring of the air pressure in car tires. As with earlier products, SP12 was also based on piezoresistive elements implanted in a silicon crystal, but additionally, the silicon wafer was encapsulated between two Pyrex glass wafers. It was this technology which made the Norwegian company an interesting investment for Infineon.

Later, Sensonor developed improved versions, SP30 and SP35. These were sold to producers of TPMS-systems by Infineon. In February 2009, Infineon announced that Sensonor were to be sold to Norwegian private investors, in a move that would "benefit both SensoNor and Infineon".

In February 2012, the company filed for bankruptcy, but already in April 2012, new owners purchased the estate and reestablished the company.

The company filed positive results and growing sales every year from 2015 to 2020, except 2017.

On 1 October 2021, the company was purchased in full by Safran Electronics & Defense.

Name- and ownership history
Years	Name	Type	Owners
1985-2003	Sensonor ASA	Public company	(Norway) Traders on Oslo Stock Exchange
2003-2009	Infineon Technologies Sensonor AS	Private company	(Germany) Infineon
2009-2012	Sensonor Technologies AS	Private company	(Norway) Harald Høegh and others
2012-2021	Sensonor AS	Private company	(Norway) / (Switzerland) Sensonor Holding (Thomas Bull-Larsen and others)
2021-	Safran Sensing Technologies Norway AS	Private company	(France) Safran Electronics & Defense

== Products ==
Sensonor sells three-axis gyros and IMUS (devices with gyro, accelerator and/or inclinometer sensors) in a small package. The gyros belong to the STIM2xx-series, while the IMUS are in the STIM3xx-series. The original product was the STIM202/STIM210 and the STIM300. The STIM318 has improved accelerometer performance, while the STIM277H/377H products are hermetic and optimized for use in Low Earth Orbit.
