= Schwinger =

Schwinger can refer to:

- Gene Schwinger (1932–2020), American basketball player
- Julian Schwinger (1918–1994), a physicist
  - the Schwinger model, which he created
- a song by the German band Seeed, from their album Next!
- a participant in schwingen wrestling

== See also ==
- Swinger (disambiguation)
