= Swing (2010 film) =

- Directed by: Abhinav Kamal
- Written by: Abhinav Kamal
- Screenplay by: Abhinav Kamal
- Produced by: TenMotion
- Starring: Amrita
- Cinematography: Rajesh K
- Edited by: Abhinav Kamal
- Release date: 2010
- Running time: 3 minutes 30 seconds
- Country: India
- Language: Hindi
- Budget: 200 INR

Swing is a 2010 short film on anti-smoking directed by Abhinav Kamal. The film stars Amrita Neve in the female lead. DOP of the film has been carried out by Rajesh K.

The film received the Best Short Film Award in the festival Hollywood Boulevard conducted in connection with Liba Chrysalis, LIBA Chennai. The film was judged by Tamil film actor director Cheran. The film was produced by Ten Motion Arts.
