= Pendulum (disambiguation) =

A pendulum is a body suspended from a fixed support so that it swings freely back and forth under the influence of gravity.

Pendulum may also refer to:

== Devices ==
- Pendulum (mechanics), the physical and mathematical principles of a pendulum
- Pendulum clock, a kind of clock that uses a pendulum to keep time
- Pendulum car, an experimental tilting train
- Foucault pendulum, a pendulum that demonstrates the Earth's rotation
- Spherical pendulum
- Spring pendulum
- Conical pendulum
- Centrifugal pendulum absorber, torsional vibration reduction by using a pendulum principle
- For other types and uses of pendulums, see: Category:Pendulums
- Pendulum (torture device), a device allegedly used by the Spanish Inquisition
- Pendulum Instruments, a Swedish manufacturer of scientific instruments

== Music ==
- Pendulum (drum and bass band), an Australian electronic rock group formed in 2002
- Pendulum (ambient band), an Australian house music group formed in 1994

=== Albums ===
- Pendulum (Broadcast EP), and its title track
- Pendulum (Creedence Clearwater Revival album)
- Pendulum (Dave Liebman album), and its title track
- Pendulum (Eberhard Weber album), and its title track
- Pendulum (Lowen & Navarro album), and its title track
- Pendulum (Tara Simmons EP), and its title track
- The Pendulum, a comic book miniseries based on Insane Clown Posse's Dark Carnival universe, and associated songs and album

=== Songs ===
- "Pendulum" (song), by FKA Twigs
- "Pendulum", by Embodyment from the album The Narrow Scope of Things
- "Pendulum", by Fleshgod Apocalypse from the album Opera
- "Pendulum", by Katy Perry from the album Witness
- "Pendulum", by Phinehas from the album Thegodmachine
- "Pendulums", by Sarah Harmer from the album All of Our Names
- "Penduli Pendulum", by Bobbie Gentry from The Delta Sweete
- "The Pendulum Song", song written by Al Hoffman and John Murray
- Pendulum Music, a composition by Steve Reich involving microphones swinging above speakers like pendulums

== Books and periodicals ==
- Pendulum, by John Christopher, 1968
- The Pendulum, by Annie S. Swan, 1972
- Pendulum, by A. E. Van Vogt, 1978
- Pendulum, by Adam Hamdy, 2017
- The Pendulum, a student newspaper at Elon University
- The Pendulum, a publication devoted to radiesthesia

== Film ==
- Pendulum (1969 film), an American neo noir film starring George Peppard
- Pendulum, a 2001 film starring Rachel Hunter and James Russo
- Pendulum (2014 film), an Indian Bengali-language film by Soukarya Ghosal
- Pendulum (2023 film), an Indian Malayalam-language fantasy thriller film by Rejin S. Babu
- Pendulum (2027 film), an American horror film starring Joseph Gordon-Levitt
- Pendular (film), a Brazilian drama film

== Other ==
- Pendulum, a trade name for the preemergent herbicide pendimethalin
- Pendulum, several types of Digimon virtual pets
- Mackerras pendulum, an electoral tool for describing the swing required for a change of government
