= Swingin' =

Swingin' may refer to:

== Music ==
=== Albums ===
- Swingin' (Dino album)
- Swingin' (Arturo Sandoval album)
- Swingin' (Kenny Burrell album)
- Swingin', a 1984 Big Jay McNeely album of 1957-1961 recordings, and unreleased studio material
- Swingin' Johnny Dorelli 2004/2007
- Swingin' (Karin Krog album)
- Swing'n, 1993 album by Hi-C

=== Songs ===
- "Swingin'", single by The Johnny Dankworth Seven, Parlophone 1953
- "Swingin'", single by jazz clarinetist Edmond Hall, Top Rank, 1960
- "Swingin'", single by Light of the World, Ensign, 1979
- "Swingin'" (John Anderson song) 1982 song, covered by Billy Jo Spears and LeAnn Rimes
- "Swingin'" (Tom Petty and the Heartbreakers song), 1999 song
- "Swinging", 1981 single by New Zealand band The Swingers

== See also ==
- "Swangin", 2013 song by Stalley
- Swing (disambiguation)
- Swinging with the Finkels, a 2011 British film
- Swinging (sexual practice)
- Swinger (disambiguation)
