= Fiat APR.2 =

Italian prototype airliner

APR.2
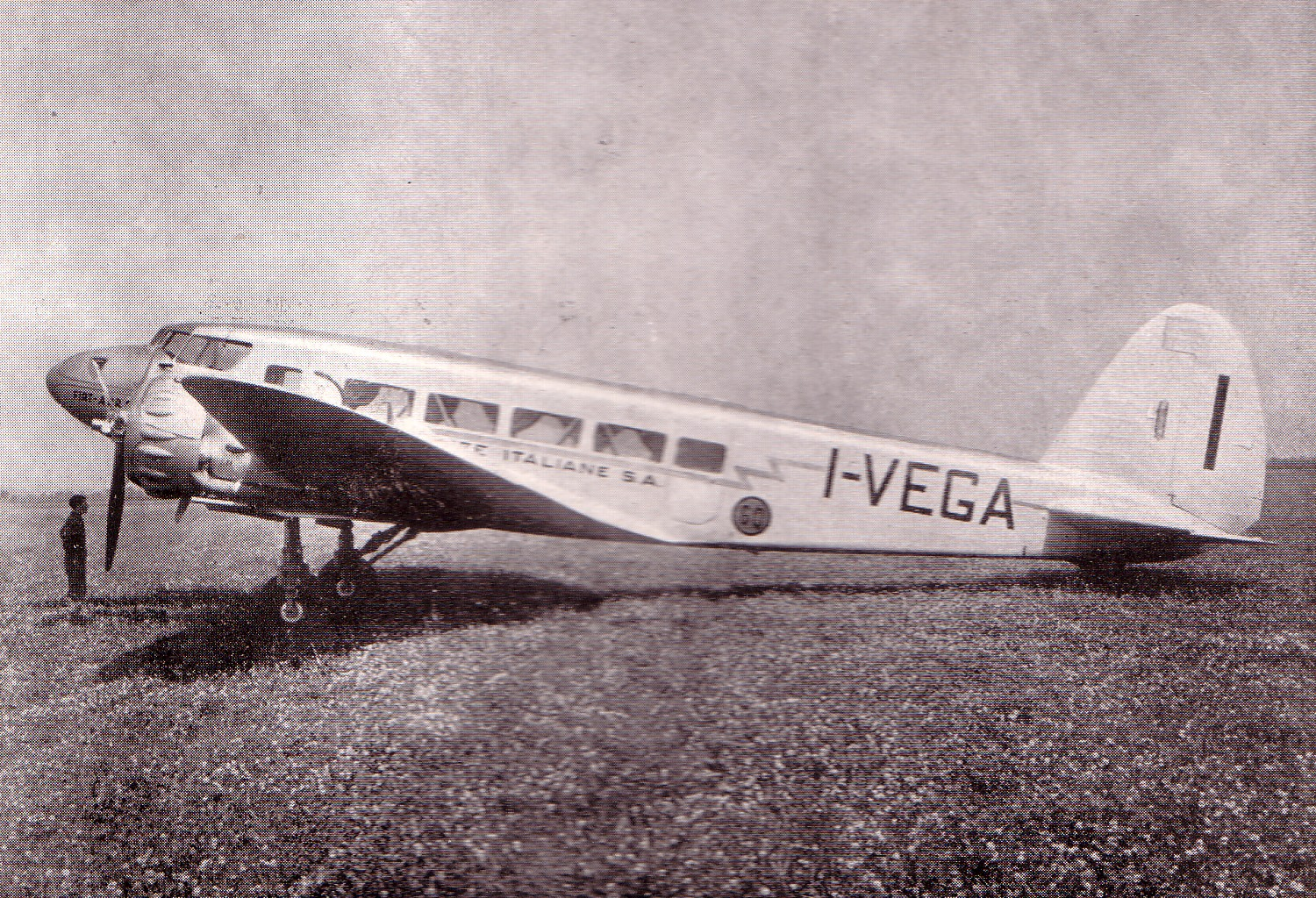

General information
- Type: Airliner
- Manufacturer: Fiat Aviazione
- Number built: 1

History
- First flight: 1935

The FIAT APR.2 was a prototype airliner built in Italy in 1935. It was a sleek, low-wing cantilever monoplane of conventional configuration with tailwheel undercarriage, the main units of which retracted into the engine nacelles, one on each wing. The cabin could carry 12 passengers, and at the time of its introduction on Ala Littoria's Milan-Turin-Paris route, it was believed to be the fastest airliner in regular service in the world. Despite this, only one example was built, although the design served as a starting point for the Fiat BR.20 bomber.

== Specifications ==
General characteristics

- Crew: 2 pilots
- Capacity: 12 passengers
- Length: 14.32 m (47 ft 0 in)
- Wingspan: 19.50 m (64 ft 0 in)
- Height: 3.55 m (11 ft 8 in)
- Gross weight: 6,700 kg (14,770 lb)
- Powerplant: 2 × Fiat A.59 , 522 kW (700 hp) each

Performance

- Maximum speed: 390 km/h (240 mph, 210 kn)
- Range: 1,800 km (1,100 mi, 960 nmi)
- Service ceiling: 7,750 m (25,400 ft)
