= FÉLIN =

French military equipment

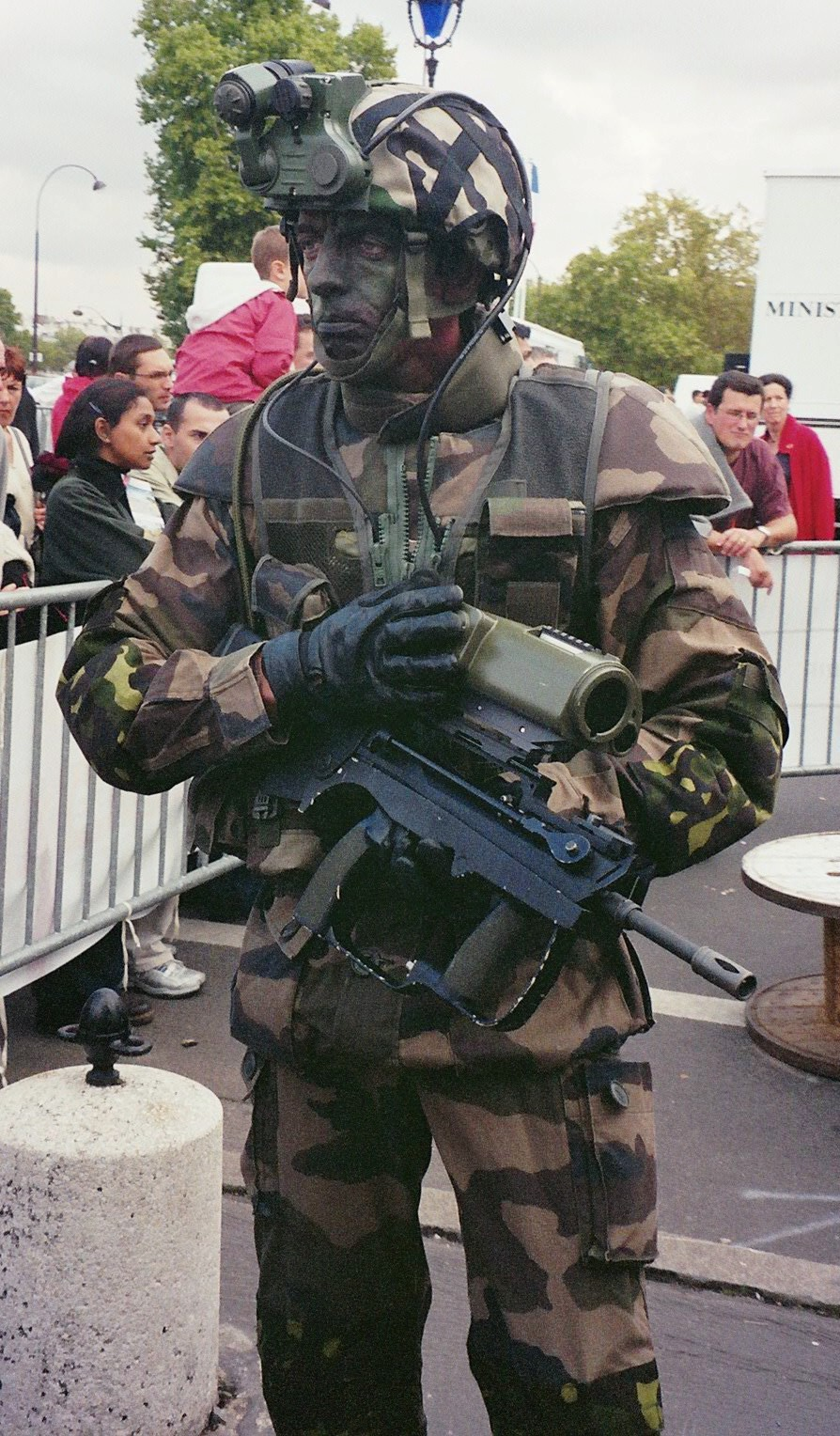
A FÉLIN suit linked to a modified FAMAS

FÉLIN (Fantassin à Équipement et Liaisons Intégrés, Integrated Infantryman Equipment and Communications) is the name for the French infantry combat system developed by Safran Electronics & Defense.

It combines a modified FAMAS rifle with a host of other electronics, clothing, pouches, and body armour. The helmet is an integral SPECTRA helmet fitted with real-time positioning and information system, and with light amplifiers for night vision. Power sources will be made of two rechargeable Li-ion batteries.

The €1.1bn (FY2012) project was to see 22,588 units delivered between 2010 and 2015, at a unit cost of €38,000 (€49,000 including development costs). The system entered service in late 2011, when 300 were deployed to Afghanistan.

== History ==
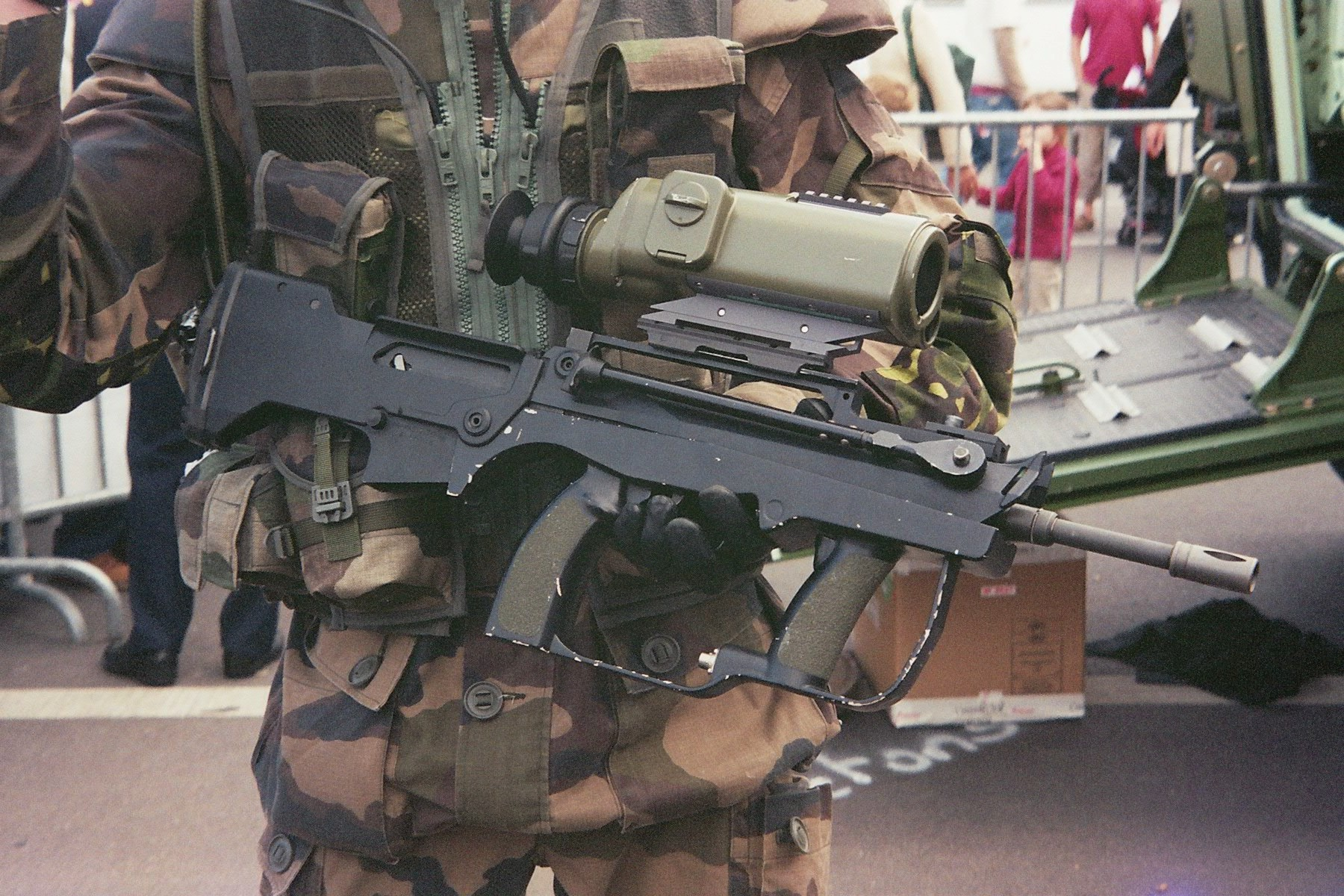
Improved FAMAS F1 Félin system

Between 1997 and 2000, the Félin programme was in its demonstration phase, focusing primarily on: communications, observation (day and night, by trying to increase range), protection (detectability: visual, acoustic and electromagnetic, protection against attack), power/energy and mobility (system weight, ergonomics, location and navigation aid).

During the first half of 2000, several operational trials were conducted, notably engagements between groups (one equipped with some of the Félin features, one without). The trials were successful, as the group equipped with the new features was significantly more efficient, even though it was carrying earlier versions of the system which had not been optimised in weight.

In 2001, the definition phase of the programme started. Engineering teams re-thought every step and system, putting aside all the previously tested demonstrators and updating the systems to the state of the art of their respective technologies.

Meanwhile, a bidding started for French and European industrial producers.

After several years of development and trials, the programme is now reaching completion. The first orders have been signed and the first deliveries should have happened in 2007.

In November 2009, 22,588 Félin systems had been ordered. The system was first deployed on the front-line on 7 September 2010 with the 1st Line Infantry Regiment in the Surobi District, which was occupied by the French forces in Afghanistan.

== Description ==
Three major systems can be distinguished:

=== Individual system ===
The individual system is made up of six sub-systems:

==== Clothing and armour ====
Basic combat clothing has a full cut allowing free movement. Bellows pockets provide ample carrying capacity. The material (fabric) offers good mechanical properties but still allows good air permeability.

The fibres (aramid/viscose FR) are flame- and wash-resistant.

The ballistic jacket accommodates:

- Flexible ballistic protection
- Hard ballistic protection
- Electronic jacket
- Load-bearing structure.

The electronic jacket integrates the electronics (computer unit, manager unit, radio, man-machine interface, GPS, cables and connector), flexible water bottle, FAMAS magazines and grenades, and optimises weight distribution on the soldier.

The equipment is autonomous and can be used alone. The NRBC combat clothing is similar to permanent combat clothing. It is designed to allow combat phases to be carried out with the same efficiency as that achieved with conventional combat clothing.

==== Camouflage ====
There have been many rumours about introduction of a new camouflage pattern. Demonstrators model have been disclosed sporting DPM, flecktarn and an original spot camouflage pattern showing similarities to German Flecktarn and Australian Auscam (see picture below), however latest demonstrators suggest that early Félin systems should use French standard CCE camouflage pattern. The French Army have selected the Kermel V50 and VMC40 fabrics to equip its troops within the context of the Félin Project.

==== Portable electronic platform (PEP) ====
The PEP lies at the heart of the Félin system. Designed to use all the electronic resources found on the electronic jacket (computer, energy manager, peripheral equipment interfaces, user interfaces), The system is built around a USB 2.0 digital data bus. This choice of open broadband digital data bus and extensive connectivity gives the portable electronic platform, and hence the system, strong interoperability.

==== Individual energy sources ====
Peripheral equipment can be connected to the physical connection ports situated at the front of the battery units. Power sources will be made of two rechargeable Li-ion batteries, provided partially by the Swiss Leclanché group

==== Weapons ====
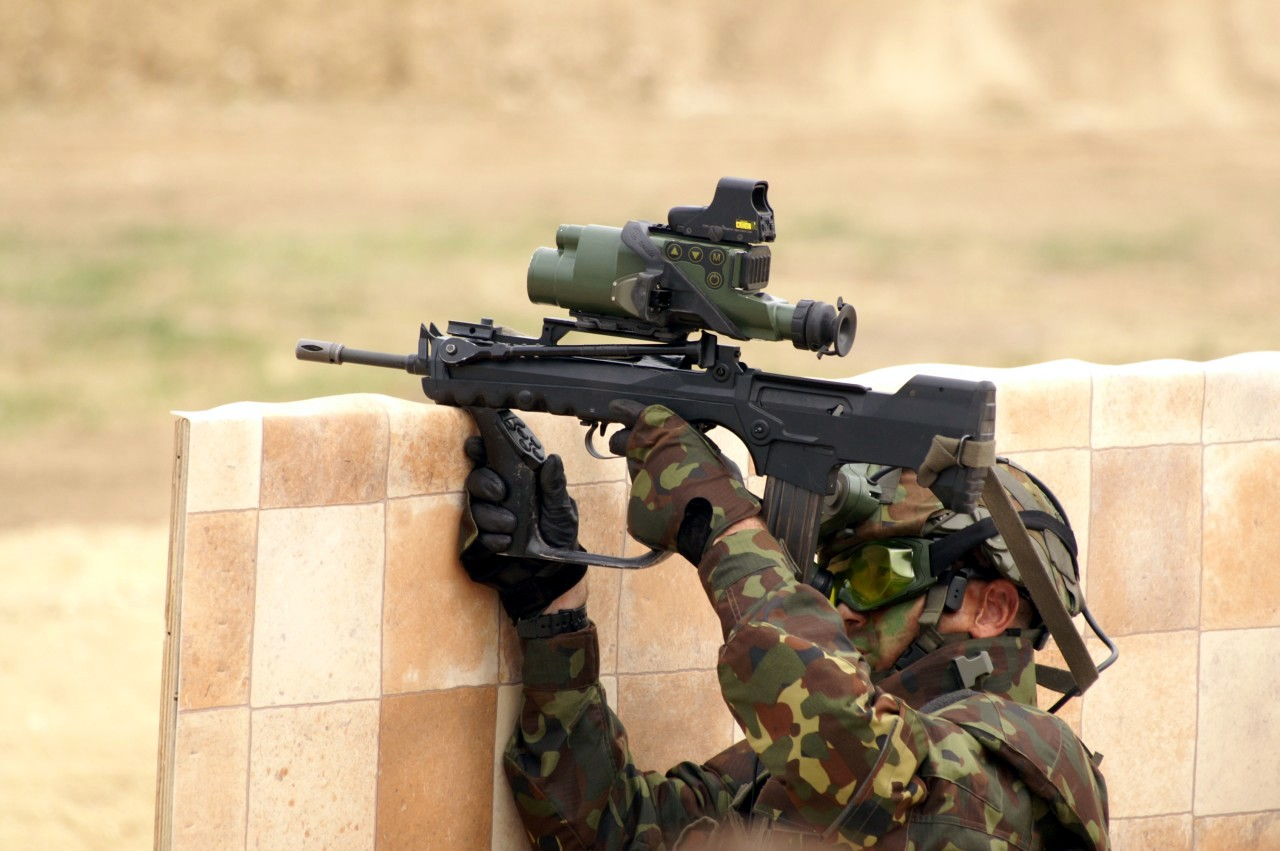
Electronic systems allow firing while maintaining cover

FAMAS will remain the infantryman’s basic weapon, updated into Félin FAMAS. The FN Minimi (5.56 mm calibre light machine gun) and the FRF2 (7.62 calibre sniper rifle) can accommodate a telescopic night sight with no need for changes.

FAMAS accommodates a man-machine interface, a second grip and a telescopic sight. The sight is equipped with a day imager and a night imager (the infantryman’s sight will be light intensifying, and one soldier per squad will have a thermal sight: uncooled IR), a restitution eyepiece, a clear sight for instinctive shooting. The sight has an integrated video camera that transmits received images to the system. A wire connection links the weapon to the system.

The Minimi sight uses similar technology to the FAMAS IR sight. The sight supports man-machine interfaces and integrates resources for radio communication with the rest of the Félin system.

The FRF2 precision rifle sight is based on the use of uncooled infrared sensors, combined with adapted magnifying optics. It also includes radio communication resources.

==== Helmet ====
The helmet is composed of three components: head protection, communication headset, and optronic equipment. The ballistic shell optimises protection and load-bearing ergonomics (weight distribution). It can accommodate various items required for the mission (facial protection screens) and its shape is compatible with all firing positions of the weapons used.

A lightweight, integrated protective shield protects the infantryman from various threats (wind, rain, dust, UV). Non-linear earplugs afford auditory protection. The NBC mask can be equipped with a filter cartridge or linked to the ventilation powerpack. A tube built into the NBC mask can be used to take in liquids (water, food).

The communication headset is linked to the radio. It holds the microphone and earpiece and works by bone vibrations (bone conduction transducer). It works independently from the helmet and can therefore remain in operation when the helmet is removed.

The optronic equipment is composed of mission interface overshell integrating the optronics, head camera (EBCMOS light intensification technology), image display units (OLED technology) allowing data and icons transmitted on the bus system to be displayed, images and video coming from the weapon or the head camera. The image display unit is fixed to the helmet: its screen can be brought into line with infantryman's eye. When not in use, it can be folded away so as not to hinder the soldier.

==== Félin information network ====
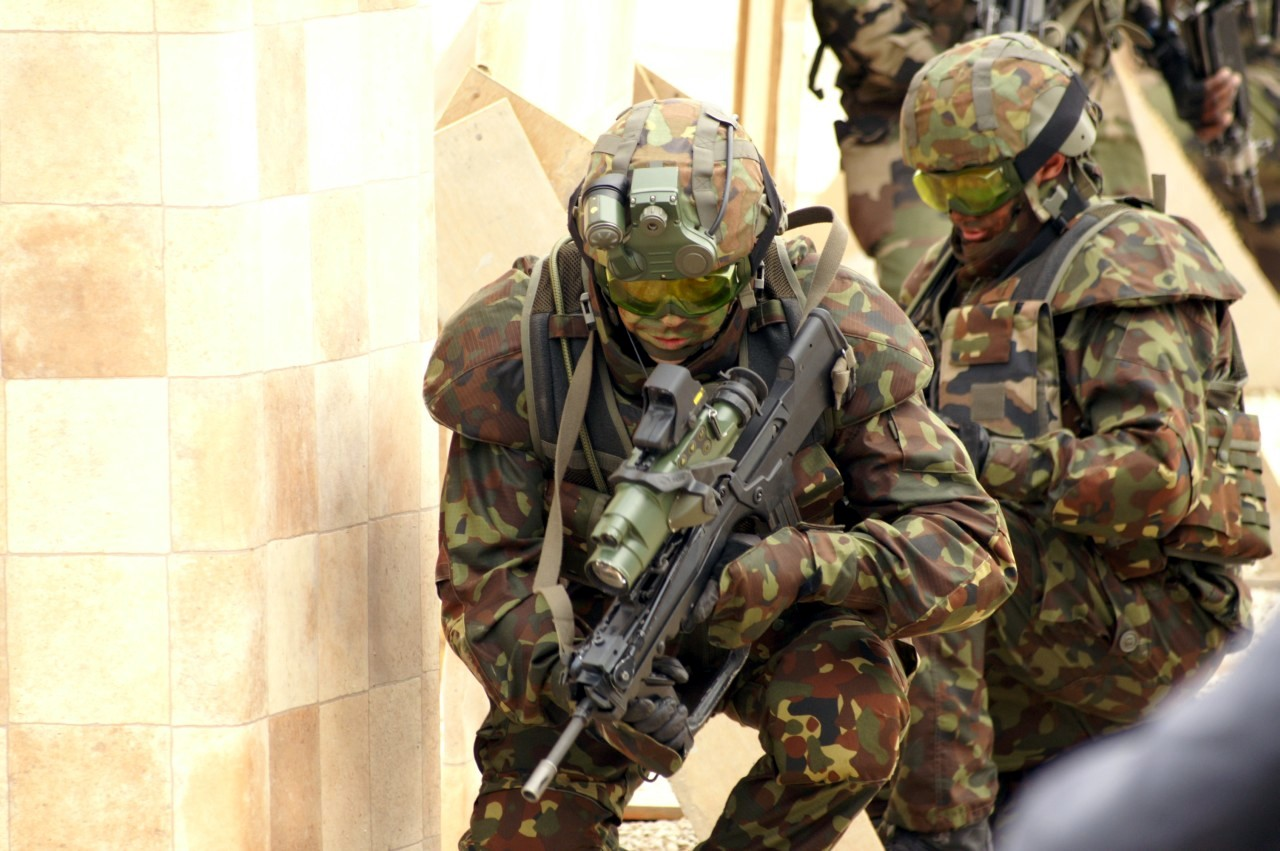
Personal armour and communications have been improved

The Félin information network (RIF) allows information to be shared throughout the infantry section. Each radio can subscribe to two networks simultaneously. This offers the squad leader some flexibility in organising communication networks in his section. Each network has an audio conference channel, with priority given to the squad leader, an alert channel from the infantryman to his leader, and a data transmission channel. Voice and data transmission is based on tried and tested DECT civilian technology (domestic cordless telephone technology). Each sub-network works from a base carried by the squad leader. As RIF sets are all identical, a soldier can replace his commander if necessary by configuring his set as base. The radio is configured by the Félin computer, thereby limiting the number of control buttons needed on the set.

=== Specific systems ===
==== Dismounted soldier’s Terminal Information System (TIS) ====
The TIS is made up of software supported by the computer, a man-machine interface and a communication interface box connected to a PR4G VS4 portable radio set.

==== Multipurpose infrared binoculars ====
for the squad leader are based on uncooled IR technology.

==== Transport/carrying case ====
The Félin weapon and subsidiary systems are transported and stored in a Storm iM3220 plastic moulded carry case with foam cut-outs designed for each part. The case is manufactured by Pelican Products.

=== Collective systems ===
==== Collective recharging unit (MRC) ====
Used to recharge the soldiers’ individual batteries. It uses aluminum–air metal–air fuel cells.

==== Vehicle kits ====
(AMX-10P, VBCI, VAB) all have a common structure and are designed for easy integration into vehicles, where they provide the power supply for the mounted soldiers’ systems.

== Deliveries/programme ==
31,455 individual Félin systems have been delivered to France, as follows:

- Infantry: 22,588 systems
- Armoured cavalry: 2,801 systems
- Engineers: 3,576 systems
- Artillery: 2,480 systems

== See also ==
- Future Soldier
- Ratnik (program)
