= Swinger =

Swinger or swingers may refer to:

== Music ==
- Performers associated with swing music, a jazz style developed in the 1930s and 1940s
- The Swinger (album), a 1958 album by trumpeter Harry Edison
- The Swingers, a New Zealand rock band active 1979–1982

== Film and television ==
- The Swinger, a 1966 film directed by George Sidney
- Swingers (1996 film), a 1996 comedy-drama film
- Swingers (2002 film), a Dutch feature film
- Swingers (2016 film), a Latvian comedy
- Swingers (2018 film), a Finnish comedy
- "Swingers" (Wonder Years episode)

== People ==
- Johnny Swinger, ring name of American professional wrestler Joseph Dorgan (born 1975)
- Rashod Swinger (born 1974), American National Football League player

== Other uses ==
- Partners engaged in swinging (sexual practice), a form of non-monogamy
- HMS Swinger, six ships of the Royal Navy
- Swinger Bay, a bay on the north west shore of Milne Bay, Papua New Guinea
- Fender Swinger, a rare vintage Fender guitar
- Polaroid Swinger, a model of Polaroid camera
- Swing ride, a carousel variation with seats suspended from a rotating top
- A two-door submodel of the Dodge Dart, often a high-performance variation equipped with a 340ci V8 engine
- AT-12 Swinger, NATO reporting name of Soviet ATGM

== See also ==
- Home Swinger, a musical instrument created by Yuri Landman
- Swing (disambiguation)
- Swingin' (disambiguation)
- Schwinger (disambiguation)
