= Microtecnica =

Italian aircraft supplier

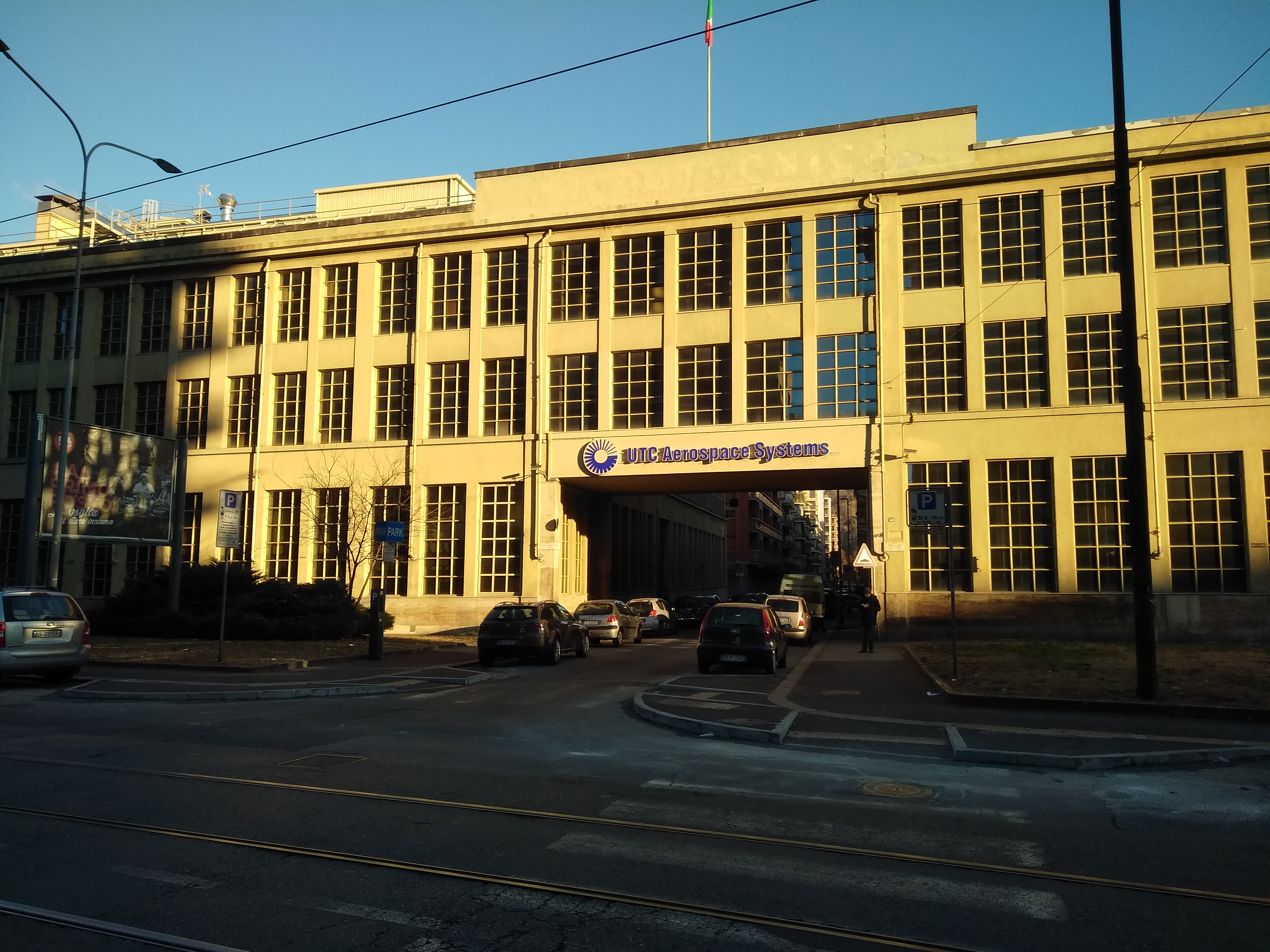
Microtecnica - Turin

Microtecnica S.r.l. is a main Italian aircraft component company (hydraulics), now owned by Safran Electronics & Defense.

== History ==
The company was founded in 1929. It supplies equipment for helicopters and regional jet aircraft, such as the AgustaWestland AW101, the NHIndustries NH90 and Agusta A129 Mangusta. It supplied hydraulic actuation systems for the Panavia Tornado, such as the air intake control system, which it designed with Hawker Siddeley Dynamics, and the auxiliary power unit.

=== Ownership ===
In April 2011 the company was bought by United Technologies for 330 million euros.

== Products ==
- Flight control actuation hydraulic systems
- Aircraft environmental control systems
