= Pendulum Instruments =

Brand of scientific instruments

Pendulum Instruments is a line of scientific instruments for high-resolution time and frequency measurements.

Pendulum was originally created in the 1960s as the Philips time and frequency competence center. After 30 years of existence within Philips, it was spun off from 1998 but continued to sell Philips-branded instruments for another two years before starting to sell instruments under its own brand name.

A Russian subsidiary was established in 2004, and in 2005, XL Microwave (an Oakland, CA-based manufacturer of microwave frequency counters and similar equipment) was acquired and transformed into the US branch Pendulum Instruments, Inc.

In 2008, Pendulum became part of the Orolia Group, and in 2009 its operations were combined with another Orolia company, Spectracom to form one global time & frequency systems & services organization operating under the Spectracom umbrella. Pendulum Instruments continues to be a leading brand of test & measurement instruments and are also sold under the Fluke brand name in most parts of the world, and total sales in the specific field are second only to Agilent Technologies.

Pendulum's range of products:

- Crystal, OCXO and rubidium-based frequency counters and timers
- Frequency references (OCXO and rubidium based, stand-alone as well as GPS disciplined)
- Reference frequency distribution systems (coaxial and optical)
- Instruments for measuring the stability of synchronization clocks
