= FAMAS =

French bullpup assault rifle

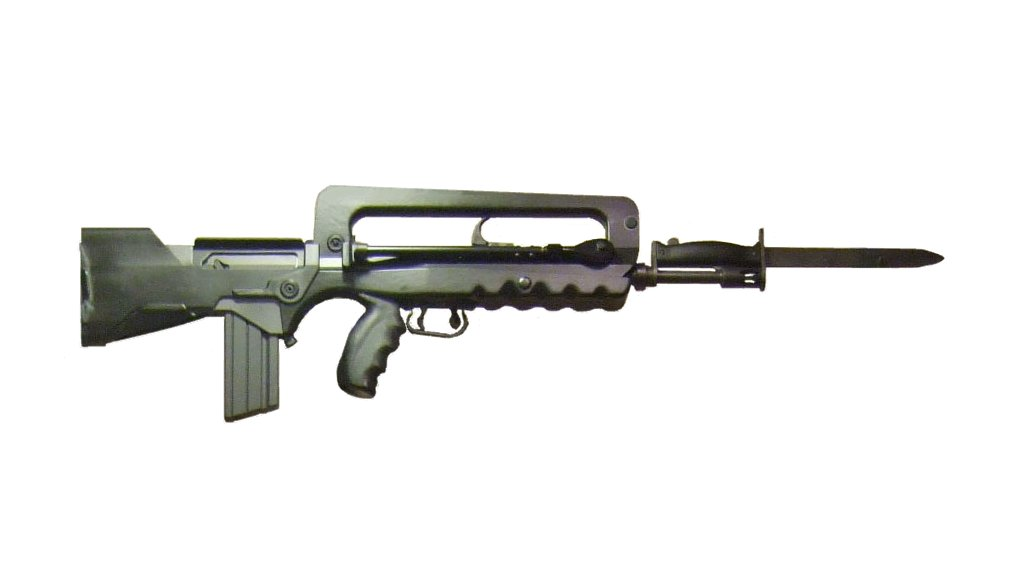
- FAMAS F1 with a bayonet
- Type: Bullpup assault rifle
- Place of origin: France

Service history
- In service: 1978–present
- Used by: See Users
- Wars: See Conflicts

Production history
- Designer: Paul Tellie
- Designed: 1967–1971
- Manufacturer: GIAT Industries
- Unit cost: F1: 1,500 €. G2: 3,000 €
- Produced: F1: 1975–2000; G2: 1994–2000
- No. built: F1: 400,000; G2: 10,000-15,000
- Variants: See Variants

Specifications
- Mass: 3.61 kg (7.96 lb) (F1); 3.8 kg (8.4 lb) (G2)
- Length: 757 mm (29.8 in); FAMAS Commando: 555 mm (21.9 in)
- Barrel length: 488 mm (19.2 in); FAMAS Commando: 285 mm (11.2 in)
- Cartridge: 5.56×45mm NATO
- Action: Lever-delayed blowback
- Rate of fire: 900–1,100 rounds/min
- Muzzle velocity: 930 m/s (3,100 ft/s) (F1); 925 m/s (3,030 ft/s) (G2)
- Effective firing range: 300 m (330 yd) ("F1"); 450 m (490 yd) ("G2")
- Maximum firing range: 3,200 m (3,500 yd)
- Feed system: 25-round detachable box magazine (F1); 30-round detachable box magazine (STANAG) (G2)
- Sights: Rear aperture fitted with tritium night inserts, front post

The FAMAS (French: Fusil d'Assaut de la Manufacture d'Armes de Saint-Étienne, lit. 'Assault rifle from the Saint-Étienne Weapon Factory') is a bullpup assault rifle designed and manufactured in France by MAS in 1978.

Beginning in 2017, the FAMAS was replaced in most frontline units in the French Army by the HK416F, and the FAMAS is expected to remain in limited service until 2028.

== History ==
The first French bullpup rifles were developed between 1946 and 1950 at the AME (French: Atelier Mécanique de Mulhouse) and MAS, testing rounds such as .30 US Carbine, 7.92×33mm Kurz, 7.65×38mm (Made by Cartoucherie de Valence) and some other intermediate calibres.

Since France was engaged in the First Indochina War at the time and was also the second-largest contributor to NATO, research budgets for new weapons were limited, and priority was given to the modernisation and production of existing service weapons.

Nevertheless, approximately forty different 7.62×51mm NATO calibre prototype rifles were developed between 1952 and 1962, most notably the FA-MAS Type 62. However, the United States' adoption of the M16 rifle and 5.56×45mm cartridge caused the French to rethink their approach, and consequently, the Type 62 was not adopted.

In the 1960s, MAS began to manufacture under licence the Heckler & Koch G3 battle rifle and later on the Heckler & Koch HK33 assault rifle as temporary substitutes.

At the same time, the French embraced the idea of developing a new 5.56 mm automatic rifle. However, adopting the German-designed HK33 was considered unsatisfactory for many members of the French high command.

General Marcel Bigeard was also against the idea of relying on foreign weapons. While visiting the Manufacture d'Armes de Saint-Étienne, he asked the engineers to develop a homemade French 5.56 mm automatic rifle, which subsequently led to the creation and adoption of the FAMAS.

The FAMAS project began in 1967 under the direction of General Paul Tellié (1919-2014) and the first prototype was completed in 1971, with French military evaluation of the rifle beginning in 1972.

When production problems delayed the general issue of the new rifles, and with the 1978 Battle of Kolwezi showing an immediate need for a more modern weapon to be comparable with the assault rifles of enemy forces, the French Army began searching for an emergency temporary rifle until the FAMAS came into full production.

While the Heckler & Koch HK33 was considered, with a batch of 1,200 examples tested, it was ultimately turned down in favour of the SIG SG 540, made under licence by Manurhin as a temporary resort until enough domestically built FAMAS were produced to issue to French forces.

In late 1978, the French military accepted the FAMAS as their standard-issue rifle, the FAMAS F1.

=== Service ===
The FAMAS first saw service in Chad during Operation Manta and again in desert operations during Operation Desert Storm and in other various missions.

Officially, operational conditions proved the weapon to be reliable and trustworthy under combat conditions. It is known affectionally by French troops as "The Bugle" (French: Le Clairon) due to its distinctive shape.

=== Replacement ===
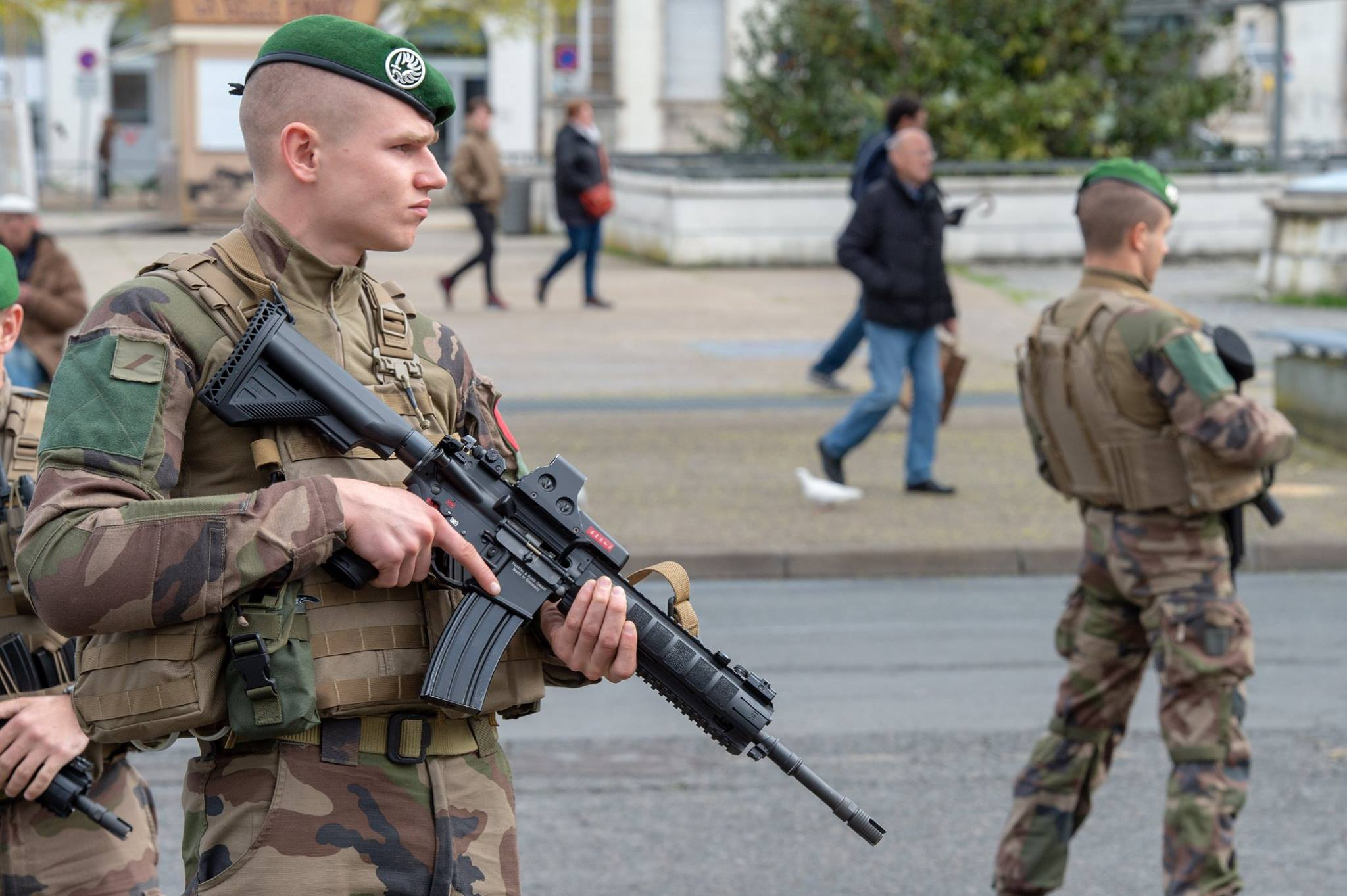
Legionnaires from the 2nd Foreign Parachute Regiment during a patrol with the new standard-issue assault rifle of the French Armed Forces, the HK416F

In 2017, the French armed forces began retiring the FAMAS in favour of the German-made HK-416.

When the Manufacture d'Armes de Saint-Etienne (MAS) factory closed in 2002, no more domestic rifles could be made. The last batch of newly produced FAMAS, built in 2002, saw more than a decade of heavy service by 2016. As of 2014, the French armed forces currently use an estimated 400,000 FAMAS F1 and G2 rifles still stored in their arsenal. The military also ceased manufacture of special steel-case ammunition for the FAMAS. Because the FAMAS did not function properly with NATO standard brass-cased ammunition (chamber fluting can allow the F1 to use brass cases but only G2 rifles can use common STANAG magazines), and coupled with concern over the age of existing weapons, the French military sought a replacement for the FAMAS.

In May 2014, the French Ministry of Armed Forces announced a European Union-wide tender for a minimum of 90,000 rifles and carbines to be issued across the entire French armed forces. In August 2016, the Ministry selected Heckler and Koch's HK416 to replace the FAMAS as the new general-issue service rifle. Under the contract, the new rifle was designated as the HK416F, with 'F' standing for French version. 16,000 rifles will be annually purchased until a final total of 90,000 to 102,000 rifles are delivered. The new rifles are expected to remain in active French service for at least 30 years.

The FAMAS will be issued to the French National Guard and domestic police units, and will continue to serve in reserve and non-combat units until 2028, when a phaseout of the FAMAS with the HK416 can occur.

== Design details ==
=== Action ===
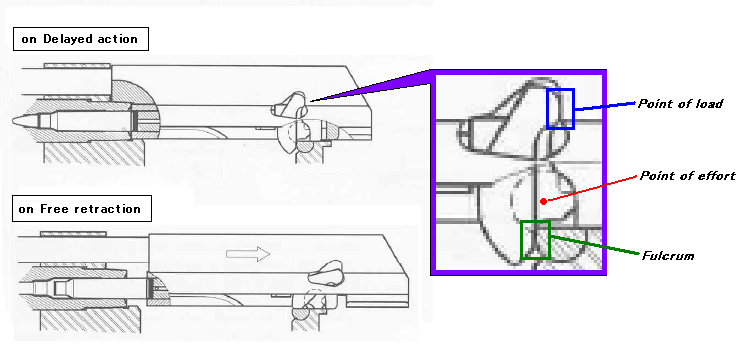
A schematic of the lever-delayed blowback mechanism used in the FAMAS

The FAMAS is a bullpup assault rifle, where the ammunition feed is behind the trigger. The receiver housing is made of a special steel alloy, and the rifle furniture is made of fibreglass.

The FAMAS uses a lever-delayed blowback action, an action type also used in the French AA-52 machine gun derived from the prototypes built during Army Technical Department tests having taken place between the First and Second World Wars.

The FAMAS is known for its high rate of fire of around 900–1,100 rounds per minute.

=== Ergonomics ===
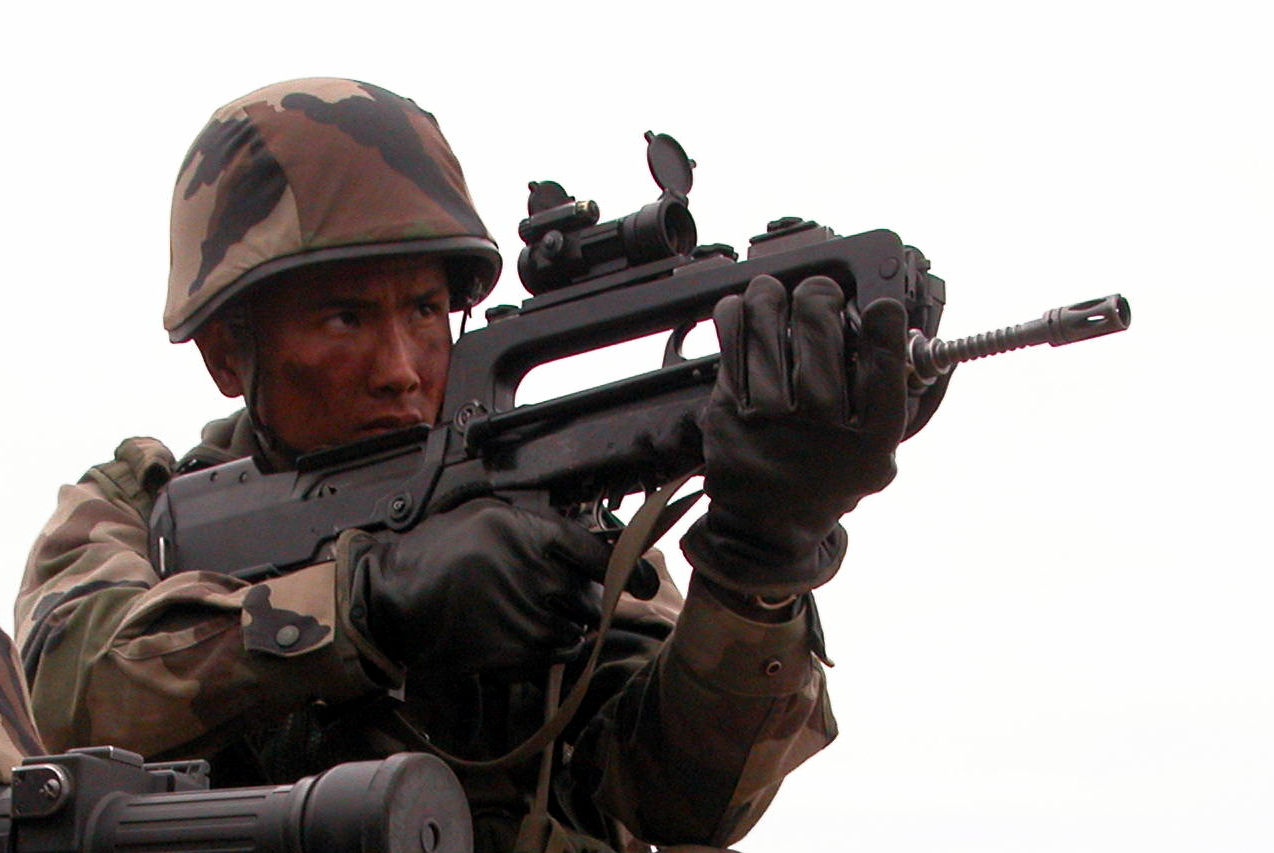
Soldier of the 2nd Foreign Infantry Regiment using FAMAS Infanterie upgraded with an Aimpoint red dot sight

Fire mode is controlled by a selector within the trigger guard, with three settings: safe (central position), single shot (to the right), and automatic fire (to the left). Automatic fire can be in three-shot bursts (French: rafale) or fully automatic; this is determined by another selector, located under the housing and behind the magazine.

The FAMAS G2 weighs 3.8 kg (8.38 lb). The G1 and G2 have a large, grip-length trigger guard like that of the Steyr AUG to allow easy access to the trigger when wearing gloves.

Both F1 and G2 models of the FAMAS feature a bipod attached to the upper hand-guard.

The FAMAS-G2 and some F1 sport a "polyvalent hand-guard" which features a standard NATO Accessory Rail, allowing a variety of sights to be mounted, notably red dot sights and night vision units.

=== Ammunition ===
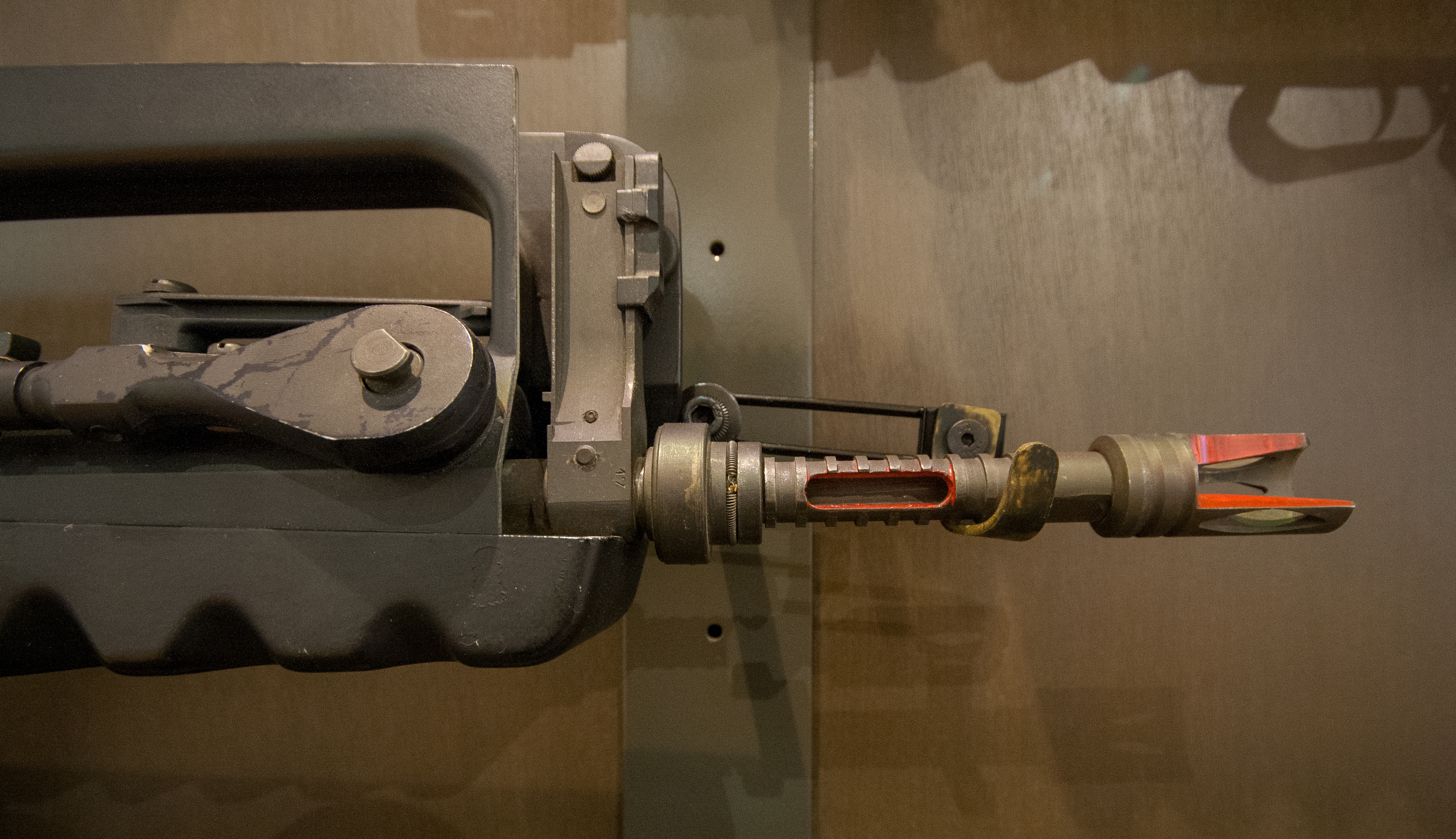
Cutaway of the muzzle of a FAMAS F1 on display at the Weapons Department in the Museum of Art and Industry in Saint-Étienne, France

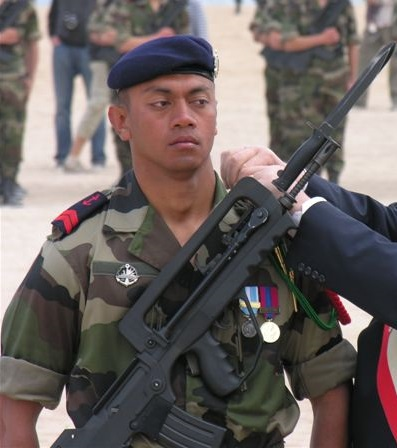
A fusilier marin with his FAMAS G2

The FAMAS uses a delayed blowback operating system that functions best with French-specified steel-casing 5.56×45mm ammunition. Using standard brass-casing 5.56×45mm NATO ammunition employed by other armies can create over-pressure and case ruptures in the FAMAS during extraction, which can lead to severe malfunctions.

Using incorrectly built ammunition also results in approximately two minor injuries for every million rounds fired from a FAMAS. As a result, the French military has discreetly banned the use of foreign-produced ammunition in all French-issued FAMAS.

However, fluting the chamber will completely remove these malfunctions, although the brass casings will still be deformed and will not be able to be reloaded without reshaping.

The FAMAS F1 uses a proprietary 25-round magazine. It has a chrome-lined barrel with 1 turn in 12 inch (1:12 inch) rifling and functions best with the 55 gr (3.6 g) (M193 type) ammunition. When using the French made 5.56 mm 55 gr (3.6 g) ammo it has a muzzle velocity of 3,150 ft/s (960 m/s).

The FAMAS G2 uses M16-type, NATO-compatible 30-round STANAG magazines. It has a chrome-lined barrel with 1 turn in 9 inch (1:9 inch) rifling and functions equally well with both the older 55 gr (3.6 g) (M193 type) ammo and the newer 62 gr (4.0 g) (SS109 type) ammo. When using the French made 5.56 mm 62 gr (4.0 g) ammo it has a muzzle velocity of 3,035 ft/s (925 m/s).

During training with blank ammunition, a special plug is added to the muzzle of the FAMAS. This plug is necessary for automatic or semi-automatic blank fire operation, and functions by blocking part of the gas used in a blank cartridge.

=== Rifle grenades ===
Alidade for direct fire of the APAV 40 grenade

The FAMAS can use a variety of rifle grenades up to 500 g (18 oz). Notable examples include the antipersonnel APAV40 and the anti-tank AC58.

The FAMAS features two alidades for aiming rifle grenades with several modes:

- direct fire at 75 to 100 m (246 to 328 ft), in anti-vehicle role
- indirect fire, in anti-personnel role:
  - with the FAMAS inclined by 45°, allowing fire from 120 to 340 m (390 to 1,120 ft)
  - with the FAMAS inclined by 75°, allowing fire from 60 to 170 m (200 to 560 ft)

In indirect fire mode, the grenade support (more exactly named "grenade enforcement ring" in French) is moved forward or backwards on the barrel which has markings (12/13?). This changes the position of the grenade on the barrel and automatically the volume of the chamber in which the gas expands to push the grenade forward.

Each position of the grenade support has a number which is multiplied by a certain fixed number depending on the alidade position, 45° or 75°; this will accurately indicate the firing distance of the grenade.

The FAMAS can also accommodate an external grenade launcher as an add-on module under the hand guard; the US M203 grenade launcher is sometimes used.

== Variants ==
=== FAMAS F1 ===
1. Rubber buttpad; 2. Removable stock; 3. Cheek rest. Can be reversed for right or left-handed shooter.; 4. Mobile assembly and ejection port; 5. Pins; 6. Bipod; 7. Handguard; 8. Charging Handle; 9. Grenade launcher sight; 10. Grenade support; 11. Flash hider/22 mm rifle grenade launcher; 12. Barrel; 13. Fire control selector: Safety, semi-automatic, automatic; 14. Trigger; 15. Magazine release; 16. Magazine block (safety device); 17. Serial number; 18. (right): 3-round burst or full automatic selector (left): Sling ring

After adoption by the French military, the FAMAS F1 replaced both the aging MAS 49/56 rifle and MAT-49 submachine gun. Approximately 400,000 FAMAS F1 assault rifles were produced by MAS.

While a capable rifle, the F1 had numerous problems to overcome. For instance, many plastic pieces on the rifle easily broke, including critical parts like the cheek riser. The FAMAS was also susceptible to malfunction on occasion due to poorly built, or rather improperly used, magazines.

The FAMAS was designed around the concept of single-use, disposable magazines; when the limited budget of the French military forced soldiers to repeatedly reuse the disposable magazines, the FAMAS would experience malfunctions.

MAS would eventually manufacture more durable magazines for the FAMAS that improved reliability.

=== FAMAS G1 ===
The F1 was followed by the G1 version that included several minor improvements, such as redesigned grips and an enlarged trigger guard for operation with gloves.

=== FAMAS G2 ===
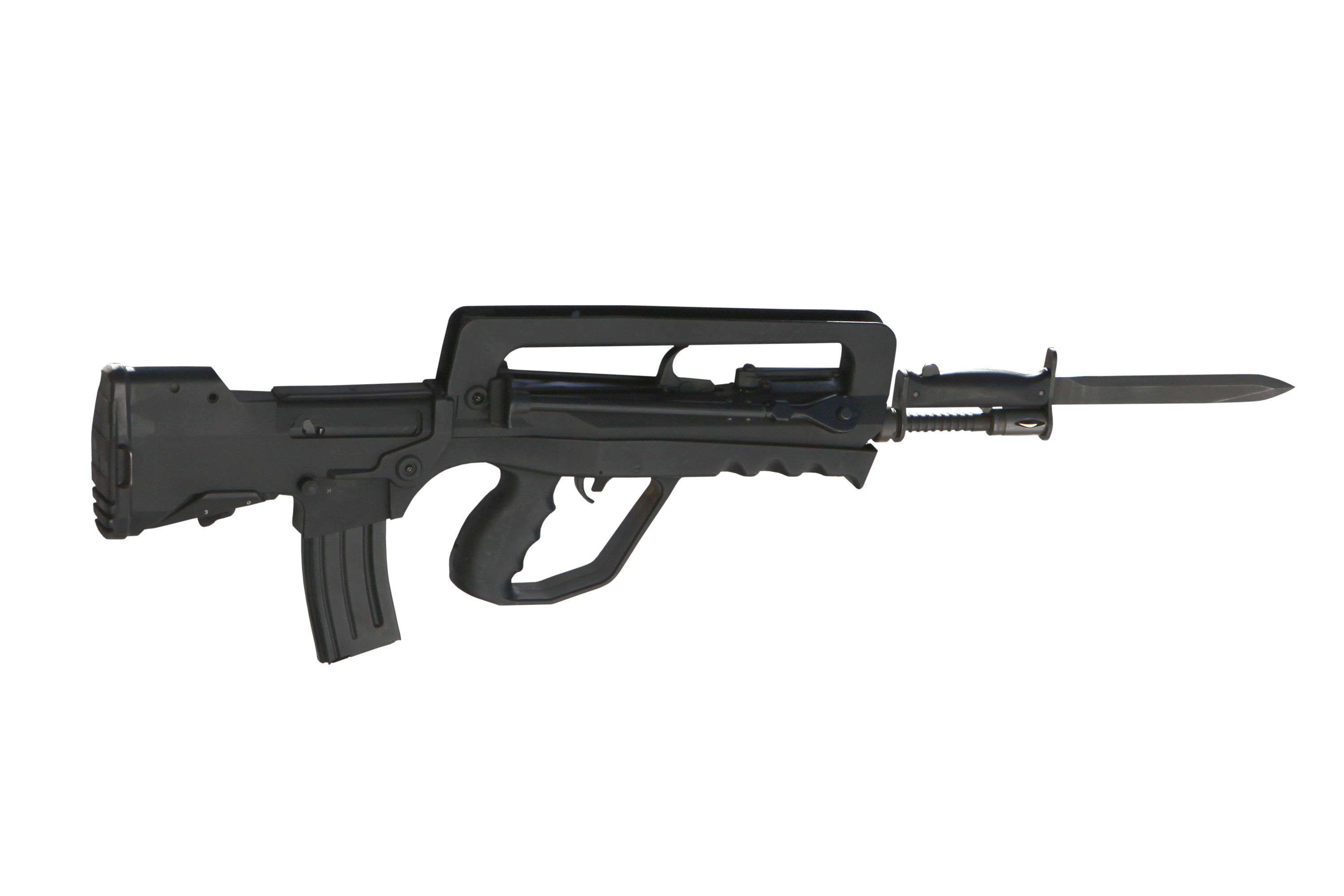
FAMAS G2 with bayonet

The FAMAS G2 was developed in 1994 to comply with NATO standards by accepting standard NATO magazines and by employing tighter barrel rifling to accurately fire both older 5.56 mm 55 gr (3.6 g) ammunition and new standard 5.56×45mm NATO 62 gr (4.0 g) ammunition.

The ammunition specific lever-delayed blowback mechanism of the FAMAS F1 designed around French 55 gr (3.6 g) steel cased ammunition was slightly revised for reliably using 5.56×45mm NATO ammunition.

The FAMAS G2 features a larger trigger guard compared to the F1, a redesigned magwell and magazine catch accepting STANAG magazines, a small hand-guard protrusion (bump) on the front of fore-stock under the muzzle, a 1/9 inch rifling twist, instead of the 1/12 inch rifling twist of the F1.

The FAMAS G2 also included several other upgrades taken from the G1 model, such as an enlarged trigger guard and improved hand guards made from reinforced fiberglass instead of plastic, and also the ability to take standard brass cased ammunition as well as French made steel ammunition.

The French Navy purchased the FAMAS G2 in 1995 and issued it to their Fusiliers Marins and Commandos Marine. However, the French army refused to purchase the G2, preferring to rely on the FAMAS F1 as their primary rifle.

=== FAMAS Infantry ===
The FAMAS Infantry is an improvement of the FAMAS F1, obtained by retrofitting an accessory rail onto the top of the handguard. This allows mounting combat optics, most notably reflex sights or the 4×26.4 SCROME J4 telescopic sight.

=== FAMAS FÉLIN ===
The FAMAS FÉLIN was developed from the G2 as part of the Infantryman programme with integrated equipment and links (Félin). An improved version of the FAMAS F1 is integrated in the Félin system.

=== FAMAS Valorisé ===
A FAMAS F1 whose carry handle has been replaced by the new version intended for the FAMAS Félin, lowered and originally equipped with 2 Picatinny rails.

In addition, the bipod joint has been moved back about ten centimetres and each foot is now bent in 2 points forward, so that in the folded position they do not interfere with the ejection of empty cases.

=== FAMAS Commando ===
The FAMAS Commando was a short-barrelled version of the FAMAS G2 for international exports, with a barrel length of 285mm (11.2 in) without the integrated bipod. Prototypes of the weapon differ, with different iron sights and ergonomics.

The FAMAS Commando saw no international interest and only initial prototypes exist and solely kept by the French Ministry of the Interior.

== Conflicts ==
The FAMAS has been used in the following conflicts:

- 1982 Lebanon War
- Chadian–Libyan conflict
- Ouvéa cave hostage taking
- Gulf War
- Rwandan Civil War
- Bosnian War
- War in Afghanistan (2001–2021)
- Opération Licorne
- Iraq War
- Operation Serval
- Operation Barkhane
- Syrian Civil War
- War in Iraq (2013–2017)
- Russian invasion of Ukraine

== Users ==
A Cameroonian soldier patrols with his FAMAS F1

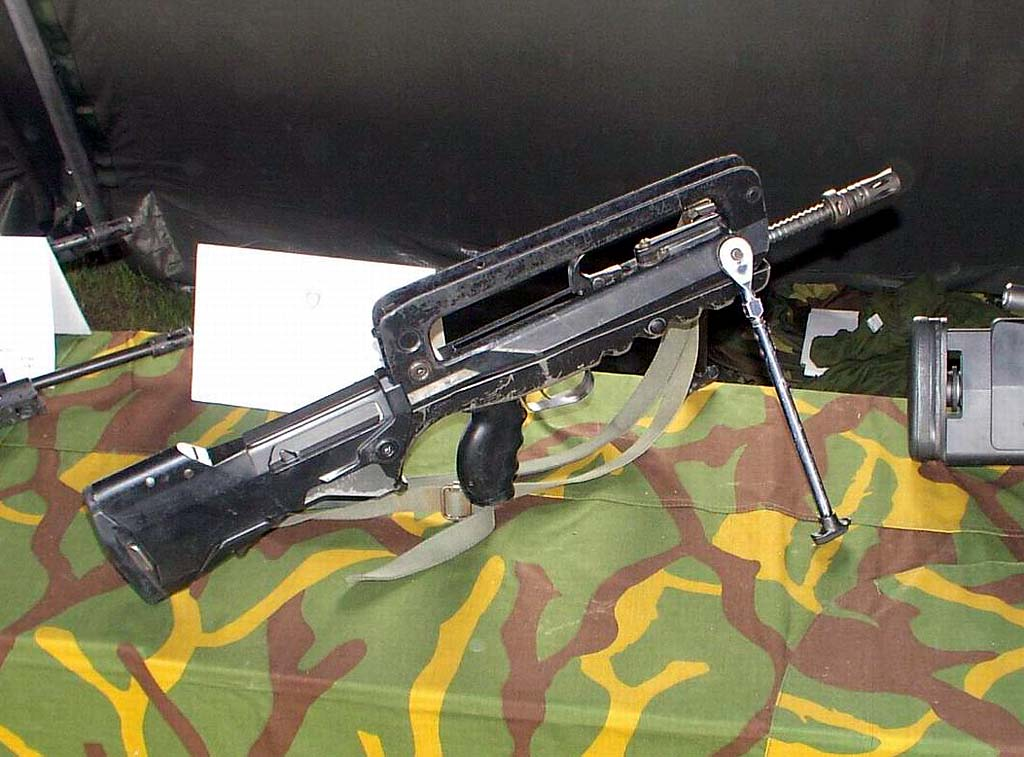
FAMAS F1 used by Serbian Police Special Forces

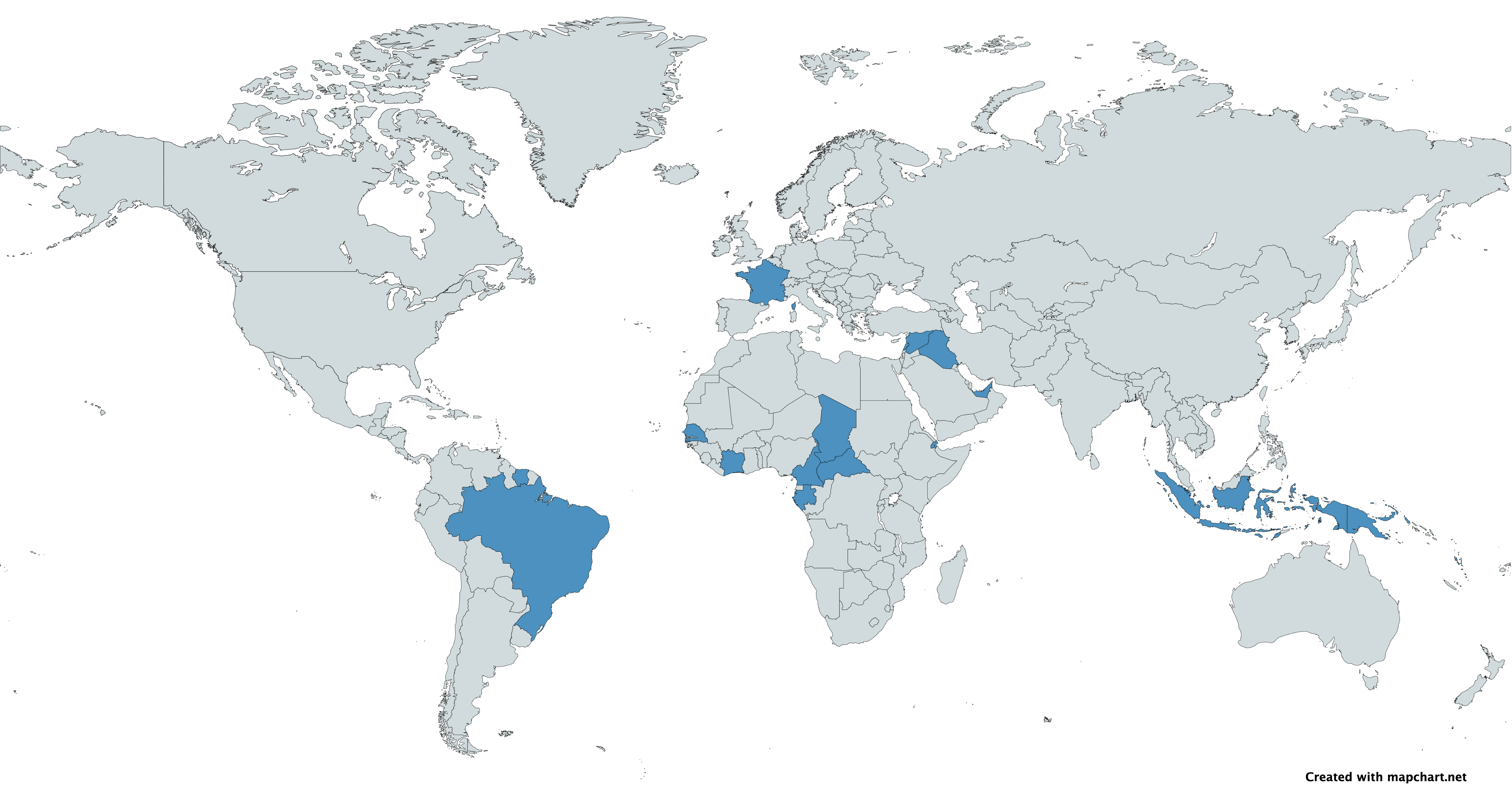
A map with FAMAS users in blue

- Argentina: G2 types bought in the 1990s for the Amphibious Commando Group.
- Brazil: Special forces.
- Cambodia: Used by Cambodian troops during the coup in 1997.
- Cameroon: Used by BIR.
- Central African Republic
- Chad: Presidential Guard and Army.
- Djibouti
- France: Used by the GIGN and French Armed Forces since 1979, with over 700,000 rifles purchased. Began to be replaced by the Heckler & Koch HK416 starting in 2017. Also used by several law enforcement agencies.
- Gabon
- Indonesia: Komando Pasukan Katak (KOPASKA) tactical diver group and Komando Pasukan Khusus (Kopassus) special forces group.
- Iraq
  - Kurdistan
    - Peshmerga
- Ivory Coast: Alassane Ouattara's FRCI are said to have received some FAMAS in 2011 but that claim is disputed.
- Lebanon
- Papua New Guinea: Used in 2012 mutiny, likely "acquired" from F1 rifle stocks in Vanuatu.
- Russia: Some captured by Russian troops in the Russo-Ukrainian War.
- Senegal
- Suriname: On September 14-15, 2023, an unknown number of FAMAS were donated to the Suriname army to help them fight against illegal fishing and gold mining.
- Syria: FAMAS F1s used by the Syrian Arab Army and Kurds.
- Ukraine: 1,000 FAMAS delivered by France in response to the Russian invasion of Ukraine.
- United Arab Emirates
- Vanuatu: Provided by France as military assistance to Vanuatu Mobile Forces to replace their L1A1 Self-Loading Rifles in 2009. Reportedly used FAMAS F1s in 1994.

=== Non-state actors ===
- Iraqi insurgents
- ISIS / Islamic State
- Kurdistan: Peshmerga
- Kanak and Socialist National Liberation Front
- Taliban: Captured from French troops killed in Afghanistan.

== See also ==
- HS Produkt VHS – (Croatia)
- IFAR 22 – (Indonesia)

== Sources and references ==
Preceded by Fusil MAS-49	French Army rifle 1981–present	Succeeded by HK416
