= Orolia =

Manufacturer of precision time and frequency instruments

- Founded: 2005
- Headquarters: San Diego, United States
- Website: www.orolia.com/en/

Orolia, Inc. (formerly Spectracom Corporation) was a global manufacturer of precision time and frequency instruments and network-centric equipment used in a wide range of industries.

Spectracom was founded in Rochester, New York USA in 1972. Its first product was a WWVB Receiver-Comparator, an instrument used to calibrate oscillators with traceability to national standards. Other early products included WWVB frequency and time standards which offered atomic clock accuracy at a fraction of the cost. This led to widespread use of these products in vital communications networks, such as two-way police radio simulcast systems, and master clocks for accurate time stamping of data and events within emergency call centers (such as 9-1-1 public safety answering points). When GPS signals became publicly available in the 1990s, Spectracom began offering its time and frequency products with embedded GPS receivers. These products are known by the registered trademarks Ageless and NetClock, the second being a popular brand of network time servers and master clocks.

In 2005, Spectracom acquired the KSI line of bus-level timing products. These plug-in computer or instrument chassis cards provide precise timing within dedicated applications using GPS or IRIG timecode.

In 2007, Spectracom was acquired by the Orolia Group and operated as part of its Timing, Test & Measurement group. The Spectracom brand has been applied to other Orolia acquisitions: Temex Sync, France (2007), Rapco Electronics, UK (2008), and Pendulum Instruments, Sweden (2009).

In 2022, Orolia was acquired by Safran and its facilities now operate in Safran's Navigation & Timing division.

== WWVB changes affect early products ==
In 2012, the NIST made changes to the WWVB broadcast signal, which was used for synchronization within, among others, early Spectracom devices. While the signal changes were compatible with more recent equipment using those broadcasts, Spectracom has provided a list of older equipment, unsupported since 2005, which will no longer function properly as a result of the WWVB change:

Model	Product Name/Type
8160	Frequency Standard Receiver/Oscillator
8161	Frequency Standard Receiver/Oscillator
8163	WWVB Receiver/Phase Comparator
8164	Ageless Master Oscillator
8165	Ageless Master Oscillator
8170	Synchronized Clock
8171	Synchronized Clock
8182	NetClock/2 Master Clock
