= Swing (surname) =

Swing is an English language surname. People with this surname include:

- Catherine Swing, Canadian television personality, director, and producer
- David Swing (1830–1894), American teacher and clergyman
- DeVante Swing (born 1969), American musician, songwriter, and record producer
- Jordan Swing (born 1990), American professional basketball player
- Joseph May Swing (1894–1984), American senior United States Army officer
- Phil Swing (1884–1963), American Republican politician from California
- Wes Swing (born 1982), American singer and songwriter based in Virginia
- William E. Swing (born 1936), American Episcopalian priest from West Virginia, Bishop of California from 1980 to 2006
