= Abhinav Kamal =

Indian businessman (born 1889)

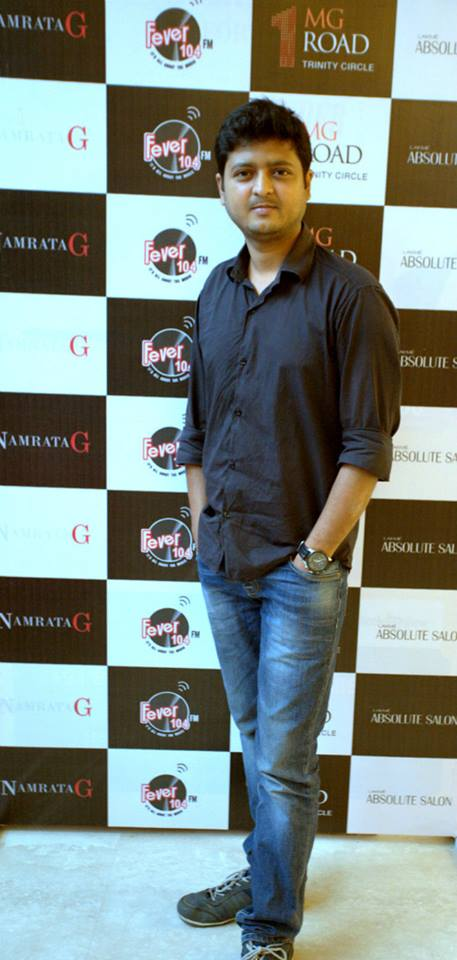
- Abhinav Kamal (2015)

Abhinav Kamal (born 2 July 1989) is an Indian entrepreneur, film director, producer and screenwriter. Kamal made his directorial debut with On the Other Side, a psychological thriller, while he was a student at Institute of Management Technology, Nagpur. The film was showcased under Shamiana. As a filmmaker, he is known for an award-winning English - Kannada documentary, Pujari Umma Shankar. He is also known for his work in an Australian English independent film as an associate director. Abhinav has also Directed the Medical Humor web series Starting Troubles, featuring Renuka Shahane and Parikshit Sahani

== Awards ==
Documentary Pujari Umma Shankar was awarded with the 2nd Best Film Award at The Cannes International Aesthetic Film festival 2013 in France.
