= M9 rifle grenade =

M9
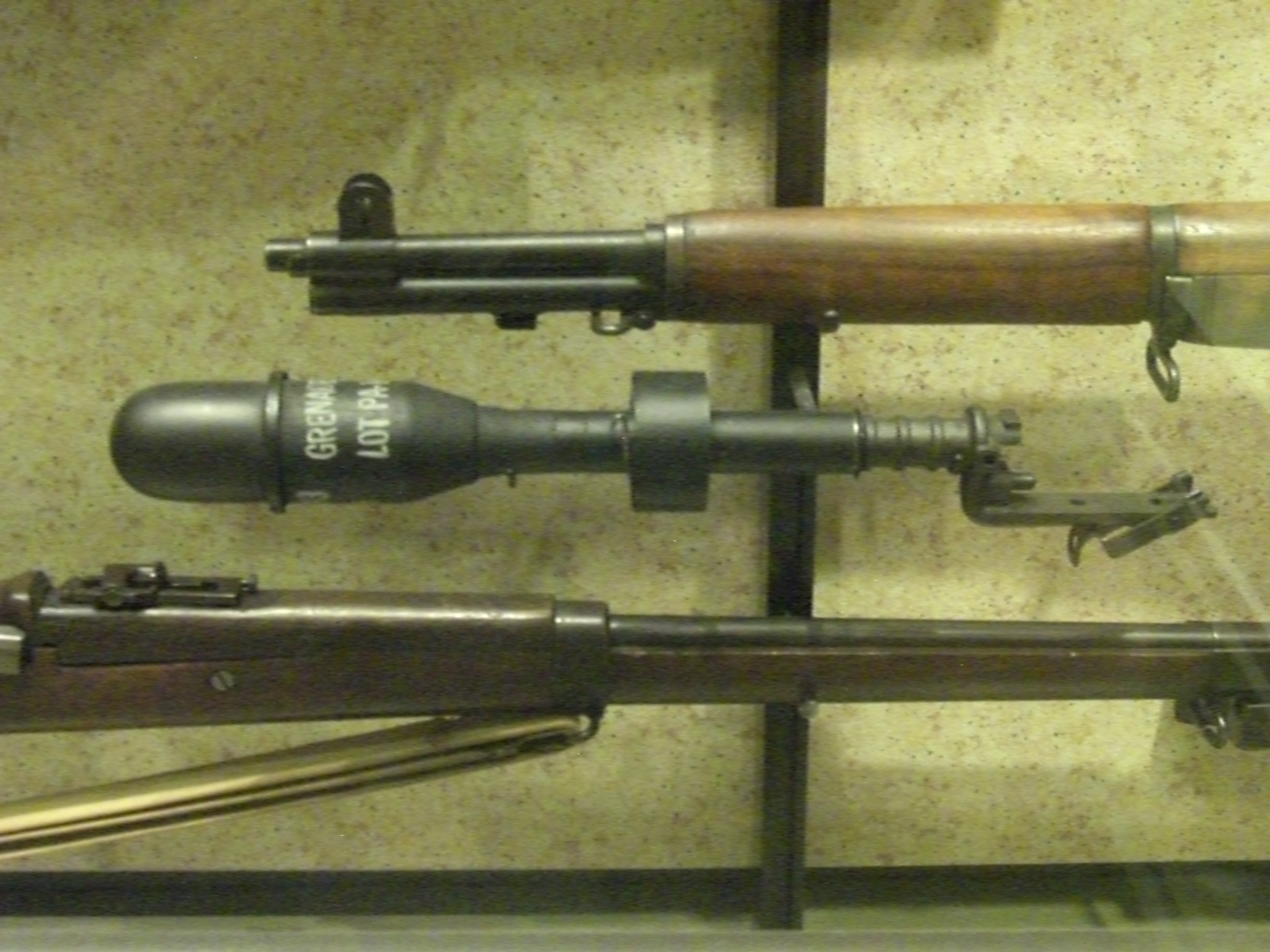
- An M9 grenade on an M7 grenade launching adapter
- Type: Rifle Grenade
- Place of origin: United States

Service history
- Used by: United States; Australia; Canada; India; Pakistan; United Kingdom; China; North Vietnam

Production history
- Produced: January 1942–July 1945
- No. built: ~26,876,000
- Variants: M9A1, Type 64

Specifications
- Mass: 590 g (21 oz)
- Length: 284 mm (11.2 in)
- Diameter: 48 mm (1.9 in)
- Filling: Pentolite
- Filling weight: 113 g (4.0 oz)

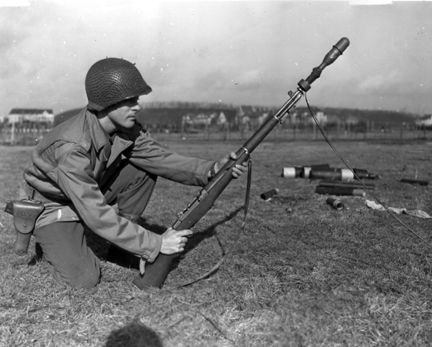
M9 rifle grenade being launched from an M1 Garand

The M9 rifle grenade was an American anti-tank rifle grenade used during World War II. The earlier-designed M10 grenade was too heavy to be fired an effective distance by a rifle; the M9 was conceived as a lighter version of that design. (The M10 became part of the evolution of the bazooka.)

Towards the end of the Second World War, the M9's limited effect against heavy German tanks began to be noticed. Its ineffectiveness on heavy armor became apparent when US forces engaged T-34 tanks in the Korean War. It was replaced in the anti-tank role by the M28, an American version of the Energa rifle grenade, which was itself replaced several years later by the M31 HEAT rifle grenade.

The M9 was adopted by the British as the No. 85 grenade in 1944, and was similarly superseded by the Energa in British service during the 1950s. This new munition in the Commonwealth armoury required adapted discharger cartridges, which were made in the UK, Canada, Australia, India and Pakistan.

China adopted a copy of the M9A1 rifle grenade, as Type 64. It was used by North Vietnamese forces during the Vietnam War, and was fired from AT-44 grenade launchers fitted on M44 Mosin-Nagant carbines.

== Description ==
"GRENADE, ANTITANK, M9A1 —STANDARD—

The antitank grenade, M9A1, has a sheet steel body and tail assembly and weighs 1.23 pounds [560 g]. The body is filled with 4 ounces [110 g] of Pentolite using the “hollow charge” principle. The tail contains the impact fuze and the stabilizing fin is spot welded on a stabilizer tube screwed to the head. The impact fuze consists of a firing pin held by a spring in flight. When shipped, the firing pin is retained by a safety pin. When the grenade strikes a target the pin moves forward to activate the detonator and explode the charge. The hollow shaped charge of this grenade has remarkable armor-penetrating qualities, The M9A1 anti-tank rifle grenade supersedes the grenade, A.T., M9."

WAR DEPARTMENT, INFANTRY FIELD MANUAL § WEAPON AND AMMUNITION TECHNICAL MANUAL, INFANTRY REGIMENT, PARACHUTE, June 1944, Page 43
