= STRIM 65 =

Cold War-era French rifle grenade

- Type: Rifle grenade
- Place of origin: France

Service history
- Used by: France; Rhodesia; South African Defence Force
- Wars: Rhodesian Bush War; South African Border War; Lebanese Civil War

Production history
- Designer: STRIM
- Designed: 1961
- Manufacturer: Hotchkiss-Brandt, licence manufacture by Mecar

Specifications
- Mass: 735 g (25.9 oz)
- Length: 420 mm (17 in)
- Diameter: 65 mm (2.6 in)
- Maximum firing range: 120 m (130 yd)
- Filling: Hexolite HEAT charge with 300 mm (12 in) RHA penetration
- Filling weight: 270 g (9.5 oz)

The STRIM 65 is an anti-tank rifle grenade that the French Army used from 1961 to 1978, under the designation 65 AC 28. This and the older 73mm Modèle 1950 (similar in appearance to an Energa grenade) were the standard anti-tank munitions in French service. A 22 mm grenade launching adapter mounted atop the rifle's barrel held the grenade until the firing of a ballistite (blank) cartridge provided the propulsive force to launch the grenade.

Mecar, under licence, also made the grenade in Belgium, and a licence was also granted to Armscor of South Africa.

The AC58 rifle grenade manufactured by Luchaire replaced the STRIM 65. The AC58 used a new bullet trap form of propulsion, thereby doing away with the need for a special launching round.

The Brazilian M2 anti-personnel and M3 anti-tank rifle grenades bear a strong similarity to the STRIM 40 and STRIM 65 respectively.
