= No. 68 AT grenade =

Grenade, rifle No. 68 /AT
- The Mark 1 No. 68 rifle grenade, shown with the nose facing left
- Type: Anti-tank rifle grenade
- Place of origin: United Kingdom

Service history
- In service: 1940–1945

Production history
- Designed: 1940
- Variants: Mk 1 to Mk VI

Specifications
- Mass: 894 grams (31.5 oz)
- Diameter: 2.5 inches (64 mm)
- Effective firing range: 70 yd (64 m)
- Filling: Lyddite, Pentolite or RDX/beeswax
- Filling weight: 156 grams (5.5 oz)
- Detonation mechanism: Impact

The Grenade, Rifle No. 68 / Anti-Tank was a British anti-tank rifle grenade used during the Second World War and was one of the first operational weapons to utilise the shaped charge principle.

== Design ==
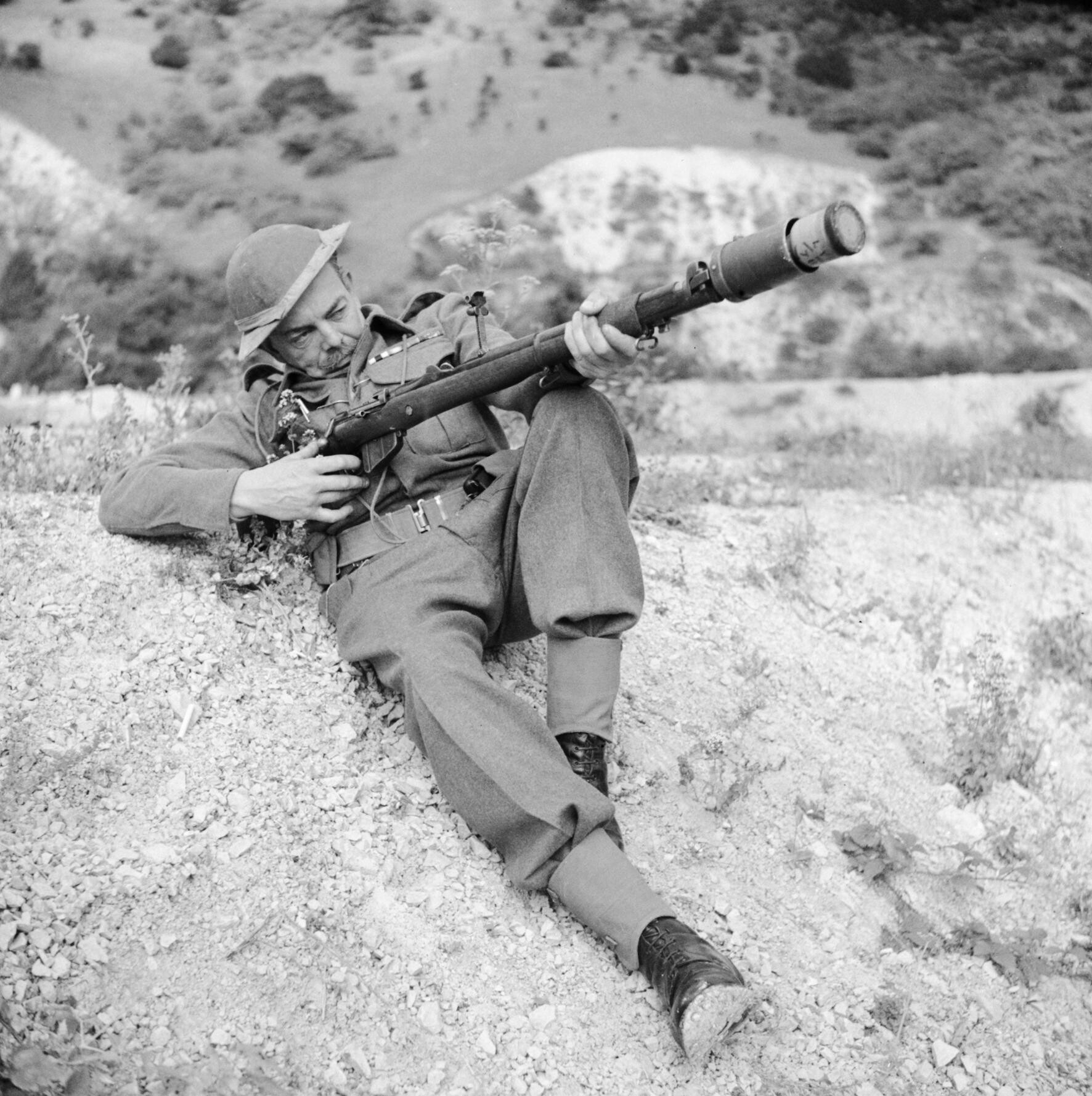
A member of the Home Guard demonstrates a Lee-Enfield rifle equipped to fire an anti-tank grenade, Dorking, 3 August 1942.

British research into shaped charges in the inter-war period brought about some useful progress but did not result in any weapons. Development of the grenade started in late 1939, after a demonstration arranged for a British military commission of a series of anti-tank rifle grenades and artillery warheads at the Swiss Army Proving Ground at Thun in Switzerland, which had been designed by Henry Mohaupt. Guessing that Mohaupt's weapons were using the hollow charge principle, the British abandoned negotiations and began development of a rifle grenade based on their own previous work.

The No. 68 has some claim to have been the first high-explosive anti-tank (HEAT) device in use. The design of the warhead was simple and was capable of penetrating 52 mm (2.0 in) of armour.

The fuze of the grenade was armed by removing a pin in the tail which prevented the firing pin from flying forward. The grenade was launched from a rifle cup. The simple fins gave it some stability in the air and, provided the grenade hit the target at the proper angle (90 degrees), the charge would be effective. Detonation occurred on impact, when a striker in the tail of the grenade overcame the resistance of a creep spring and was thrown forward into a stab detonator.

The grenade was fired, as was the No. 36M Mills bomb, from a specially adapted Lee-Enfield Rifle No. 1 EY, (Note: Sources vary over the origin of the term "EY", perhaps a contraction of "Emergency" (i.e. for emergency use only), or alternatively, the initials of Edwin Yule, the inventor of the cup discharger.) often converted from a rifle that was unfit for general use and had been marked "DP" for drill purpose. The converted rifles were strengthened by adding an extra bolt to secure the breech mechanism to the stock, and by a cord binding which was fastened around the forestock. A special Ballistite high-explosive cartridge was required to propel the grenade. The grenade itself was held in place by the 2 1/2 inches (64 mm) discharger cup No. 1 Mk I. With the weapon's introduction into Home Guard use, the Adaptor No. 1 and the Discharger No. 2 Mk I were introduced, which allowed grenades to be launched from the M1917 Enfield rifle with which they were equipped, although a contemporary manual warned that rifles used for that purpose were likely to be "somewhat spoilt as a precision weapon".

== Service ==
The No. 68 grenade entered service with the British Army in November 1940. However, it proved to be not much better than the inadequate Boys anti-tank rifle and could not be improved as the size of the explosive charge was limited by the diameter of the discharger cup, It was introduced into service with the Home Guard in February 1941 and was retained until the force stood-down in 1944.

A British manual of 1942, reflecting experience gained in the field, stated that the effective range of the grenade was 50 to 70 yards (45 to 65 metres) and would be best employed against the rear armour of enemy tanks after they had been allowed to pass.
