= M7 grenade launcher =

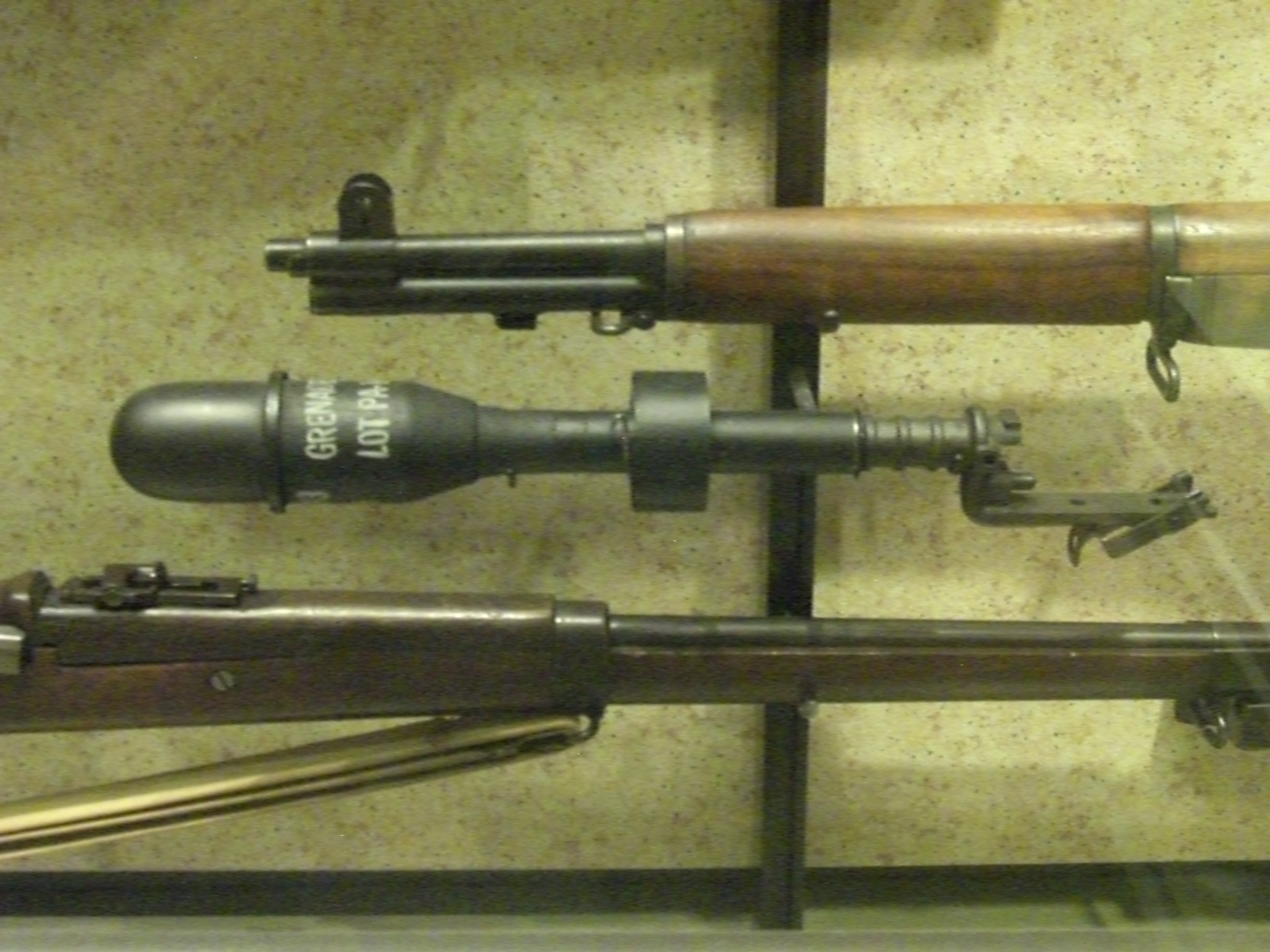
- M1 Garand (top); M9 rifle grenade on M7A3 grenade launcher (middle)
- Type: Rifle grenade launcher attachment
- Place of origin: United States

Service history
- In service: 1943–1957
- Used by: United States; Philippine Commonwealth; Philippine Republic; Army of the Republic of Vietnam
- Wars: World War II; Korean War; Hukbalahap Rebellion; Vietnam War

The M7 grenade launcher, formally rifle grenade launcher, M7, was a 22 mm rifle grenade launcher attachment for the M1 Garand rifle that saw widespread use in World War II and the Korean War. One end of the tube-shaped device slotted over the muzzle of the rifle and attached to the bayonet mount, and the other end held the grenade. When a blank cartridge was fired, its expanding gases propelled the grenade up to 200 metres (220 yards), far more than the 30 metres (33 yards) achieved by a hand-thrown grenade.

Anti-armor (M9), Fragmentation (M17), and smoke grenades (M22) were available for the M7.

== Development ==
When the United States entered World War II, infantrymen were issued the Mk 2 fragmentation hand grenade. It could generally be thrown only about 35 yards (32 meters), was ineffective against armored targets, and had a lightweight charge that was deadly only out to about 6 yards (5.5 meters). For longer ranges, rifle grenade attachments were available for the M1903 Springfield (M1 grenade launcher) and M1917 Enfield (M2 grenade launcher). By 1943, these rifles had been all but replaced in frontline service by the M1 Garand, so U.S. Army Ordnance designed a new launcher attachment, designated the M7, that could fire much heavier grenades up to 250 yards. M7-compatible fragmentation grenades could kill up to 11 yards (10 meters) away from its explosion. It entered production and service in 1943.

== Design details and employment ==
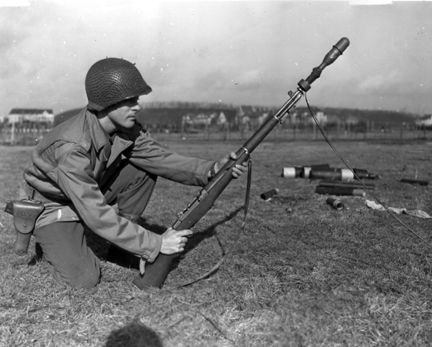
An American soldier demonstrating the use of the M7 grenade launcher to fire a practice grenade with a wire or rope attached using his M1 Garand.

The M7 grenade launcher was a tube-shaped device with an overall length (including the mounting bracket) of 7.5 inches. One end fitted onto the barrel of the M1 Garand rifle enclosing the muzzle, and was held in place with the rifle's bayonet lug. The other end was cylindrical with a small clip that held the grenade in place by friction. To launch a grenade, a special high-powered blank cartridge made specifically for the purpose (the .30-06 Springfield M3 grenade cartridge) was chambered in the rifle. Using markings engraved onto the device to determine the desired range, the rifle grenade was slipped over the launcher. When fired, the resulting expanding gases propelled the grenade a considerable distance depending on the grenade type, the vertical angle that the rifle was held, and how far the grenade was positioned onto the launcher. Since the device disabled the semi-automatic function of the rifle to prevent damage to the gun from firing grenades, the rifle could not be fired normally when the M7 launcher was in place; the gun could be fired in an emergency by cycling the action by hand. Fragmentation, anti-tank, and smoke grenades and pyrotechnic signals were available along with an adapter to enable the use of hand grenades. One to three M7 grenade launchers were issued to each rifle squad depending on period. It was also issued to support and headquarters elements.

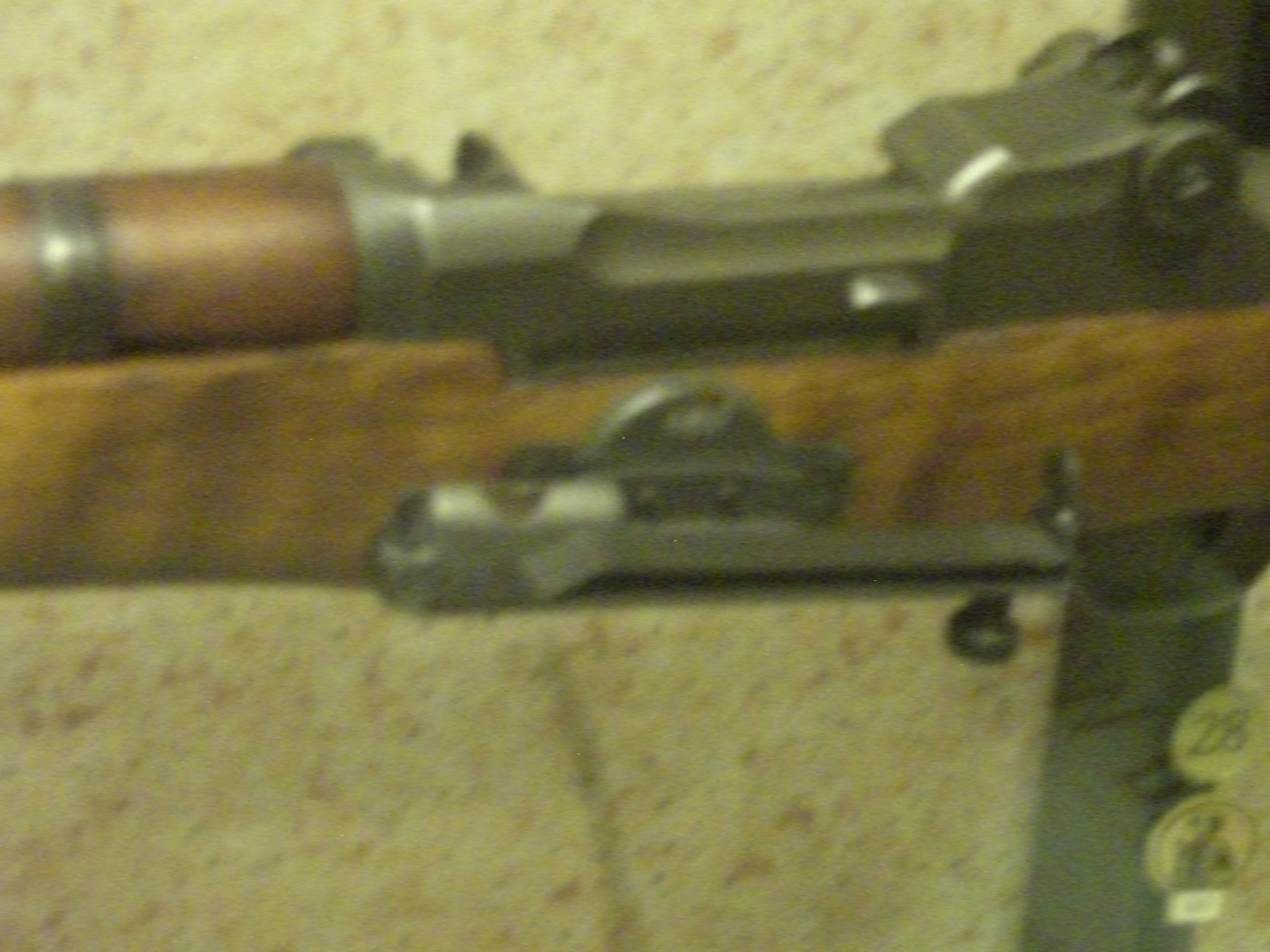
M15 auxiliary sight on the left side an M1 Garand.

The M7 series grenade launcher came with accessories. The M15 auxiliary sight was mounted on the left side of the stock accompanied by a template to allow it to be properly positioned on the stock. A spirit level allowed the user to figure out the arc of the weapon to aid in aiming the grenade. A rubber recoil boot (part No. B200968) could be slipped on the butt of the Garand's stock to reduce recoil when it was fired.

The M7 Auxiliary Grenade Cartridge booster charge, or "Vitamin Pill", could be inserted into the M7 grenade launcher's muzzle to increase its range by an additional 100 to 150 yards. These booster charges were made from cut-down .45 Colt revolver cartridges, with a small hole in the base and a red cardboard disc inside the case over the charge. The charge was loaded into the launcher's muzzle like a shotgun shell (with the rim keeping it in place) and the rifle grenade was slid into place over it. When the blank cartridge was fired, its flame would travel up the rifle's barrel, ignite the booster charge, and propel the booster cartridge into the base of the rifle grenade. The booster cartridge would fall out of the rifle grenades tail fin assembly in flight.

== M8 grenade launcher ==
The M8 grenade launcher was similar except it was designed to be mounted on the M1 carbine and used the .30 Carbine M6 grenade cartridge. Users of the M8 needed to be careful to fire it with the M1 Carbine's stock braced sideways and cushioned on a sandbag, as the recoil could crack or break the stock.

== Improved models ==
- M7A1 (Springfield Armory T95) [July 1945 – 1951]: The major problem with the M7 grenade launcher is that it left the gas cylinder lock closed when attached, venting the cylinder. This meant the operator would have to cock the weapon to extract the spent cartridge and load a fresh one from the en-bloc clip. The M7A1 incorporated a spring-loaded piston designed to keep the gas cylinder closed when loaded until the grenade was fired, but then opened to allow normal semi-automatic function. The spring-loaded launcher also recoiled when fired, preventing damage to the rifle. The M1 Garand design was modified to use a hardened gas cylinder lock (marked with an 'H', for "hardened") dubbed the "flat-edged lock" (ordnance part No. 7265959). This allowed prolonged use of the new launcher system.
- M7A2 [July 1951 – 1952]: The only problem with the M7A1 was that sometimes the launcher would get stuck when fired or the gas cylinder lock would break. This rendered the rifle and launcher useless and required repair by an armorer with special tools. The jamming problem was solved by using a heavier spring-loaded piston on the launcher and introduced a redesigned grenade retaining spring. The M1 Garand was then modified with a distinctive dual gas cylinder lock (marked with a 'M', for "modified") dubbed the "high hump lock" (ordnance part No. 7265871). The launcher had a mount machined into it to take a proposed leaf-sight that was never adopted.
- M7A3 (ordnance part No. 7266167) [September, 1952 – 1961]: During the Korean War, it was found that World War II–era anti-tank grenades were useless against the Soviet T-34 tanks fielded by the North Korean Army. A new high-velocity anti-tank rifle grenade called the Mecar ENERGA (dubbed the M28 in US Army service) was soon issued. However, its grenade launcher (dubbed the T119) had the same problems as the original M7 launcher and the M28 was inaccurate when launched from the M7A2. The M7A2 launcher was simply redesigned with a longer tube to fire the improved grenades and could be used with either the "flat edge" or "high hump" lock. After the war (from early 1956 to late 1959), it could be fitted with a leaf-sight that was calibrated for use with the M28. The M7A3 kit (ordnance part No. 5750089) consisted of an M7A3 launcher packed with a "high hump" gas lock to allow the grenadier to upgrade an earlier model M1 Garand to the new specification.

== See also ==
- List of U.S. Army weapons by supply catalog designation (SNL B-39)
- M1 fragmentation grenade adapter
- M2 gas grenade adapter
- M9 High-Explosive Anti-Tank (HEAT) rifle grenade (1942–1951)
- M17 Fragmentation rifle grenade
- M28 HEAT rifle grenade (1952–1959)
- M31 HEAT rifle grenade (1959–1977)
