= STRIM 40 =

French rifle grenade

- Type: Rifle grenade
- Place of origin: France

Service history
- Used by: Belgium; Rhodesia; South Africa

Production history
- Manufacturer: STRIM, licence manufacture by Mecar

Specifications
- Mass: 515 g (18.2 oz)
- Length: 315 mm (12.4 in)
- Diameter: 40 mm (1.6 in)
- Maximum firing range: 150 m (160 yd)

The STRIM 40 is an anti-personnel rifle grenade of French design and manufacture.

In addition to being manufactured in France, it was also made under licence in Belgium by Mecar, with the designation "AP 32 Z", and an enhanced version with the designation "AP 32 ZA".

It was propelled by being mounted atop a rifle's 22 mm grenade launching adapter, and being launched by a ballistite (blank) cartridge. In common with other rifle grenades of this era, they became obsolescent when the bullet trap form of propulsion became popular at the end of the 1970s.

Production had ceased in France by 1980. Whilst the Belgian army went on to use the new generation of bullet trap grenades, Mecar did continue to manufacture it for export customers into the mid 1980s

The Brazilian manufactured M2 anti-personnel and M3 anti-tank rifle grenades bear a strong similarity to the STRIM 40 and STRIM 65 respectively.

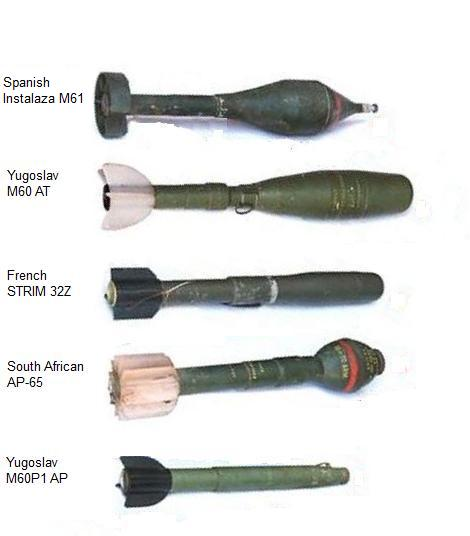
Instalaza grenade and other rifle grenades as encountered during the South African border war in Angola and Namibia.
