= Wasp 58 =

- Type: Recoilless rocket launcher
- Place of origin: France

Service history
- In service: 1987-present
- Used by: See users
- Wars: Rwandan Civil War

Production history
- Manufacturer: Luchaire SA
- No. built: over 450,000

Specifications
- Mass: 3 kg (6.6 lb)
- Length: 800 mm (31 in)
- Crew: 1
- Cartridge: HEAT antiarmour warhead
- Cartridge weight: 615 g (21.7 oz)
- Caliber: 58 mm (2.3 in)
- Rate of fire: single-shot
- Muzzle velocity: 250 m/s (820 ft/s)
- Effective firing range: 20–400 m (22–437 yd)

External images
- Wasp 58
- Soldier shown with first Wasp 58 design
- First Wasp 58 launcher design

The Wasp 58 is a 58-mm rocket launcher antitank weapon developed in France in the late 1980s. The weapon was, originally, privately developed by the French firm Luchaire SA, subsidiary of GIAT.

== History ==
In the early 1980s, Luchaire's sales department had noted the rising costs of light individual anti-armour/assault weapons were to the point that fewer and fewer could be purchased and that there was a need for a one-man anti-armor/assault weapon which could be purchased for a cost slightly higher than that of a rifle grenade, but with the greater accuracy and ease of use of a one-man rocket launcher.

The world export markets was the major considerations behind the development of the Wasp 58 by Luchaire.

The Wasp 58 was first sold in 1987. It has been a commercial success with over 450,000 produced, including licensed production in Greece.

== Design ==
The Wasp 58 is a direct-fire weapon used to attack lightly armored vehicles at ranges up to 300 metres. It can also be used against bunkers or as a fire support weapon. The Wasp 58 is a one-man disposable weapon system based on the recoilless principle. On ignition the propellant fires the 58-mm projectile forward while at the same time ejecting a counter mass of plastic chips to the rear to achieve a recoilless effect. The plastic chips due to their size and weight lose any velocity after 1 metre of travel from the back of the launcher. The projectile is stabilized by six fins that unfold and lock into place after leaving the tube.

The designers of the Wasp 58 made it compact and simple to operate with a small launch signature. This enables it to be fired from enclosed spaces, including from small rooms in buildings, and protects the user from having his position revealed. The Wasp 58 is composed of a sealed launch tube manufactured from fibreglass reinforced plastic. The Wasp 58's HEAT antiarmour warhead is 58-mm in diameter and is based on the Grenade à fusil antichar de 58 mm Mle F1 PAB rifle grenade's warhead, also designed and manufactured by Luchaire and in service with the French military and other armies worldwide.

The anti-armour warhead of the Wasp 58 can penetrate 300 mm of rolled homogeneous armour (RHA). While insufficient in penetration for frontal engagements of today's modern main battle tanks, it can engage other armoured targets (wheeled armour vehicles or light tanks) from both frontal and side.

The Wasp 58 requires no annual maintenance or special storage other than that which would be required for other small arms munitions. The Wasp 58 has a hit probability of over 95% when fired against stationary targets (88% against moving targets).

== Users ==
- Belgium
- Denmark
- France: Commandos de l'Air
- Netherlands

=== Non-State Actors ===
- Revolutionary Organization 17 November
