= Mohaupt =

Mohaupt is a German surname. Notable people with the surname include:

- Franz Mohaupt (1854–1916), Bohemian composer, pedagogue and author (Ernst Schelmerding)
- Richard Mohaupt (1904–1957), German-U.S. composer and Kapellmeister
- Henry Mohaupt (1915–2001), Swiss American inventor
- Lutz Mohaupt (born 1942), German Lutheran theologian and politician (CDU)
- Tino Mohaupt (born 1983), German athlete
- Johannes Mohaupt (1898-1973), inventor of the Johannes Mohaupt Theory

See also

- Mohnhaupt
- Monhaupt
