= APAV40 =

French dual-purpose rifle grenade

Anti-personnel/anti-véhicule, 40mm
- Type: Rifle grenade
- Place of origin: France

Service history
- Used by: French Army
- Wars: Lebanese Civil War

Production history
- Designed: 1956

Specifications
- Mass: 405 g (14.3 oz)
- Length: 352 mm (13.9 in)
- Diameter: 53 mm (2.1 in) (outer fins), 40 mm (1.6 in) (head)
- Calibre: 22 mm grenade
- Filling: hexogen-tolite
- Filling weight: 80 g (2.8 oz)

The APAV 40 (anti-personnel/anti-véhicule, 40mm) is a 40 mm dual purpose rifle grenade used by the French Army.

== Design ==
The APAV 40 is a dual purpose, anti-personnel (AP) and anti-vehicle (AV), 40 mm rifle-grenade. It has a mass of 405 g (14.3 oz), and a tail with stabilizing fins. Explosion is triggered by an impact fuse.

Two versions of the APAV 40 exist:

- the older F1 model which must be fired with a blank cartridge
- the current F2 model which uses a bullet-trap that allows using live rounds

== Use ==
Alidade sight system of the FAMAS for direct fire of the APAV40

To launch, the APAV40 F2 is placed over the muzzle of a FAMAS or any NATO rifle with a (22 mm) STANAG muzzle device. Then the rifle is aimed at the target and fired. The impact of the bullet striking the bullet-trap and the expanding gases launch and arm the grenade, which explodes on impact.

In its antipersonnel capacity, the APAV 40 is used in indirect fire. The APAV 40 has a lethal radius of 12 m (13 yd) and its shrapnel is dangerous up to 100 m (110 yd) away.

In its anti-vehicle capacity, the APAV 40 is used in direct fire. Under an optimal angle, the APAV 40 is capable of piercing 100 mm (3.9 in) of armour.

The FAMAS provides an alidade sight for launching the grenade from 170 to 320 m (560 to 1,050 ft). The FAMAS can also be inclined/angled by 45°, to allow fire from 75 to 100 m (246 to 328 ft), with 20-metre increments; or by 74°, to allow fire from 60 to 170 m (200 to 560 ft), with 10 m (11 yd) increments. French rifle grenades are notorious for having extremely strong recoil, so strong that one who does not properly brace themselves will often fall over.

== See also ==
- AC58

== Sources and references ==
French army manual on rifle grenades dated 1966 with an illustration of the APAV 40 (70 MR 61) and text on pages 29 to 31
