= Mohnhaupt =

Mohnhaupt is a German surname. Notable people with the surname include:

- Heinz Mohnhaupt (born 1935), German jurist
- Brigitte Mohnhaupt (born 1949), German female militant (terrorist) associated with the second generation of the Red Army Faction

== See also ==
- Mohaupt
- Monhaupt
