= AC58 =

French rifle grenade

Anti-Char, 58 mm
- Type: Rifle Grenade
- Place of origin: France

Service history
- Used by: French Army

Production history
- Manufacturer: Luchaire SA (now Nexter)

Specifications
- Mass: 500 g (18 oz)
- Length: 380 mm (15 in)
- Diameter: 58 mm (2.3 in)
- Filling: hexogen-tolite

The AC 58 (Anti-Char, 58 mm) is an anti-armour rifle grenade used by the French Army. Its official French Army designation is Grenade à fusil antichar de 58 mm Mle F1 PAB.

== Design ==
The AC 58 comprises a body with a shaped charge warhead and a tail fitted with stabilizing fins. Detonation is initiated by a nose impact and a base fuse. Luchaire designed it at the end of the 1970s to replace the existing STRIM 65 rifle grenade design dating from 1961 that had become obsolete.

The AC 58 uses a bullet trap that allows the use of ball cartridges, rather than the older method that required a blank cartridge to propel the grenade.

== Use ==
To launch, the AC58 is placed over the muzzle of a FAMAS or any NATO rifle with a STANAG muzzle device. Then the rifle is pointed at the target and fired. The impact of the bullet striking the bullet-trap and the expanding gases launches and arms the grenade, which explodes on impact.

The AC58 is used in direct fire. Under an optimal angle, the AC 58 is capable of piercing 350 mm (14 in) of armour. FAMAS provides a built in alidade-type device for aiming to 75 to 100 m (246 to 328 ft).

The Luchaire Wasp 58 individual antiarmour-assault weapon also uses the AC58's warhead.

== See also ==
- APAV40

== Sources and references ==
- TTA 150, p. 109

== External sources ==
Article (in Spanish) with reference to several French rifle grenades
