= Monhaupt =

Monhaupt is a German surname. Notable people with the surname include:

- Ernst Monhaupt (1775–1835), Prussian lieutenant general
- Louise Monhaupt (1836–1918), German stage actress

== See also ==
- Mohaupt
- Mohnhaupt
