= Rifle grenade =

Grenade using a rifle-based launcher

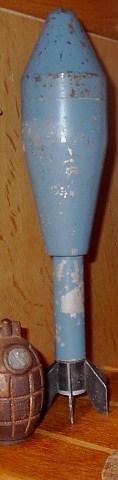
The Belgian ENERGA anti-tank rifle grenade was widely adopted by Western nations.

A rifle grenade is a grenade that uses a rifle-based launcher to permit a longer effective range than would be possible if the grenade were thrown by hand.

The practice of projecting grenades with rifle-mounted launchers was first widely used during World War I and World War II and continues to the present, with the term "rifle grenade" now encompassing many different types of payloads including high explosive, fragmentation, anti-tank warheads, concussion, smoke, incendiary, and flare missiles.

Rifle grenades have largely been supplanted in the infantry fire support role by a combination of grenade launchers (typically affixed to the handguard of rifles) and disposable anti-armor rockets.

== History ==
=== Early use ===
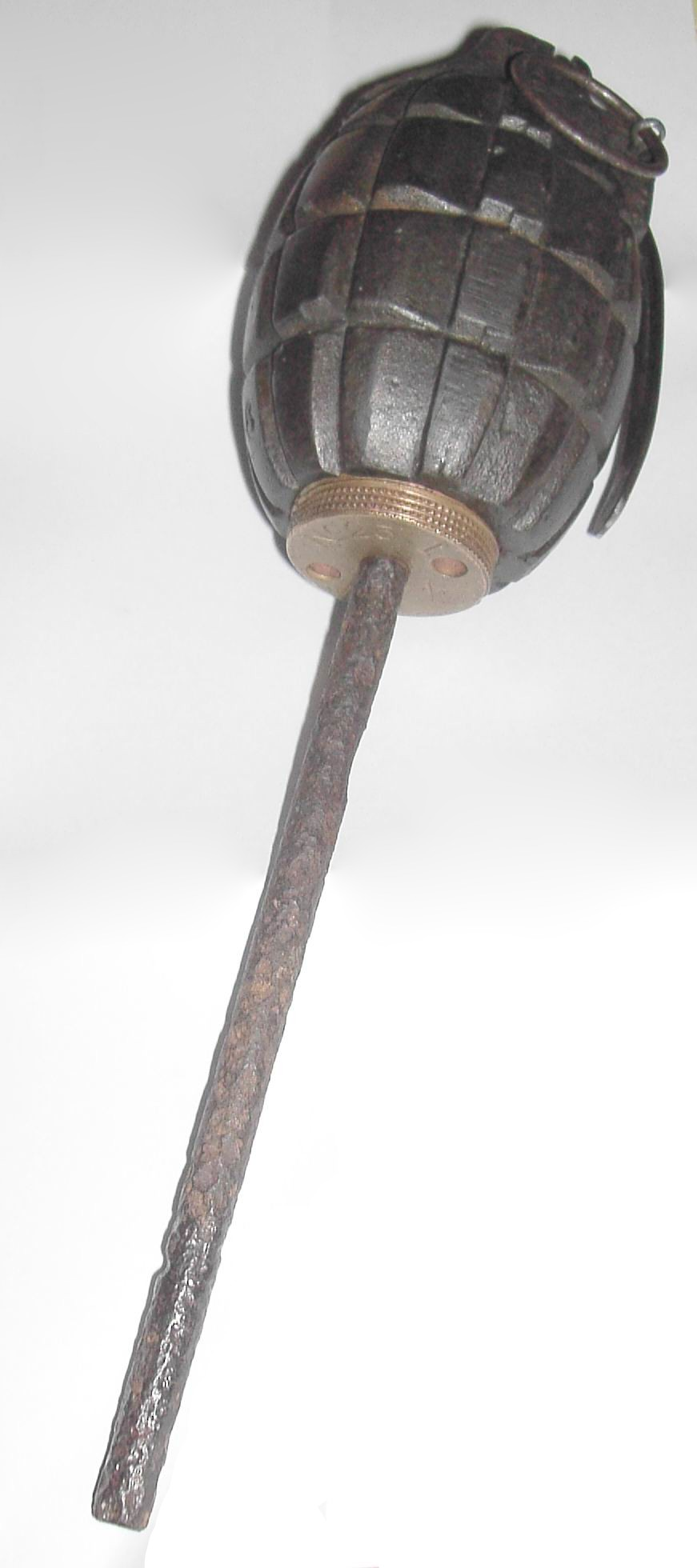
Mills bomb N°23 Mk II, with rod for launch by rifle

Adaptation of grenades for use in rifles began around the 18th century, when cup-shaped dischargers were fitted to the barrels of flintlock muskets, with the grenades propelled by the force of a blank cartridge.

During the early 20th century a Japanese Colonel Amazawa experimented with rifle fired grenades during the Battle of Port Arthur in the Russo-Japanese War, and the idea was further used by the Spanish, though the French were the first to put it to widespread use during the trench warfare of World War I.

In 1912 during the Italo-Turkish War the Aasen rifle grenade was adopted by the Italian Army, it was launched from a M1870 Italian Vetterli carbine.

=== World War I ===
In 1908, Frederick Marten Hale patented the rod grenade. "A simple rod was attached to a specialized grenade, inserted into the barrel of a standard service rifle and launched using a blank cartridge." The British did not immediately adopt the idea and entered World War I without any rifle grenades. However, as soon as the trench warfare started, there was a sudden need for rifle grenades. The British government purchased a rodded variant of the No 2 grenade as a temporary solution.

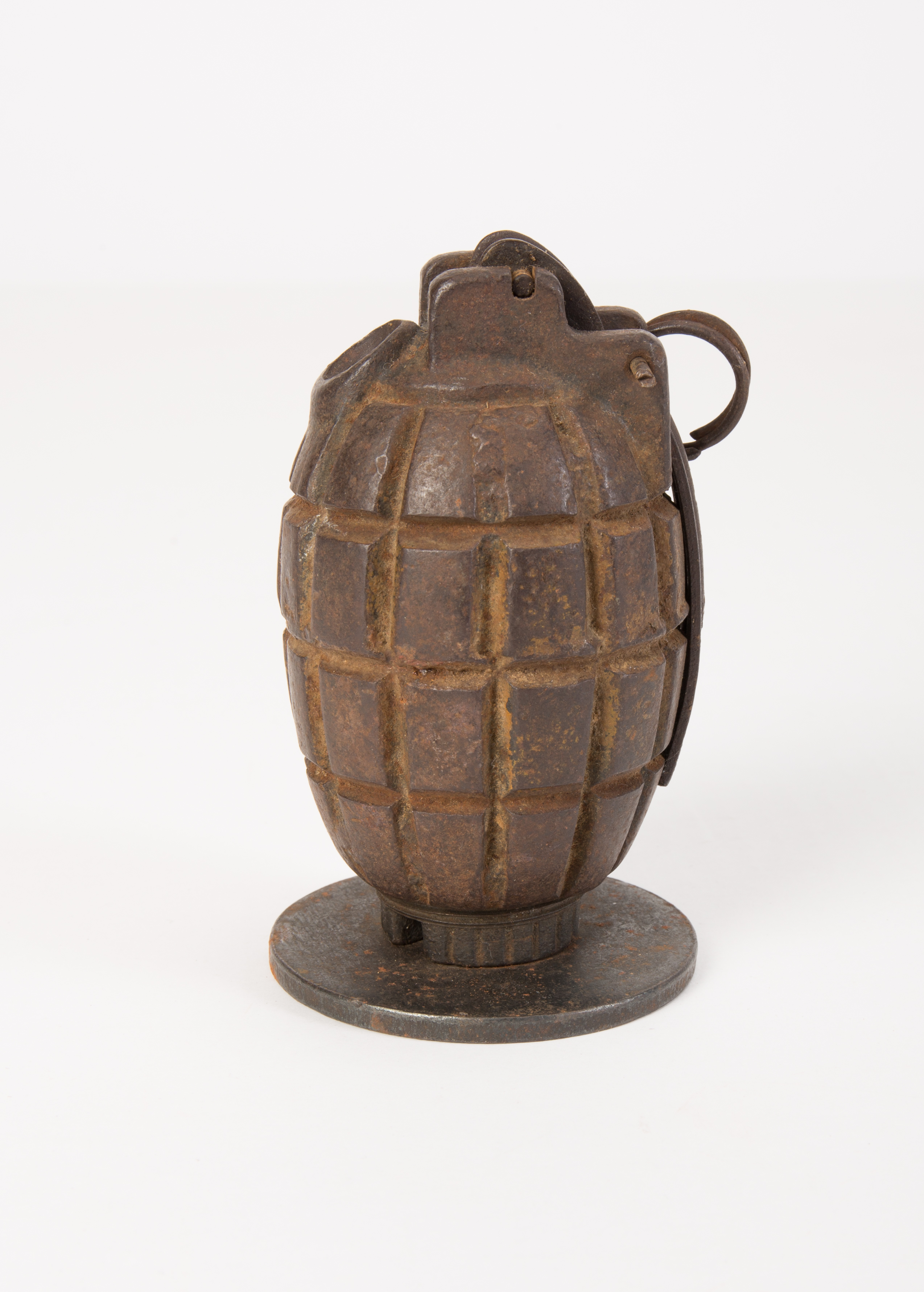
Mills N°36 rifle grenade, with its gas check disk for use with cup-launcher

By 1915, Hales had developed the No 3, which is commonly known as the Hales rifle grenade. The Hales grenade was improved throughout World War I to make it more reliable and easier to manufacture. However, production of the grenade was slow. In order to speed rod grenades to the front, the British also made rodded versions of the Mills bomb.

Although a simple approach, launching a rod grenade "...placed an extreme amount of stress on the rifle barrel and the rifle itself, resulting in the need to dedicate specific rifles to the grenade launching role, as they quickly became useless as an accurate firearm. This led to the search for an alternative and resulted in the reappearance of the cup launcher during the latter years of World War I". After World War I, the rod-type rifle grenade was declared obsolete and the remaining Hales were replaced with gas check equipped Mills Bombs shot from a rifle via a cup launcher.

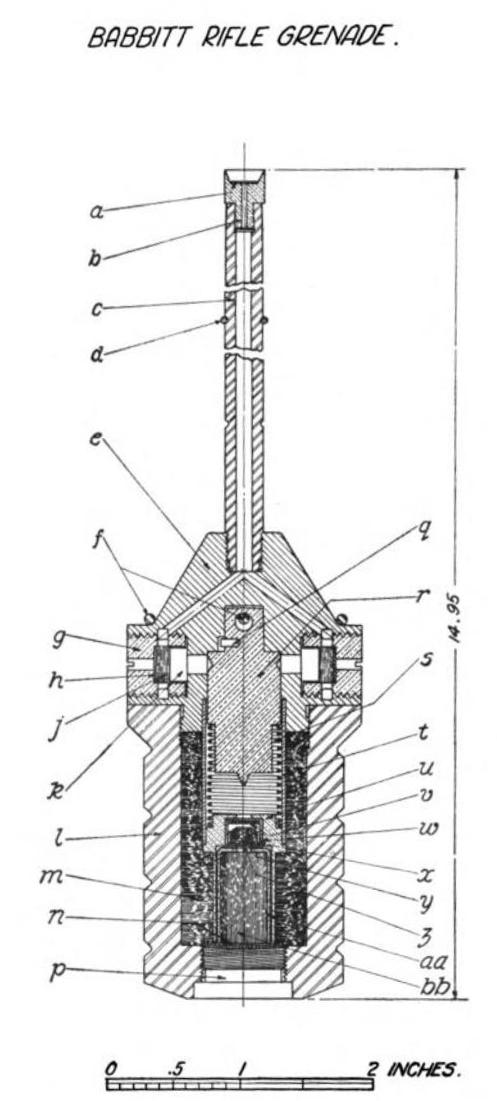
Diagram of a Babbitt rifle grenade, as used in the Springfield 1903 rifle

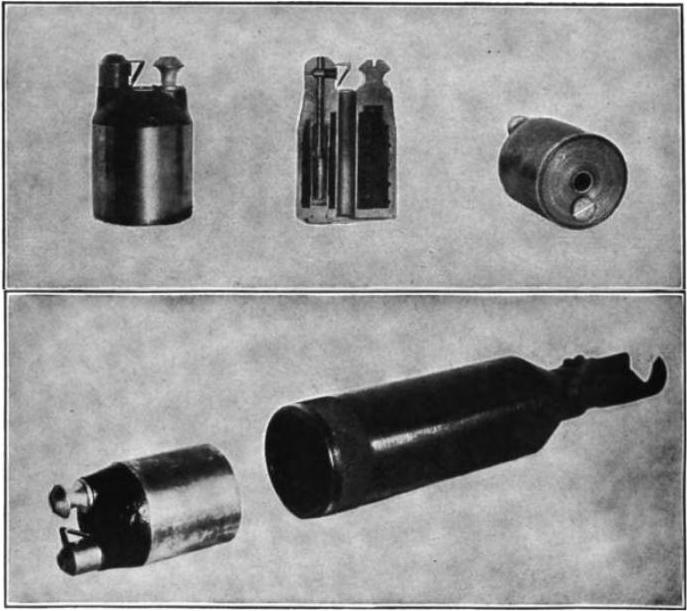
French V-B rifle grenade, a bullet trap type. Top shows views and cutaway of the grenade, bottom shows the grenade and grenade launcher, which is affixed to the rifle. Cross-section shows that the grenade is a pass-through design, allowing the use of live ammunition. Arming tab, activated by the bullet's passage, can also be seen.

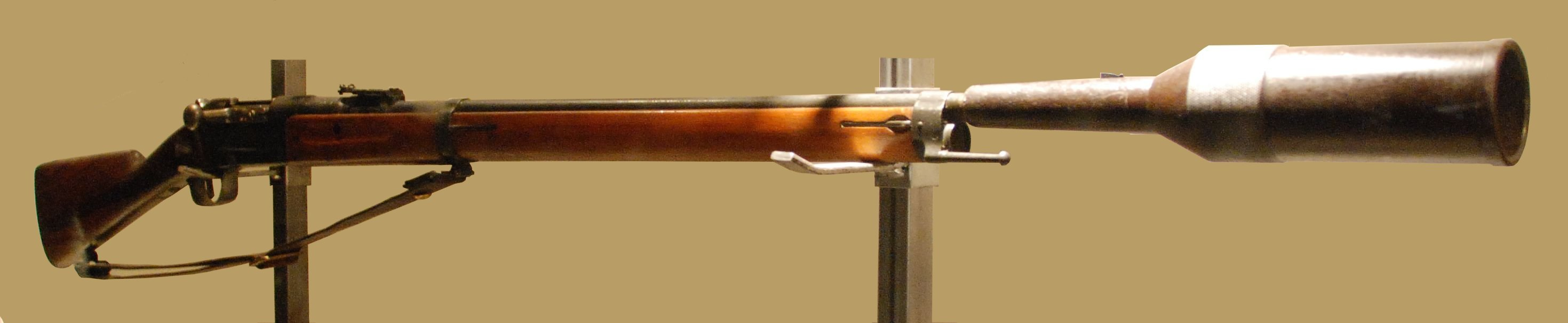
Lebel rifle with VB cup discharger

The French grenade, named the V-B grenade after its inventors, Viven and Bessières, was fired from the standard service rifle with the use of a special adapter and a standard cartridge, providing an effective range of around 175 to 200 yd (160 to 183 m). The grenade had a hollow through the middle, allowing the bullet to pass through, while the muzzle blast was captured by the launching device and used to propel the grenade. The bullet, after passing through the body of the grenade, struck a small plate that ignited the primer. This then lit the fuse in the grenade, providing an eight-second delay before detonation. It could be fired from the shoulder, but due to the heavy recoil and poor balance of the rifle fitted with the grenade, it was more common to fire it with the butt of the rifle resting on the ground, and either held at an appropriate angle, or resting on a tripod. The rifle grenade was useful in offense, particularly in attacking sandbag fortified machine gun nests, as well as in defense. Eight men armed with rifle grenades could fire 150 shots in a minute, providing a heavy barrage to break up an attacker's lines.

Upon entering World War I, the United States attempted to adopt the V-B grenade, but this was not very successful. The difference in bore diameter between the French and American service cartridges (8 mm (0.31 in) vs. 7.62 mm (0.300 in)) meant that the grenade had to be re-designed with a smaller hole, but even this was not sufficient to ensure reliable functioning, due to differences in bullet design. The American bullet would often break apart in the grenade, and this led to the V-B derived grenade design being scrapped in May 1918.

The next United States attempt at a rifle grenade was to return to and develop an improved rod-grenade. The Babbitt grenade, developed by Colonel E. B. Babbitt of the U.S. Ordnance Department, used a long stem projecting from the rear of the grenade, which was slipped into the barrel of the Springfield 1903 rifle, and propelled with a special blank cartridge. The stem was calibrated with a number of grooves and a split ring, which allowed the user to set the grenade to slide a certain distance into the muzzle of the rifle. When the stem was inserted only part way, the chamber pressure upon firing was reduced, propelling the grenade a shorter distance. When fired at a 45-degree angle, ranges from 50 to 300 yd (46 to 274 m) were possible; with the rifle angled at 80 degrees, ranges as short as 15 yd (14 m) were possible. In addition to providing the force to propel the grenade, the gases from firing were directed through a hollow in the stem, and provided force to arm the grenade. Once armed, the grenade had a heavy plunger that would detonate the grenade upon impact.

=== World War II ===
After World War I, the rifle grenade was steadily modified to increase its effectiveness when launched from a rifle.

In 1928, the Italian Army adopted an unusual cup-type 38.5 mm (1.52 in) rifle grenade launcher bolted to the side of a normal Carcano 6.5 mm carbine, the Moschetto di Fanteria Mod. 91/28 con Tromboncino. In use, the rifle's bolt was removed and installed in the launcher chamber. The rifle was placed butt-first against the ground, a grenade loaded down the launcher's muzzle and standard rifle round loaded into the grenade launcher's chamber. When fired, the bullet was trapped, the neck of the cartridge case expanded and the gases passed into launcher's barrel through four holes providing the energy needed to launch the grenade. After the grenade was launched, the chamber was opened, ejecting the spent cartridge case and making the bullet fall out. The necessity of changing the rifle bolt kept the rifle out of use until the bolt could be replaced, a slow and clumsy procedure. The bolt-changing procedure could also result in lost rifle bolts in the heat of battle, putting the weapon out of action completely. As a result, this design was not adopted by any other nation. Today, it can be seen as an early, if unsuccessful ancestor of modern under-barrel grenade launchers such as the M203.

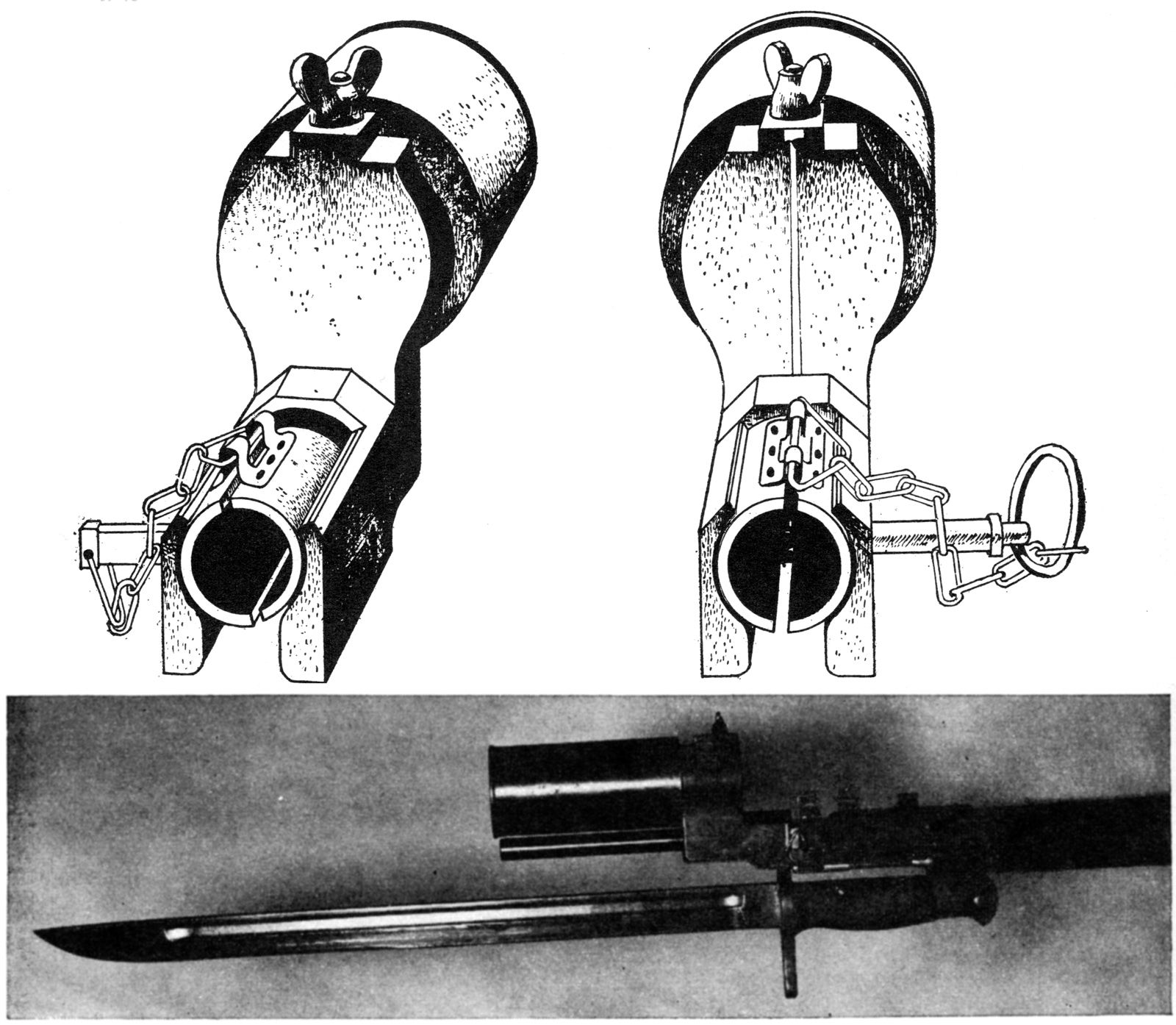
Type 100 rifle grenade launcher

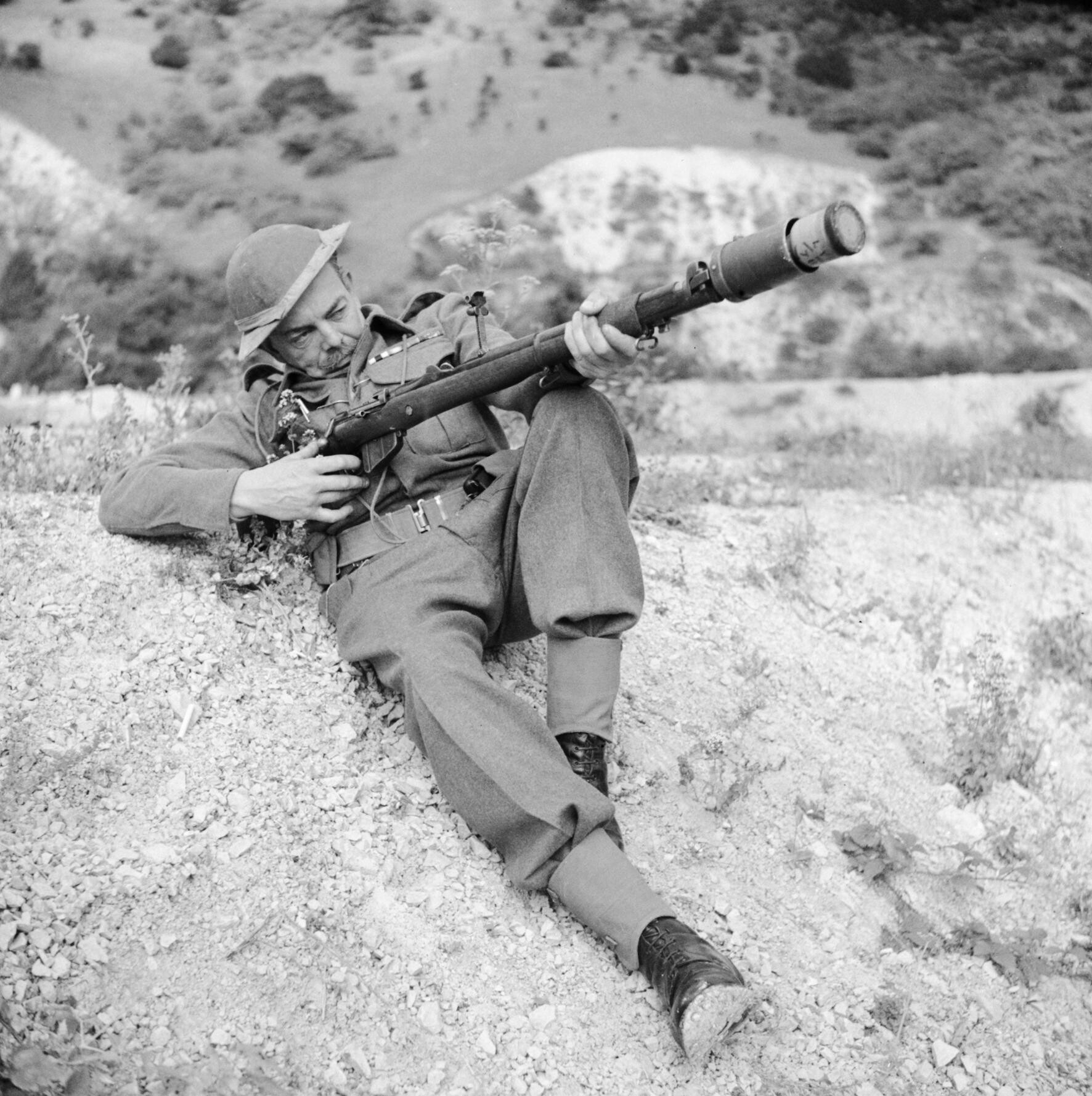
A member of the British Home Guard demonstrates how to aim a rifle equipped to fire a No. 68 anti-tank grenade

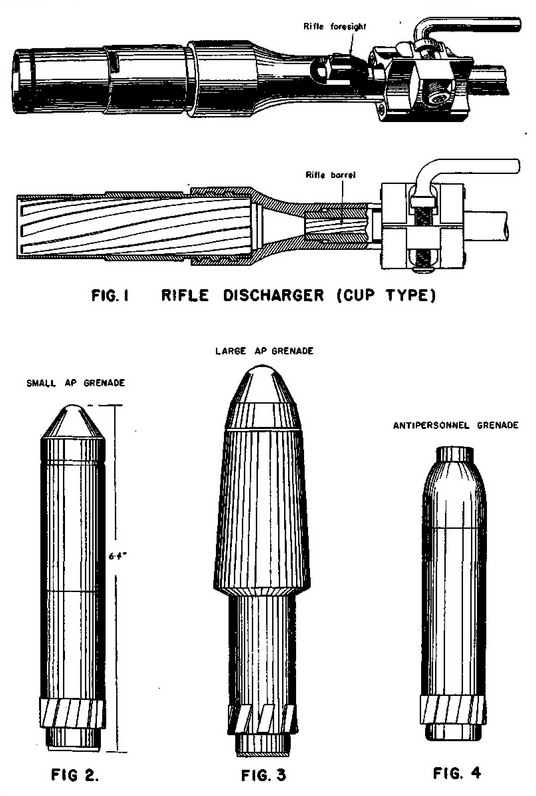
Drawings of German Schiessbecher and grenades

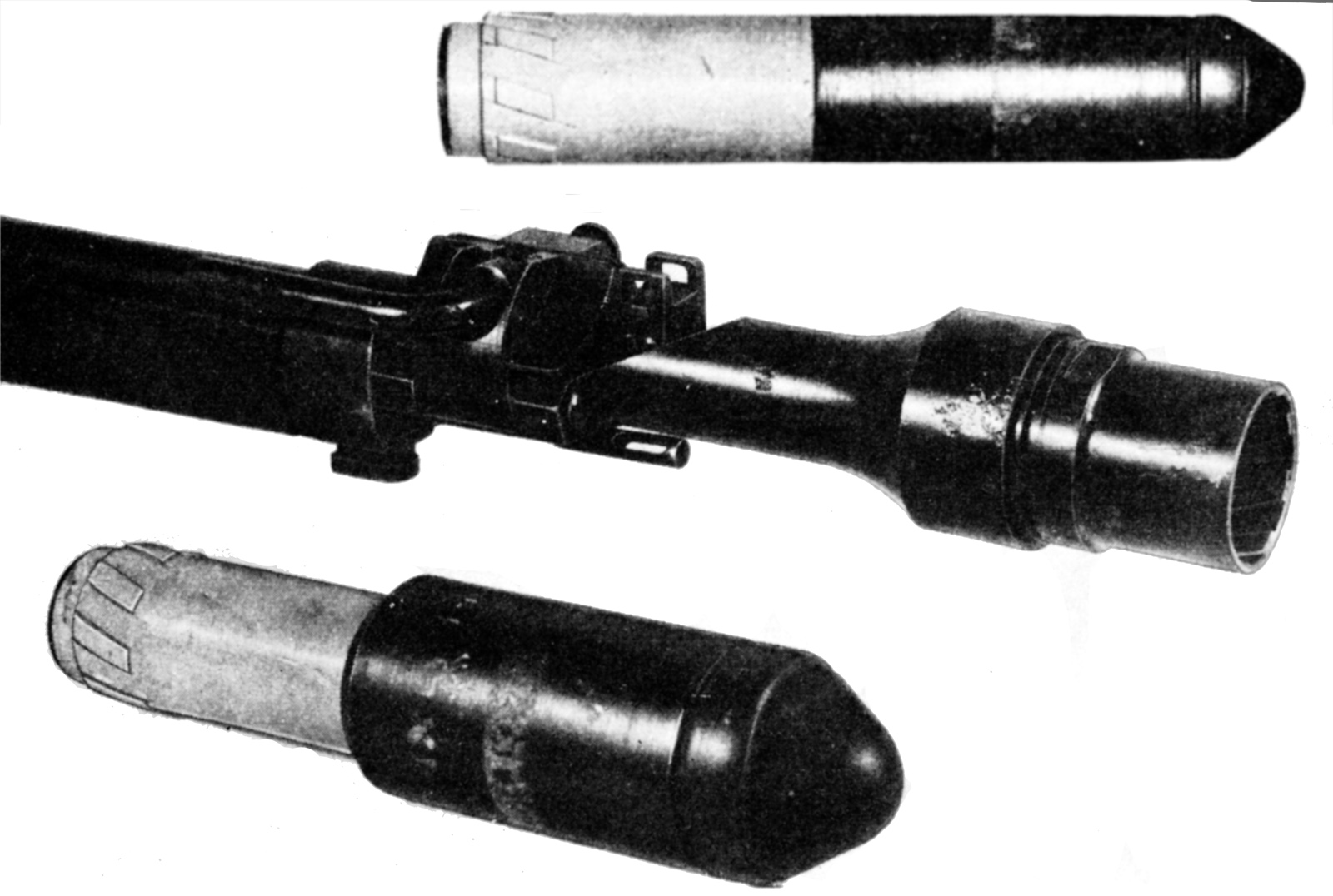
Japanese Type 2 grenade launcher and a 30 mm (1.2 in) Type 2 hollow charge grenade (top) and a 40 mm (1.6 in) Type 2 hollow charge grenade (bottom) used during the Second World War

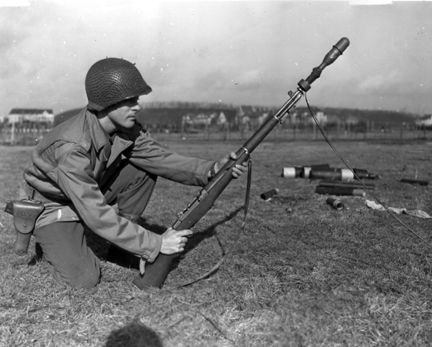
An M7 grenade launcher with M9 rifle grenade fitted on the end of an M1 Garand rifle

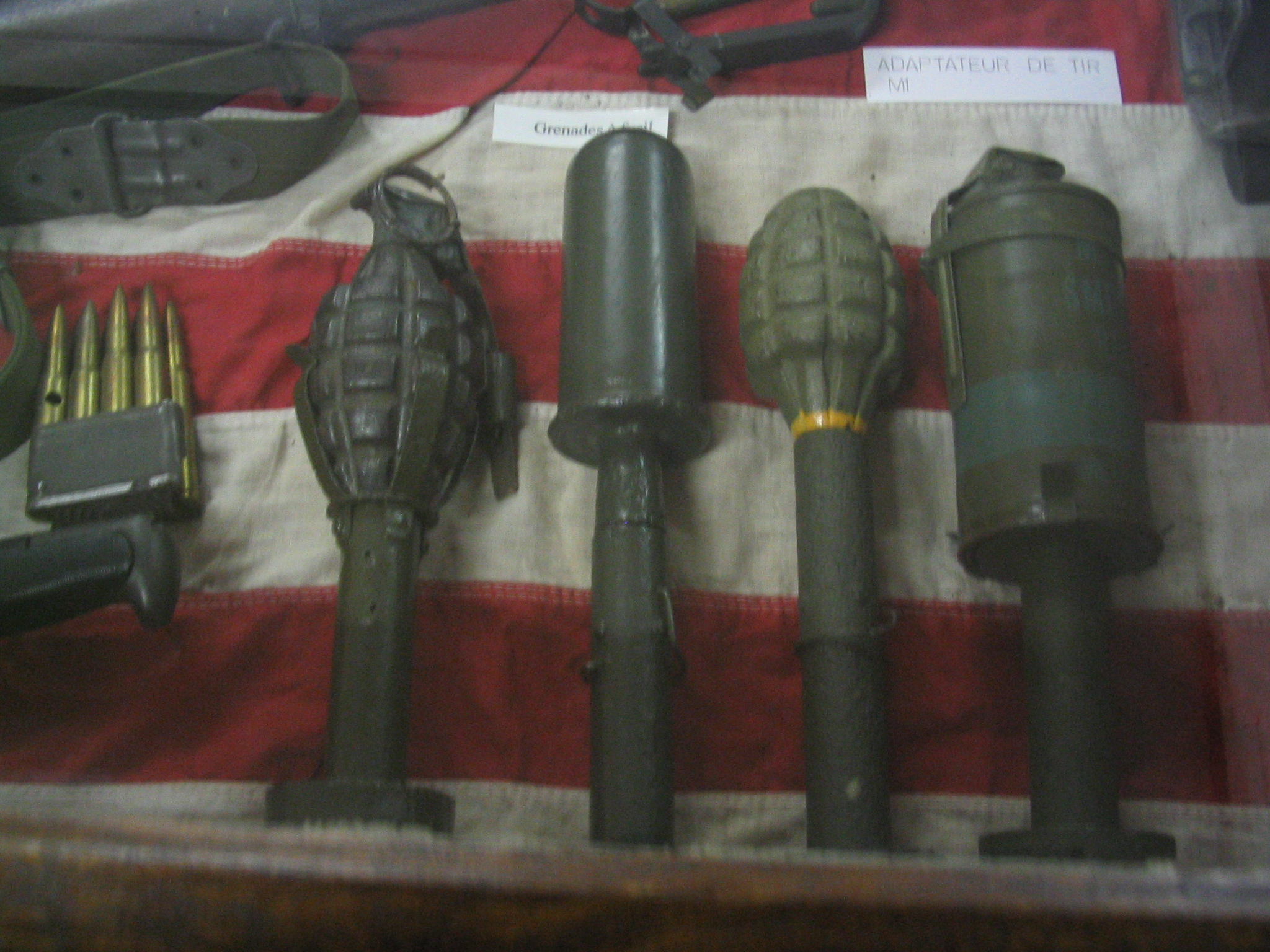
WWII American rifle grenades (From left to right): M1 grenade adapter with Mk.2 fragmentation grenade, M22 smoke rifle grenade with impact fuze, M17 fragmentation rifle grenade with impact fuze, M2 grenade adapter with AN/M8 smoke grenade

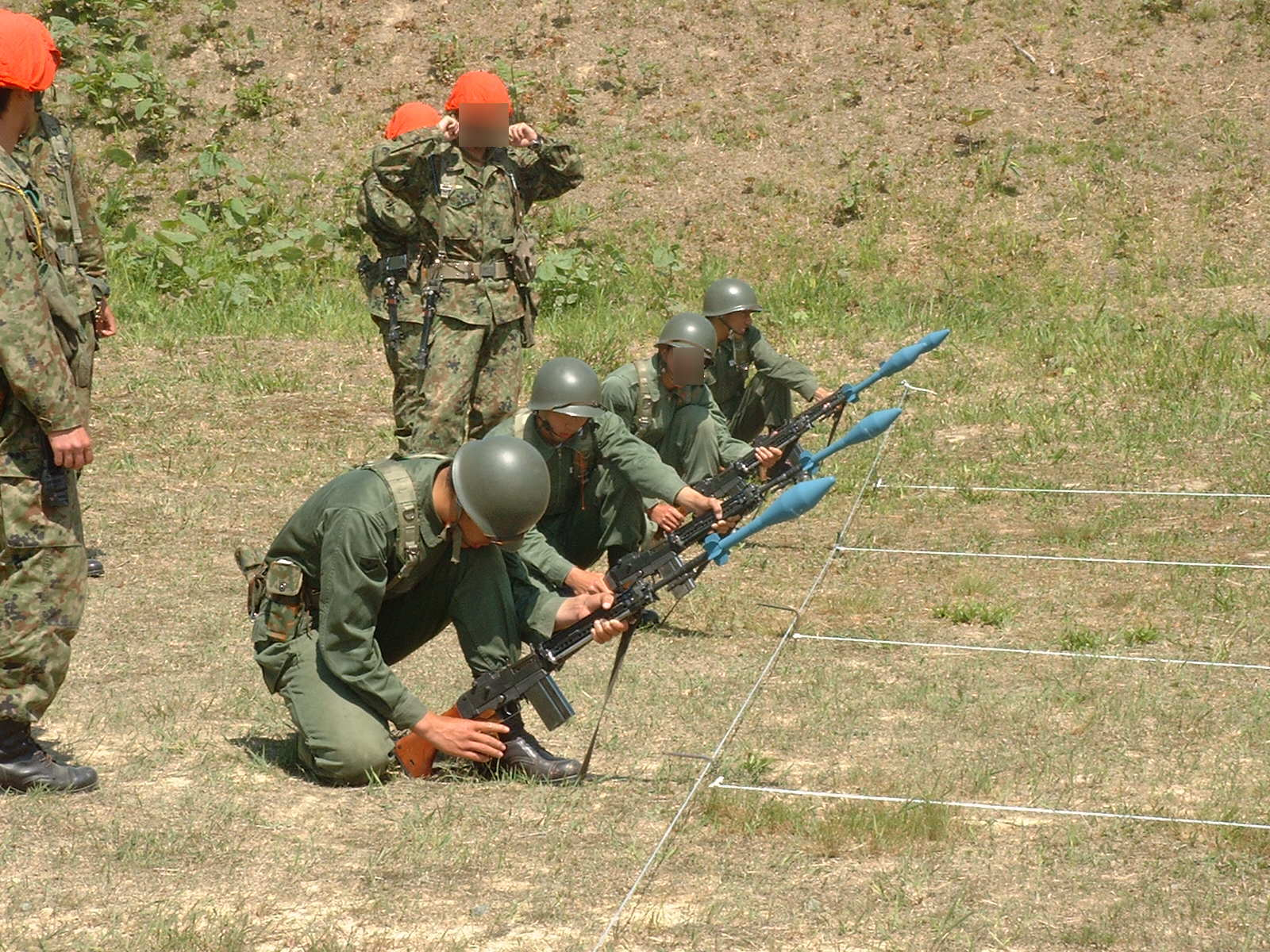
Japanese troops launching practice ENERGA rifle grenades attached from Howa Type 64 rifles

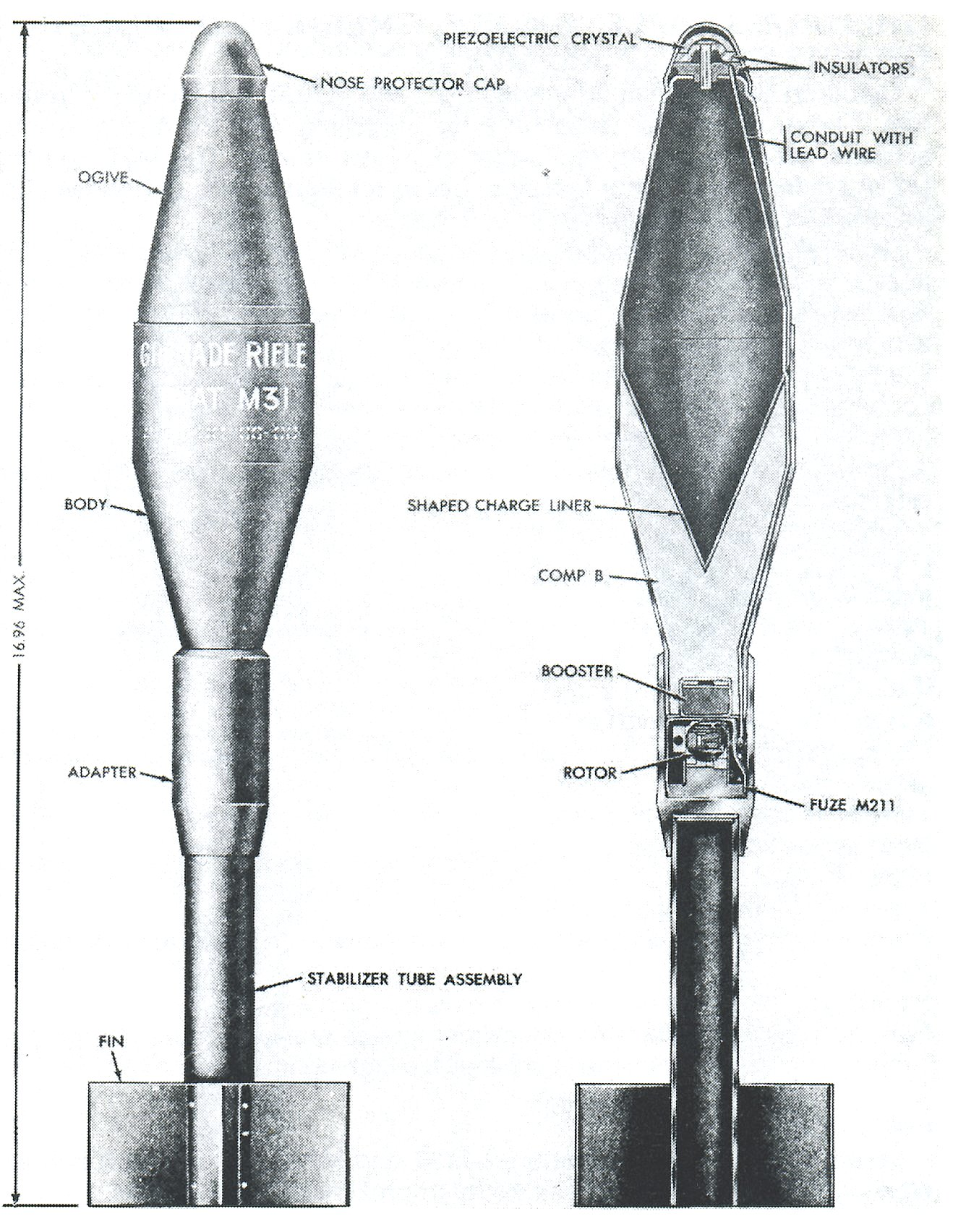
Cutaway of M31 HEAT rifle grenade from US Army Field Manual FM 23-3 1972. The M31 warhead was adapted into the superseding M72 LAW single-shot disposable rocket system.

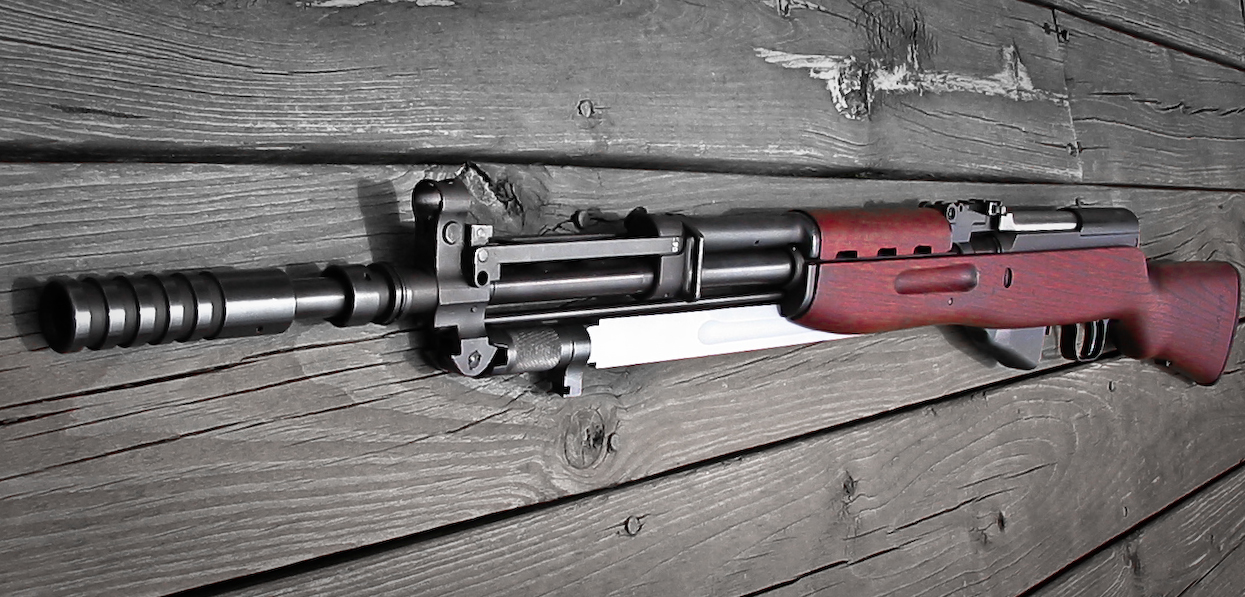
Yugoslavian SKS with 22 mm (0.87 in) launcher attached to muzzle, plus a flip-up grenade sight

Video of U.S. troops using GREM (Simon) rifle grenade system

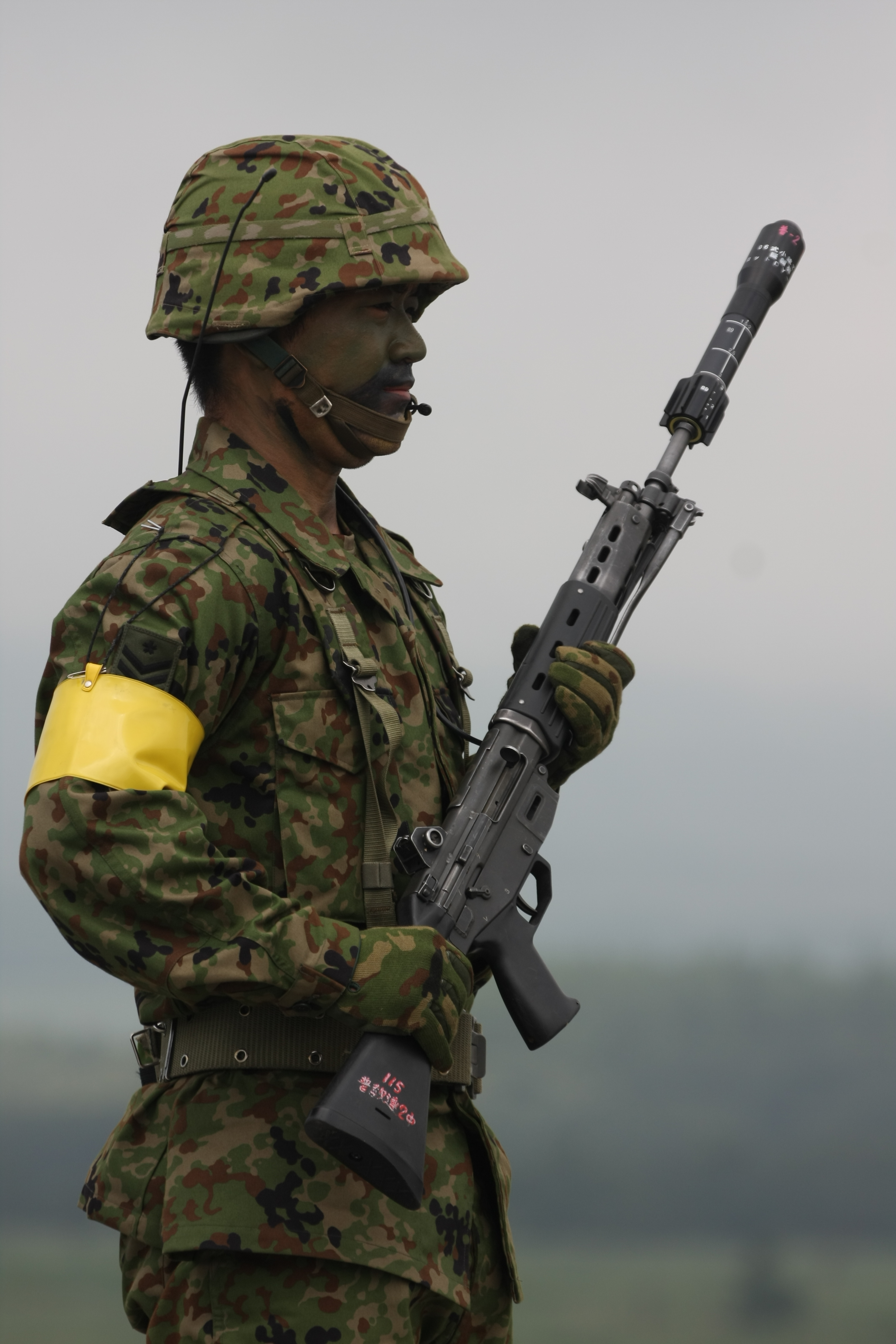
Japanese Type 06 rifle grenade attached to the barrel of a Howa Type 89 assault rifle

The Japanese military continued to experiment with rifle and hand-thrown grenades between the wars and would adopt a family of fragmentation grenades with almost universal adaptability. Introduced in 1931, the Type 91 fragmentation grenade could be thrown by hand, fired from a cup-type grenade launcher (the Type 100), discharged by a lightweight mortar-like projector (the Type 89 grenade discharger, or knee mortar). or fitted with tail-fin assembly and fired from a spigot-type rifle grenade launcher.

The spigot-type grenade launchers were used by Japanese Special Naval Landing Forces to launch an anti-tank (hollow-charge) finned grenade. They were also used to propel Type 91 hand grenades fitted with tail-fin assemblies. These grenades had wood-bulleted launching cartridges stored in their tail-fin assemblies. The cartridges are fired from the rifle and the wooden bullets are trapped by the tail-fin assemblies launching and arming the grenades. These launchers are not numbered, and production figures are not available and examples of spigot grenade launchers are rarely encountered.

In 1939, the Japanese introduced the Type 100 grenade discharger for the Type 38 and Type 99 Arisaka rifles. It launches standard Type 91 and Type 99 hand-grenades. The launcher is somewhat unusual in that rather than using the more common cup designs it is a gas trap system, meaning that it incorporates a barrel extension which taps off excess propellant gases to launch the grenade from a cup offset from the barrel. This has the advantage that standard rifle cartridges could be used along with the standard hand-grenades which simplified logistics, at the expense of increased weight and decreased efficiency. The effective range is approximately 100 yd (91 m).

In 1940, Britain put the first anti-tank grenade into the field during World War II the No. 68 AT grenade, which was one of the first "of any" type anti-tank weapons with a shaped charge or high-explosive anti-tank (HEAT) type warhead. The design of the warhead was simple and could penetrate 52 mm (2.0 in) of armor in 1940. The simple fins gave it some stability in the air and detonation occurred on impact.

In 1942, an attachable rifle grenade launcher called the Gewehrgranatengerät or Schiessbecher ('shooting cup') was introduced that was developed based on rifle grenade launcher models designed during World War I. The 30 mm (1.2 in) Schiessbecher cup-type rifle grenade launcher could be mounted on any Karabiner 98k and was intended to replace all previous rifle grenade launcher models. The rifle grenade launcher could be used against infantry, fortifications and light armored vehicles up to a range of 280 m (306 yd). For these differing tasks, several specialized grenades with accompanying special propelling cartridges were developed for the 1,450,113 produced Schiessbecher rifle grenade launchers. The rifle grenade-propelling cartridges fired a wooden projectile through the barrel to the rifle grenade that, upon impact, automatically primed the rifle grenade. The Schiessbecher could be mounted on the Karabiner 98a, G98/40, StG 44, and FG 42

The Japanese would also adopt a version of the German Schiessbecher grenade launcher. The Type 2 rifle grenade launcher was an attachment for the Type 38 and Type 99 rifles that allowed them to fire special hollow charge grenades. Two grenades were produced for the launcher: a 30 mm (1.2 in) grenade and a larger, 40 mm (1.6 in) grenade, both designated Type 2. The launcher sits over the end of the barrel, held in place with a clamping device. A special crimped blank cartridge or wooden bullet is used to fire the grenades.

In the years just before World War II, the United States adopted the spigot-type 22 mm rifle grenade launchers. These 22 mm (0.87 in) launchers are attached to a rifles muzzle, in the form of a detachable adapter. As with most rifle grenades, it is propelled by a blank cartridge inserted into the chamber of the rifle. A 22 mm (0.87 in) grenade can range from powerful anti-tank rounds such as the M9 rifle grenade, to simple finned tubes with a fragmentation hand grenade attached to the end such as the M1 grenade adapter. The "22 mm (0.87 in)" refers to the diameter of the base tube which fits over the spigot of the launcher, not the diameter of the warhead section, which is much wider.

=== Modern use ===
After World War II, many countries adopted 22 mm (0.87 in) spigot-type launchers and anti-tank rifle grenades with shaped charge or high-explosive anti-tank (HEAT) warheads. The Belgian ENERGA anti-tank rifle grenade design in particular was widely adopted by Western nations. These post-war designs come in "standard" type which are propelled by a blank cartridge inserted into the chamber of the rifle. And, the newer "bullet trap" and "shoot through" types, as their names imply use live ammunition.

The M31 HEAT rifle grenade is a fin-stabilized anti-tank rifle grenade designed in the late 1950s to replace the Belgian ENERGA rifle grenade which was adopted by the US Army and US Marines as an emergency stop-gap measure during the Korean War. Compared to the ENERGA, the M31 is slightly lighter in weight and has a smaller-diameter warhead—i.e. 75 mm (3.0 in) vs 66 mm (2.6 in). Penetration for the M31 is estimated to be 200 mm (7.9 in) for steel armor plating and twice that estimate for concrete.

The bullet-trap rifle grenade became increasing popular in the post-war years, most notably the French AC58 anti-armor and APAV40 multi-purpose grenades. The 22 mm (0.87 in) rifle grenade launchers were further simplified, becoming an integral part of the rifle itself. All current NATO rifles are capable of launching STANAG 22 mm (0.87 in) rifle grenades from their flash hiders without the use of an adapter.

By the late 1960s and early 1970s, rifle grenades and their launchers were slowly replaced by disposable single shot rocket launchers such as the M72 LAW (light anti-tank weapon), and dedicated 40 mm grenade launchers. First seen in the United States armed forces, these 40 mm grenade launchers generally took the form of separate weapons, such as the M79 grenade launcher. Or, as an under-barrel attachment to an assault rifle, such as the M203 grenade launcher attached to an M16 rifle.

Today, there is a return to the concept of the rifle grenade, such as the SIMON breach grenade, the IMI Refaim, FN Herstal Telgren and the Japanese Type 06 advance grenades. These grenades were designed to be used by ordinary riflemen as opposed to specially trained grenadiers. For example, the MECAR rifle grenades are equipped with simple ballistic sights and have an effective range of 300 m (980 ft).

Modern combined arms doctrine dictates that every infantry unit should have a certain percentage of dedicated grenadiers, or soldiers equipped with a grenade launcher or combination rifle/grenade launcher. The criticism of this doctrine is that if the grenadiers in a group are disabled or separated from the group, then the group has completely lost the grenade launcher as a heavy fire support. With the addition of rifle grenades, each soldier would be equipped with a small number of rifle grenades, so every individual soldier could have some form of heavy firepower. However, all of these rifle grenades add additional weight to the soldiers' war-load, and as a consequence they must reduce the amount of rifle ammunition that they carry. For example, a modern French AC58 "bullet trap" rifle grenade weighs 0.5 kg (1.1 lb), the equivalent of a loaded M16 STANAG magazine.

The AK-47 can mount the Kalashnikov cup-type grenade-launcher that uses standard Soviet RGD-5 hand-grenades. The soup-can shaped launcher is screwed onto an AK-47's muzzle. The maximum effective range is approximately 150 m (490 ft). The M16 has a similar device used to launch tear-gas hand-grenades.

On 10 April 2021, during 2021 Myanmar protests, security forces killed at least 82 protesters in Bago town with rifle grenades.

=== Comparison of performance ===
Performance of modern and historical rifle grenades
Name	Introduced	Length	Weight	Explosive fill	Armor penetration (est.)	Maximum range	Effective range
No. 68 AT grenade	1940	178 mm (7.0 in)	894 g (31.5 oz)	156 g (5.5 oz) Lyddite, Pentolite or RDX/Beeswax	52 mm (2.0 in)	? m	100 m (330 ft)
M17 rifle grenade	1941	248 mm (9.8 in)	667 g (23.5 oz)	57 g (2.0 oz) TNT	NA	200 m (660 ft)	? m
M9A1 HEAT anti-tank rifle grenade	1944	285 mm (11.2 in)	590 g (21 oz)	158 g TNT	100 mm (3.9 in)	285 m (935 ft)	100 m (330 ft)
ENERGA anti-tank rifle grenade	1950	395 mm (15.6 in)	645 g (22.8 oz)	331 g (11.7 oz) RDX & TNT	200 mm (7.9 in)	300 m (980 ft)	100 m (330 ft)
Super Energa		425 mm (16.7 in)	765 g (27.0 oz)	314 g (11.1 oz) PETN	275 mm (10.8 in)	550 m (1,800 ft)	200 m (660 ft)
M31 HEAT rifle grenade	1950s	430 mm (17 in)	709 g (25.0 oz)	254 g (9.0 oz) Composition B	200 mm (7.9 in)	185 m (607 ft)	115 m (377 ft)
APAV40	1956	352 mm (13.9 in)	405 g (14.3 oz)	80 g (2.8 oz) hexogen-tolite	100 mm (3.9 in)	320 m (1,050 ft)	170 m (560 ft)
Gewehrgranaten 58	1958		1,180 g (42 oz)		300 to 500 mm (12 to 20 in)	400 m (1,300 ft)	125 m (410 ft)
STRIM 40		315 mm (12.4 in)	515 g (18.2 oz)			150 m (490 ft)	
STRIM 65	1961	420 mm (17 in)	735 g (25.9 oz)	270 g (9.5 oz) of Hexolite		120 m (390 ft)	70 m (230 ft)
BT/AT 52		400 mm (16 in)	510 g (18 oz)				
AC58		380 mm (15 in)	500 g (18 oz)	? g hexogen-tolite	350 mm (14 in)	? m	? m
Denel R1M1	1970s	425 mm (16.7 in)	720 g (25 oz)	? g RDX & Wax	275 mm (10.8 in)	375 m (1,230 ft)	75 m (246 ft)
Rifleman's Assault Weapon	1977	305 mm (12.0 in)	4,700 g (170 oz)	1,000 g (35 oz) high-explosive squash head	200 mm (7.9 in)	1,500 m (4,900 ft)	300 m (980 ft)
Type 06 rifle grenade	2006			High-explosive anti-tank			

== Designs ==
=== Rod-type ===
The rod-type rifle grenade is a standard hand grenade with a metallic rod attached to the base. They were developed before World War I. To use:

1. Insert the rod-type rifle grenade down the barrel of a standard rifle
2. Insert a special blank cartridge into the rifle's chamber
3. Place the rifle's butt-stock on the ground
4. While holding the grenade's safety spoon with one hand, remove the safety pin with the other
5. Place free hand on the rifle's grip and prepare to fire
6. Release the grenade's safety spoon, quickly place said hand on the rifle's fore stock and immediately fire the rifle

If the soldier does not immediately launch the grenade, it will time out and explode. It was later found that the repeated launching of rod grenades caused damage to a rifle's barrel and the rod-type rifle grenade fell from favor.

=== Cup-type ===
The cup-type launcher replaced the rod-type rifle grenade during World War I. This soup-can shaped launcher is attached to a rifle's muzzle. The cup-type launcher could launch a standard hand-grenade or a purpose built cup-type grenade. To use:

1. Insert a grenade into the cup launcher. When using a standard hand-grenade remove the safety pin, the cup holds the safety-spoon in place until launched
2. Insert a special blank cartridge into the rifle's chamber
3. Place the butt-stock of the rifle on the ground and fire from this position

=== "Shoot-through" type ===
The cup-type launcher has the advantage of using standard hand-grenades. However, the need to load a blank cartridge into the rifle's chamber in order to launch the grenade proved to be clumsy in combat. This difficulty lead to the development the French "Vivien and Bessières" shoot-through grenade (or VB grenade). As the name implies, these grenades allow for the use of standard ball ammunition. The VB grenade has a hole through the middle that permits the passage of a standard bullet; this arms the grenade, the expanding gasses launch the grenade, and the grenade explodes 8 seconds later. This removes the need to provide a special blank round to launch the grenade. To use:

1. Insert VB grenade into the cup-type launcher
2. Place the butt-stock of the rifle on the ground and fire from this position

=== Spigot-type ===
The 22mm type rifle grenade launcher was developed before World War II. This type of launcher is attached to a rifle's muzzle and allows for the use of a wide range of rifle grenades, from powerful anti-tank rounds to simple finned tubes with a fragmentation hand-grenade attached to the end. These rifle grenades come in "standard" type, which are propelled by a blank cartridge inserted into the chamber of the rifle; or, "bullet trap" and "shoot through" types, which allow the use of live ammunition. All modern 22mm rifle grenades explode on impact. All Standard issue NATO rifles are capable of launching STANAG type 22mm rifle grenades from their integral flash hiders without the use of an adapter. Modern bullet-trap rifle grenades such as the French APAV40 can be fired as fast as a soldier can place a grenade on an FAMAS rifle's muzzle and pull the trigger. To use:

1. Place 22mm rifle grenade over the spigot attachment or the rifle's flash hider
2. Aim at target and fire rifle

== Other uses and similar devices ==
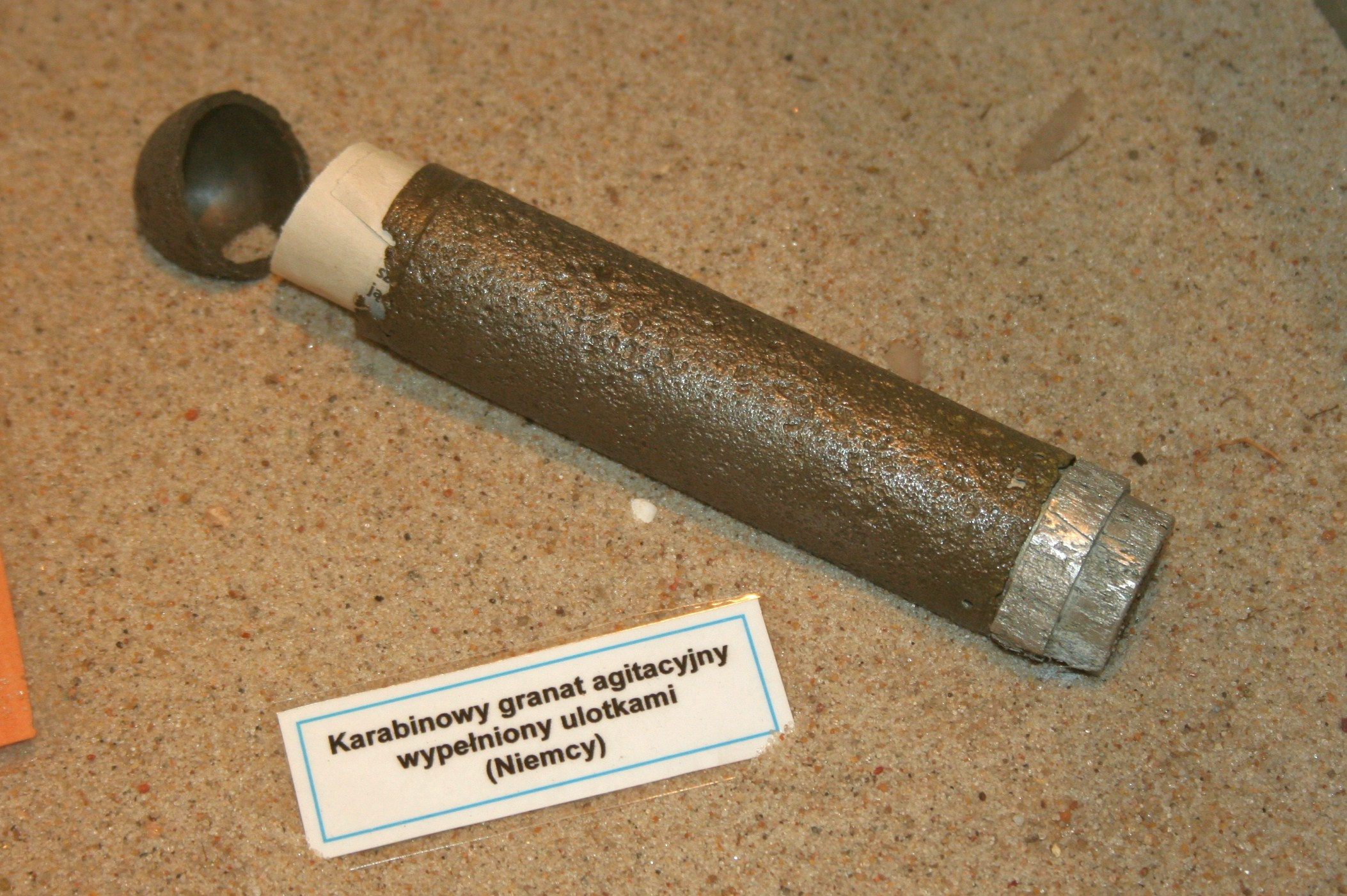
German propaganda rifle grenade

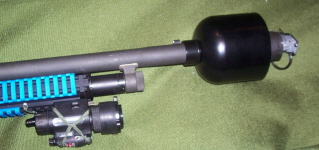
A riot control grenade in a launching cup attached to a Mossberg 500 riot shotgun

Launching a dummy grenade from a Mossberg M500 with a grenade launching cup attachment

During the Second World War, Nazi Germany developed and fielded a propaganda rifle grenade (Propaganda-Gewehrgranate). It was designed for front-line troops to disperse propaganda leaflets via a rifle grenade that would disperse the printed material via a small ejecting charge.

The advent of less lethal grenades for riot control has led to the creation of gun launched versions of these grenades, though they are typically launched by riot shotguns, not rifles. These systems use a cup-type launcher attached to the muzzle of the gun to launch various less lethal grenade types.

A golf ball launcher is a cup-type launcher which is used for sport or recreational purposes. These launchers will shoot a standard golf ball over 250 yards (230 m) with little to no recoil. These launchers are designed to replace an AR-15 type rifle's flash hider.

== Advantages and disadvantages ==
The primary advantage of rifle grenades over a hand grenade is the rifle grenades ability to be launched over much greater distances. A typical rifle grenade can be launched upwards of 100 meters, compared to a regular hand grenade, which can be thrown about 30-40 meters.

Rifle grenades are also more consistent in accuracy, as they do not rely on the form of a human operator the same way a hand thrown grenade does.

Another advantage of rifle grenades is the impact fuze, something that is rarely seen in grenades. While timed fuzes also exist for rifle grenades, impact fuzes are more common. A benefit of the impact fuze is it allows for practical direct fire against vehicles and buildings, even against armored vehicles, in the case of rifle grenades with shaped charge warheads. However, impact fuzes are susceptible to detonation when shaken, thrown or otherwise exposed to shock.

An advantage over a dedicated grenade launcher is the rifle grenades ability to be used with little modification of the rifle it is fired from, requiring either some form of mounting point, or no attachment at all. This would, in theory, allow any soldier with a rifle to become a form of grenadier.

Compared to a rocket launcher, the rifle grenade does not generate backblast, and such is safe to fire within buildings and confined rooms, however rocket launchers have a larger effective range.

== See also ==
- Tromboncino M28, Italian combination carbine and grenade launcher of 1928
- Kbkg wz. 1960
- Dilagrama m/65
- Commando mortar
- Hand mortar
- Mk 2 grenade
- Bazooka
- Rocket-propelled grenade
