= Henry Mohaupt =

Swiss-American inventor

Wolfdieter Hans-Jochem Mohaupt, known as Heinrich Mohaupt, in the U.S. Henry (Hans) Mohaupt (August 16, 1915 – May 20, 2001) was a Swiss American inventor. He first demonstrated and exhibited shaped charge warheads internationally before the Second World War. Prior to 1939, Mohaupt demonstrated his invention to British and French ordnance authorities. Concurrent development by the German group of Cranz, Schardin, and Thomanek led to the first documented use of shaped charges in warfare, in a successful assault on the fort of Eben Emael, on 10 May 1940.

Claims for priority of invention are difficult to resolve due to subsequent historic interpretations, secrecy, espionage, and international commercial interest.

Since the end of the 18th century, it has been known that the geometric shape of an explosive charge plays a decisive role in its explosive effect, and that a hollowed-out explosive device has a particularly high penetrating power. Franz von Baader first described this effect in 1792. Scientific descriptions followed in 1883 by Max von Förster, in 1885 by Gustav Bloem and in 1888 by Charles Edward Munroe. Munroe gave his name to the Munroe effect, on which the shaped charge is based. In 1910, the German scientist Egon Neuman rediscovered the effect and the German explosives company WASAG was the first to patent it. Although the knowledge and technology were available, the shaped charge was not used in First World War (1914-1918). One possible explanation for this is that the military insisted on head detonators, but the shaped charge could only be effective with a bottom detonator. Further scientific publications followed, for example by Alfred Stettbacher, Ernst Richard Escales and Robert Williams Wood. In the period 1935-1938, the lining effect was discovered, which increased the penetration rate. Heinrich Mohaupt claimed to have discovered this in late 1935. Thomanek made this discovery on February 4, 1938 at the Luftfahrtforschungsanstalt in Braunschweig. The discoveries happened by chance and probably independently of each other; a precise investigation of this phenomenon was not yet possible at first. Mohaupt received a patent on November 9, 1939 in France, Thomanek on December 9, 1939 in Germany. However, the date of Mohaupt's discovery is disputed. While Thomanek's events can be well documented, in Mohaupt's case we can only rely on his retrospective reports written in 1966.

== Biography ==
=== Early life and education ===
Heinrich Mohaupt was born on 16 August 1915 in Egg ZH, Switzerland. His parents were Flora Mathilde and Berthold Mohaupt. He had an older sister, Deziré Liselotte. His father Berthold Mohaupt was born in Breslau in Germany but was naturalised with his two children on 30 May 1918. The family changed their place of residence several times during Heinrich's childhood: Egg ZH (until 1915), Cham ZG (1916), Höngg (1917-1920) and finally Zurich.

After secondary school, Mohaupt completed vocational training as an electromechanic in Zurich. He completed his compulsory basic training (recruit school) in the Swiss army in 1935. In 1936 he enrolled in the Matura class at the Minerva Institute in Zurich. In December that year, Mohaupt had to stop attending school due to health and financial problems and took up work as a technical chemist.

=== Shaped charges for military use ===
Mohaupt's interest was in explosives, which he experimented with in his laboratory in Zurich. He applied for his first patent on a manufacturing process for nitroglycerine on 5 August 1935.

In late 1935, Mohaupt observed the effect of the shaped charge with a metallic lining during an explosives test: the shaped charge focuses the explosive energy and deforms the metallic lining into a very fast jet of metal, which penetrates an obstacle. Mohaupt recognised the potential of this discovery, because he made several applications to buy explosives and asked for permission to carry out tests on a larger scale, on the grounds that he wanted to offer his invention to the Swiss army. This may have put him slightly ahead of the Austrian Franz Rudolf Thomanek, who observed this effect on 4 February 1938 at the Aviation Research Institute in Braunschweig and also recognised the potential for military application.

However, the date of Mohaupt's discovery is disputed. While in Thomanek's case the events are well substantiated by official documents, there are only retroactive reports written by Mohaupt himself in 1966. Because of the limited diagnostic means at his disposal, it was initially difficult for Mohaupt to fully understand his discovery. Some of his early designs show arrangements that would interfere with the generation of the metal jet.

At the request of the war technology department of the Swiss army, Mohaupt demonstrated the effect of his invention on 16 September 1938. Since no patent had yet been issued, Mohaupt was not allowed to reveal any details. The Swiss authorities, however, were not interested in Mohaupt's invention, assuming that only rifled projectiles were suitable as anti-tank weapons owing to their high kinetic energy.

At the end of 1937, the United Kingdom learned of Mohaupt's experiments. Two years later, in the spring of 1939, Mohaupt demonstrated his discovery in Zurich before representatives of the British Royal Arsenal. The British suspected the already well-known shaped-charge effect behind the invention, so the licence fee demanded by Mohaupt seemed too high to them. They ended the negotiations, but nevertheless pressed ahead with their own research in the field.

By January 1939, the United States had learned of Mohaupt's attempts through military channels. Negotiations between Mohaupt and US officials commenced in July, but the US was ultimately unwilling to pay the $25,000 licence fee demanded by the Swiss inventor.

Through his father Berthold, also an inventor in the field of munitions, Heinrich Mohaupt had connections to the French weapons engineer and entrepreneur Edgar Brandt. On 26 October 1939, Heinrich left Zurich to follow his father to Paris. After several attempts, the two Mohaupts succeeded, with Brandt's support, in getting the patent filed in France on 9 November 1939 under the number FR919818. In return, Brandt received exclusive rights to market the patent in the country. Further trials and developments took place from October 1939. Demonstrations of the developed rifle grenades took place on 18 February 1940 in Bourges and on 10 June 1940 in Satory near Versailles. After the collapse of the French Army in the German Western campaign and the conclusion of the Compiègne Armistice on 22 June 1940, tests and production preparations were transferred to the unoccupied zone in Pau. The Vichy regime allowed Brandt to share development with the Americans.

Mohaupt was to continue development in the USA, but he first had to wait in Portugal until his entry papers were ready. He finally arrived in the US on 18 October 1940. Shortly after his entry, a demonstration took place at the Aberdeen Proving Ground. Paul Delalande, a French emissary who had arrived a few weeks earlier, was able to organise it in advance. The explosive charges were manufactured by the chemical company DuPont, which was to play an important role in the development and production of shaped charges from then on. After Mohaupt had demonstrated his grenades, the US were ready to secure the rights. When Mohaupt disclosed the principle, the US argued that the shaped charge effect itself was already known. An agreement was then reached on a significantly lower licence fee.

The 30-mm rifle grenade offered by Mohaupt was able to penetrate about 5 cm of armoured steel. On this basis, the Army developed the 60-mm rifle grenade M10 with a penetration capacity of about 10 cm. However, the M10 developed in early 1941 was so heavy, weighing over 700 grams, that it damaged the rifle when fired and endangered the shooter. Coincidentally, a portable rocket launcher was developed by the Army in parallel with the M10. The M10 as a rocket-propelled warhead and the rocket launcher proved to be a groundbreaking combination and became known as the bazooka.

On 4 June 1941, the project was given a high degree of secrecy so that Mohaupt, as a foreigner, was no longer allowed to participate directly in it. Since most of the knowledge transfer had already taken place, this did not have any serious consequences for the project. Nevertheless, Mohaupt continued to work as a consultant for the Army. Independently, he continued to research various configurations of the shaped charge and the insert. Mohaupt patented the improvements he had achieved in 1942. He took US citizenship and served in the US Army from 28 May 1943 to 15 May 1945 under a special contract that allowed him to work for DuPont.

=== Oil and gas industry ===
After the war ended, he briefly returned to Europe and worked for the United States Navy upon his return. In October 1946, Mohaupt became a shareholder in the Well Explosives Company (renamed Welex Jet Services in 1948) and moved from Washington, D.C. to Fort Worth. There he tried to improve the perforation of oil and gas wells using shaped charges. Perforation allows the raw material to be extracted from the well to enter the otherwise sealed well. The process was successful and caught on.

Mohaupt sold his Welex company shares in 1954 and turned his attention to other applications in well stimulation. He was president of Petroleum Tool Research, Inc. and marketed a new process called Vibro-Frac. Servo-Dynamics, a company he founded in 1980, developed processes known as Dynamic Gas Pulse Loading (DGPL) and STRESSFRAC in the field of high-energy gas fracturing.

== Personal life ==
Shortly after the end of the war, Mohaupt married Hazell White. The couple divorced as early as 1946. Between 1947 and 1950 he lived in Fort Worth, Texas, where he married his second wife, Barbara. From 1951 to 1957 he lived in Pasadena and from 1959 onwards in Santa Barbara, where he died on 20 May 2001.
