= 22 mm grenade =

Size of rifle grenade

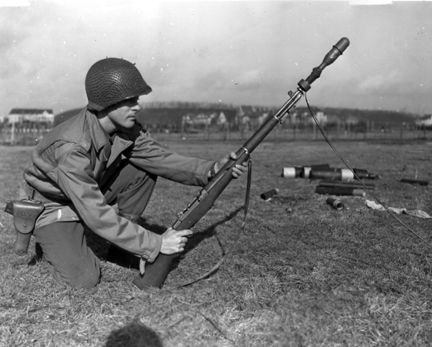
M7 grenade launcher with 22 mm grenade fitted on the end of an M1 Garand rifle.

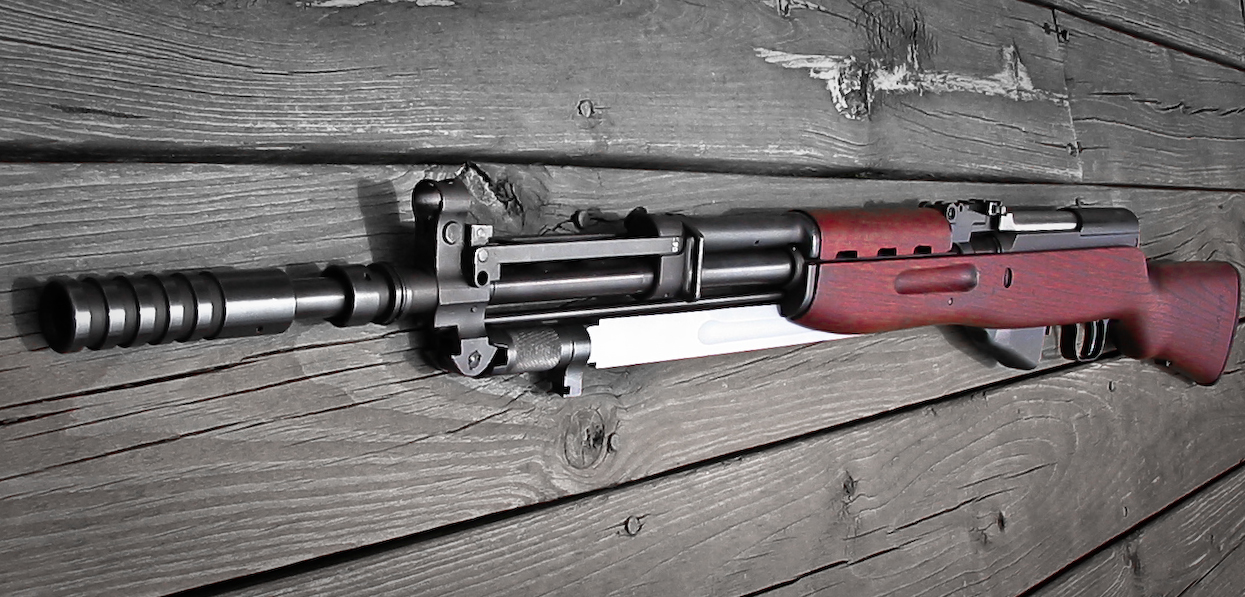
Yugoslavian M59/66 (SKS) with a 22 mm launcher

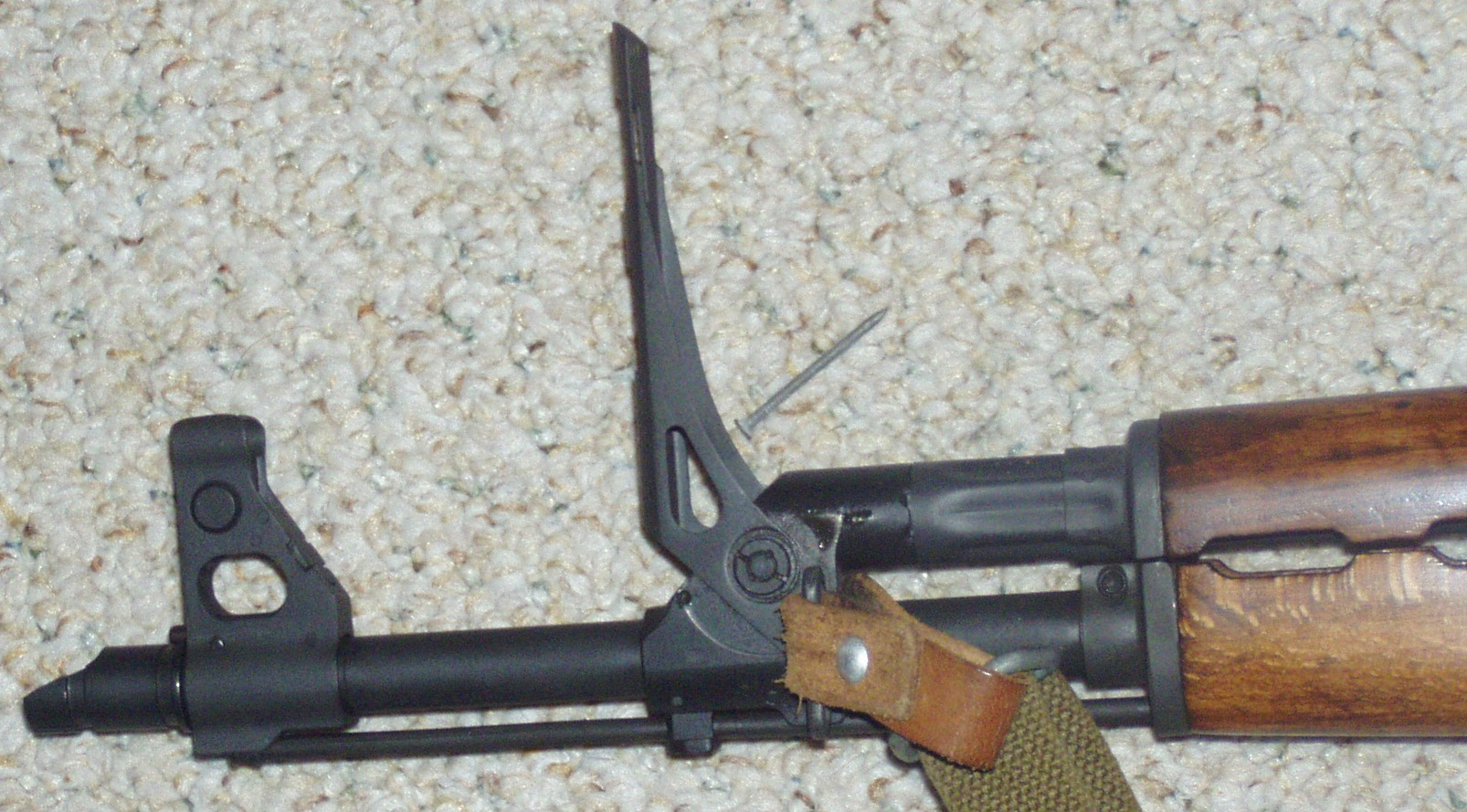
Zastava M70 rifle with grenade sights raised

Video of U.S. troops using GREM (Simon) rifle grenade system

A 22 mm rifle grenade is inserted over the firing mechanism on the front of rifles that are equipped with the appropriate spigot-type launcher, either in the form of an integral flash suppressor or a detachable adapter. As with most rifle grenades, it is propelled by a blank cartridge inserted into the chamber of the rifle. A 22 mm (0.87 in) grenade can range from a powerful anti-tank round to a simple finned tube with a fragmentation hand grenade attached to the end. The "22 mm" refers to the diameter of the base tube which fits over the spigot of the launcher, not the diameter of the warhead section, which is much wider.

This measurement practice differs from conventional launched grenades, such as the US 40 mm grenade, which are measured at their widest point, since they are launched out of gun-like barrels. Thus, a 22 mm rifle grenade can easily be as powerful as a 40 mm grenade, in spite of the seemingly smaller size. A 22 mm grenade is launched on the spigot principle, like a spigot mortar; a tube slightly under 22 mm is attached to the end of a rifle barrel to serve as the spigot, and left open on the muzzle end so bullets can be fired through it. The grenade consists of a heavy warhead section of 30–75 mm (1.2–3.0 in) in diameter for the nose, and a lightweight hollow tube for the tail section. The inner diameter of this tube is 22 mm, and fits over the tube attachment on the muzzle with only a small amount of play, to create a good gas seal and promote accuracy. There are typically a series of rings machined around the perimeter of the tube, which serve as baffles to slow any escaping high-pressure gases created on launch until the grenade is clear of the launcher, and sometimes a metal o-ring to create a final seal and to lock the grenade in place until pressure has risen high enough.

== Usage ==
To fire the grenade, firstly a special blank cartridge is loaded into the weapon. There is often some sort of cutoff device on gas operated rifles that can be engaged to disable the gas piston, both to eliminate the possibility of a live round chambering itself, and to prevent any of the gas being tapped off, which might affect the accuracy and range of the grenade.

The tail of the grenade is slipped over the muzzle attachment, where it indexes itself so the aiming mark is on the top. The rifle is lined up with the target, butt to the ground, and held to the proper angle to ensure the correct ballistic trajectory, a skill which must be learned in training. This can be done by eye, but some rifles, such as the Yugoslavian M59/66 (SKS) and Zastava M70, have built in flip-up ladder sights that allow for accurate ranging of the shots, by giving a graduated series of "rungs" which correspond with various ranges. The rifle is aligned with the target, and the user looks through the ladder sight, adjusting the angle until the sighting mark on the tip of the grenade matches the proper range on the sight.

The trigger is then pulled and the high-velocity gases rush down the barrel. The gas is slowed by the obstructing grenade, and the low-pressure, high-velocity gas transforms into low-velocity, high-pressure gas very rapidly, which forces the grenade off the launcher at a relatively high speed, whereupon it follows a ballistic arc to the target.

A rifle grenade cannot be easily or safely fired directly at a target, and is always used for indirect fire; the closer the target, the higher the angle the rifle is held, much like a mortar.

== Adoption ==
The first rifles to utilize the 22 mm grenade were the American M1903 Springfield, M1 Garand and M1 carbine, all of which required an adapter (the M1, M7, and M8 grenade launchers, respectively). After the formation of NATO, the 22 mm grenade was adopted as its standard rifle grenade. The French have been producing 22 mm grenades fired with 7.62×51mm NATO rounds since 1956. Many NATO small arms, such as the West German Heckler & Koch G3, French MAS-36/51, MAS-49/56 and FAMAS, British SA80, and American M16/M4 are equipped to launch 22 mm grenades without an adapter. The same 22 mm thread diameter for these rifles has also been referred to as a "STANAG muzzle device" size for flash hiders and other attachments by civilian firearm traders.

Two non-NATO members, Yugoslavia and Spain, adopted locally-manufactured rifles, such as the Yugoslavian SKS, M70 and Spanish CETME (which predated Spain's entry into NATO) are also compatible for launching 22 mm rifle grenades. Consequentially, their armed forces would use M60 rifle grenades and Instalaza rifle grenades respectively. Israel and Norway both employed Belgian-made Mecar 22 mm adapters for the Mauser K98k rifle. Mecar was also the manufacturer of the Energa rifle grenades used with this launcher. The Austrian Steyr AUG also supports firing 22 mm grenades.
