= Energa anti-tank rifle grenade =

Antitank rifle grenade

Energa rifle grenade
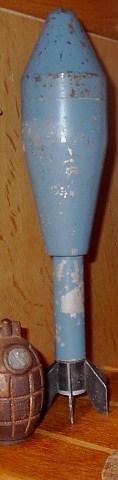
- ENERGA rifle grenade. The blue paint signifies an inert training version
- Type: Antitank Rifle Grenade
- Place of origin: Liechtenstein, first manufactured in Belgium

Service history
- Wars: Korean War; Portuguese Colonial War; Rhodesian Bush War; South African Border War; Bangladesh Liberation War; Lebanese Civil War

Production history
- Designer: Edgar Brandt
- Manufacturer: Mecar SA

Specifications (HEAT-RFL-75)
- Mass: 765 g (27.0 oz)
- Length: 425 mm (16.7 in)
- Diameter: 75 mm (3.0 in)
- Muzzle velocity: 75 m/s (250 ft/s)
- Maximum firing range: 550 m (1,800 ft) (maximum); 200 m (660 ft) (effective)
- Filling: PETN
- Filling weight: 314 g (11.1 oz)

The Energa anti-tank rifle grenade is a rifle-launched anti-tank grenade that is propelled by a ballistite-filled blank cartridge. The name Energa comes from the firm in Liechtenstein that designed it, the Anstalt für die ENtwicklung von ERfindungen und Gewerblichen Anwendungen, based in Vaduz.

First produced in the 1950s, by Mecar in Belgium, it was in front-line use by European armies until replaced by disposable tube-launched anti-tank rockets such as the M72 LAW. Although no longer in production, stocks of the grenade still exist and the Energa grenade remains in service with Third World countries. Armscor of South Africa manufactured the R1M1, an improved version of the Energa grenade.

The original Energa grenade could penetrate 200 mm (7.8 inches) of armor or 500 mm (19.6 inches) of concrete at an angle of impact of 90 degrees. At an angle of impact of 45 degrees, the figures dropped to 100 mm (3.9 inches) and 250 mm (9.8 inches), respectively.

The Super Energa used a rocket booster to extend the grenade's range to 550 m (1,800 ft). The Super Energa could penetrate up to 275 mm (10.8 inches) of armor and 600 mm (23.6 inches) of concrete.

== U.S. service ==
Early in the Korean War, U.S. forces found their World War II-era anti-tank rifle grenades were ineffective against the frontal armor of T-34 tanks. This led the U.S. to produce their own version of the Energa, the M28 rifle grenade, from 1950 until 1960. Originally the M28 was fired from Mecar's proprietary T119 (M1 Garand) and T120 (M1 carbine) launchers. The T119 was soon replaced by the improved M7A3 launcher (M1 Garand) from September 1952 onwards. The M28 was eventually replaced in US military service by the M31 HEAT rifle grenade and later by the M72 LAW rocket. The M29 TP (training practice) round remained in service until it was replaced in 1961 by the improved M31 TP.

== UK service ==
The Energa was introduced to infantry units of the British Army of the Rhine from 1952 when it replaced the PIAT. It was issued one per person within the infantry platoon and attached to the waist belt. In British service, the Energa was known as the Anti-Tank Grenade, No. 94. It was designed to be fired from the Projector (No. 4 rifle) Mark 5' (c.1952), an attachment for the Lee–Enfield No.4 rifle. The later L1A1 Self-Loading Rifle could also fire the Energa, but it was not commonly done. It was made obsolete by the adoption of the 84 mm L14A1 medium anti-tank weapon (MAW) and the 66 mm M72 light anti-tank weapon (LAW).

== South African service ==
The South African 75mm R1M1 version was used during the South African involvement in Angola in the 1970s and 1980s. It was launched from the standard Vektor R1 (South African version of the FN FAL) rifles.

== Bangladeshi service ==
Bangladeshi Mukti Bahini members used Energa grenades during the Bangladesh Liberation War.

== Netherlands service ==
The Netherlands produced three versions of the Energa: the NR4 was a live grenade, the NR5 was an inert practice grenade, and the NR18 was a practice grenade with white chalk in a plastic nosecone that shattered on impact and left a strike mark on the target.

== Belgian service ==
The Energa saw service with the ABL. It could be fired from both the FN FAL and also from the FN Model 1949 (SAFN). The Belgians also produced an inert training grenade, the AT GR PRAC 75 mm.

== Portuguese service ==
The Portuguese Army adopted the Energa as their Granada anti-tanque super Energa mod.2 m/953, which was used during the Portuguese Colonial War in the 1960s and 1970s. It was launched from standard FN FAL and Heckler & Koch G3 rifles.

== Rhodesian service ==
The Rhodesian Security Forces used both the Energa and its South African 75mm R1M1 version during the Rhodesian Bush War in the 1960s and 1970s. It was launched from standard FN FAL and Heckler & Koch G3 rifles.

== Lebanese service ==
The Lebanese Armed Forces and several Lebanese militias used the Energa during the Lebanese Civil War between 1975 and 1990. It was launched from FN FAL, M16 and Heckler & Koch G3 rifles.

== Performance of variants ==
Variant	Length	Weight	Explosive fill	Armor penetration (est.)	Maximum range	Effective range
Energa	395 mm (15.6 in)	645 g (22.8 oz)	331 g (11.7 oz) RDX & TNT	200 mm (7.9 in)	300 m (330 yd)	100 m (110 yd)
NR4	395 mm (15.6 in)	645 g (22.8 oz)	331 g (11.7 oz) RDX & TNT	200 mm (7.9 in)	300 m (330 yd)	100 m (110 yd)
Super Energa	425 mm (16.7 in)	765 g (27.0 oz)	314 g (11.1 oz) PETN	275 mm (10.8 in)	550 m (600 yd)	200 m (220 yd)
Denel R1M1	about 425 mm (16.7 in)	720 g (25 oz)	RDX & wax	275 mm (10.8 in)	375 m (410 yd)	75 m (82 yd)

External image
- Super ENERGA Cut-Away
- Cutaway drawing shows rocket-assist and unique safety flash-barrier design in the base that prevents detonation even if dropped on nose

== Users ==
- Bangladesh
- Belgium
- Italy
- India
- Lebanon
- Netherlands
- Portugal
- Rhodesia
- South Africa
- United Kingdom
- United States

== See also ==
- List of weapons of the Portuguese Colonial War
- List of weapons of the Lebanese Civil War
- List of weapons of the Rhodesian Bush War
- List of Korean War weapons

== Bibliography ==
- Peter Abbott, Manuel Ribeiro Rodrigues and Ron Volstad, Modern African Wars (2): Angola and Mozambique 1961–74, Men-at-Arms series 202, Osprey Publishing Ltd, Oxford 1988. ISBN 978-0-85045-843-5

=== Further reading ===
- Ian V. Hogg, Jane's Infantry Weapons 1984-85, Jane's Publishing Company Ltd., London 1984. ISBN 978-0710607966
