= M31 HEAT rifle grenade =

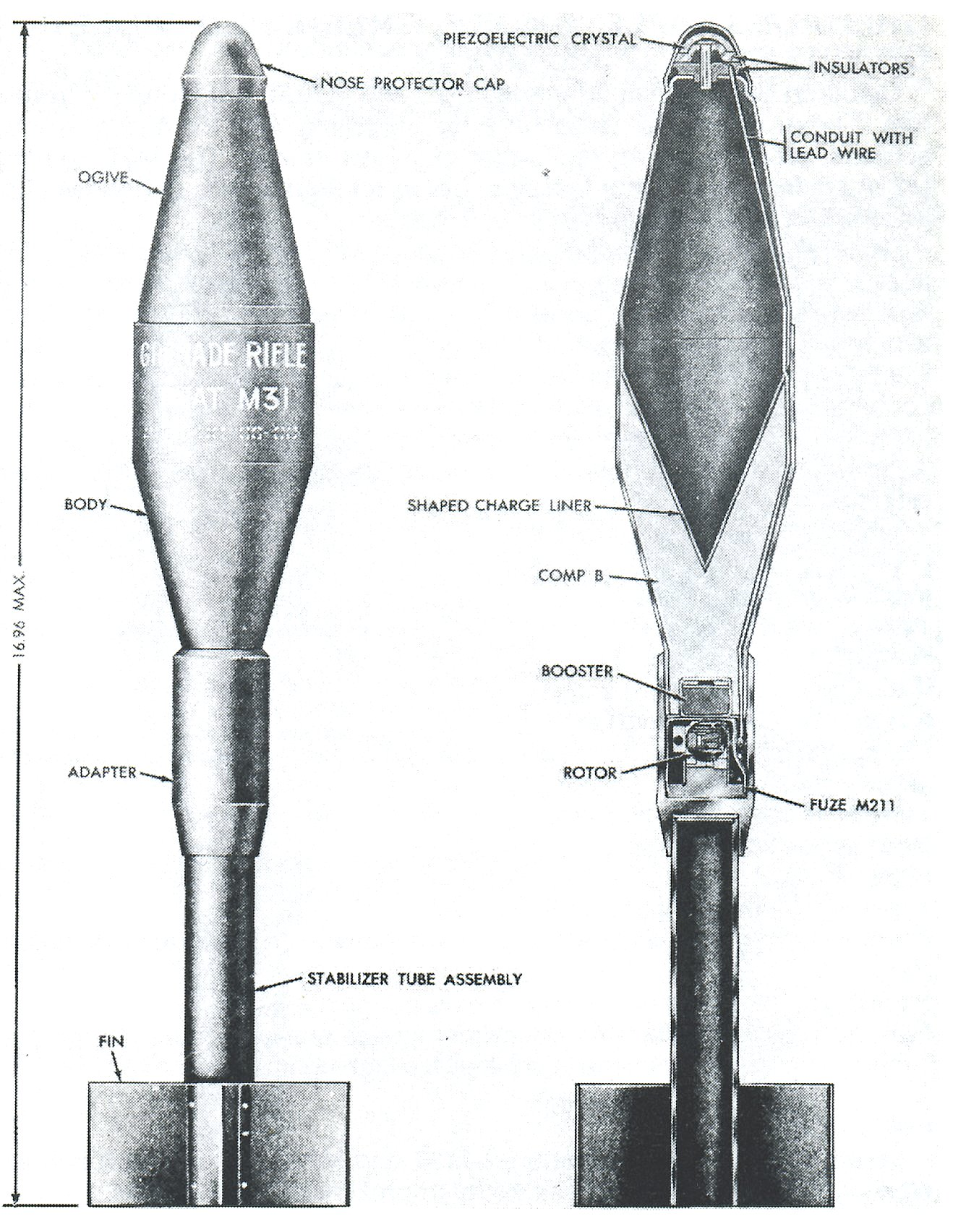
- Cutaway of M31 HEAT rifle grenade
- Type: Anti-armor rifle grenade
- Place of origin: United States

Service history
- Wars: Cold War

Production history
- Designed: late 1950s
- Produced: 1950s–1970s

Specifications
- Mass: 709 g (25.0 oz)
- Length: 430 mm (17 in)
- Diameter: 66 mm (2.6 in) warhead
- Effective firing range: 115 m (126 yd)
- Maximum firing range: 185 m (202 yd)
- Filling: Composition B
- Filling weight: 294 g (10.4 oz)
- Detonation mechanism: Nose-initiated, base-detonated

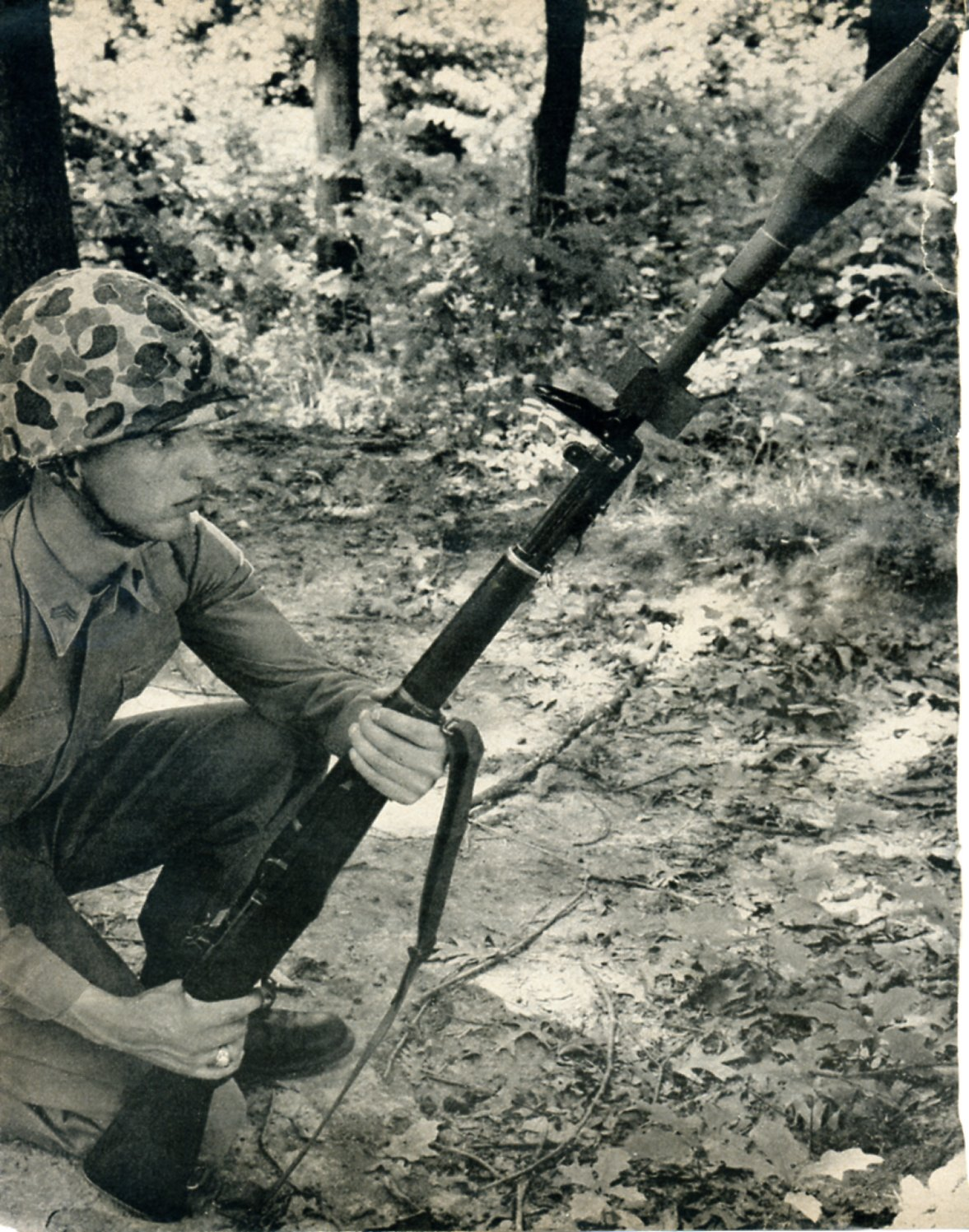
A marine preparing to fire an M31 from an M1 rifle

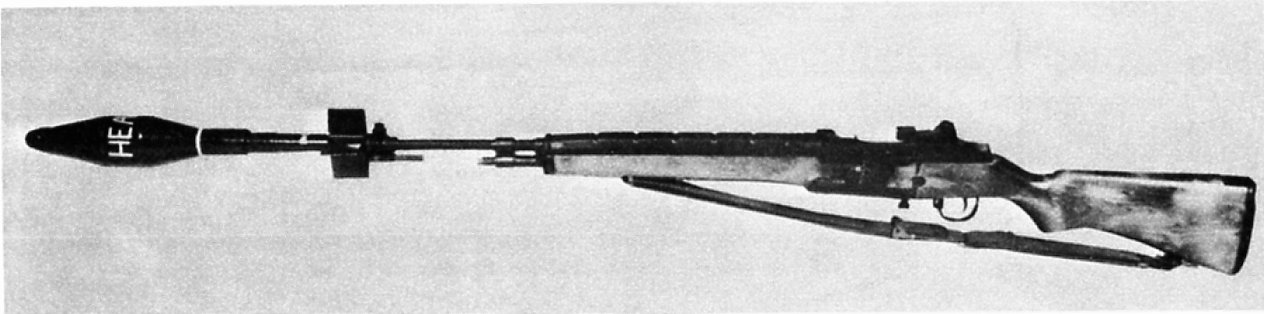
An M31 HEAT rifle grenade fitted to an M14 rifle

The M31 HEAT is a fin-stabilized anti-tank rifle grenade designed in the late 1950s to replace the Belgian ENERGA rifle grenade which was adopted by the US Army and US Marines as an emergency stop-gap measure during the Korean War. Like the ENERGA, it has a nose-initiated, based-detonated HEAT warhead, but unlike the ENERGA, the mechanical impact fuse system is replaced with a less complex and more reliable piezo-electric fuse system which also allows higher angles of impact, up to 65 degrees.

== History ==
The M31 was originally designed to be fired only from the M1 Garand, but could also be fired from both the M14 and M16 rifles. To launch the M31, a detachable spigot-type grenade launcher (M7A3 launcher for M1 rifle, and M76 launcher for the M14 rifle) is fitted to the muzzle of the rifle. A M3 ballistic cartridge (two are supplied in the packing container with each grenade and are crimped to indicate the cartridges are only for launching rifle grenades) is loaded into the rifle's chamber. The hollow tail unit of the rifle grenade is fitted over the grenade launcher.

Official military manuals recommend that the M31 HEAT be fired from either the standing or kneeling position and that it is only accurate against armored vehicles if fired at extremely close ranges. While claimed to be effective against main battle tanks (except in frontal engagements) and lightly armored vehicles when first introduced, in 1972 the US Army stated in its revised anti-armor warfare manual that the M31 HEAT was only effective against light tanks and thin-skinned vehicles.

== Design ==
On impact, the nose cover collapses, crushing a crystal-like material, which sends an electric current through a separate wire to the warhead's detonator, located in the base of the warhead. A mechanical safety, comprising a set back system located in the warhead's base, grounds the firing circuit and prevents the accidental explosion of the warhead. On firing, the sudden launch acceleration causes the set-back's three disks to rotate 90 degrees, each in succession to the other, with the rotation of the third disk removing the grounding after approximately 10 meters of flight and completing a firing circuit for the current to flow from the nose to the detonator in the base. Compared to the ENERGA, the M31 is slightly lighter in weight and has a smaller-diameter warhead—i.e. 75 mm (3.0 in) vs 66 mm (2.6 in). Penetration for the M31 is estimated to be 200 mm / 8 inches for steel armor plating and twice that estimate for concrete. The warhead technology developed for the M31 was used for the future M72 LAW antitank rocket.

=== Status ===
Various US military manuals issued in 1972 still had sections on the M31, but by the end of the Vietnam War, both the US Army and US Marines had essentially phased out muzzle-launched rifle grenades, in favor of the M72 LAW disposable rocket in the anti-armor role and the M203 under-barrel grenade launcher in the squad fire-support role.

In the 1977 revision of US military anti-armor warfare manuals, the M31 HEAT was no longer listed.
The 2001 U.S. Army TM 43-0001-29 C2, "Data Sheets for Grenades" details the Grenade, Rifle, HEAT M31 on pages 3-3 and 3-4 with DODIC ordering codes.

== Users ==
- Japan
- Philippines
- United States

== References and notes ==
- FM 23-3 Tactics, Techniques and Concept of Antiarmor Warfare, published US Army August 1972
- Jane's Infantry Weapon's System 1976, page 452, Watts Publishing ISBN 0-531-03255-8
- US Rifle Grenades, WW2 And After - inert-ord.net
