= Pentolite =

High power explosive

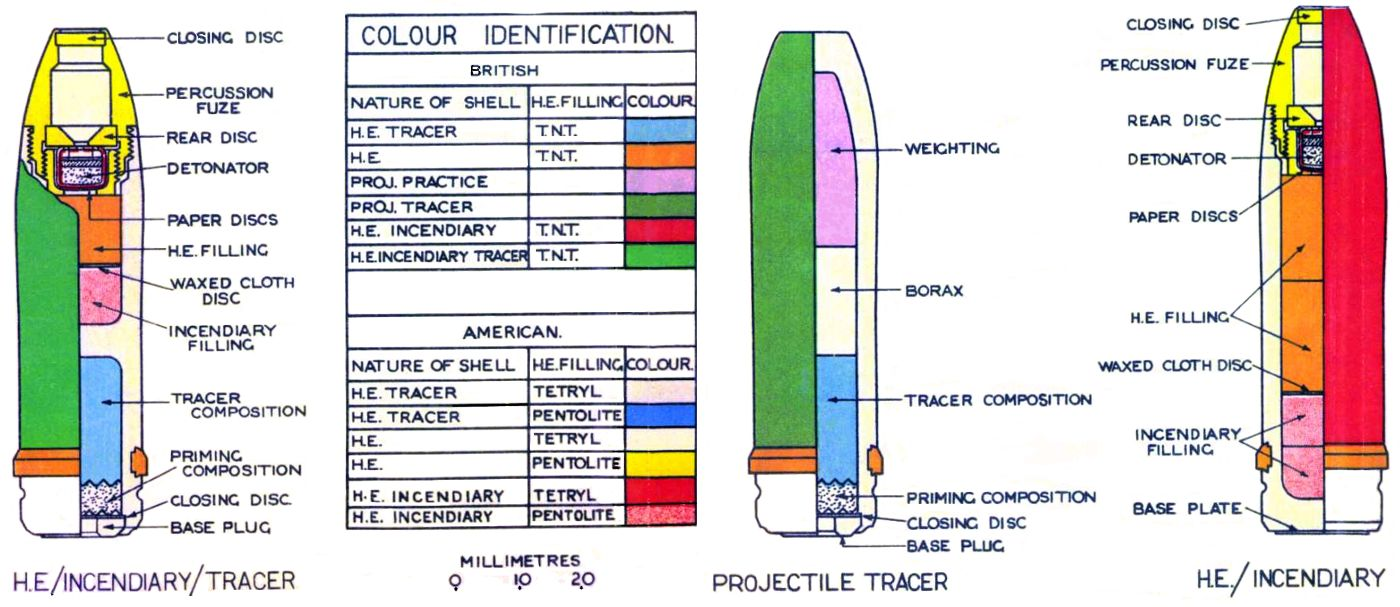
Cross-sectional view of Oerlikon 20 mm cannon shells (dating from circa 1945) showing color code for pentolite filling

Pentolite is a composite high explosive used for military and civilian purposes, e.g., warheads and booster charges. It is made of pentaerythritol tetranitrate (PETN) phlegmatized with trinitrotoluene (TNT) by melt casting.

The most common military variety of pentolite (designated "Pentolite 50/50") is a mixture of 50% PETN and 50% TNT. (Unlike other compound explosives, the number before the slash is the mass percentage of TNT and the second number is the mass percentage of PETN.) This 50:50 mixture has a density of 1.65 g/cm^{3} and a detonation velocity of 7400 m/s.

Pentolite is a common explosive for cast boosters for the blasting work (as in mining). Civilian pentolite may contain a lower percentage of PETN, e. g. around 2% ("Pentolite 98/2"), 5% ("Pentolite 95/5") or 10% ("Pentolite 90/10"). These civilian pentolites have a detonation velocity of about 7,800 metres per second.
