= Mecar =

Belgian arms company

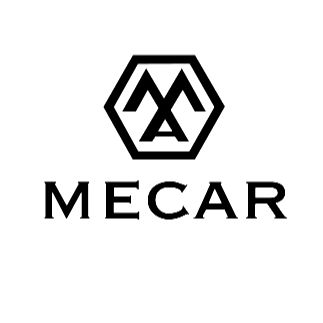
Logo of Mecar

Mecar is a Belgian weapon and ammunition manufacturing company headquartered in Petit-Roeulx-lez-Nivelles, Hainaut Province.

== History ==
The company was established in 1938.

Following its acquisition in May 2014, Mecar is now a wholly owned subsidiary of NEXTER Systems S.A., a French manufacturer of defense systems.

Mecar was renamed KNDS Belgium in 2015.

== Products ==
Mecar manufactures weapons ranging from grenades to lightweight anti-tank cannons. It now produces arms for NATO, Belgium, and other countries.

== See also ==
- Mecar M72
