= List of weapons of the Vietnam War =

Weapons used in the Vietnam war

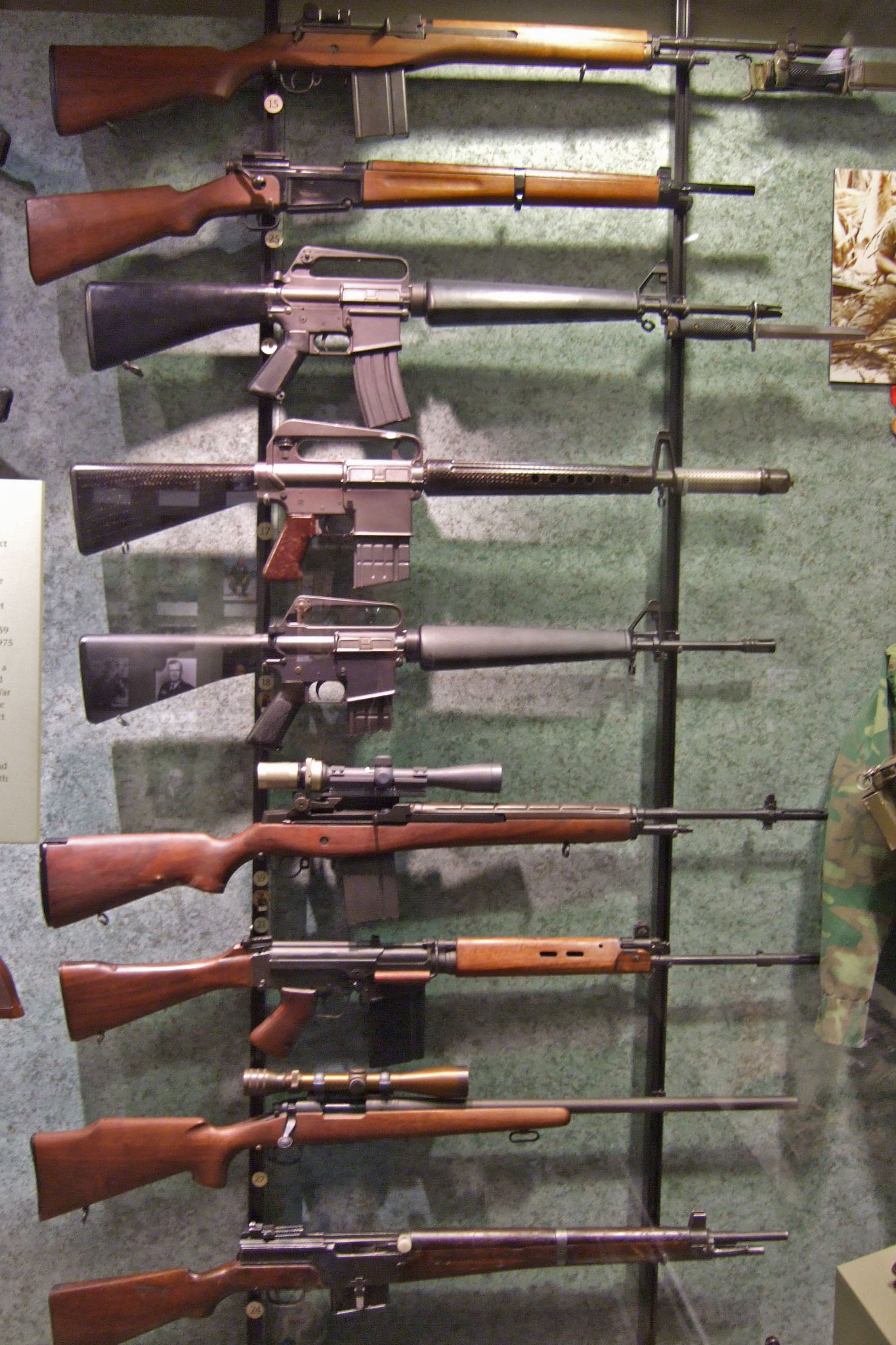
Vietnam-era rifles used by the US military and allies. From top to bottom: M14, MAS 36, M16 (30 round magazine), AR-10, M16 (20 round magazine), M21, L1A1, M40, MAS 49

The Vietnam War involved the People's Army of Vietnam (PAVN) or North Vietnamese Army (NVA), National Liberation Front for South Vietnam (NLF) or Viet Cong (VC), and the armed forces of the People's Liberation Army (PLA), Soviet Armed Forces, Korean People's Army, Army of the Republic of Vietnam (ARVN), United States Armed Forces, Republic of Korea Armed Forces, Royal Thai Armed Forces, Australian Defence Force, and New Zealand Defence Force, with a variety of irregular troops.

Nearly all United States-allied forces were armed with U.S. weapons including the M1 Garand, M1 carbine, M14 rifle, and M16 rifle. The Australian and New Zealand forces employed the 7.62 mm L1A1 Self-Loading Rifle as their service rifle, with the occasional use of the M16 rifle.

The PAVN, although having inherited a variety of American, French, and Japanese weapons from World War II and the First Indochina War (aka French Indochina War), were largely armed and supplied by the People's Republic of China, the Soviet Union, and its Warsaw Pact allies. Further, some weapons—notably anti-personnel explosives, the K-50M (a PPSh-41 copy), and "home-made" versions of the RPG-2—were manufactured in North Vietnam. By 1969 the US Army had identified 40 rifle/carbine types, 22 machine gun types, 17 types of mortar, 20 recoilless rifle or rocket launcher types, nine types of antitank weapons, and 14 anti-aircraft artillery weapons used by ground troops on all sides. Also in use, mostly by anti-communist forces, were the 24 types of armored vehicles and self-propelled artillery, and 26 types of field artillery and rocket launchers.

== Communist forces and weapons ==
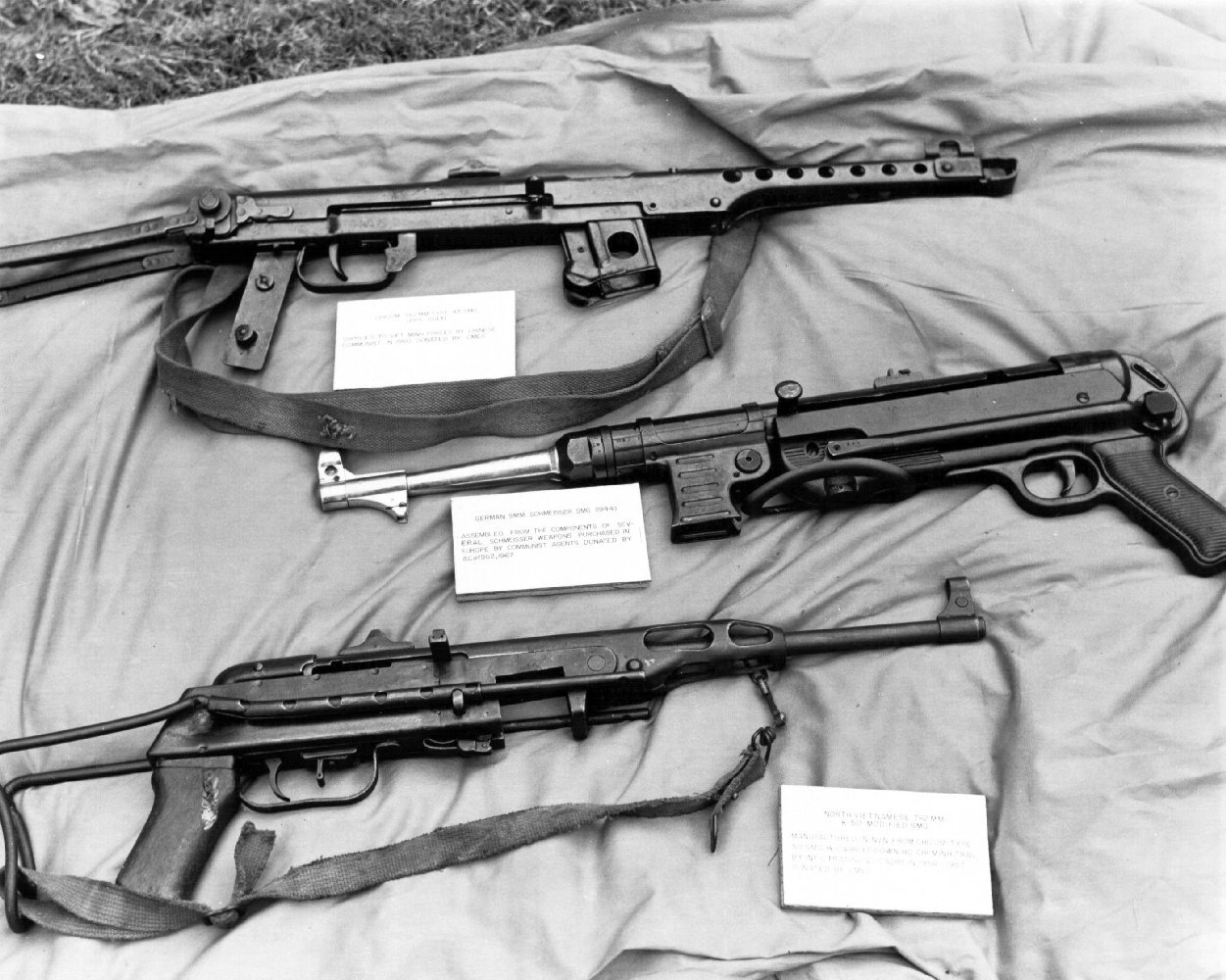
Captured PAVN weapons

During the early stages of their insurgency, the Viet Cong mainly sustained itself with captured arms (often of American manufacture) or crude, self-made weapons (e.g. copies of the US Thompson submachine gun and shotguns made of galvanized pipes). Most arms were captured from poorly defended ARVN militia outposts.

Communist forces were principally armed with Chinese and Soviet weaponry though some VC guerrilla units were equipped with Western infantry weapons either captured from French stocks during the first Indochina war, such as the MAT-49, or from ARVN units or requisitioned through illicit purchase.

By Autumn of 1967, all Viet Cong battalions were reequipped with arms of Soviet design such as the AK-47 and the RPG-2. Their weapons were principally of Chinese or Soviet manufacture. The period up to the conventional phase in the 1970, the Viet Cong and NVA were mostly limited to mortars, recoilless rifles, and small-arms and had significantly lighter equipment and firepower relative to the US arsenal, relying on ambushes, with superior stealth, planning, marksmanship, and small-unit tactics to face the disproportionate US technological advantage.

Many divisions within the NVA would incorporate armoured and mechanised battalions including the Type 59 tank, BTR-60, Type 60 artillery, and rapidly altered and integrated new war doctrines following the Tet Offensive into a mobile combined-arms force. The North Vietnamese had both amphibious tanks (such as the PT-76) and light tanks (such the Type 62) used during the conventional phase. Experimental Soviet equipment started being used against ARVN forces at the same time, including Man-portable air-defense system SA-7 Grail and anti-tank missiles including the AT-3 Sagger. By 1975, they had fully transformed from the strategy of mobile light-infantry and using the people's war concept used against the United States.

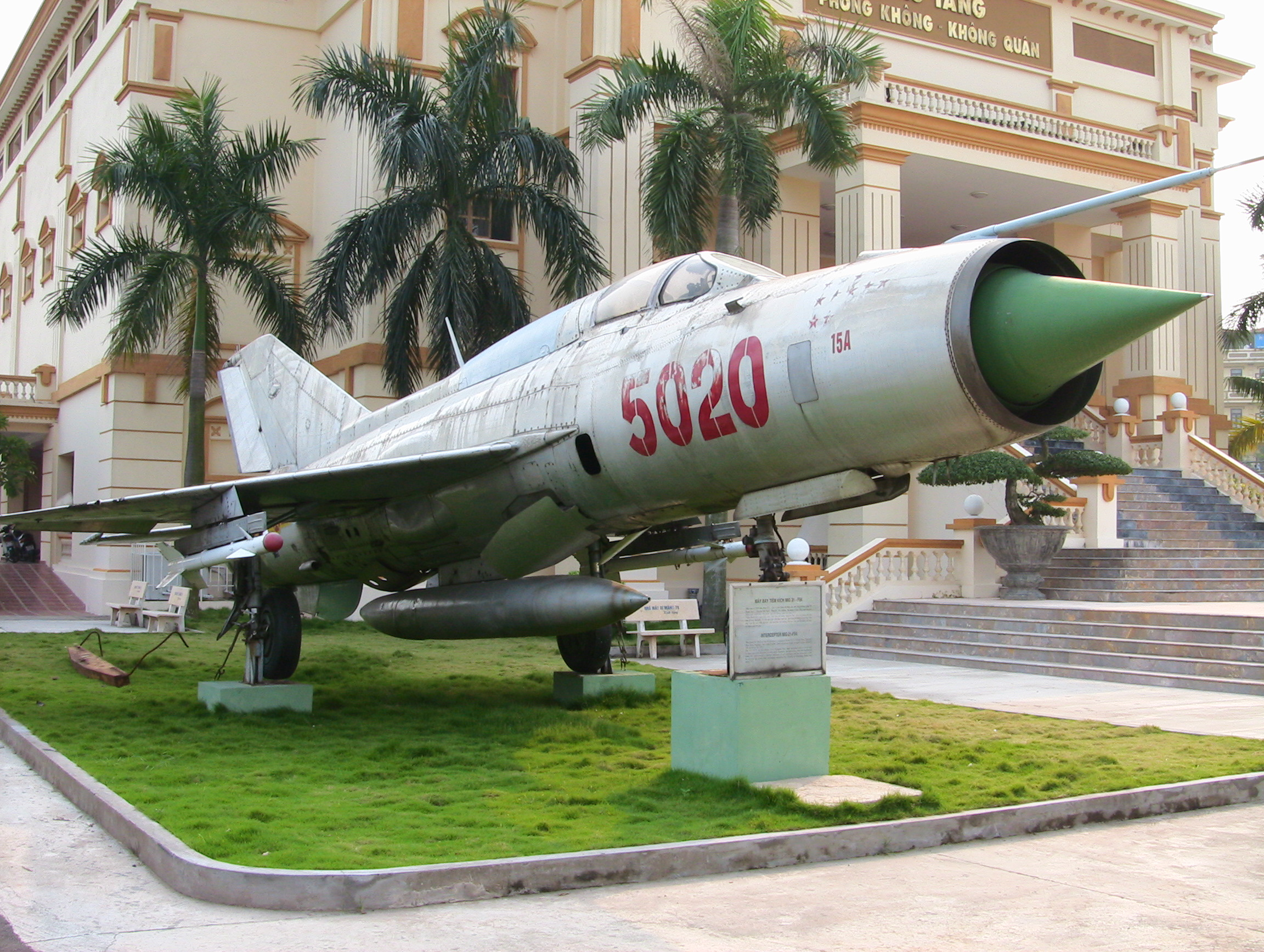
A MiG-21 of the Vietnam People's Air Force, which 13 out of 19 of the VPAF's top fighter aces had flown in most of the successful interception missions against USAF and USN aircraft.

== US weapons ==
The American M16 rifle and XM177 carbine, which both replaced the M14, were lighter and considered more accurate than the AK-47 but in Vietnam was prone to "failure to extract", in which the spent cartridge case remained stuck in the chamber after a round was fired, preventing the next round from feeding and jamming the gun. This was ultimately traced to an inadequately tested switch in propellants from DuPont's proprietary IMR 4475 to Olin's WC 846, that Army Ordnance had ordered out of concern for standardization and mass production capacity.

The heavily armored, 90 mm gun M48A3 'Patton' tank saw extensive action during the Vietnam War and over 600 were deployed with U.S. forces. They played an important role in infantry support though there were a few tank versus tank battles. The M67A1 flamethrower tank (nicknamed the Zippo) was an M48 variant used in Vietnam. The use of this euphemistically nicknamed tank should not be confused with the widespread use of actual Zippo lighters to burn villages, which gave rise to the nickname of "Zippo squads". (Far from all such squads fielded the tank.) The Zippo nickname was also applied to man-portable flamethrowers. Artillery was used extensively by both sides but the Americans were able to ferry the lightweight 105 mm M102 howitzer by helicopter to remote locations on quick notice. With its 17-mile (27 km) range, the Soviet 130 mm M-46 towed field gun was a highly regarded weapon and used to good effect by the PAVN. It was countered by the long-range, American 175 mm M107 Self-Propelled Gun.

The United States had air superiority, though many aircraft were lost to surface-to-air missiles and anti-aircraft artillery. U.S. airpower was credited with breaking the siege of Khe Sanh and blunting the 1972 Easter Offensive against South Vietnam. At sea, the U.S. Navy had the run of the coastline, using aircraft carriers as platforms for offshore strikes and other naval vessels for offshore artillery support. Offshore naval fire played a pivotal role in the Battle of Huế in February 1968, providing accurate fire in support of the U.S. counter-offensive to retake the city.

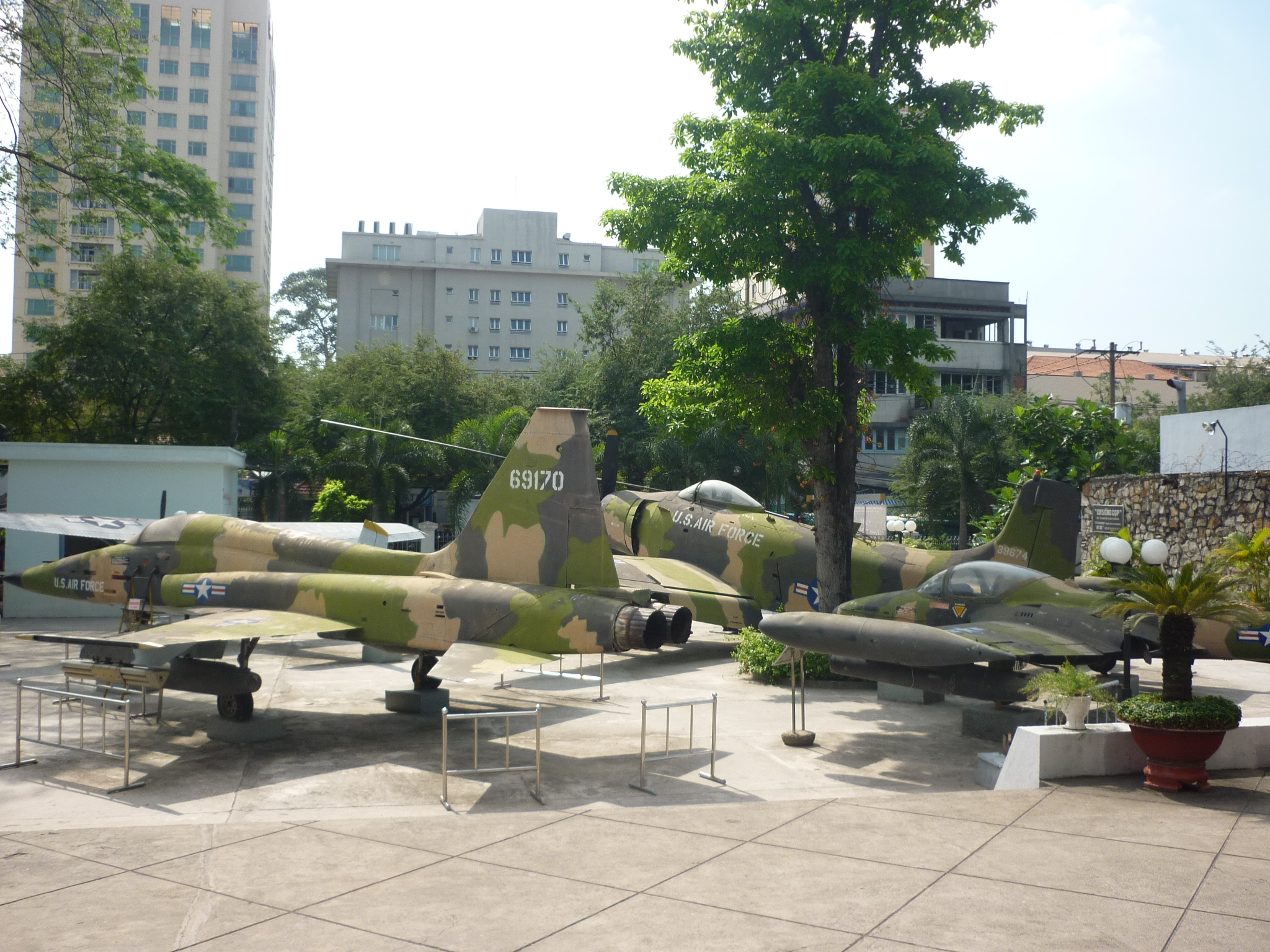
Captured South Vietnamese warplanes in Ho Chi Minh City

The Vietnam War was the first conflict that saw wide-scale tactical deployment of helicopters. The Bell UH-1 Iroquois nicknamed "Huey" was used extensively in counter-guerilla operations both as a troop carrier and a gunship. In the latter role it was outfitted with a variety of armaments including M60 machine guns, multi-barrelled 7.62 mm Miniguns and unguided air-to-surface rockets. The Hueys were also successfully used in MEDEVAC and search and rescue roles. Two aircraft which were prominent in the war were the AC-130 "Spectre" Gunship and the UH-1 "Huey" gunship. The AC-130 was a heavily armed ground-attack aircraft variant of the C-130 Hercules transport plane; it was used to provide close air support, air interdiction and force protection. The AC-130H "Spectre" was armed with two 20 mm M61 Vulcan cannons, one Bofors 40 mm autocannon, and one 105 mm M102 howitzer. The Huey is a military helicopter powered by one turboshaft engine, and about 7,000 UH-1 aircraft saw service in Vietnam. At their disposal ground forces had access to B-52 and F-4 Phantom II and others to launch napalm, white phosphorus, tear gas and chemical weapons as well. The aircraft ordnance used during the war included precision-guided munition, cluster bombs, a thickening–gelling agent generally mixed with petroleum or a similar fuel for use in an incendiary device, initially against buildings and later mostly as an anti-personnel weapon that sticks to skin and can burn down to the bone.

The Claymore M18A1, an anti-personnel mine, was widely used. It is command-detonated, directionally shooting 700 steel pellets into the kill zone.

== Weapons of the South Vietnamese, U.S., South Korean, Australian, New Zealand and Thailand Forces ==
=== Hand combat weapons ===
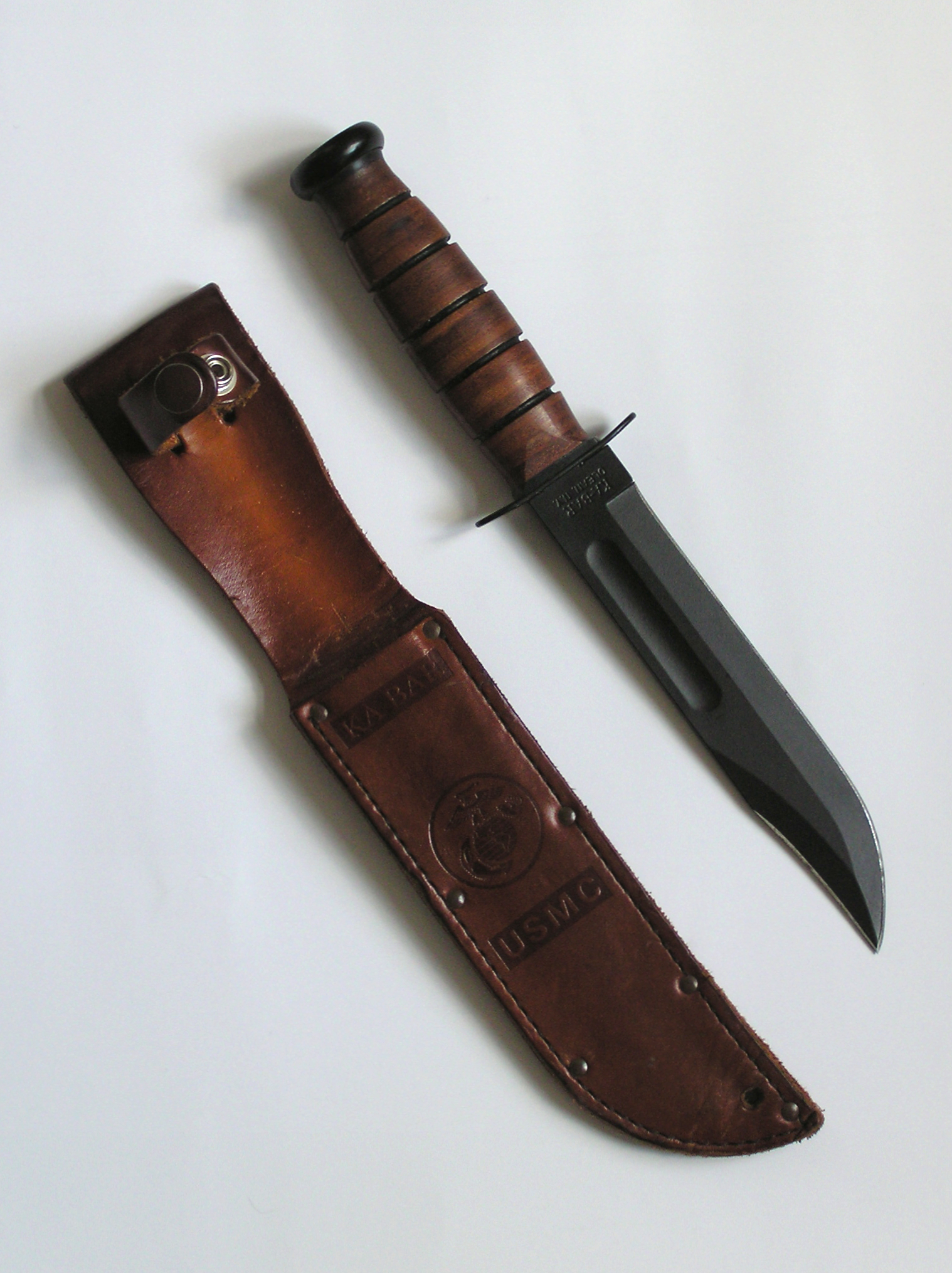
The Ka-Bar knife was the most famous edged weapon of the war.

- L1A1 and L1A2 bayonets – used on L1A1 Self-Loading Rifle
- M1905 bayonet – used on the M1 Garand.
- M1917 bayonet – used on various shotguns.
- M1 Bayonet – used on the M1 Garand.
- M3 fighting knife
- M4 bayonet – used on the M1 and M2 Carbine.
- M5 bayonet – used on the M1 Garand.
- M6 bayonet – used on the M14.
- M7 Bayonet – used on the M16.
- Ka-Bar Utility/fighting Knife – used by the US Army, Navy, and Marine Corps.
- Randall Made Knives – personally purchased by some US soldiers.
- Bow – used by US Mobile Riverine Force.
- Crossbow – used by South Vietnamese Montagnards

=== Pistols and revolvers ===
- Colt M1911A1 – standard US and ARVN sidearm.
- Colt Commander – used by US military officers and US Special forces.
- Browning Hi-Power – used by Australian and New Zealand forces (L9 pistol). Also used on an unofficial basis by US reconnaissance and Special Forces units.
- Colt Detective Special – .38 Special revolver, used by some ARVN officers
- Colt Police Positive Special – .38 Special revolver, used by USAF and tunnel rats
- FN Baby Browning- .25 ACP pistol, used as a last resort weapon by MACVSOG.
- High Standard HDM – Integrally suppressed .22LR handgun, supplemented by the Mark 22 Mod 0 in the later stages of the war.
- Ingram MAC-10 – compact submachine gun used by US special operations forces.
- Luger P08 – CIA provided pistol
- Quiet Special Purpose Revolver – .40 caliber suppressed revolver used by tunnel rats.
- Smith & Wesson Model 10 – .38 Special revolver used by ARVN, by US Army and USAF pilots and by tunnel rats
- Colt Python – .357 Magnum revolver carried by MACVSOG.
- Smith & Wesson Mark 22 Mod.0 "Hush Puppy" – Suppressed pistol used by US Navy SEALs and other U.S. special operations forces.
- Walther P38 – CIA provided pistol
- Walther PPK – Suppressed pistol used by MACVSOG recon skydiver team
- Welrod -Suppressed pistol used by MACVSOG.

=== Infantry rifles ===
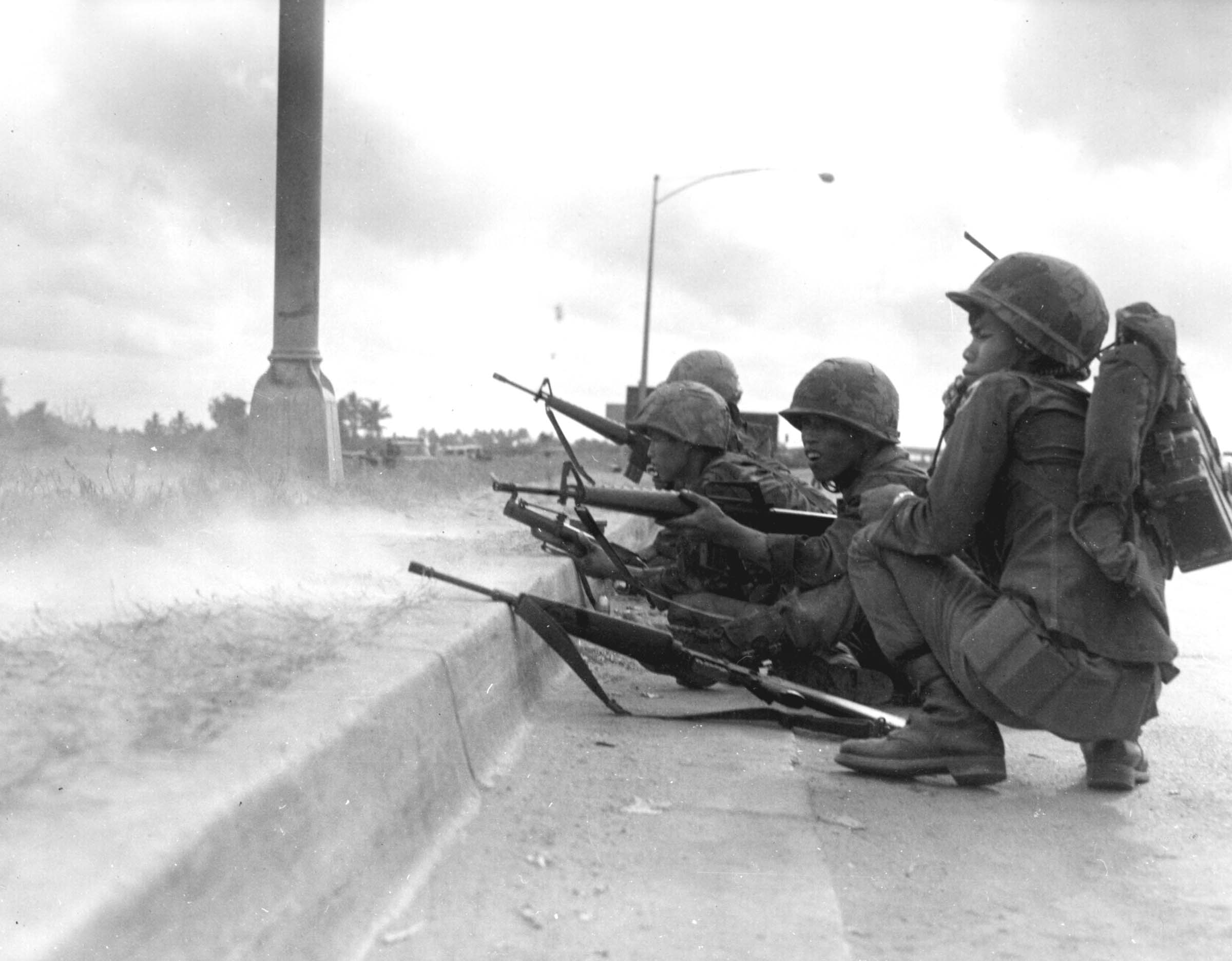
Vietnamese Rangers with M16 rifles in Saigon during the Tết Offensive

- L1A1 Self-Loading Rifle – used by Australian and New Zealand soldiers

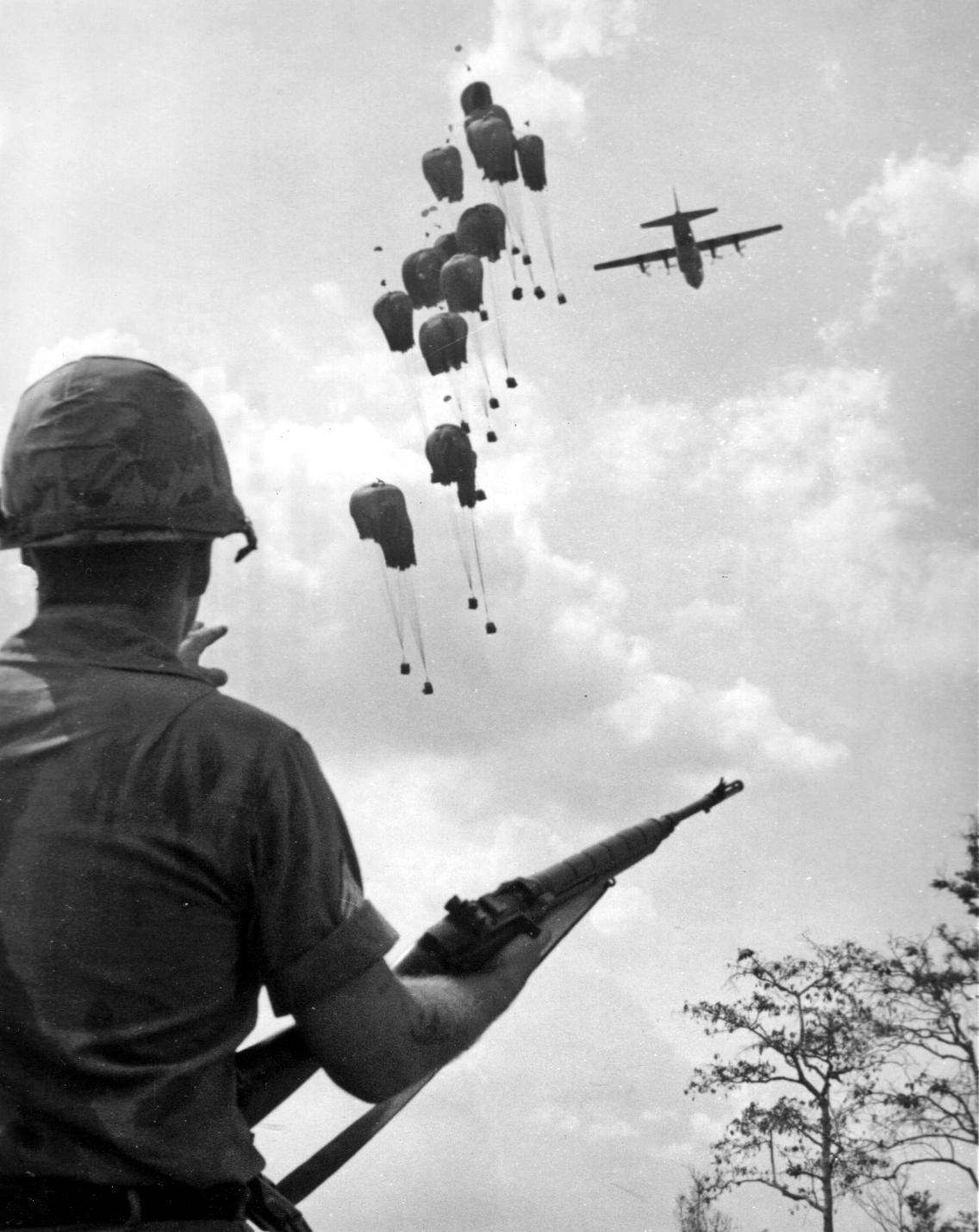
A U.S. soldier with an M14 watches as supplies are dropped in Vietnam, 1967.

- M1 Garand – used by the South Vietnamese and South Koreans
- M1, M1A1, & M2 Carbine – used by the South Vietnamese Military, Police and Security Forces, South Koreans,

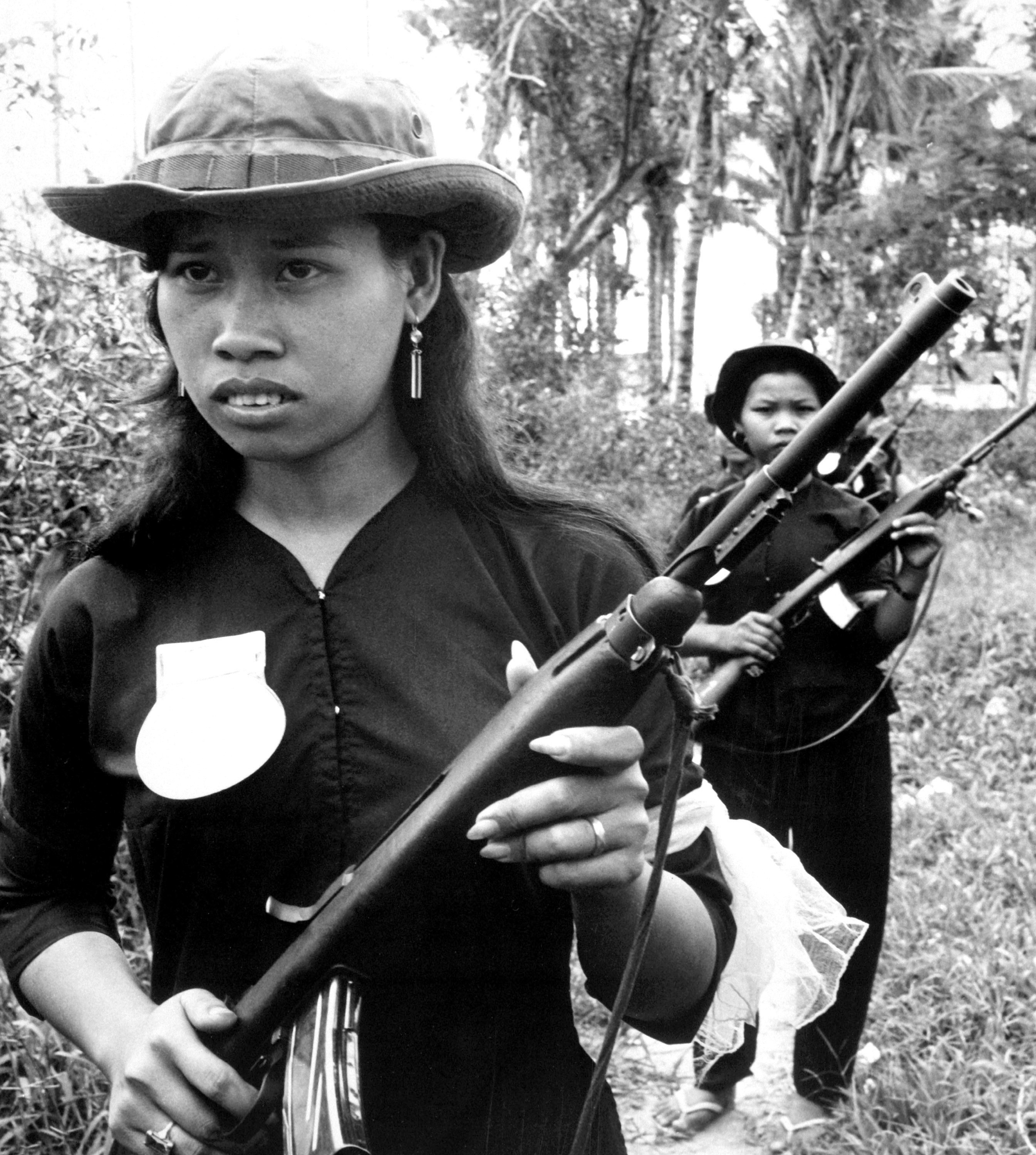
South Vietnamese People's Self-Defense Force militiawomen with M2 carbines

- M14, M14E2, M14A1 – issued to most U.S. troops from the early stages of the war until 1967–68, when it was replaced by the M16.
- M16, XM16E1, and M16A1 – M16 was issued in 1964, but due to reliability issues, it was replaced by the M16A1 in 1967 which added the forward assist and chrome-lined barrel to the rifle for increased reliability.
- CAR-15 – carbine variant of the M16 produced in very limited numbers, fielded by special operations early on. Later supplemented by the improved XM177.
- XM177 (Colt Commando)/GAU-5 – further development of the CAR-15, used heavily by MACV-SOG, the US Air Force, and US Army.
- Stoner 63 – used by US Navy SEALs and USMC.
- T223 – a copy of the Heckler & Koch HK33 built under license by Harrington & Richardson used in small numbers by SEAL teams. Even though the empty H&R T223 was 0.9 pounds (0.41 kg) heavier than an empty M16A1, the weapon had a forty-round magazine available for it and this made it attractive to the SEALS.
- MAS-36 rifle – used by South Vietnamese militias
- AK-47, AKM, and Type 56 – Captured rifles were used by South Vietnamese and U.S. forces.

=== Rifles: sniper, marksman ===
- M1C/D Garand and MC52 – used by CIA advisors, the USMC and the US Navy early in the war. About 520 were supplied to the ARVN and 460 to the Thai forces.
- M1903A4 Springfield – used by the USMC early in the war, replaced by the M40.
- M21 Sniper Weapon System – sniper variant of the M14 rifle used by the US Army.
- M40 (Remington Model 700)– bolt-action sniper rifle meant to replace the M1903A4 Springfield rifle and Winchester Model 70; used by the USMC
- Parker-Hale M82 – used by ANZAC forces
- Winchester Model 70 – used by the USMC

=== Submachine guns ===
- Beretta M12 – limited numbers were used by U.S. Embassy security units.
- Carl Gustaf m/45 – used by Navy SEALs in the start of the war, but later replaced by the Smith & Wesson M76 in the late 1960s. Significant numbers also used by MAC-V-SOG, South Vietnamese, and small numbers in Laos by advisors, and Laotian fighters.
- Smith & Wesson M76 – copy of the Carl Gustaf m/45; few were shipped to Navy SEALs fighting in Vietnam.
- F1 submachine gun – replaced the Owen Gun in Australian service.
- M3 Grease gun – standard U.S. military submachine gun, also used by the South Vietnamese
- M50/55 Reising – limited numbers were used by MACVSOG and other irregular forces.
- Madsen M-50 – used by South Vietnamese forces, supplied by the CIA.
- MAS-38 submachine gun – used by South Vietnamese militias.
- MAT-49 submachine gun – used by South Vietnamese militias. Captured models were used in limited numbers
- MP 40 submachine gun – used by South Vietnamese forces, supplied by the CIA.
- Owen Gun – standard Australian submachine-gun in the early stages of the war, later replaced by the F1 and withdrawn from combat use by 1971.
- Sten submachine gun – used by US special operations forces, often with a suppressor mounted.
- Sterling submachine gun – used by Australian Special Air Service Regiment and other special operations units.
- Thompson submachine gun – used often by South Vietnamese troops, and in small quantities by US artillery and helicopter units.
- Uzi – used by special operations forces and some South Vietnamese, supplied from Israel.

=== Shotguns ===
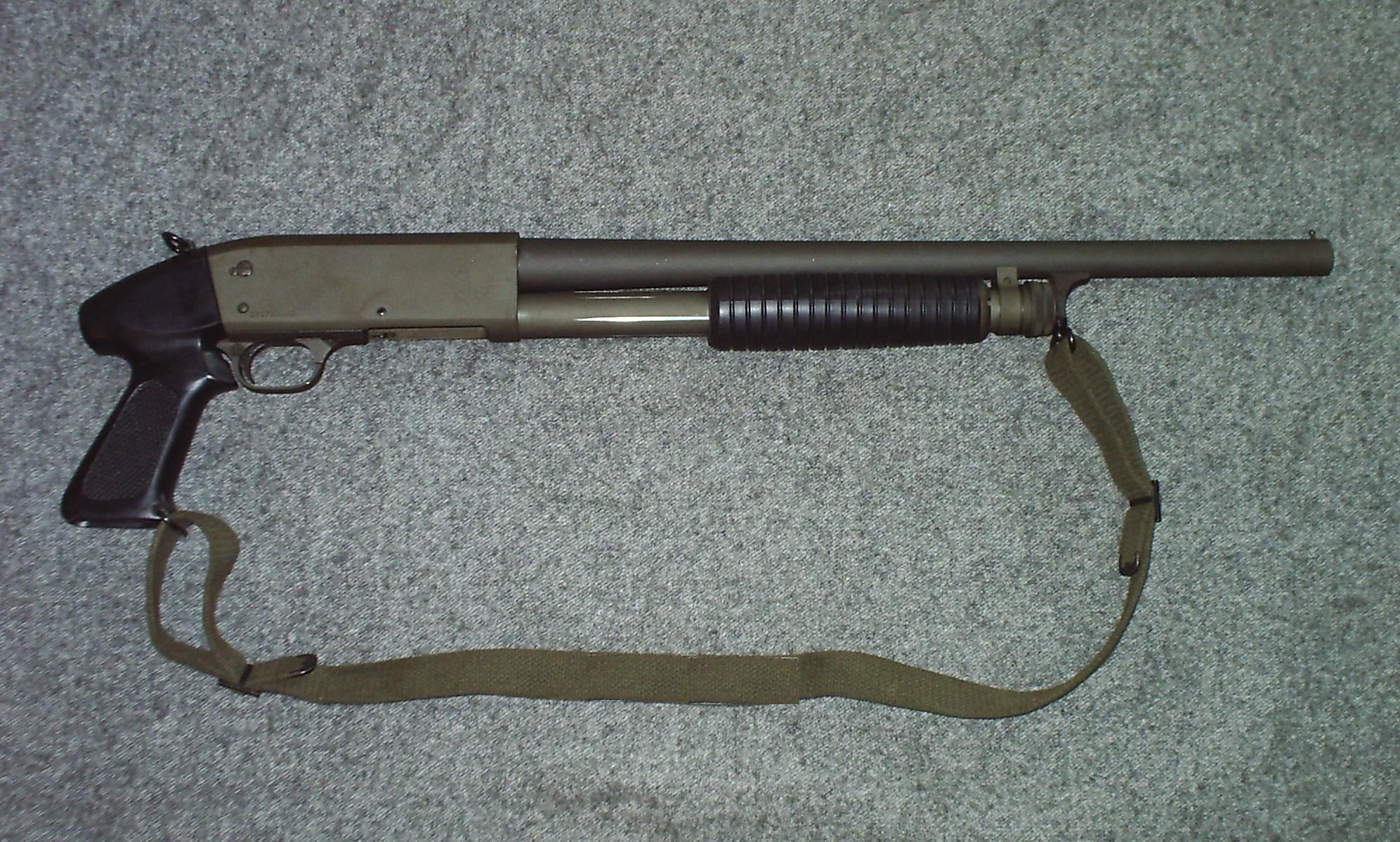
Ithaca 37

Shotguns were used as an individual weapon during jungle patrol; infantry units were authorized a shotgun by TO&E (Table of Organization & Equipment). Shotguns were not general issue to all infantrymen, but were select issue weapons, such as one per squad, etc.

- Ithaca Model 37 – pump-action shotgun used by the United States and ARVN.
- Remington Model 10 – pump-action shotgun used by the United States.
- Remington Model 11-48 – semi-automatic shotgun used by US Army.
- Remington Model 31 – pump-action shotgun used by the US Army, the SEALs and the ARVN.
- Remington Model 870 – pump-action shotgun, main shotgun used by Marines, Army, and Navy after 1966.
- Remington 7188 – experimental select fire shotgun, withdrawn due to lack of reliability. Used by US Navy SEALs
- Savage Model 69E – pump-action shotgun used by the US Army.
- Savage Model 720 – semi-automatic shotgun.
- Stevens Model 77E – pump-action shotgun used by Army and Marine forces. Almost 70,000 Model 77Es were procured by the military for use in SE Asia during the 1960s. Also very popular with the ARVN because of its small size.
- Stevens Model 520/620
- Winchester Model 1912 – used by USMC.
- Winchester Model 1200 – pump-action shotgun used by the US Army.
- Winchester Model 1897 – used by the Marines during the early stages of the war.

=== Machine guns ===
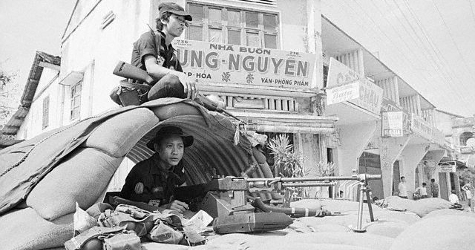
- South Vietnamese soldier with a M1918 Browning Automatic Rifle
  M60 machine gun – standard General-purpose machine gun for US, ANZAC, and ARVN forces throughout the war.

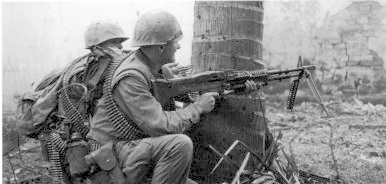
US Marine fires his M60 machine gun at an enemy position during the Battle of Huế.

- Colt Machine Gun – experimental light machine gun deployed by SEAL Team 2 in 1970.
- M1918 Browning Automatic Rifle – used by the ARVN during the early stages of the war, as well as many that were airdropped into Laos and used by Laotian fighters.
- FM 24/29 light machine gun – used by South Vietnamese militias
- RPD machine gun (and Type 56) – captured and used by reconnaissance teams of Mobile Strike Forces, MAC-V-SOG and other special operation forces. Also commonly modified to cut down the barrel.
- Stoner M63A Commando & Mark 23 Mod.0 – used by Navy SEALs and tested by Force Recon.
- M134 Minigun – 7.62 mm vehicle mounted machine gun (rare)
- M1919 Browning machine gun (and variants such as M37) – vehicle mounted machine gun. Meanwhile, still of use by many South Vietnamese infantry.
- M73 machine gun – tank mounted machine gun.
- Browning M2HB .50cal Heavy Machine Gun

=== Grenades and mines ===
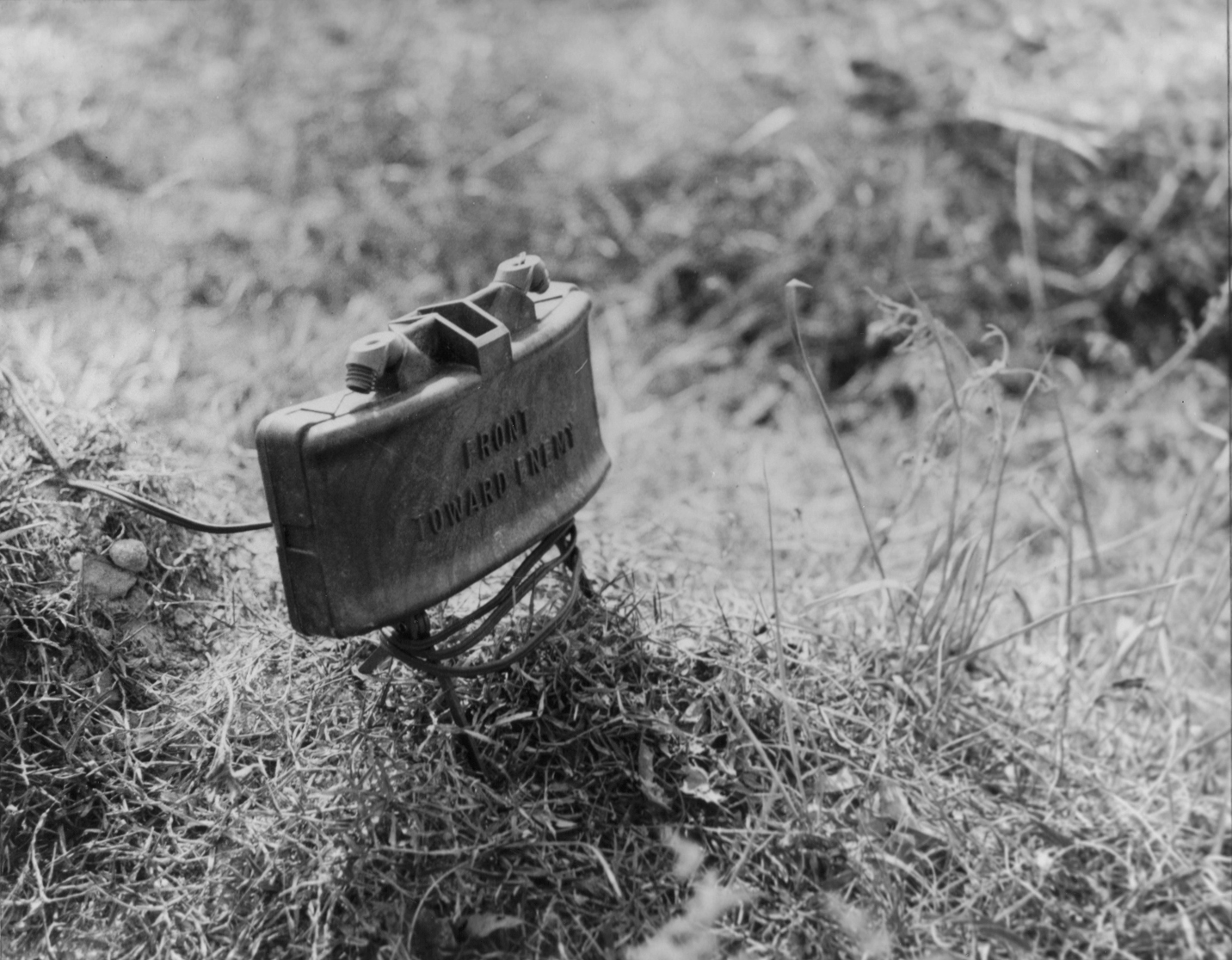
Claymore anti-personnel mine in use in Vietnam

- AN-M8 – white smoke grenade
- C4 explosive
- Mark 2 fragmentation grenade
- M1 smoke pot
- M26 fragmentation grenade and many subvariants
- M59 and M67 fragmentation grenade
- M6/M7-series riot control grenades – Used to clear NVA/VC out of caves, tunnels and buildings or stop a pursuer.
- AN/M14 TH3 thermite grenade – Incendiary grenade used to destroy equipment and as a fire-starting device.
- M15 and M34 smoke grenades – filled with white phosphorus, which ignites on contact with air and creates thick white smoke. Used for signalling and screening purposes, as well as an anti-personnel weapon in enclosed spaces, as the burning white phosphorus would rapidly consume any oxygen, suffocating the victims.
- M18 smoke grenade – Signalling/screening grenade available in red, yellow, green, and purple.
- V40 Mini-Grenade
- OF 37 grenade and DF 37 grenade, French grenades used by the ARVN in the 1950s
- XM58 riot control grenade – A miniature riot control grenade used by MACVSOG and Navy SEALs.
- M14 mine – anti-personnel blast mine
- M15 mine – anti-tank mine
- M16 mine – bounding anti-personnel fragmentation mine
- M18/M18A1 Claymore – command-detonated directional anti-personnel mine
- M19 mine – anti-tank mine

=== Grenade and Rocket Launchers ===
- M1/M2 rifle grenade adapters – used to convert a standard fragmentation grenade (M1) or smoke grenade (M2) into a rifle grenade when used with the M7 grenade launcher.
- M7 and M8 rifle grenade launcher – rifle grenade launcher used with respectively the M1 Garand and the M1 carbine, used by the South Vietnamese. Could fire the M9 and M17 rifle grenades.
- M79 grenade launcher – main U.S. grenade launcher used by all branches of the US military, ANZAC forces, and ARVN.
- China Lake grenade launcher – pump action weapon used in very small numbers.
- XM148 grenade launcher – experimental underbarrel 40 mm grenade launcher attached to the M16 rifle or XM177 carbine. Also issued to Australian Special Air Service Regiment in conjunction with the modified L1A1 and Sterling Submachine Gun. Withdrawn due to safety reasons.
- M203 grenade launcher – one-shot 40mm underslung grenade launcher designed to attach to an M16 rifle (or XM177 carbine, with modifications to the launcher). First tested in combat April 1969.
- Mark 18 Mod 0 grenade launcher – Hand-cranked, belt-fed, 40x46mm grenade launcher used by the US Navy.
- Mark 19 grenade launcher – Automatic, belt-fed, 40x53mm grenade launcher.
- Mk 20 Mod 0 grenade launcher – Automatic, belt-fed, 40x46mm grenade launcher. Used mostly by riverine crews but also by Air Force Special Operations.
- XM174 grenade launcher – Automatic, belt-fed, 40x46mm grenade launcher used mainly by the US Army.
- Bazooka – The M9 variant was supplied to the ARVN during the early years of the war, while the M20 "Super Bazooka" was used by the USMC and the ARVN until the full introduction of the M67 90mm recoilless rifle and of the M72 LAW.
- BGM-71 TOW – wire-guided anti-tank missile used in 1972 by the US, and by the ARVN from 1972 to the end of the war.
- FIM-43 Redeye MANPADS (Man-Portable Air-Defence System) – shoulder-fired heat-seeking anti-air missile, used by the USMC.
- M72 LAW – 66 mm anti-tank rocket launcher.
- RPG-2 - Used by MACVSOG
- XM202 – experimental four-shot 66mm incendiary rocket launcher.

=== Flamethrowers ===
- M2A1-7 and M9A1-7 flamethrowers

=== Infantry support weapons ===
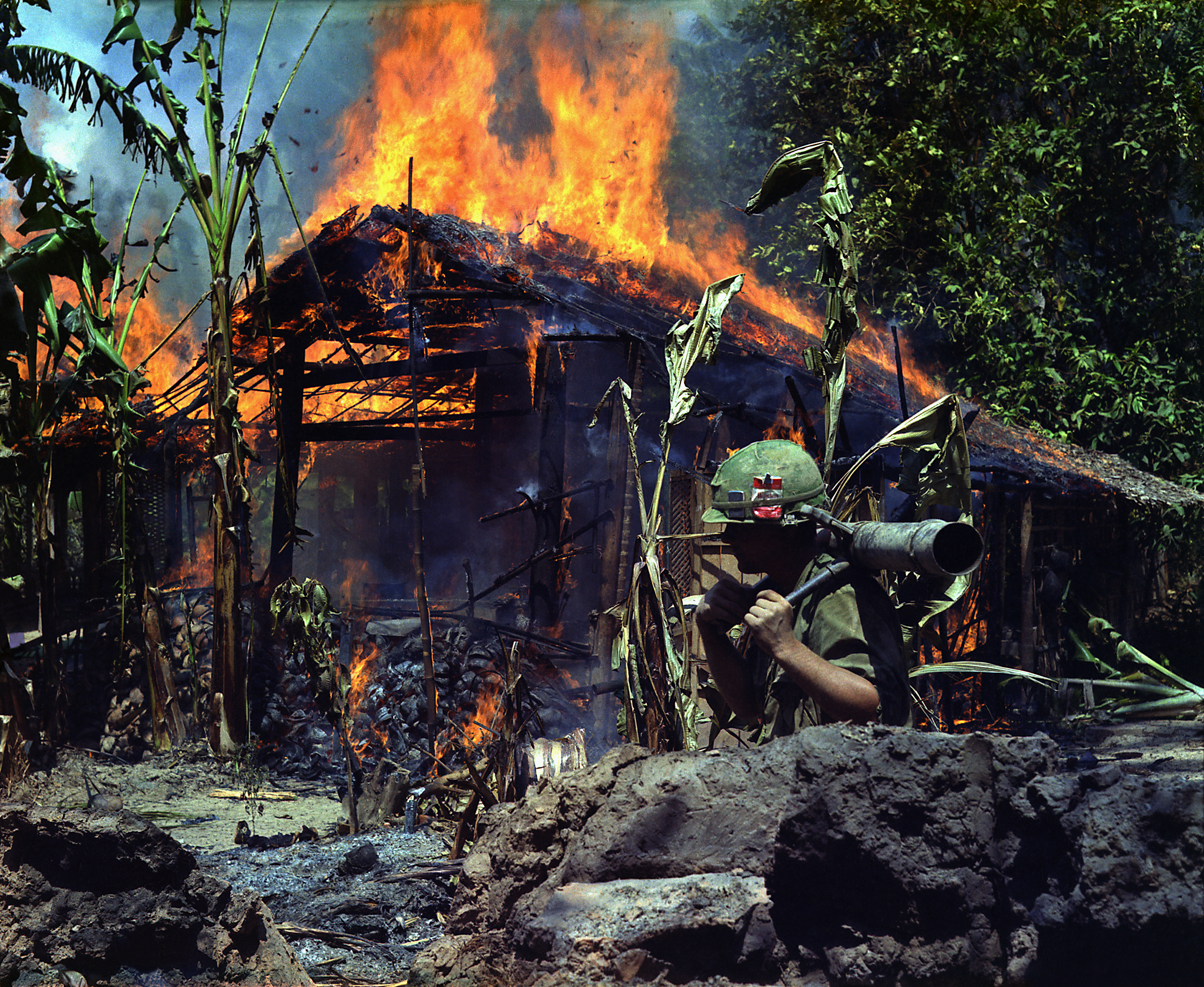
A US marine carries an M67 recoilless rifle past a burning Viet Cong base camp in Mỹ Tho, South Vietnam, 1968

- M18 recoilless rifle – 57mm shoulder-fired/tripod mounted recoilless rifle, used by the ARVN early in the war.
- M20 recoilless rifle – 75mm tripod/vehicle-mounted recoilless rifle, used by US and ARVN forces early in the war.
- M67 recoilless rifle – 90mm shoulder-fired anti-tank recoilless rifle, used by the US Army, US Marine Corps, ANZAC and ARVN selected forces.
- M40 recoilless rifle 106mm tripod/vehicle-mounted recoilless rifle.
- M2 mortar – 60 mm mortar, used with the lighter but less accurate and lower-range M19 mortar.
- M19 mortar – 60 mm mortar, used with the older, heavier M2 mortar.
- Brandt Mle 27/31 – 81 mm mortar, used by ARVN forces
- M1 mortar – 81 mm mortar, used by ARVN forces.
- M29 mortar – 81 mm mortar, used by US and ARVN forces.
- L16A1 mortar – 81mm, used by ANZAC forces.
- 82-BM-37 – captured 82 mm mortar, few used by USMC with US rounds.
- M30 mortar 107 mm mortar, used by US and ARVN forces.
  - M98 Howtar, variant of the latter mounted on a M116 howitzer carriage.

=== Artillery ===
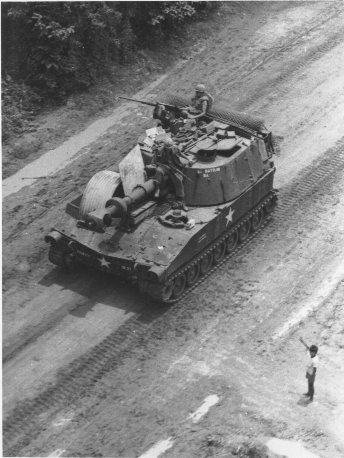
Self-propelled Howitzer M109 in Vietnam

- M55 quad machine gun – used to defend US Army bases and on vehicles
- Oerlikon 20 mm cannon – used on riverine crafts
- Bofors 40 mm gun – used on riverine crafts
- 105 mm Howitzer M101A1/M2A1
- 105 mm Howitzer M102
- 155 mm Howitzer M114
- M53 Self-propelled 155 mm gun
- M55 Self-propelled 8-inch howitzer
- M107 Self-propelled 175 mm gun
- M108 Self-propelled 105 mm howitzer
- M109 Self-propelled 155 mm howitzer
- M110 Self-propelled 8-inch howitzer
- L5 pack howitzer 105 mm pack howitzer used by Australia and New Zealand
- MIM-23 Hawk – medium-range surface to air missile used in very small quantities by the US Marines.

==== Artillery ammunition types ====
- HE (High explosive) – standard artillery round.
- High-explosive anti-tank round – fired by 105 mm guns.
- White phosphorus – used for screening or incendiary purposes.
- Smoke shells – used for screening.
- Leaflet shell
- Beehive flechette rounds – antipersonnel rounds.
- Improved conventional munition – antipersonnel shell with submunitions.

=== Aircraft ===
(listed alphabetically by modified/basic mission code, then numerically in ascending order by design number/series letter)

- A-1 Skyraider – ground attack aircraft
- A-3 Skywarrior – carrier-based bomber
- A-4 Skyhawk – carrier-based strike aircraft
- A-6 Intruder – carrier-based all weather strike aircraft
- A-7 Corsair II – carrier-based strike aircraft
- A-26 Invader – light bomber
- A-37 Dragonfly – ground attack aircraft
- AC-47 Spooky – gunship
- AC-119G "Shadow" – gunship
- AC-119K "Stinger" – gunship
- AC-130 "Spectre" – gunship
- AU-24 Stallion – ground attack aircraft
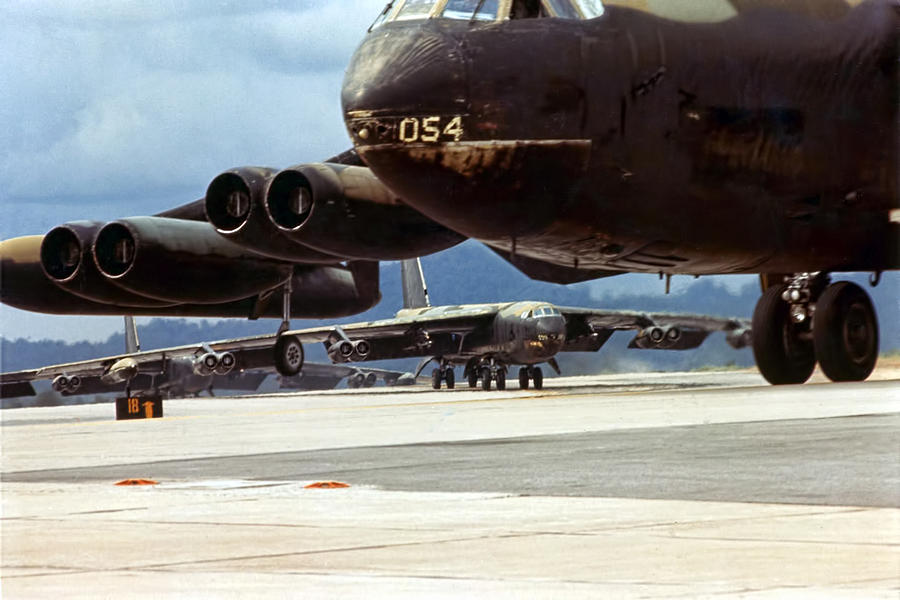
- B-52 Stratofortress at Thailand Air Base
  B-52 Stratofortress – heavy bomber
- B-57 Canberra – medium bomber
- Canberra B.20 – Royal Australian Air Force medium bomber
- C-1 Trader – cargo/transport aircraft
- C-2 Greyhound – cargo/transport aircraft
- C-5 Galaxy – strategic lift cargo aircraft
- C-7 Caribou – tactical cargo aircraft, used by the U.S. Air Force, the Royal Australian Air Force and the South Vietnamese Air Force
- C-46 Commando – cargo/transport aircraft
- C-47 – cargo/transport aircraft
- C-54 – transport aircraft
- C-119 Boxcar – cargo/transport aircraft
- C-121 Constellation – transport aircraft
- C-123 Provider – cargo/transport aircraft
- C-124 Globemaster II – cargo/transport aircraft
- C-130 Hercules – cargo/transport plane
- C-133 Cargomaster – cargo/transport aircraft
- C-141 Starlifter – strategic cargo aircraft
- E-1 Tracer – carrier-based airborne early warning (AEW) aircraft
- E-2 Hawkeye – carrier-based airborne early warning (AEW) aircraft
- EA-3 Skywarrior – carrier-based tactical electronic reconnaissance aircraft
- EA-6B Prowler – carrier-based electronic warfare & attack aircraft
- EB-57 Canberra – tactical electronic reconnaissance aircraft
- EB-66 – tactical electronic reconnaissance aircraft
- EC-121 – radar warning or sensor relay aircraft
- EF-10 Skyknight – tactical electronic warfare aircraft
- EKA-3B Skywarrior – carrier-based tactical electronic warfare aircraft
- F-4 Phantom II – carrier and land based fighter-bomber
- F-5 Freedom Fighter – light-weight fighter used in strike aircraft role
- F8F Bearcat – piston fighter-bomber, used by the South Vietnamese Air Force until 1964.
- F-8 Crusader – carrier and land based fighter-bomber
- F-14 Tomcat – carrier-based fighter, made its combat debut during Operation Frequent Wind, the evacuation of Saigon, in April 1975.
- F-100 Super Sabre – fighter-bomber
- F-102 Delta Dagger – fighter
- F-104 Starfighter – fighter
- F-105 Thunderchief – fighter-bomber
- F-111 Aardvark – medium bomber
- HU-16 Albatross – rescue amphibian
- KA-3 Skywarrior – carrier-based tactical aerial refueler aircraft
- KA-6 Intruder – carrier-based tactical aerial refueler aircraft
- KC-130 Hercules – tactical aerial refueler/assault transport aircraft
- KC-135 Stratotanker – aerial refueling aircraft
- O-1 Bird Dog – light observation airplane
- O-2 Skymaster – observation aircraft
- OV-1 Mohawk – battlefield surveillance and light strike aircraft
- OV-10 Bronco – light attack/observation aircraft
- P-2 Neptune – maritime patrol aircraft
- P-3 Orion – maritime patrol aircraft
- P-5 Marlin – antisubmarine seaplane
- QU-22 Pave Eagle (Beech Bonanza) – electronic monitoring signal relay aircraft
- RA-3B Skywarrior – carrier-based tactical photographic reconnaissance aircraft
- RA-5C Vigilante – carrier-based tactical photographic reconnaissance aircraft
- RB-47 Stratojet – photographic reconnaissance aircraft
- RB-57 Canberra – tactical photographic reconnaissance aircraft
- RB-66 – tactical photographic reconnaissance aircraft
- RF-4 Phantom II – carrier and land-based tactical photographic reconnaissance aircraft
- RF-8 Crusader – carrier-based tactical photographic reconnaissance aircraft
- RF-101 Voodoo – tactical photographic reconnaissance aircraft
- RT-33A – reconnaissance jet
- S-2 Tracker – carrier-based anti-submarine warfare (ASW) aircraft
- SR-71 Blackbird – strategic reconnaissance aircraft
- T-28 Trojan – trainer/ground attack aircraft
- T-41 Mescalero – trainer aircraft
- U-1 Otter – transport aircraft
- U-2 – reconnaissance aircraft
- U-6 Beaver – utility aircraft
- U-8 Seminole – transport/electronic survey aircraft
- U-10 Helio Courier – utility aircraft
- U-17 Skywagon – utility aircraft
- U-21 Ute – liaison and electronic survey
- YO-3 Quiet Star – light observation airplane

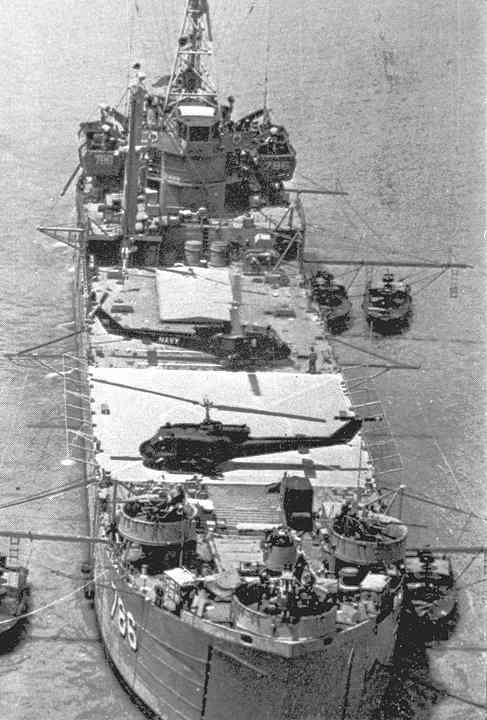
USS Garrett County at anchor in the Mekong Delta with two UH-1B Iroquois helicopters on deck

==== Helicopters ====
(listed numerically in ascending order by design number/series letter, then alphabetically by mission code)

- UH-1 Iroquois "Huey" – utility transport and gunship helicopter
- AH-1G HueyCobra – attack helicopter
- AH-1J SeaCobra – twin-engine attack helicopter
- UH-1N Iroquois – twin-engine utility helicopter
- UH-2 Seasprite – carrier-based utility helicopter
- CH-3 Sea King – long-range transport helicopter
- HH-3 "Jolly Green Giant" – long-range combat search and rescue (CSAR) helicopter
- SH-3 Sea King – carrier-based anti-submarine warfare (ASW) helicopter
- OH-6A Cayuse "Loach" (from LOH – Light Observation Helicopter) – light transport/observation (i.e. scout) helicopter
- OH-13 Sioux – light observation helicopter
- UH-19 Chickasaw – utility transport helicopter
- CH-21 Shawnee – cargo/transport helicopter
- OH-23 Raven – light utility helicopter
- CH-34 Choctaw – cargo/transport helicopter
- CH-37 Mojave – cargo/transport helicopter
- HH-43 Huskie – rescue helicopter
- CH-46 Sea Knight – cargo/transport helicopter
- CH-47 Chinook – cargo/transport helicopter
- CH-53 Sea Stallion – heavy-lift transport helicopter
- HH-53 "Super Jolly Green Giant" – long-range combat search and rescue (CSAR) helicopter
- CH-54 Tarhe "Sky Crane" – heavy lift helicopter
- OH-58A Kiowa – light transport/observation helicopter

=== Aircraft ordnance ===
- GBUs
- CBUs
- BLU-82 Daisy cutter
- Napalm
- Bomb, 250 lb, 500 lb, 750 lb, 1000 lb, HE (high explosive), general-purpose
- Rocket, aerial, HE (High Explosive), 2.75 inch

=== Aircraft weapons ===
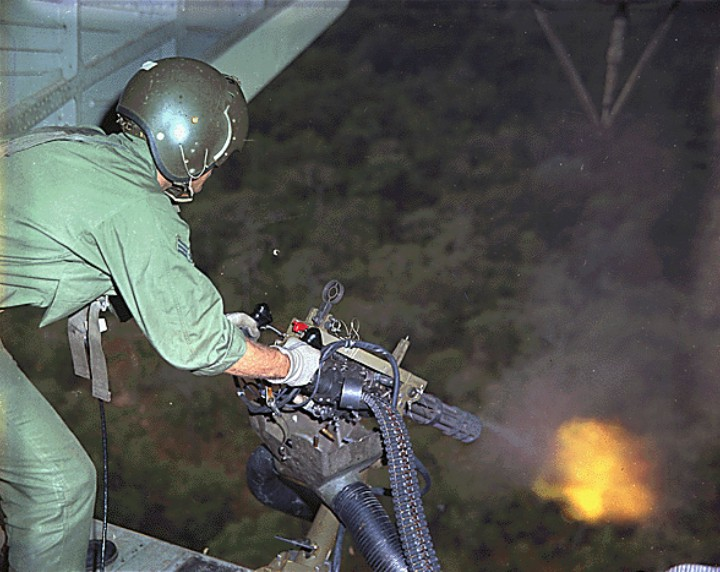
A minigun being fired from a combat search and rescue helicopter in Vietnam

- M60D machine gun – 7.62mm (helicopter mount)
- Minigun – 7.62 mm (aircraft and helicopter mount)
- Colt Mk 12 cannon – 20 mm (aircraft mount)
- M3 cannon – 20 mm (aircraft mount)
- M39 cannon – 20 mm (aircraft mount)
- M61 Vulcan – 20 mm (aircraft mount), M195 was used on AH-1
- M197 Gatling gun – 20 mm (used on AH-1J helicopters)
- M75 grenade launcher – 40 mm (helicopter mount)
- M129 grenade launcher – 40 mm (helicopter mount)
- AIM-4 Falcon
- AIM-7 Sparrow
- AIM-9 Sidewinder
- AGM-12 Bullpup
- AGM-22
- AGM-45 Shrike
- AGM-62 Walleye
- AGM-78 Standard ARM
- AGM-65 Maverick

=== Chemical weapons ===
- Rainbow Herbicides
- Agent Orange – While developed to be used as a herbicide to destroy natural obstacles and tree camouflage, it was later revealed that it posed health risks to those exposed to it.
- Agent Blue – Used to destroy agricultural land that was believed to be used to grow food for the VC/NVA.
- Agent Green
- Agent White
- Napalm
- CS-1 riot control agent – "Teargas", used in grenades, cluster bomblets or (rarely) shells.
- CN gas – "teargas"

=== Vehicles ===
In addition to cargo-carrying and troop transport roles, many of these vehicles were also equipped with weapons and sometimes armor, serving as "gun trucks" for convoy escort duties.

- M274 Truck, Platform, Utility, 1/2 Ton, 4X4 – Commonly called a "Mechanical Mule".
- Land Rover (short and long wheelbase) – Australian and New Zealand forces.
- CJ-3B and M606 – 1/4 ton jeep
- M151 – ¼ ton jeep.
- Dodge M37 – 3/4 ton truck.
- M76 Otter – 1¼-ton amphibious cargo carrier used by USMC.
- M116 Husky – 1¼-ton amphibious cargo carrier, tested by USMC.
- M733 – 1¼-ton amphibious personnel carrier, M116 variant, tested by USMC.
- M35 series 2½-ton 6x6 cargo truck
- M135 2½-ton truck
- M54 5-ton 6x6 truck
- M548 – 6-ton tracked cargo carrier
- M520 Goer – 4x4 8-ton cargo truck.
- M123 and M125 10-ton 6x6 trucks

==== Other vehicles ====
- Caterpillar D7E bulldozer – used by US Army
- Various graders and bulldozers used by the USMC
- ERDLator

=== Combat vehicles ===
==== Tanks ====
- M24 Chaffee – light tank; main ARVN tank early in the war, used at least as late as the Tet Offensive.
- M41A3 Walker Bulldog – light tank, replaced the M24 Chaffee as the main ARVN tank from 1965.
- M48 Patton – main tank of the US Army and Marines throughout the war, and also used by ARVN forces from 1971.
- M67 "Zippo" – flamethrower variant of the M48 Patton, used by USMC.
- M551 Sheridan – Armored Reconnaissance Airborne Assault Vehicle/Light Tank, used by the US Army from 1969.
- Centurion Mk 5 Main Battle Tank – used by the Australian Army, with AVLB and ARV variants.

==== Other armored vehicles ====
- C15TA Armoured Truck – used by the ARVN early in the war
- LVTP5 (aka AMTRACs) – amphibious tractors/landing craft used by USMC and later by RVNMD
- Lynx Scout Car Mk II – used by the ARVN
- M59 – APC (Armored Personnel Carrier)
- M113 – APC (Armored Personnel Carrier)
- M113 ACAV – Armored Cavalry Assault Vehicle
- M163 Vulcan – self-propelled anti-aircraft tank
- M114 – reconnaissance vehicle
- M132 armored flamethrower
- M106 mortar carrier
- M3 Scout Car – used by South Vietnamese forces early in the war.
- M3 half-track – used by South Vietnamese forces early in the war.
- Cadillac Gage V-100 Commando – replaced ARVN M8 armored cars in 1967. Also used by US forces as M706 Commando.
- M8 Greyhound – used by ARVN forces early in the war.
- M56 Scorpion – limited use in 1965–1966
- M50 Ontos – self-propelled 106 mm recoilless rifle carrier used by the USMC until 1969.
- M42 Duster – M41 based hull, with a twin 40 mm antiaircraft gun mounted on an open turret
- M728 Combat Engineer Vehicle – modified M60 Patton tank equipped with dozer blade, short-barrelled 165 mm M135 Demolition Gun, and A-Frame crane.
- M60 AVLB – armored vehicle launched bridge using M60 Patton chassis.
- M51 armored recovery vehicle – fielded by US Marines.
- M578 light recovery vehicle
- M88 recovery vehicle – armored recovery vehicle based on M48 chassis.
- Wickums armored draisine used by the ARVN.

=== Naval craft ===
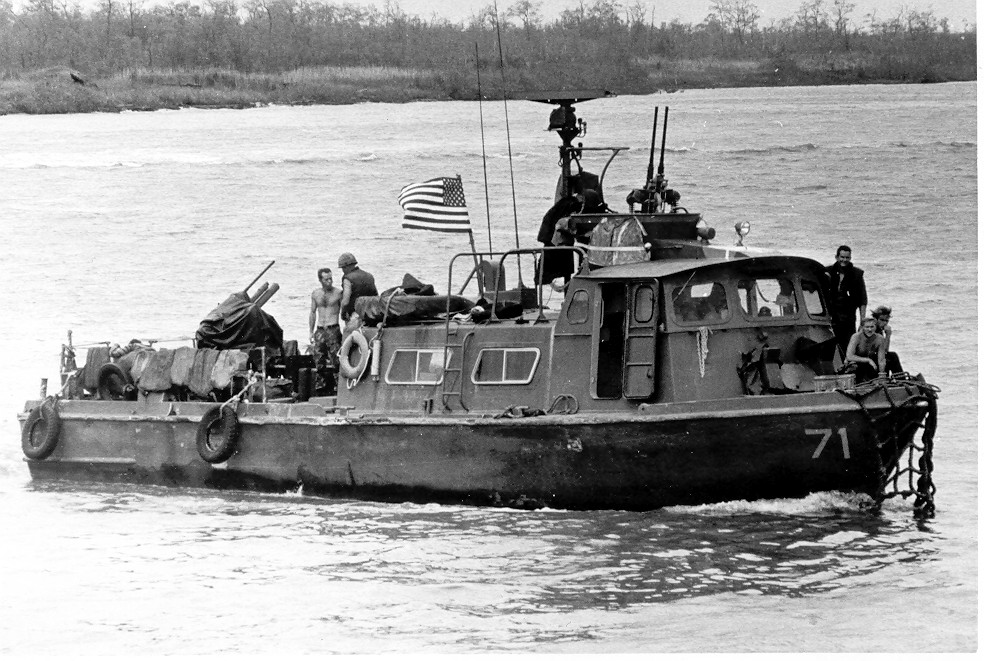
Fast Patrol Craft

- LCM-6 and LCM-8 – with several modifications:
  - LCMs modified as a river monitors
  - Armored Troop Carrier
  - Command and Communication Boat (CCB)
  - other variants included helipad boats and tankers
- LCVP – Landing craft vehicle personnel, some made by the French Services Techniques des Construction et Armes Navales/France Outremer and known as FOM
- Swift Boat – Patrol Craft Fast (PCF)
- ASPB – assault support patrol boat
- PBR – Patrol Boat River, all-fiberglass boats propelled by twin water jets, used by the US Navy
- Hurricane Aircat – airboat used by ARVN and US Army

=== Communications ===
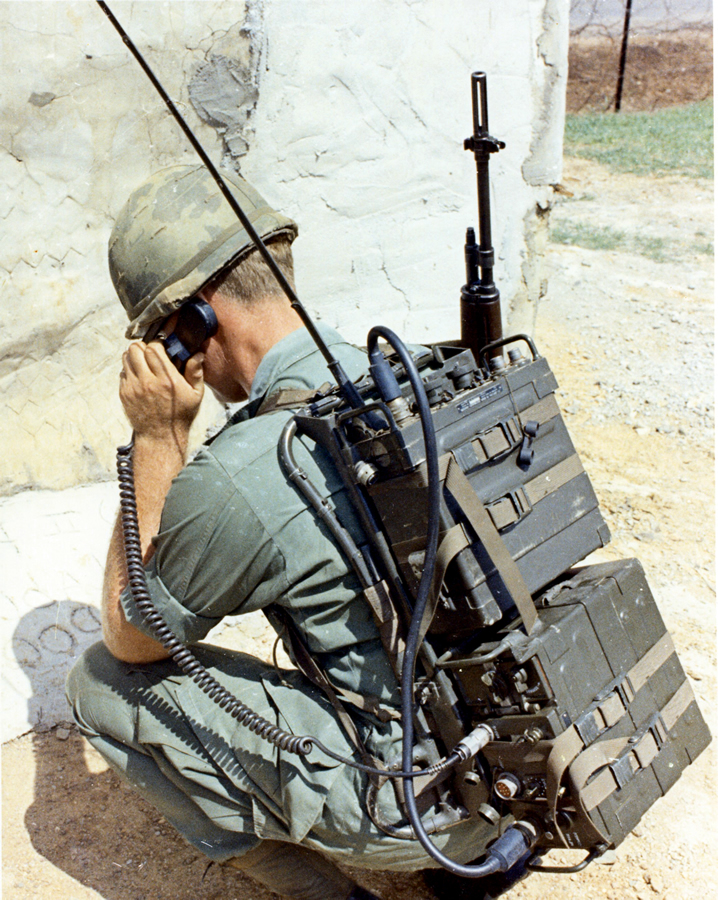
American soldier using the KY-38 "man-pack", part of the NESTOR voice encryption system that was used during the Vietnam War. The upper unit is an AN/PRC-77 radio transceiver. The combined weight of the units, 54 pounds (24.5 kg), proved an obstacle to their use in combat.

==== Radios ====
The geographically dispersed nature of the war challenged existing military communications. From 1965 to the final redeployment of tactical units, numerous communications-electronics systems were introduced in Vietnam to upgrade the quality and quantity of tactical communications and replace obsolete gear:

- AN/PRT-4 and PRR-9 squad radios – replaced the AN/PRC-6.
- AN/PRC-6 and AN/PRC-10 – older short range radios, used for outposts
- AN/PRC-25 and 77 – short-range FM radios that replaced the AN/PRC-8-10.
- AN/VRC-12 series (VRC-43, VRC-45, VRC-46, VRC-47, VRC-48) – FM radios that replaced the RT-66-67-68/GRC (including AN/GRC 3–8, VRC 7–10, VRC 20–22, and VRQ 1–3 sets).
- AN/GRC-106 – AM radios and teletypewriter that replaced the AN/GRC-19.
- TA-312 and TA-1 field telephones.

==== Encryption systems ====
Encryption systems developed by the National Security Agency and used in Vietnam included:

- NESTOR – tactical secure voice system, including the TSEC/KY-8, 28 and 38 was used with the PRC-77 and VRC-12
- KW-26 – protected higher level teletype traffic
- KW-37 – protected the U.S. Navy fleet broadcast
- KL-7 – provided offline security
- A number of paper encryption and authentication products, including one time pads and the KAL-55B Tactical Authentication System

== Weapons of the PAVN/VC, China, Soviet and North Korea Forces ==
The PAVN and the Southern communist guerrillas, the Viet Cong (VC) as they were commonly referred to during the war, largely used standard Warsaw Pact weapons. Weapons used by the PAVN also included Chinese Communist variants, which were referred to as CHICOM's by the US military. Captured weapons were also widely used; almost every small arm used by SEATO may have seen limited enemy use. During the early 1950s, US equipment captured in Korea was also sent to the Viet Minh.

=== Small arms ===
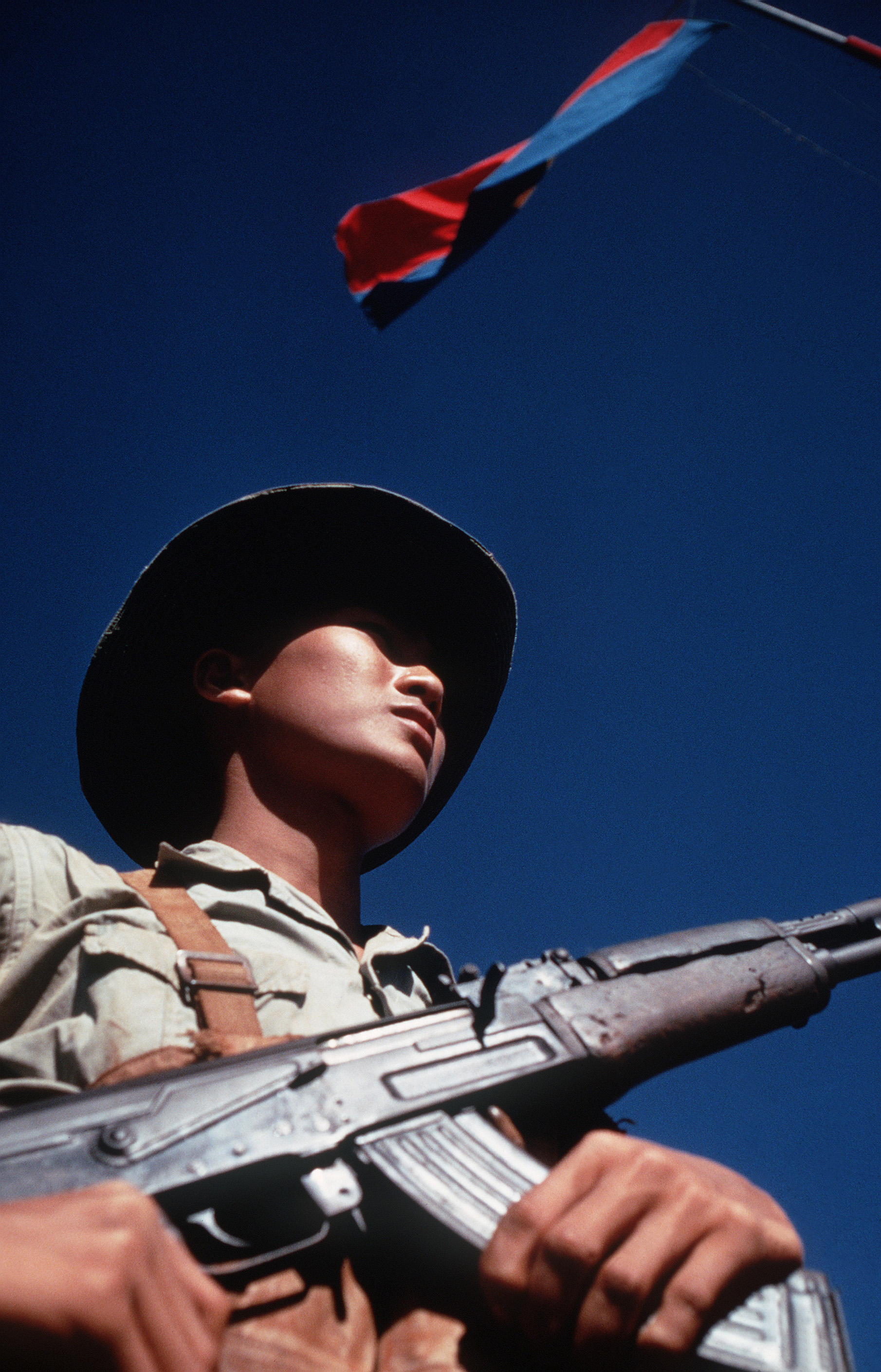
Viet Cong guerrilla stands beneath a Viet Cong flag carrying an AK-47 rifle.

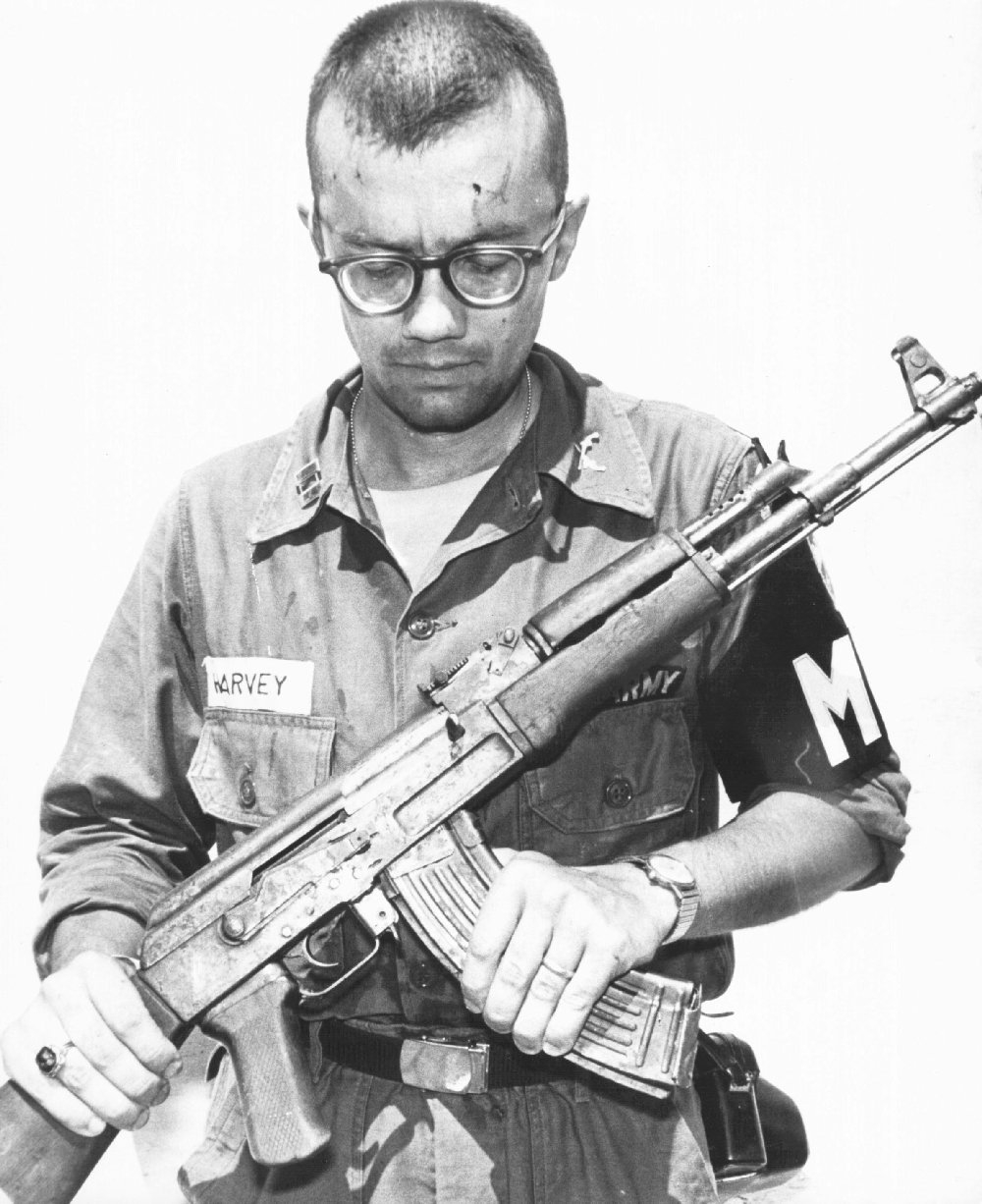
A U.S. Army M.P. inspects a Soviet AK-47 recovered in Vietnam in 1968.

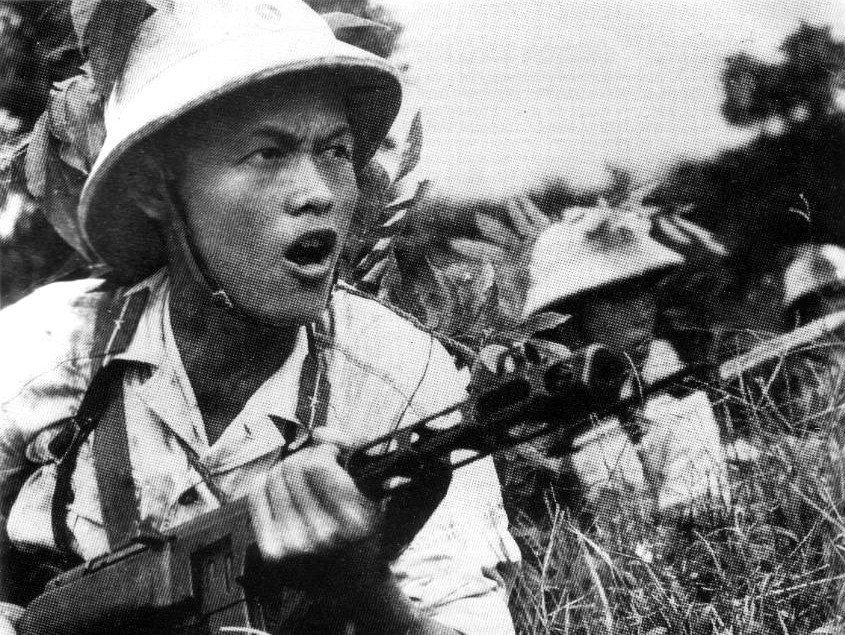
PAVN troops with PPSh-41

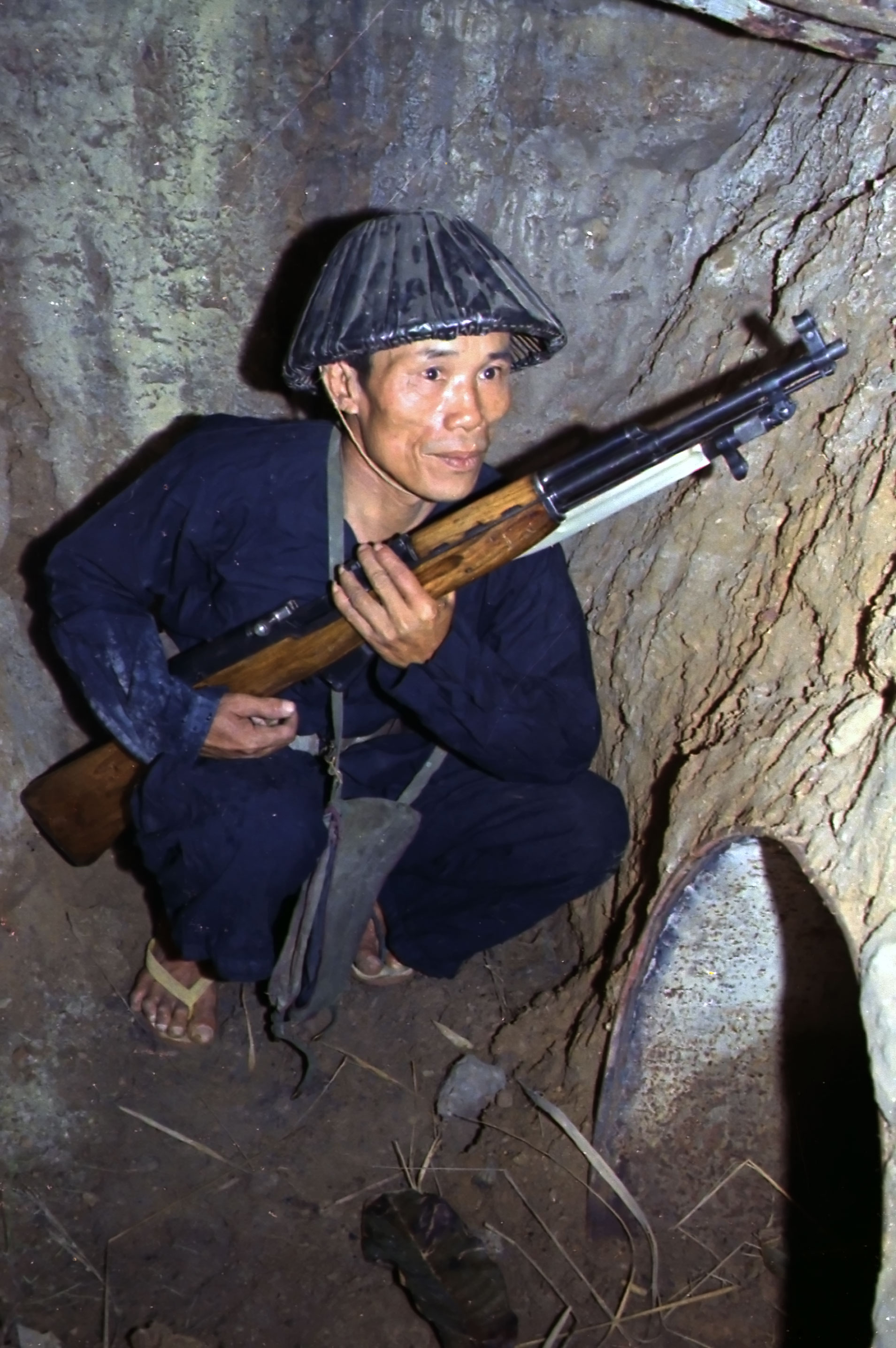
VC soldier with SKS

==== Hand combat weapons ====
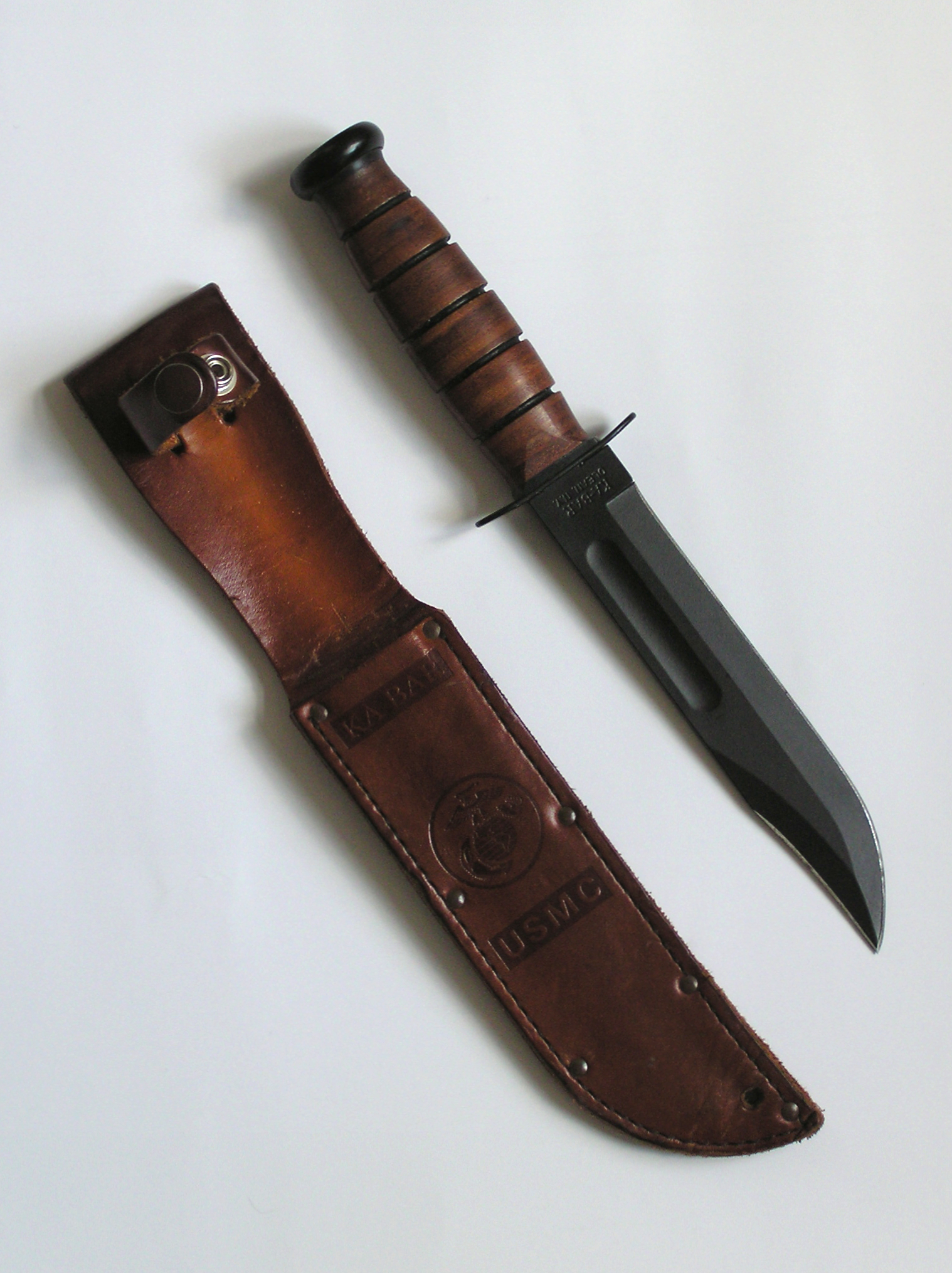
The Ka-Bar knife was also used by the PAVN & Viet Cong

- A wide variety of bayonets meant for fitting on the many types of rifles used by the NVA and VC.
- Type 30 bayonet
- Spears, used during "suicide attacks"

==== Handguns and revolvers ====
- Makarov PM (and Chinese Type 59)
- Mauser C96 – Locally produced copies were used alongside Chinese copies and German variants supplied by the Soviets.
- Nagant M1895
- M1911 pistol
- M1935A pistol
- SA vz. 61 – automatic pistol, mainly issued to special forces as the K61l
- Tokarev TT-33 – Standard pistol, including Chinese Type 51 and Type 54 copies including Zastava M57
- Walther P38 – Captured by the Soviets during World War II and provided to the VPA and the NLF as military aid
- Home-made pistols, such as copies of the M1911, Luger or of the Mauser C96 (Cao Dai 763) or crude one-shot guns, were also used by the Viet Cong early in the war.

==== Automatic and semi-automatic rifles ====
- SKS (Chinese Type 56) semi-automatic carbine
- AK-47 – from the Soviet Union, Warsaw Pact countries, China and North Korea
  - Type 56 – Chinese-made standard rifle
  - Type 58 – Limited use from North Korea
  - PMK – Polish-made AK-47
- AKM – from the Soviet Union, common modernized variant of the AK-47
  - PM md. 63/65 – Romanian variant of AKM
  - AMD-65 – Very limited use from Hungary
- M1/M2 carbines – common and popular captured semi-automatic rifles
- M1 Garand — Captured from South Vietnamese forces
- vz. 52 rifle semi-automatic rifle, very rarely used
- Vz. 58 assault rifle
- Sturmgewehr 44 — Limited
- Type 63 assault rifle – Limited use, received during the 1970s
- M14, M16A1 – captured from US and South Vietnamese forces.
- MAS-49 rifle – captured French rifle from First Indochina War

==== Rifles: bolt-action, marksman ====
- Arisaka rifles – Used by Viet Cong early in the war.
- Berthier rifles- Used by Viet Cong early in the war
- Chiang Kai-shek rifle – Used by recruits and militias
- Mosin–Nagant – Bolt-action rifles and carbines from the Soviet Union and China (especially M44).
- Mauser Kar98k – Bolt-action rifle, captured from the French during the First Indochina War and also provided by the Soviets as military aid.
- MAS-36 rifle
- Lee–Enfield – Used by the Viet Cong
- Lebel rifle – Used earlier in the war.
- M1903 Springfield – Used by Viet Cong forces
- M1917 Enfield – Used by Viet Cong forces
- SVD Dragunov – Soviet semi-automatic sniper rifle in limited use
- vz. 24 – Used by Viet Cong forces.
- Older or rarer rifles were often modified by the Viet Cong early in the war: Gras mle 1874 carbines were rechambered to .410 bore while Destroyer carbines were modified to accept the magazine of the Walther P38.
- Home-made rifles, often spring-action rifles made to look like a M1 Garand or a M1 Carbine, were also used by the Viet Cong.

==== Submachine guns ====
- K-50M submachine gun (Vietnamese edition, based on Chinese version of Russian PPSh-41, under licence)
- MAT-49 submachine gun – Captured during the French-Indochina War. Many were converted from 9×19mm to 7.62×25mm Tokarev
- PPSh-41 submachine gun (both Soviet, North Korean and Chinese versions)
- PPS-43 submachine gun (both Soviet and Chinese versions)
- M3 submachine gun Limited use
- Thompson submachine gun – including Vietnamese copies
- MP 40 Provided by the Soviet Union as a military aid.
- Smith and Wesson M76 submachine gun - captured from US forces
- MAS-38 submachine gun – Captured from the French in the Indochina War.
- PM-63 submachine gun – Used by tank crews
- M56 submachine gun – limited use, received from Yugoslavia
- Madsen M-50 – Small numbers captured from US and ARVN forces
- Type 64 submachine gun – Small numbers received, issued to armed police as the K64.
- Vietnamese home-made submachine guns, inspired by the Sten or the Thompson, were used by the Viet Cong early in the war.

==== Shotguns ====
- Homemade shotguns, some inspired by the BAR or the Arisaka Type 99, were used by the Viet Cong early in the war.
- Various models captured from ARVN and US forces
- Remington Model 10 – pump-action shotgun used by the Viet Cong

==== Machine guns ====
- Bren light machine gun, used by Viet Cong
- Degtyarev DP (DPM and RP-46 variants and Chinese Type 53 and Type 58 copies)
- DShK heavy machine gun (including Chinese Type 54)
- FM-24/29 – used by Viet Cong Forces
- KPV heavy machine gun
- Lewis gun
- M1918 Browning Automatic Rifle
- M1917 Browning machine gun – captured from ARVN/US forces
- M1919 Browning machine gun – captured from ARVN/US forces
- M60 machine gun – captured from ARVN/US forces
- M2 Browning – captured from ARVN/US forces
- MG 34 – captured by the Soviets during World War II and provided to the VPA and the NLF as military aid
- Maxim machine-gun M1910
- PK Very limited use general-purpose machine gun from Soviet Union
- Reibel Machine gun
- RPD light machine gun (and Chinese Type 56 and North Korean Type 62 copies) – first used in 1964
- RPK light machine gun of Soviet design
- SG-43/SGM medium machine guns including Type 53 and Type 57 Chinese copies of these guns
- Type 11 light machine gun
- Type 24 machine gun (Chinese-made MG-08) – used by the Viet Cong Forces
- Type 67 machine gun
- Type 92 heavy machine gun
- Type 99 light machine gun
- Uk vz. 59 general-purpose machine gun
- ZB vz. 26 light machine gun (included Chinese copies)

==== Grenades, mines, and booby traps ====
- Home-made grenades and IEDs
- F1 grenade (Chinese Type 1)
- M29 grenade – captured
- M79 grenade launcher – captured from US or ARVN forces
- RG-42 grenade (Chinese Type 42)
- RGD-1 and RGD-2 smoke grenades
- RGD-5 grenade (Chinese Type 59)
- RKG-3 anti-tank grenade (Chinese Type 3)
- Type 67 and RGD-33 stick grenades
- Type 64 rifle grenade – fired from AT-44 grenade launchers, fitted to Mosin-Nagant carbines
- Type 89 grenade discharger

==== Flamethrowers ====
- LPO-50 flamethrower
  - Type 74 Chinese-built copy

==== Rocket launchers, recoilless rifles, anti-tank rifles and lightweight guided missiles ====
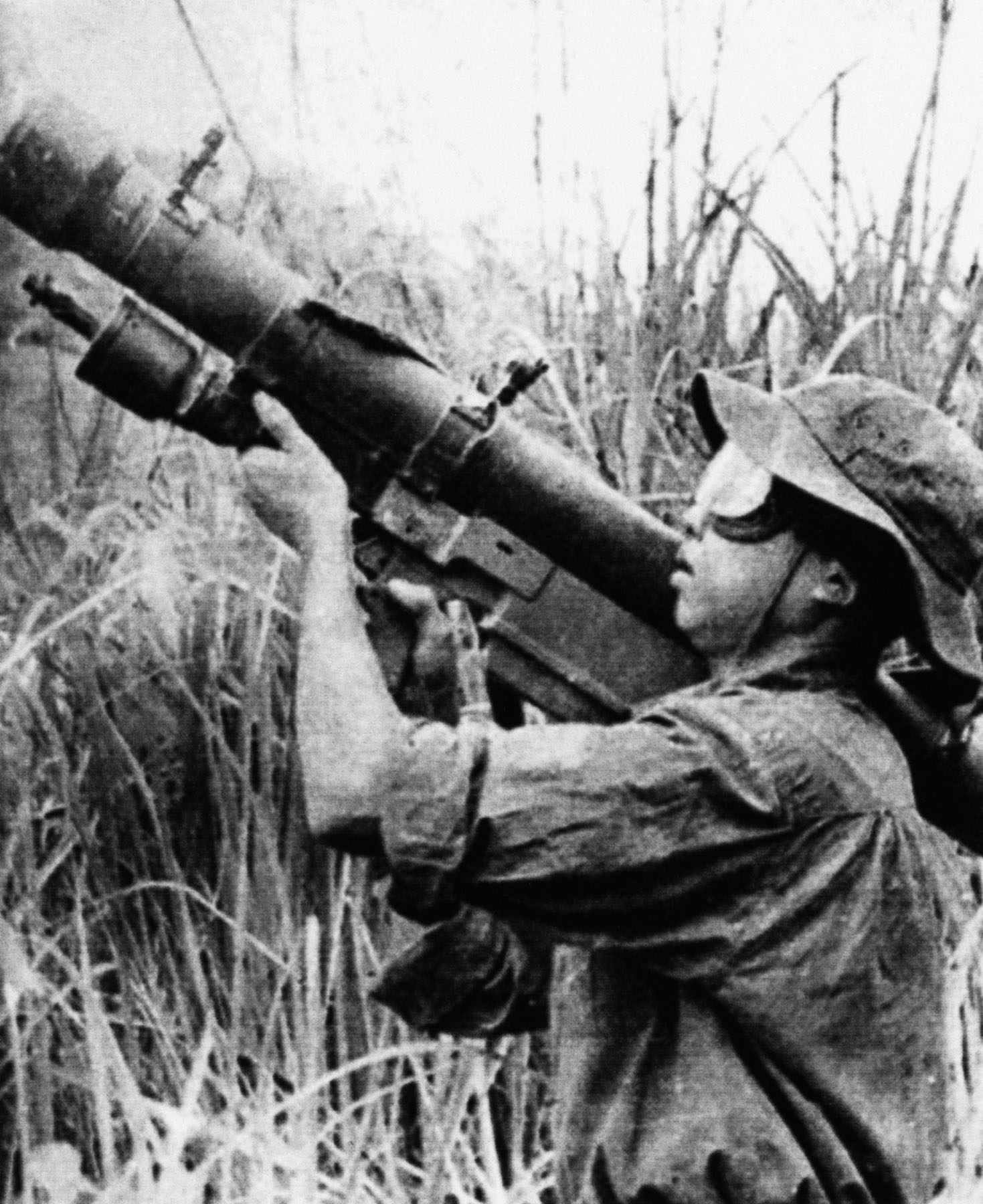
North Vietnamese soldier preparing to fire an SA-7

- Recoilless rifles were known as DKZ (Đại-bác Không Giật).
- RPG-2 recoilless rocket launcher (both Soviet, Chinese and locally produced B-40 and B-50 variants used)
- RPG-7 recoilless rocket launcher
- Type 51 (Chinese copy of the M20 Super Bazooka) – used by Viet Cong as late as 1964
- B-10 recoilless rifle
- B-11 recoilless rifle
- SPG-9 73 mm recoilless rifle
- M18 recoilless rifle (and Chinese Type 36 copy) and captured from US or ARVN forces
- M20 recoilless rifle (and Chinese Type 52 and Type 56 copies) and captured from US or ARVN forces
- PTRD Limited use by the Viet Cong Forces.
- 9K32 Strela-2 (SA-7) anti-aircraft weapon
- 9M14 Malyutka (AT-3 Sagger)

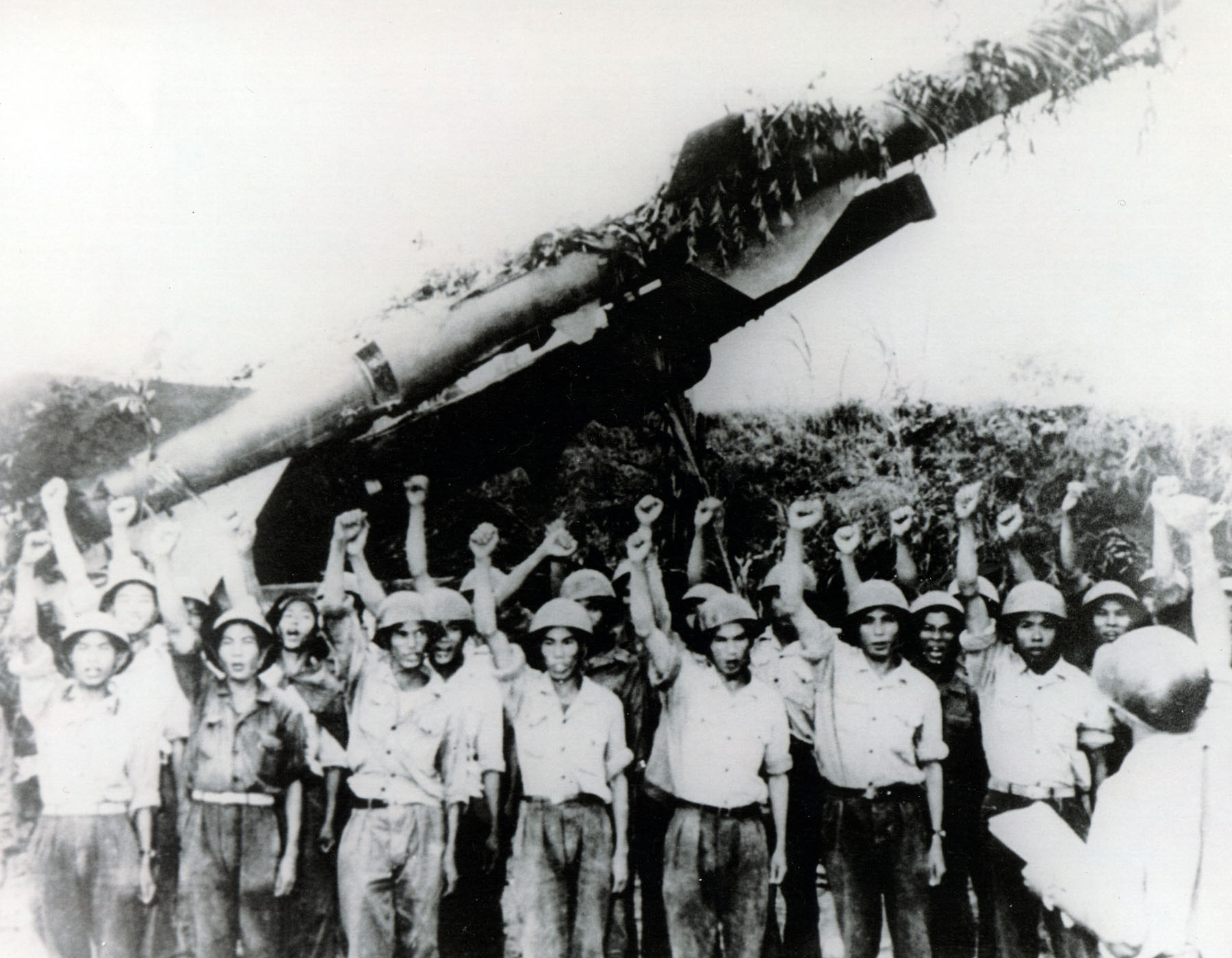
North Vietnamese SAM crew in front of a SA-2 launcher

=== Mortars ===
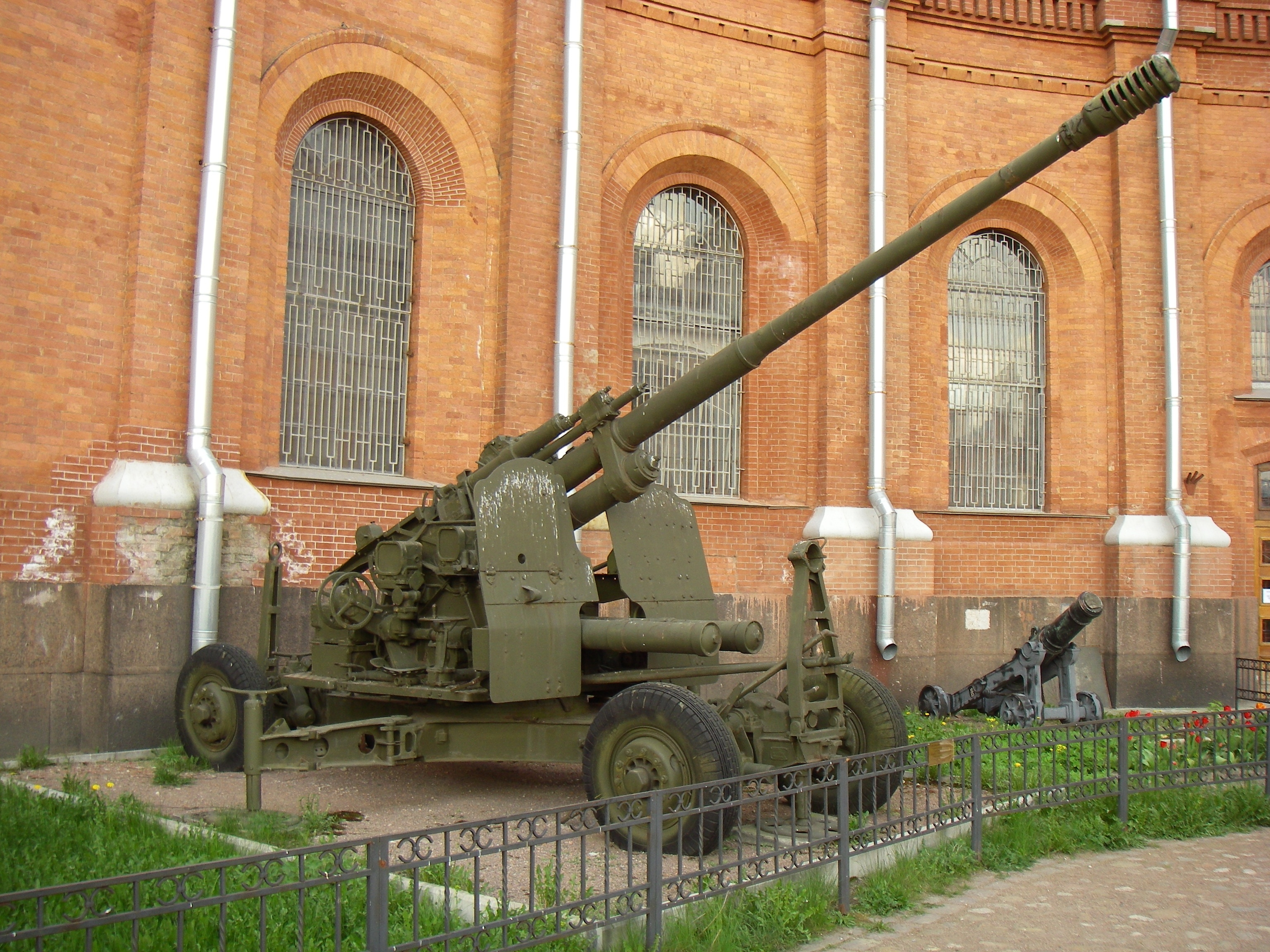
The KS-19

- Brandt Mle 1935 – 60 mm mortar
- M2 mortar (including Chinese Type 31 and Type 63 copies) – 60 mm mortars
- M19 mortar – 60 mm mortar
- M1 mortar – 81 mm
- M29 mortar – 81 mm
- Brandt Mle 27/31 – 81 mm mortar
- 82-PM-37 (including Chinese Type 53 copy) – 82 mm mortar
- Type 67 mortar – 82 mm mortar
- M1938 107 mm mortar
- 120-PM-43 mortar
- M1943 160 mm mortar (including Chinese Type 55 copy)

=== Field artillery rocket launchers ===
Field artillery rockets were often fired from improvised launchers, sometimes a tube fixed with bamboo.

- 102 mm 102A3 rockets
- 107 mm Type 63 MRL – used with one-tube or 12-tube launchers
- single-tube 122mm 9M22M rocket taken from BM-21 Grad MRL
- single-tube 140mm M14-OF rocket taken from BM-14 MRL

=== Field guns and howitzers ===
- 57 mm anti-tank gun M1943 (ZiS-2)
- 70 mm Type 92 battalion gun
- Type 41 75 mm mountain gun, supplied by China
- 7.5 cm Pak 40
- 75 mm M116 pack howitzer, supplied by China
- 76 mm divisional gun M1942 (ZiS-3) (and Chinese Type 54)
- 85 mm divisional gun D-44
- 100 mm field gun M1944 (BS-3)
- Type 91 10 cm howitzer, supplied by China
- M101 howitzer
- 122 mm gun M1931/37 (A-19)
- 122 mm howitzer M1938 (M-30)
- D-74 122 mm field gun
- 130 mm towed field gun M1954 (M-46)
- 152 mm howitzer-gun M1937 (ML-20)
- 152 mm towed gun-howitzer M1955 (D-20)
- M114 155 mm howitzer

=== Anti-aircraft weapons ===
- ZPU-1/2/4 single, double, and quad 14.5 mm anti-aircraft machine guns
- ZU-23 twin 23 mm anti-aircraft cannon
- M1939 37 mm anti-aircraft gun (and Chinese Type 55)
- S-60 57 mm anti-aircraft gun
- 85 mm air defense gun M1944
- 100 mm air defense gun KS-19
- 8.8 cm Flak 18/36/37/41
- S-75 Dvina Soviet high-altitude air defence system
- S-125 Neva Soviet high-altitude air defence system

=== Aircraft ===
- Aero Ae-45 trainer aircraft
- Aero L-29 Delfín trainer aircraft
- An-2 utility aircraft
- Cessna A-37 Dragonfly attack aircraft – limited use of captured or defected
- Ilyushin Il-12 transport aircraft
- Ilyushin Il-14 transport aircraft
- Ilyushin Il-28 jet bomber
- Lisunov Li-2 transport aircraft
- Mikoyan-Gurevich MiG-15 (and Chinese F-4) jet trainer
- MiG-17 jet fighter
- MiG-19 jet fighter
- MiG-21 jet fighter
- North American T-28 Trojan – 1 ex-Laotian used in 1964
- Shenyang J-5 jet fighter
- Shenyang J-6 jet fighter
- Yakovlev Yak-18 trainer aircraft

=== Aircraft weapons ===
- Gryazev-Shipunov GSh-23
- Nudelman-Rikhter NR-30
- Nudelman N-37
- Nudelman-Rikhter NR-23
- K-5 (missile) (RS-2US)
- K-13 (missile) (R-3S)

=== Helicopters ===
- Mi-4
- Mi-6
- Mi-8

=== Tanks ===
- M24 Chaffee – light tank, captured from the French and used for training early in the war
- M41 Walker Bulldog – light tank, captured from the ARVN.
- M48 Patton – captured from the ARVN.
- PT-76 amphibious tank
- SU-76 self-propelled gun
- SU-100 self-propelled guns in limited numbers.
- SU-122 self-propelled gun in limited numbers
- T-34-85 medium tank, from 1959
- T-54 main battle tanks, used from 1965
- Type 59 main battle tanks
- Type 63 amphibious tank
- ZSU-57-2 anti-aircraft self-propelled systems
- ZSU-23-4 anti-aircraft self-propelled systems

=== Other armored vehicles ===
- BTR-40 APC
- BTR-50 APC
- BTR-60PB APC
- BTR-152 APC
- M3 half-track and M8 light armored car – first NVA armored vehicles. Used to protect air bases in the North.
- M113 armored personnel carrier – captured from the ARVN
- MTU-20 armored bridge-layer
- Type 63 APC

=== Support vehicles ===
- AT-L light artillery tractor
- AT-S and ATS-59 medium artillery tractors
- Beijing BJ212
- GAZ-46 light amphibious car
- GAZ-51 truck (and Chinese copy)
- GAZ-63 truck
- GAZ-69
- IFA W 50
- Jiefang CA-10 trucks
- Jiefang CA-30 trucks
- KrAZ-255 heavy truck
- Mazur D-350 artillery tractor
- MAZ-502 truck
- M35 truck series (captured)
- M54 truck series (captured)
- M151 jeep (captured)
- ZIS-150 trucks
- UralZIS-355M truck
- ZIL-130 truck
- ZIL-151 truck
- ZIL-157 and ZIL-157K trucks
- ZiS-485 amphibious vehicle

=== Naval craft ===
- Swatow-class gunboats
- P4 and P6 torpedo boats
- Hainan class submarine chaser
- T43-class minesweeper
- Kronshtadt-class submarine chaser
- Countless civilian-type sampans – mainly used for smuggling supplies and weapons

== See also ==
- NLF and PAVN strategy, organization and structure
- NLF and PAVN logistics and equipment
- NLF and PAVN battle tactics
- Weapons of the Laotian Civil War
- Weapons of the Cambodian Civil War
- Weapons of the First Indochina War
