= Dilagrama m/65 =

- Type: Grenade launcher device
- Place of origin: Portugal

Service history
- In service: 1965-1990s
- Used by: Portugal
- Wars: Portuguese Colonial War

The Dilagrama m/65 (Portuguese for acronym: Dispositivo de lançamento de granadas de mão - modelo de 1965; English translation: "Device for Launching Handgrenades - Model of 1965") is a device employed by the Portuguese Army that fits G3 Automatic Rifles allowing them to launch defensive Type m/63 hand grenades further than they can be thrown by hand.

The Dilagrama basically consists of a grenade adapter that fits the barrel of the G3. It is based on the US military's M1A2 Grenade Adapter, a modified M1 Grenade Adapter used with the M26-series Defensive Grenade. The adapter consists of a 3-pronged bracket for holding and securing the grenade (with the lever held down by a breakaway safety tab on the third prong), the tubular body for fitting to the launcher, and the tailfin assembly. The Dilagrama is launched with the use of special blank ammunition. The safety tab holding the grenade's arming lever breaks away when launched, arming the grenade in mid-air. Depending on the range, the grenade will then either air-burst over the target or impact and then detonate.

== Use in Combat ==
The Dilagrama was developed for the Portuguese Army in the 1960s for use in the Colonial Wars (1961–1974) in their possessions in Africa. Each grupo de combate (Platoon) usually fielded two soldiers armed with Dilagramas.

== See also ==
- Rifle grenade
