= M17 rifle grenade =

Rifle grenade used by the United States in World War II

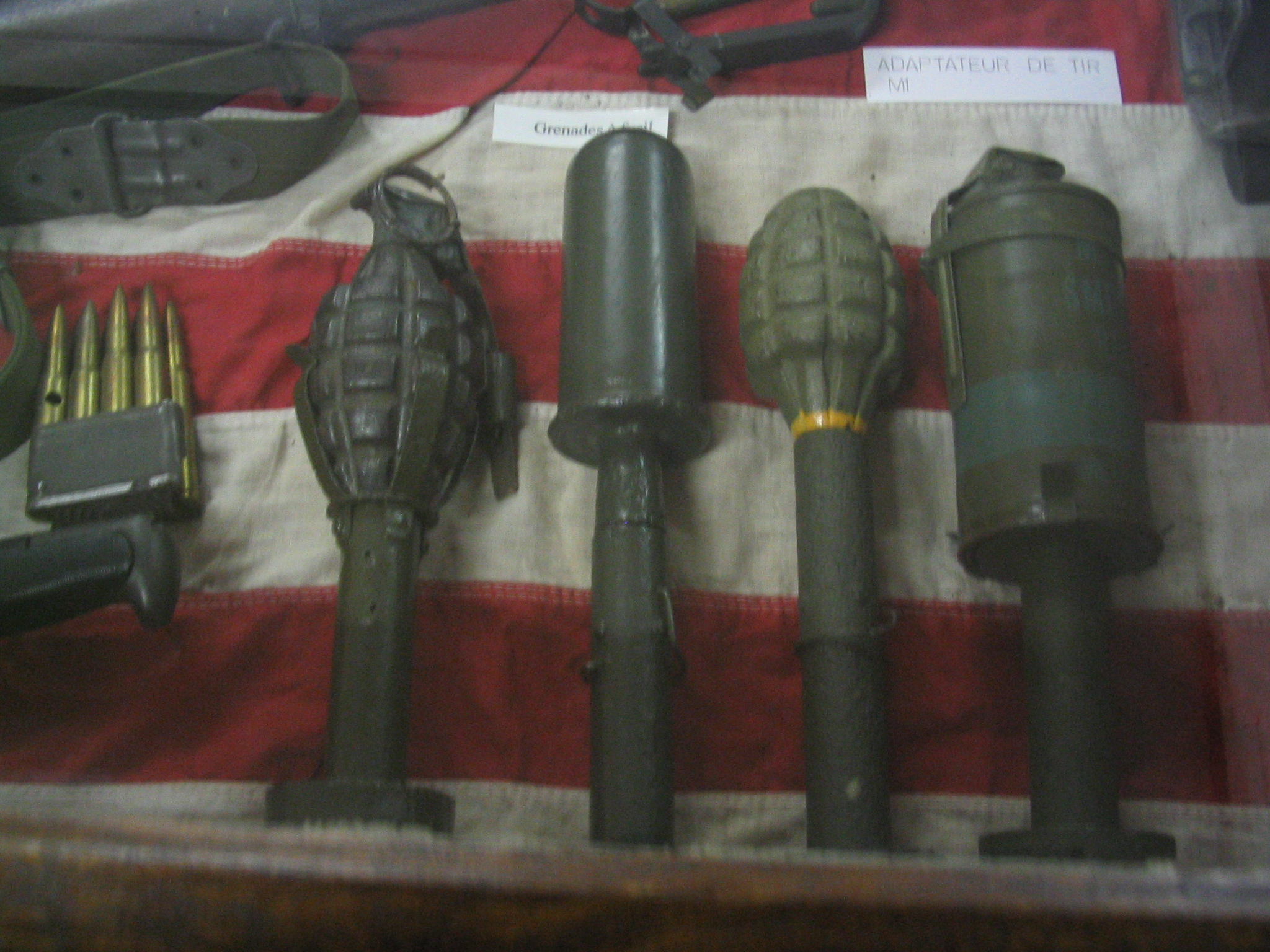
- The M17 is the third on the right
- Type: Impact-fused rifle grenade
- Place of origin: United States

Service history
- In service: 1943–1945
- Used by: United States
- Wars: World War II

Production history
- Produced: May–June 1943; March–April 1944
- No. built: ~325,000

Specifications
- Mass: 667 g (23.5 oz)
- Length: 248 mm (9.8 in)
- Diameter: 57 mm (2.2 in)
- Filling: TNT or EC powder
- Filling weight: 22 g (0.78 oz)
- Detonation mechanism: Impact fuze

The M17 (also known as the T2 grenade ) is a rifle grenade that was used by the United States during World War II.

== Description ==
"GRENADE, RIFLE, FRAGMENTATION, IMPACT, Ml7—

This grenade consists of a fin stabilizer assembly with impact type fuze similar to that used for Grenade, AT, M9Al. The head consists of a Mk. IIA1 hand grenade fuze body which is screwed in the fuze adapter on the stabilizer assembly. The Ml7 grenade is used in a manner identical with that of the Adapter, Grenade Projection, Ml, however, it offers a unit ready for firing without assembly in the field as is required for the Ml adapter"

WAR DEPARTMENT, INFANTRY FIELD MANUAL § WEAPON AND AMMUNITION TECHNICAL MANUAL, INFANTRY REGIMENT, PARACHUTE, June 1944, Page 43

== Firing ==
Once the warhead is screwed in, the M17 is fitted onto a grenade launcher adapter, such as the M7 grenade launcher. A special blank .30-06 cartridge is inserted into the rifle, then fired. The M17 will not explode if it lands on sand, water or mud; only solid ground will cause it to detonate.

== History ==
=== Adoption ===
The M17 was adopted in 1943. It was the United States' primary anti-personnel rifle grenade during the middle part of World War II.

=== Obsolescence ===
By the middle of 1944, the M17 had essentially been supplanted by the M1 Grenade Projection Adapter, which allowed a standard grenade to be converted into a rifle grenade.
