= M1 grenade adapter =

Expedient rifle grenade

The M1 grenade projection adapter was an expedient rifle grenade used by the American military in World War II, Korea, and Vietnam. It consisted of an add-on 22 mm (0.87 in) stabilizer tube and fins that converted a hand-grenade into a rifle grenade. It supplanted the M17 rifle grenade, and was eventually made obsolete by the 40 mm M79 grenade launcher.

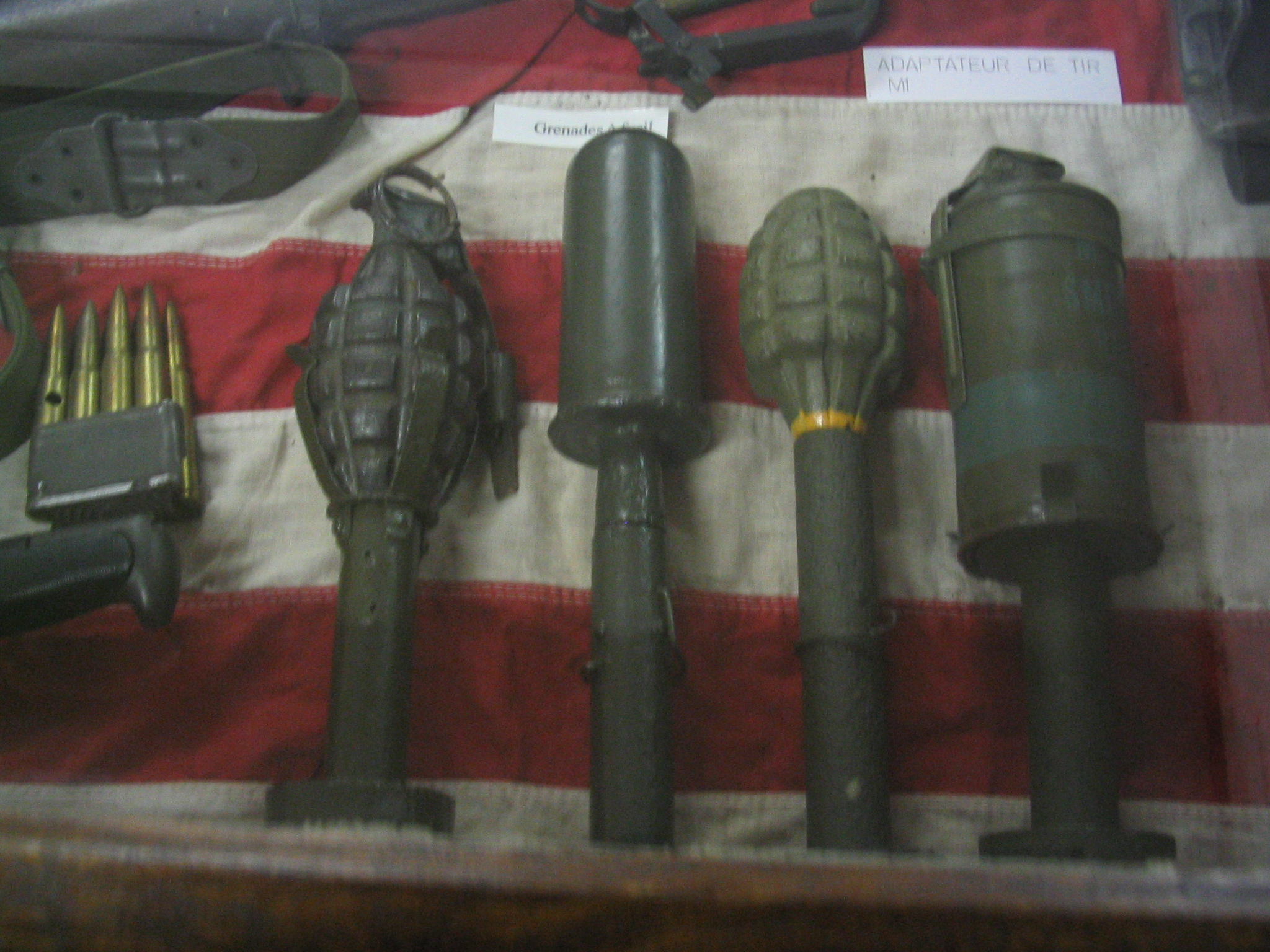
(From left to right): M1 grenade adapter with Mk.2 fragmentation grenade, M22 smoke rifle grenade with impact fuze (unknown smoke color), M17 fragmentation rifle grenade with impact-fuze, M2 grenade adapter with AN/M8 smoke grenade (red)

The M1 grenade projection adapter was designed to easily convert standard Mk 2 hand grenades into rifle grenades. This was done by inserting a Mk 2 grenade into the prongs while a holder on one of the prongs kept the arming lever from releasing. The unit was then placed on the 22 mm M7 grenade launcher attached to the M1 rifle's muzzle. The user then removed the grenade's safety pin and braced the rifle from a standing or kneeling position. The unit was launched by firing a high-powered blank from the rifle. Inertia caused the holder to shear off in flight, releasing the lever and arming the grenade. The grenade would then explode when its fuze ran out.

Although somewhat clumsy in appearance and operation, the M1 grenade projection adapter was well liked by the troops, who more often than not preferred it to the earlier M17 rifle grenade. The M17 would often fail to detonate if it impacted on sand, mud, or water; only solid ground would cause it to detonate.

== Range charts ==
The Springfield M1903 rifle used the M1 rifle grenade launcher and the Enfield M1917 rifle used the similar M2 rifle grenade launcher. They were designed to be used with bolt-action rifles. The M1 Garand rifle used the M7 rifle grenade launcher series and the M1 Carbine used the M8 rifle grenade launcher series. They were designed to be used with gas-operated semi-automatic rifles.

All four launchers had a series of six rings scored along the length of the launcher. These were used as a quick guide to indicate how deeply seated the rifle grenade was. The range and recoil increased, as the position numbers decreased. The first ring (position #6) was barely over the muzzle and the last ring (position #1) was almost at the base. "Full" meant it was fully seated at the base of the launcher. The M7 Auxiliary Grenade Cartridge was a booster charge that increased the maximum range of the rifle grenade.

Range Chart (Mk II Grenade w/ M1 Grenade Projection Adapter)
| Settings | | Range (Yards) | | |
| Angle of Elevation | Position on Launcher | M1903 with M1 | M1 Garand with M7 | M1 Carbine with M8 |
|---|---|---|---|---|
| 45° | 6 | X | 60 yd (55 m) | 35 yd (32 m) |
| 45° | 5 | 60 yd (55 m) | 80 yd (73 m) | 50 yd (46 m) |
| 45° | 4 | 105 yd (96 m) | 65 yd (59 m) | |
| 45° | 3 | 105 yd (96 m) | 130 yd (120 m) | 85 yd (78 m) |
| 45° | 2 | N/A | N/A | 100 yd (91 m) |
| 45° | 1 | N/A | N/A | 115 yd (105 m) |
| 45° | Full | N/A | N/A | 130 yd (120 m) |
| 30° | 2 | 115 yd (105 m) | 140 yd (130 m) | 90 yd (82 m) |
| 30° | 1 | 140 yd (130 m) | 165 yd (151 m) | 105 yd (96 m) |
| 30° | Full | 175 yd (160 m) | 175 yd (160 m) | 115 yd (105 m) |
With M7 Auxiliary Grenade Cartridge
| 30° | Full | 225 yd (206 m) | 225 yd (206 m) | 170 yd (160 m) |

- The rifle grenade could be fired at an angle from the shoulder or braced under the arm at launcher positions 3 through 6 for direct-fire or close-range support (the lower the number, the greater the momentum and the harder the recoil). This was not done with the M7 auxiliary grenade cartridge fitted. This was due to the intense recoil it generated making it unsafe and easily capable of injuring the firer.
- X means unsafe. The range would be within the grenade's minimum effective range, potentially harming the firer and any friendly personnel nearby.
- N/A (not applicable) means ineffective and possibly unsafe. The grenade's fuze (4.0 to 4.8 seconds) would detonate in mid-flight before it reached its target. However, this "airburst" effect was unofficially used to hit targets behind cover or in trenches.

== Variants ==
- M1 - four prongs, no base cup, and solid or slotted tailfins. It was designed to launch the Mk 2 fragmentation grenade.
- M1A1 - three prongs, a base cup to secure the grenade, and solid tailfins. It was designed to launch oval-shaped grenades like the M26 fragmentation grenade.
- M1A2 = three prongs, a base cup to secure the grenade, and slotted tailfins. It was an improved version of the M1A1 with a reinforced tube and redesigned tailfins.

== Users ==
- Philippines - Used by the Philippine Army and Philippine Constabulary during World War II and post war era from 1942 to 1990s.
- Portugal - Portugal adopted a version of the M1A2 as the Dilagrama m/65 for use with the FN FAL and H&K G3 rifles. They did not need the grenade launcher bracket because it was built into the weapons' 22mm muzzle brakes as part of a NATO STANAG requirement.

== M2 grenade projection adapter ==
The M2 chemical grenade projection adapter was designed to launch cylindrical chemical grenades like smoke, white phosphorus, and tear gas. The chemical grenade was inserted into the short prongs on the base disc; a spring-loaded metal collar (called a "set-back band") slid over the middle kept the arming lever from releasing. The unit was then placed on the 22 mm M7 grenade launcher attached to the M1 rifle's muzzle. The user then removed the grenades safety pin and braced the rifle from a standing or kneeling position. The unit was launched by firing a high-powered blank from the rifle. The shock of firing causes the collar to slide off in flight, releasing the lever and arming the grenade.

=== Variants ===
- M2 = three short prongs, a base disc to secure the grenade, and solid tailfins
- M2A1 = three short prongs, a reinforced base disc to secure the grenade, and slotted tailfins
