= Sulu PNP Armoured Vehicle =

Philippine armoured vehicle

The Sulu PNP Armoured Vehicle was an armoured vehicle produced indigenously in the Philippines. There are photos of it in use by state military forces and irregular forces. Its exact history, design, and development are not known.

The vehicle is unusual in that it was used by the Philippine National Police the civilian national police force of the Republic of the Philippines, but only used on one Island. The name comes from the name of the Island, Sulu. The vehicle has no known official designation, so is generally known simple as the Sulu PNP Armoured vehicle, because of its use by the PNP on that Island.

== History ==
The history of its development and design is not known. The vehicle is an indigenous design of the Philippines. Many vehicles are created locally when other options are not available, so it is possibly it was designed and manufactured locally to fill a need that was otherwise not being met. The vehicle dates back at least to the mid-1970s, and photos indicate at least one of them was still being used in 2010.

== Design ==
There has been some debate over the makeup of this vehicle. Its exact origins, history and design are not known, and remain a mystery to military vehicle enthusiasts and scale military vehicle modellers. While it appears similar to an M3 scout car it would seem it is not, because of its height, and overall look. There is certainly no confirmation from any known source that is the same vehicle, or a modification of it. There have been some suggestions that it is built on the chassis and uses the engine of either a Japanese Commercial truck the Toyota FQ-15, or a Dodge M37 weapons carrier. The body of the vehicle is armour grade steel. The windshield is very similar to the White M3 scout car, so it is possible the M3 scout car windshield was used for it, or it is influenced by it. The vehicles were possibly composed of a number of vehicles, with the standard armoured chassis.

== Operational Use ==
Little is known of its use, although it has been used by the Police for some decades, and was still in use in 2010.

== Weapons ==
The vehicle has a front-mounted machine gun, mounted within a gun shield that can be swiveled. A mounting slot on both sides exist for a .50 cal machine gun to be mounted. Some examples have a gun shield, with a machine gun mounted in the back as well; this meant that the vehicle could have machine guns mounted and facing all four sides.
