= M52 =

M52, M/52 or M-52 may refer to:

== Military ==
- M/52 (rifle)
- M52 rifle grenade
- M52 self-propelled howitzer, a 1950s US 105 mm artillery
- MEMS M-52/60, a submachine gun
- Macchi M.52, a 1920s Italian racing seaplane
- Miles M.52, a 1942 British supersonic jet project
- Myasishchev M-52, the second prototype of a Soviet supersonic bomber

== Roads and transportation ==
- M52, The North/South Metroline in Amsterdam
- M52 (Cape Town), a Metropolitan Route in Cape Town, South Africa
- M52 (Johannesburg), a Metropolitan Route in Johannesburg, South Africa
- M-52 (Michigan highway)
- M52 highway (Russia)
- M52, a Metrobus route in Sydney, Australia

== Science and technology ==
- BMW M52, a 1994 automobile piston engine
- Messier 52, an open star cluster in the constellation Cassiopeia
- Samsung Galaxy M52 5G, an Android smartphone by Samsung Electronics.
