= Cashuat =

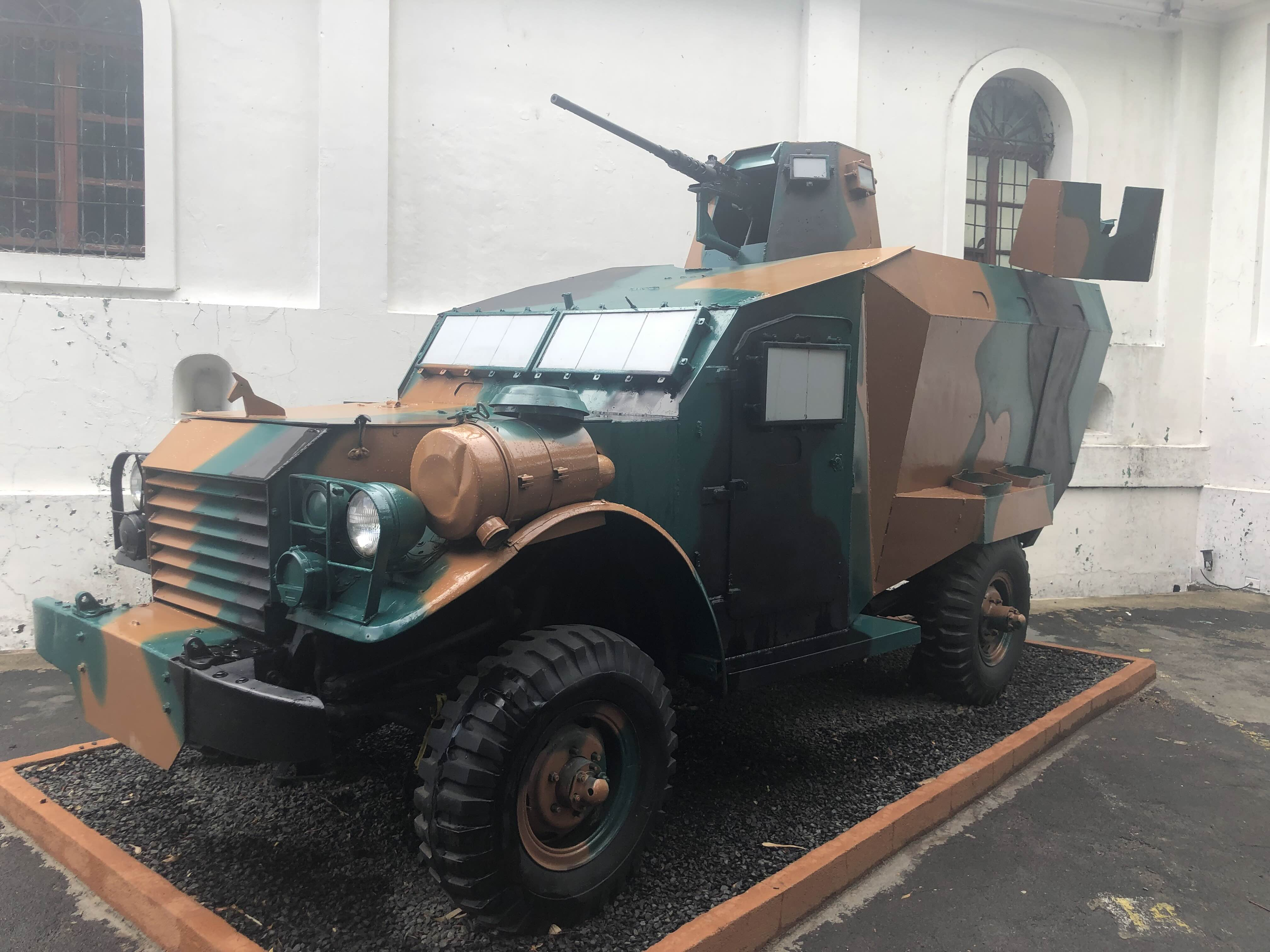
- A Cashuat at the Military Museum of El Salvador
- Type: Armoured personnel carrier
- Place of origin: El Salvador; United States

Service history
- In service: 1985-present
- Used by: Salvadoran Army
- Wars: Salvadoran Civil War

Production history
- Designed: 1984
- Produced: 1985
- No. built: 44
- Variants: M37

Specifications
- Crew: 3(+7 passengers)
- Main armament: .50 (12.7 mm) M2 HB
- Engine: diesel
- Suspension: 4x4
- Maximum speed: 90 km/h

The Cashuat is an armored personnel carrier produced in El Salvador, and based on the Dodge M37B1 ¾ ton (4×4) truck.

== History ==
The first military vehicle ever produced in El Salvador, the Cashuat was designed by Salvadoran Army Colonel Oswaldo Marenco Carballo (1955 - ) in 1984, with a prototype being built and trialed in-country in February 1985. During the trials, it was found that this particular prototype lacked sufficient ballistic protection, so the Salvadoran government sought assistance from the United States. Seeing that El Salvador didn't have manufacturing facilities capable of building the number of vehicles required, the US Army Tank Automotive Command's RDE Center's Design and Manufacturing Technology Directorate proposed a three-step plan to produce the vehicles:

1. A second, improved prototype would be built in Detroit, and sent to El Salvador to serve as a reference model.
2. The armor would be cut and welded in the United States, pre-assembled with the windshields and side-rails, and shipped as kits to El Salvador.
3. Train a cadre of welders from El Salvador at facilities in the United States.

66 kits were provided for final assembly in El Salvador, one for each of the M37s in the Salvadoran Army's inventory.

== See also ==
- Astroboy armoured personnel carrier
- Salvadoran Civil War
- Thyssen Henschel UR-416
- Weapons of the Salvadoran Civil War
