= M60 rifle grenade =

M60 anti-personnel
- Type: Rifle grenade
- Place of origin: Yugoslavia

Service history
- Used by: Bangladesh; Colombia; El Salvador; Iraq; SWAPO; Yugoslav Army; ZANLA

Specifications
- Mass: 520 g (18 oz)
- Length: 307 mm (12.1 in)
- Diameter: 30 mm (1.2 in)
- Maximum firing range: 400 m (440 yd)
- Filling weight: 67 g (2.4 oz)

M60 anti-tank
- Type: Rifle grenade
- Place of origin: Yugoslavia

Service history
- Used by: SWAPO; Yugoslav Army

Specifications
- Mass: 602 g (21.2 oz)
- Length: 390 mm (15 in)
- Diameter: 60 mm (2.4 in)
- Maximum firing range: 150 m (160 yd)
- Filling weight: 235 g (8.3 oz)

Yugoslavia manufactured two types of rifle grenade, both with the nomenclature of M60. The M60 anti-personnel rifle grenade bore a resemblance to the French M52 rifle grenade. The M60 anti-tank rifle grenade bore a resemblance to the STRIM 65, also of French origin. It could penetrate 200mm of armour.

Each was propelled by being mounted atop a rifle's 22 mm grenade launching adapter, and being launched by a ballistite (blank) cartridge.

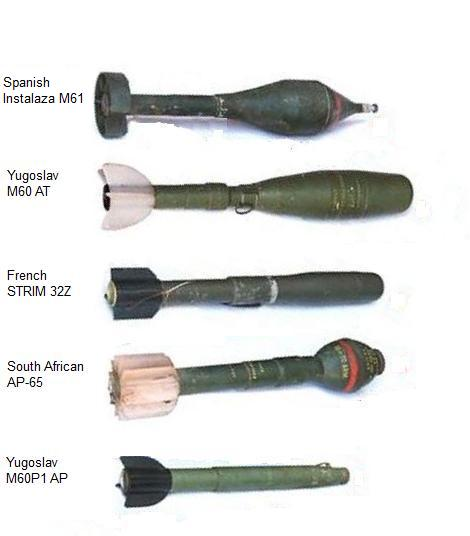
Instalaza grenade and other rifle grenades as encountered during the South African border war in Angola and Namibia.

== See also ==
- List of weapons of the Rhodesian Bush War
- List of weapons of the Lebanese Civil War
- Weapons of the Salvadoran Civil War

== Sources and references ==
- Archer, Denis H R, ed. (1976). "Grenades". Jane's Infantry Weapons (Second Edition) 1976. London: Macdonald and Jane's. p. 467. ISBN 978-0354005319.
- Hand and Rifle Grenades - Worldwide Identification Guide (PDF). Charlottesville, VA: Defense Intelligence Agency. March 1994. DST-1160H-016-94.
