= Dodge M37 =

Military truck of the United States

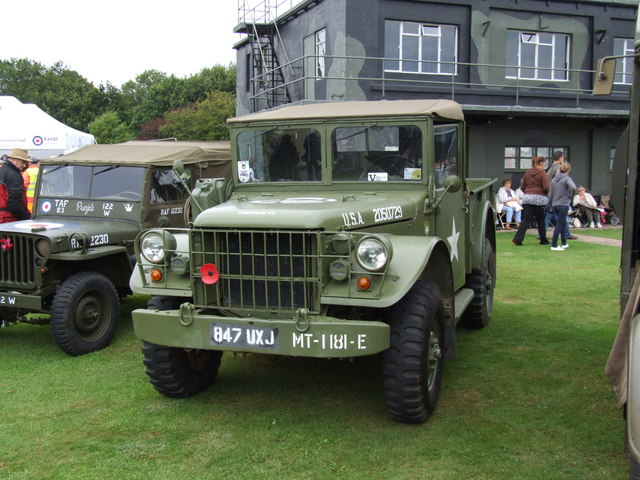
- M37 cargo truck
- Type: 3/4-ton 4x4 truck
- Place of origin: Warren Truck Assembly, Michigan, United States

Service history
- In service: 1951–varies per country
- Wars: Korean War; Vietnam War; Laotian Civil War; Cambodian Civil War; Nicaraguan Revolution; Salvadoran Civil War; Guatemalan Civil War

Production history
- Manufacturer: Dodge
- Produced: 1951–1968
- No. built: 115,838 – across: — M37: ~63,000 units (1951–1954) — M37B1: 47,600 units (from 1958) — M37CDN: 4,500 Canadian (1951–1955)

Specifications (with winch)
- Mass: 5,917 lb (2,684 kg) (empty)
- Length: 15 ft 10 in (4.83 m)
- Width: 6 ft 2 in (1.88 m)
- Height: 7 ft 5 in (2.26 m)
- Engine: Dodge T-245; 78 hp (58 kW)
- Transmission: 4 speed X 2 range
- Suspension: Live beam axles on leaf springs
- Operational range: 225 mi (362 km)
- Maximum speed: 55 mph (89 km/h)

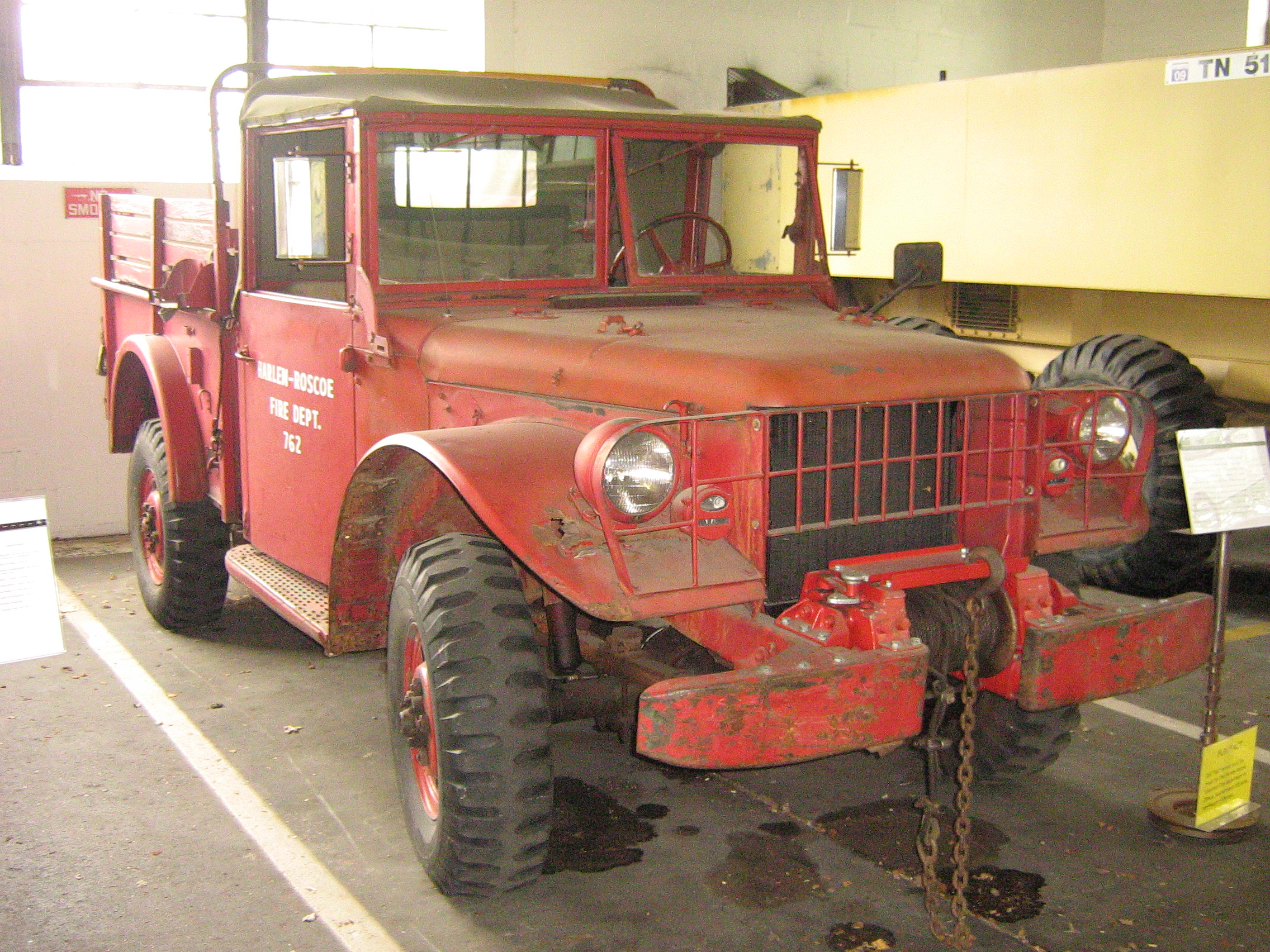
An M56 used as a fire truck in the Lane Motor Museum

The Dodge M37 was a 3/4-ton 4x4 truck developed for service in the United States military as a successor to the widely used Dodge-built WC Series introduced during World War II. Put into service in 1951, it served in a variety of configurations in frontline duty in the Korean War and Vietnam War before being replaced by two commercial off the shelf (COTS) based 1 1/4-ton trucks: the Kaiser M715 (introduced in 1967 and supplied through 1969) and the Dodge M880/M890 series (in the 1970s).

It bore the designation (G741), and after its military phase-out was both put into domestic Federal government agency use and auctioned to civilians in the U.S., and adopted by foreign militaries.

== History ==
Many of the components on the M37 are similar or identical to the Dodge-built World War II WC series vehicles, and many deficiencies of the WC series were corrected in the M37. Notably, a conventional pickup truck style bed replaced the platform on the World War II vehicle, simplifying production. There was significant drivetrain and powerplant commonality with the immediate postwar WDX series civilian Power Wagons, but no sheet metal was shared. Six WC-based prototype W37s were produced in early-to-mid 1950, with the first pre-production pilot vehicle rolling off the assembly line on 14 December 1950.

In total some 115,000 Dodge M37s were produced between 1951 and 1968. Manufacture of the M37 began in earnest in January 1951, with approximately 11,000 vehicles made by the end of that year. By mid-1954 63,000 of the vehicles had been produced. In 1958 a number of modifications to the design resulted in the new vehicles being designated as M37B1. From mid-1958 until the end of production 47,600 M37B1 vehicles were produced. Approximately 4,500 Canadian M37CDNs were also produced between 1951 and 1955. M37s continued in service worldwide in the Israeli and Greek militaries.

From 1968 onwards, the U.S. military replaced the M37 with the heavier-rated 1 1/4 (or five-quarter) ton Kaiser Jeep manufactured M715 family of vehicles. Rather than purpose-built tactical vehicles, these "militarized" commercial off-the-shelf ('COTS') trucks were considered underpowered and fragile compared to the M37. After seeing service in the Vietnam War the M715 was replaced in 1976 by the similarly rated Dodge-built COTS M880 series.

In addition to those M37s that were sold or offered as military aid to allied foreign countries, many were transferred to civilian agencies or sold domestically at government auctions, becoming a not uncommon sight in government and private use in the 1970s and '80s; some are still seen today in rural areas.

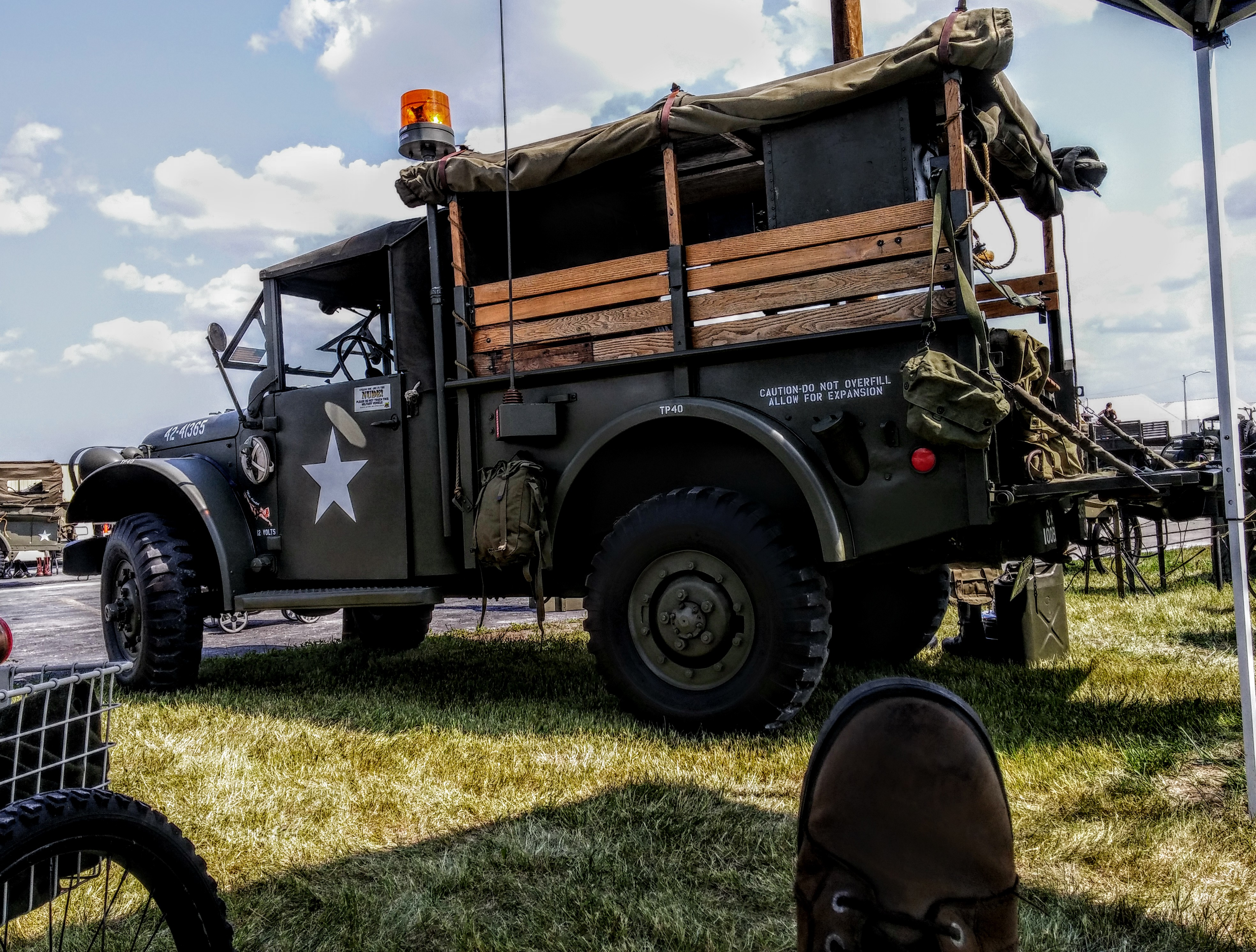
1953 Dodge M37

== Variants ==
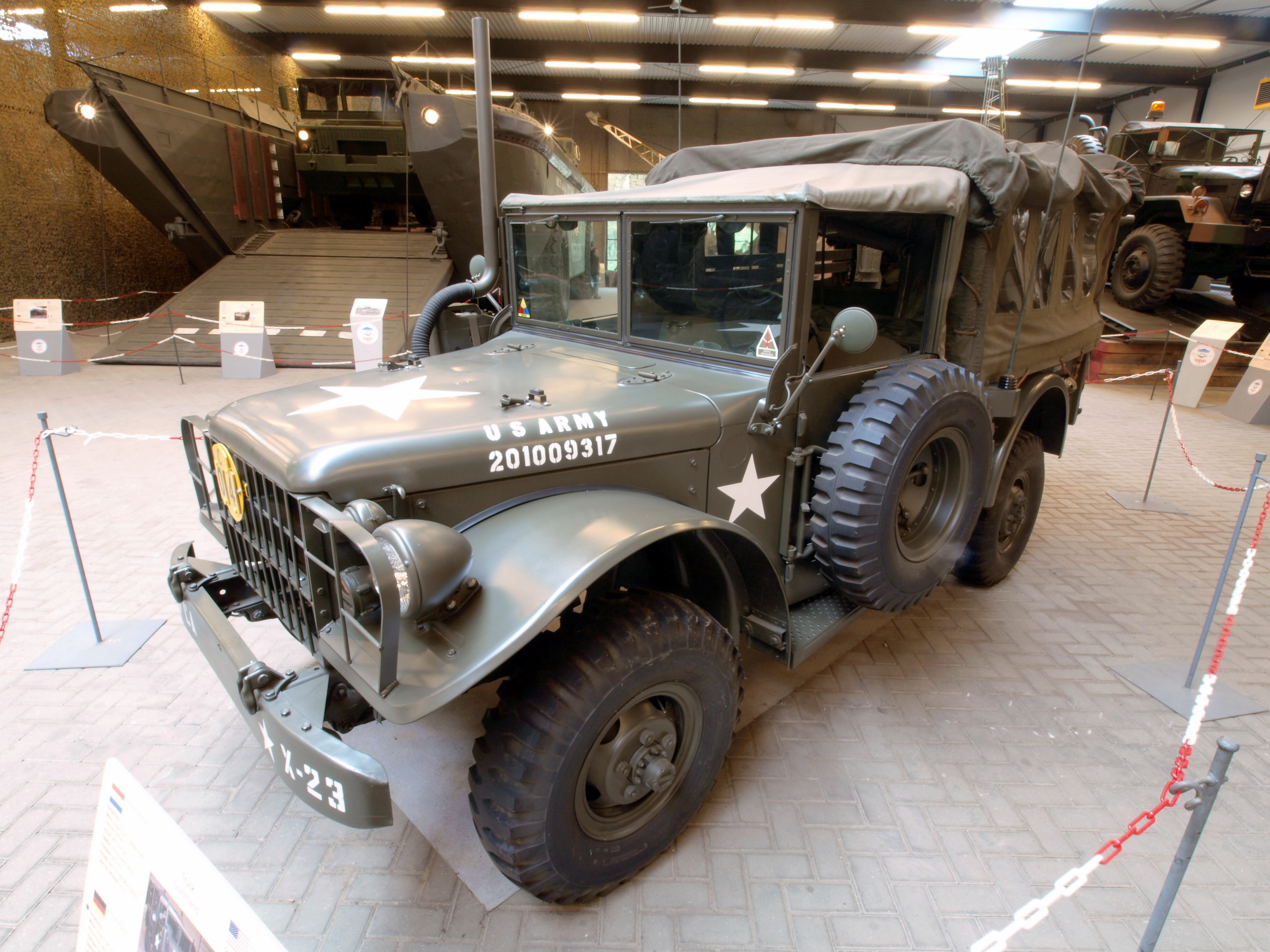
Dodge M42 in the Overloon Museum

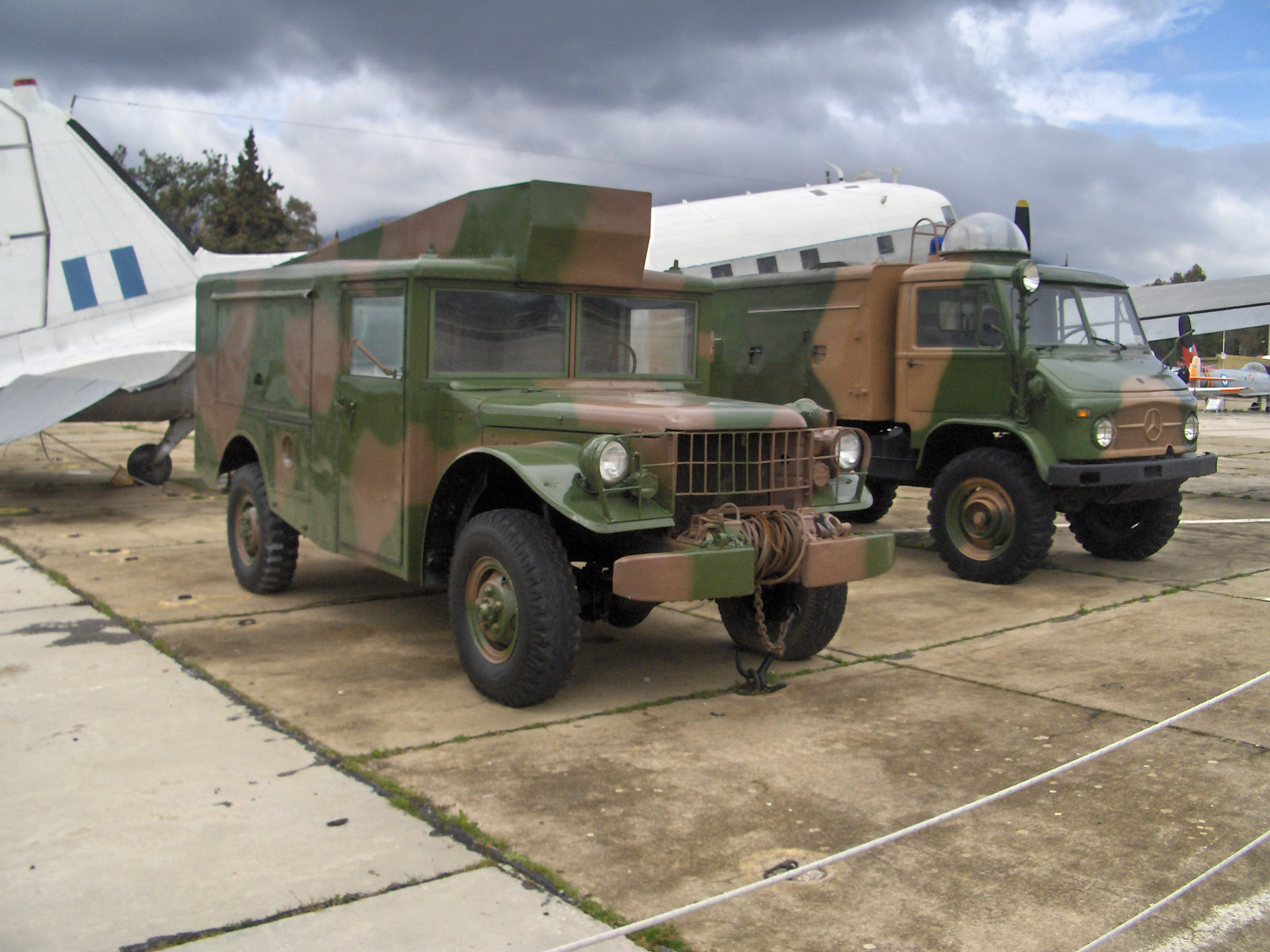
Dodge R2 at the Hellenic Air Force Museum

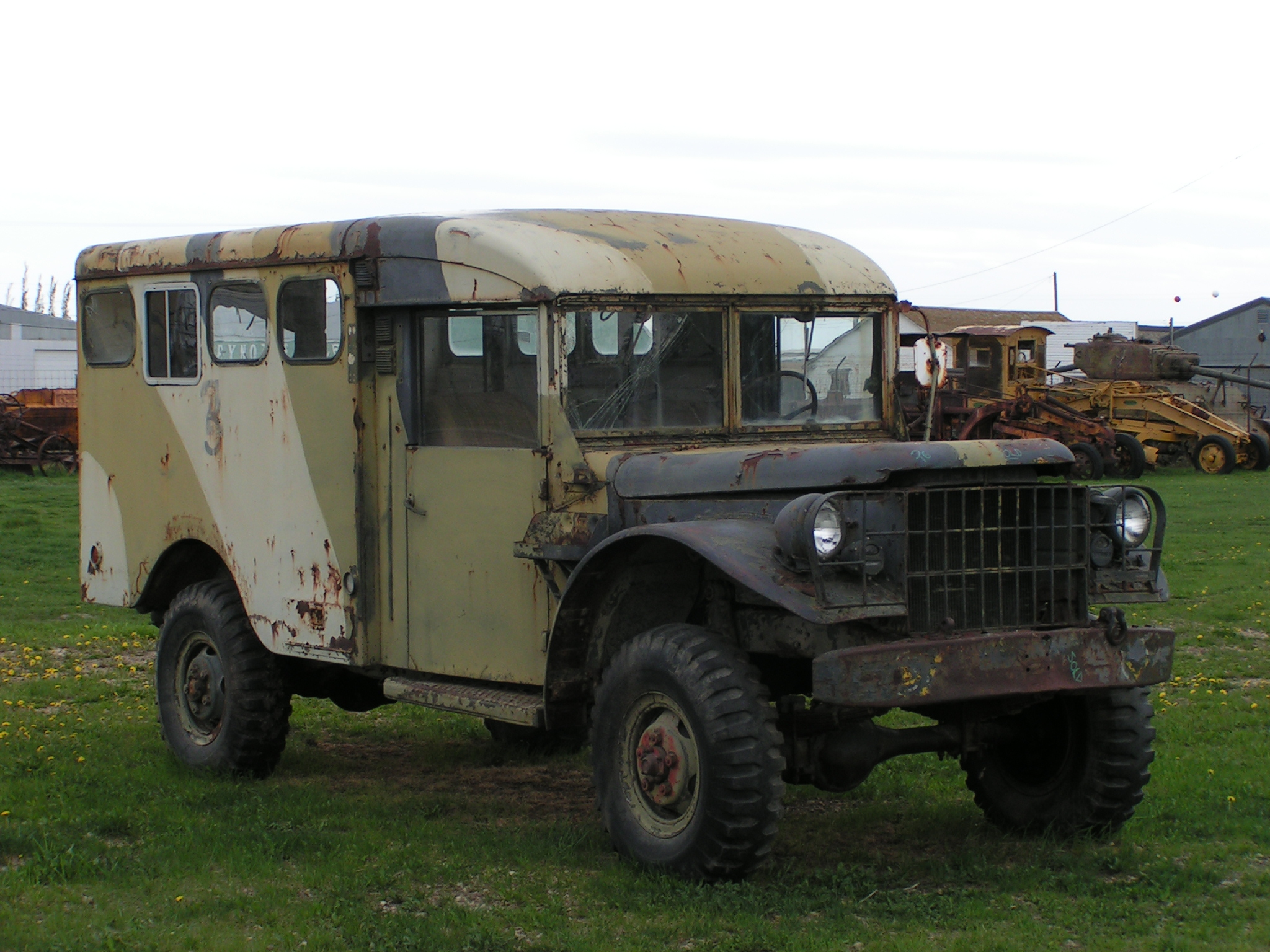
1952 Dodge M152

- M42 command truck
- M43 ambulance
- M53 cab-chassis
- M56 tool truck, has a bumper-mounted winch
  - MB2 Fire and Rescue Truck (M56 with Gichner body)
  - R2 air field rescue truck (w/winch)
- M152 modified enclosed utility truck, Canadian variant
- M201 / V41 telephone maintenance vehicle
- M283 Long Wheel Base (LWB) Cargo Truck
- M506 truck, hydrogen peroxide servicer, PGM-11 Redstone
- V126 truck – for AN/MPX-7 radar

experimental:

- XM142 experimental bomb service truck
- XM152 experimental enclosed utility truck used in small numbers by the USAF
- XM195 experimental lighter, compact version of M37
- XM708 experimental dump truck used mostly by airborne units
- XM711 experimental wrecker truck
- Cashuat armoured APC modification of El Salvador

== Specifications ==
=== Engine ===
The M37's flathead Chrysler Straight-6 engine was carried over from the World War II-era WC vehicle line, as was most of the drivetrain. Using an engine and drivetrain derived from a widely-produced 1930s era passenger vehicle was in line with a long-standing military procurement strategy that attempted to use commercially produced vehicle variants in military service.

- Model: T245 Dodge
- Type: "L" Head, 6 cylinder
- Power: 78 bhp (58.2 kW) at 3200 rpm
- Displacement: 230 cubic inches (3.8 L) (Canadian version used the larger 250.6 cu in (4.1 L) engine)
- Bore: 3 1/4 in (82.6 mm), Stroke: 4 5/8 in (117 mm)
- Oil capacity: 6 U.S. quarts (5.7 L)
- Radiator capacity: 25 U.S. quarts (24 L)
- Carter carburetor Model ETW-1 downdraft

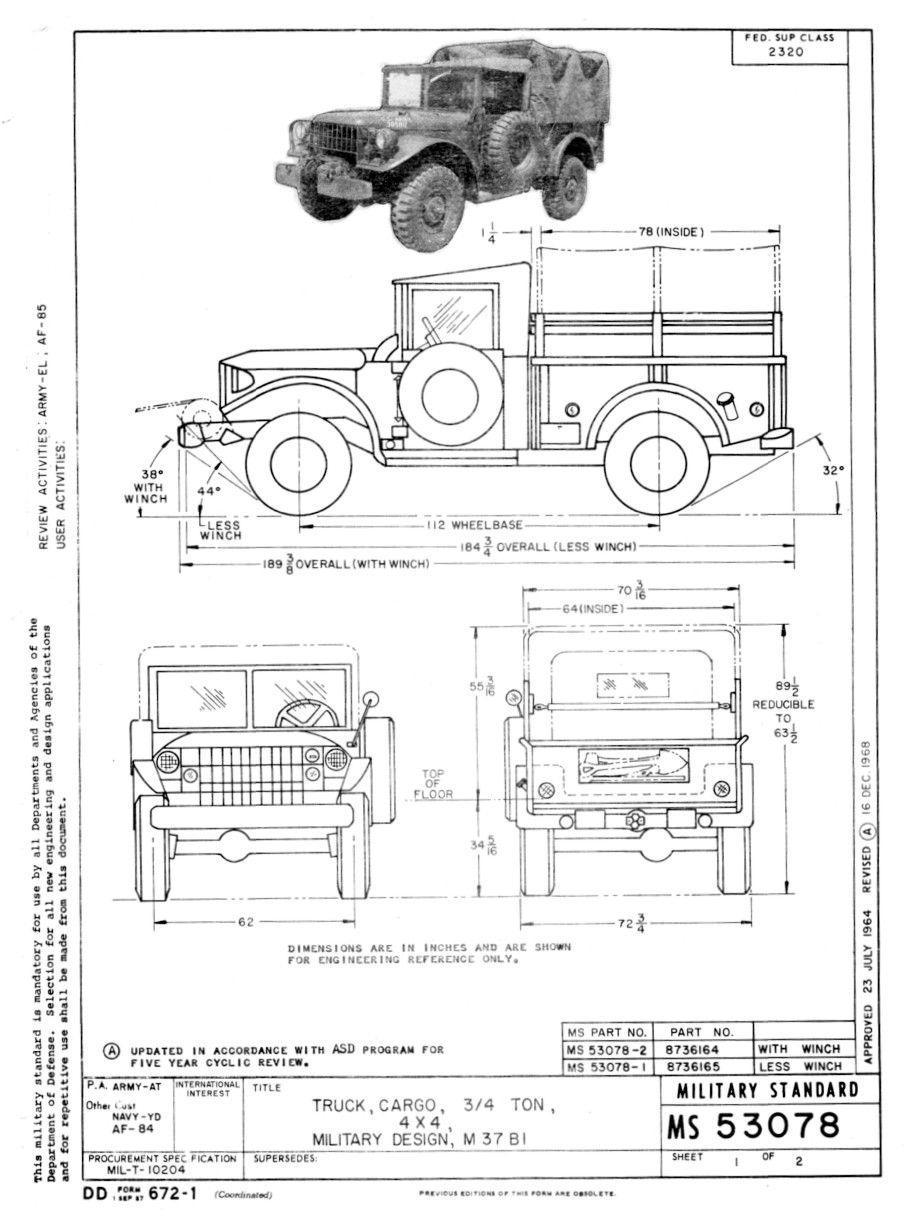
M37 B1 Standard specifications sheet (1968).

=== Driveline ===
Clutch

- Borg & Beck Model 11828 10 in (250 mm) single plate dry disc (Borg & Beck 11 inch clutch on Canadian version.)

Transmission

- New Process Model 88950 (or NP420)(Acme Model T-98 on Canadian version)
- 4-speed, Synchro-Shift in 3rd and 4th gear

Transfer Case

- New Process 88845 (or NP200)
- Ratio: High 1:1, low 1.96:1
- Twin lever operation, one for 4×4 or 4×2 selection, one for hi or low range

Drive Shaft

- MFG Universal Products

Axles

- Dodge Full Floating (hypoid), ratio 5.83:1
- Front Universal Drive New Process (Tracta joint)

=== Chassis ===
Fuel tank

- 24 U.S. gallons (91 L; 20 imp gal) tank (vented through engine air intake for fording purposes)

Electrical

- Ignition, starting, lights, 24 volts

Brakes

- Wagner hydraulic drum
- Parking—external contracting band, 48 square inches (310 cm^{2})

Steering

- Gemmer Model B-60, worm and sector type

Wheelbase

- Cargo Model M37 and Command Model M42: 112 in (2.8 m)
- Ambulance Model M43 and Tele. Maint. Model V41: 126 in (3.2 m)

Weight

- M37 without winch: 5,687 lb (2,580 kg), M37 with winch 5,987 lb (2,716 kg)

Tire Size

- 9.00 × 16 - 8 ply non-directional military

Winch

- Braden LU-4, PTO operated, 7,500 lb (3,400 kg) capacity (250’ of 7/16" wire rope [75 m by 11 mm] – 10’ [3 m] chain with hook)

== Aborted replacement competition ==
During the late 1960s a competition was initiated by the Army, which requested the leading U.S. automotive companies to submit proposals as a replacement for the M37. Several prototype vehicles passed through the preliminary examination, eventually leading the military to accept General Motors XM705 1 1/4-ton Truck and derivative XM737 Ambulance, which were supposed to replace the M37, instead of the militarized COTS M715 series of trucks. However, Congress cut funds for the program, and the XM705 never reached the assembly line.

Below table lists the comparative specifications of the vehicles involved.

Vehicle			XM705	M715	M37
Engine			Chevrolet 8-307	Kaiser Jeep 6-230	Chrysler T-245
Maximum horsepower			200 at 4,600 rpm	132.5 at 4,600 rpm	94 at 3,400 rpm
Net brake horsepower			140 at 4.000 rpm	116 at 4,000 rpm	79 at 3,400 rpm
Speed (miles per hour) on 3 1/2 percent slope with towed load in 4th gear			41	0	0
Cruising range (miles)			300	225	122
Weight distribution (percent)		Front	44	36	42
Weight distribution (percent)		Rear	56	64	58
Ground pressure (maximum)			128	16.1	12.75
Ground clearance under axles (inches)			11.8	10	10.75
Angle (degrees) of	Approach	With winch	61	33	38
Angle (degrees) of	Approach	Without winch	61	45	44
Angle (degrees) of	Departure		45	25	32

== Gallery ==
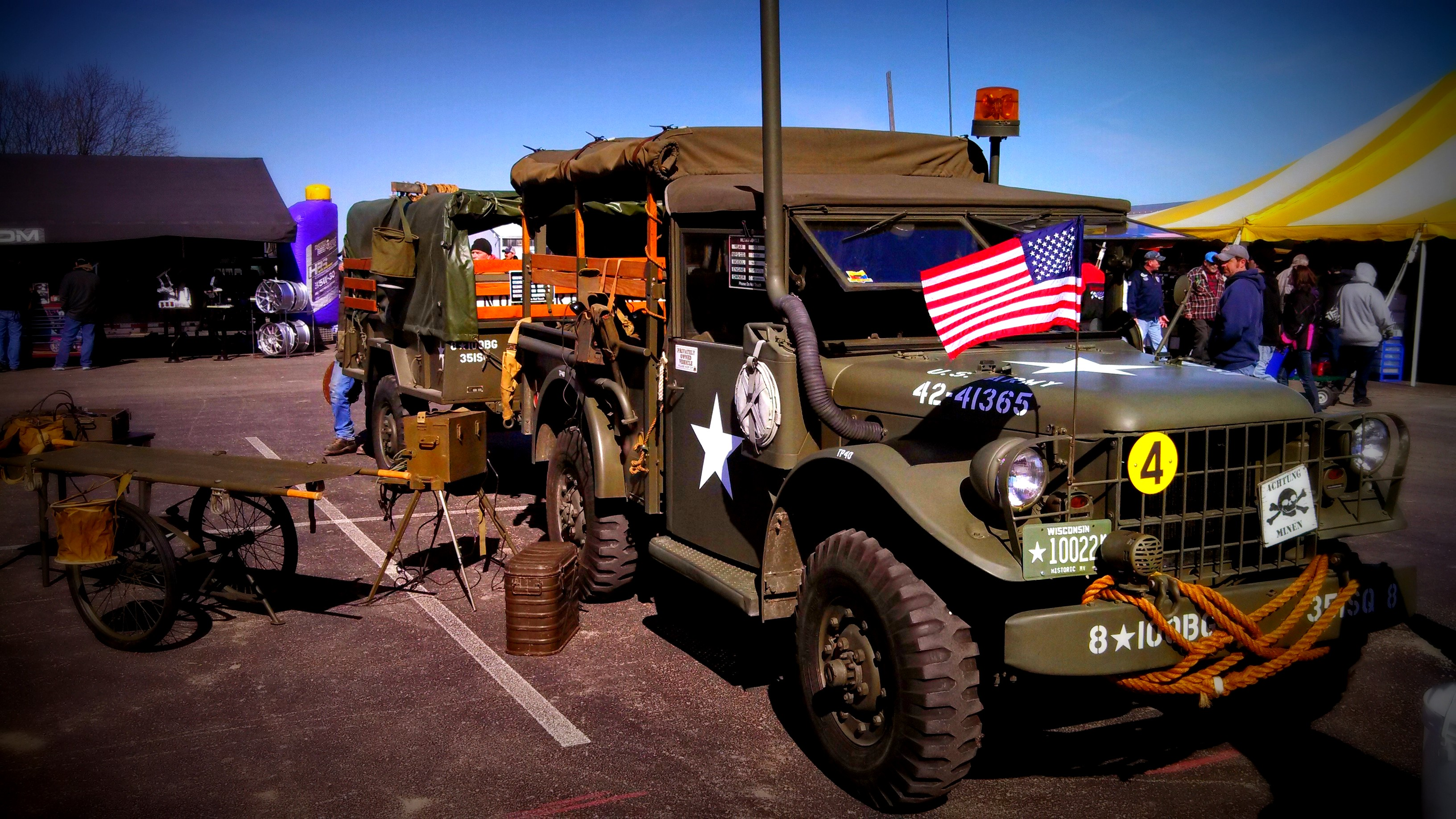
1953 M37 and 1953 M101 trailer

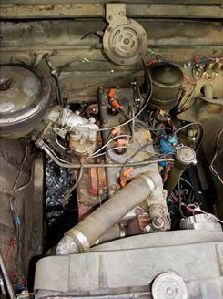
1953 straight six

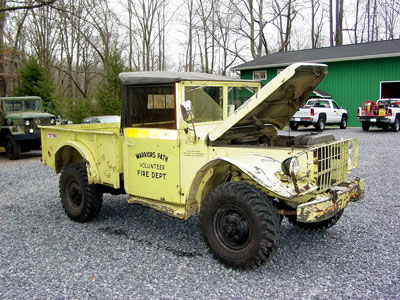
1953 M37

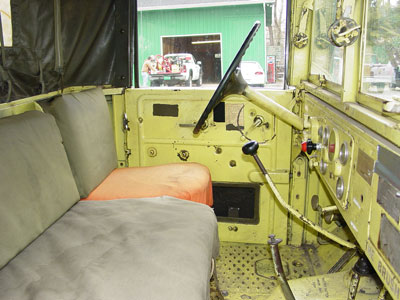
Interior of 1953 M37

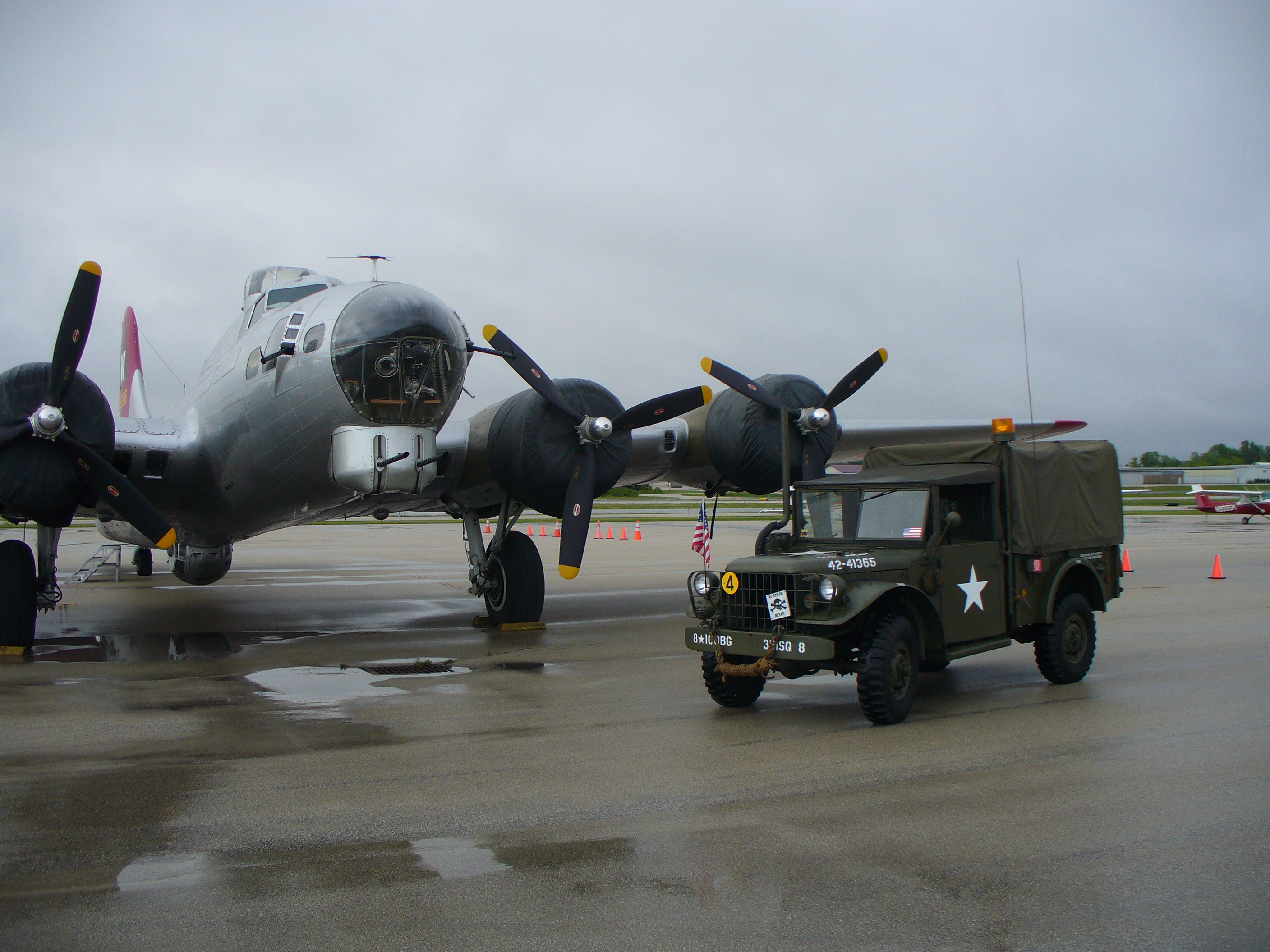
M37 in front of a B-17G operated by the Experimental Aircraft Association.

== See also ==
- Dodge WC series
- G-numbers
- List of Dodge automobiles
- List of U.S. military vehicles by model number
- Weapons of the Salvadoran Civil War
