= Weapons of the Salvadoran Civil War =

The Salvadoran Civil War was a military conflict of the Cold War that pitted the guerrilla forces of the left-wing Marxist-oriented Farabundo Martí National Liberation Front (FMLN) against the armed and security forces loyal to the military-led conservative government of El Salvador, between 1979 and 1992. The main combatants were as follows:

- The Armed Forces of El Salvador (Spanish: Fuerzas Armadas de El Salvador – FAES), which were backed by the United States, Taiwan and Israel, were the official armed defense forces of El Salvador. Subordinated to the Ministry of Defense and Security of the Salvadoran government at the capital San Salvador, the FAES branches were organized as follows:
  - Salvadoran Army (Spanish: Ejército Salvadoreño)
  - Salvadoran Air Force (Spanish: Fuerza Aérea Salvadoreña)
  - Salvadoran Navy (Spanish: Fuerza Naval de El Salvador)
- Paramilitary security forces:
  - National Guard (Spanish: Guardia Nacional)
- The Farabundo Martí National Liberation Front (Spanish: Frente Farabundo Martí para la Liberación Nacional), more commonly known by its Spanish acronym FMLN, was an alliance or umbrella organization of five left-wing guerrilla groups created in 1980, which was backed by Cuba, Nicaragua, and the Eastern Bloc countries.

An eclectic variety of weapons was used by both sides in the Salvadoran Civil War. The Armed Forces of El Salvador were equipped with Western-made weapons, mainly American and Israeli in origin, but also included Argentine, Portuguese, French, West German, Yugoslavian and Taiwanese military hardware. During the early phase of the war, the FMLN likewise were largely equipped with Western arms and munitions, though as the war went on, Eastern Bloc weaponry began to play a major role.

== Armed Forces of El Salvador equipment ==
=== Small arms ===
==== Pistols ====
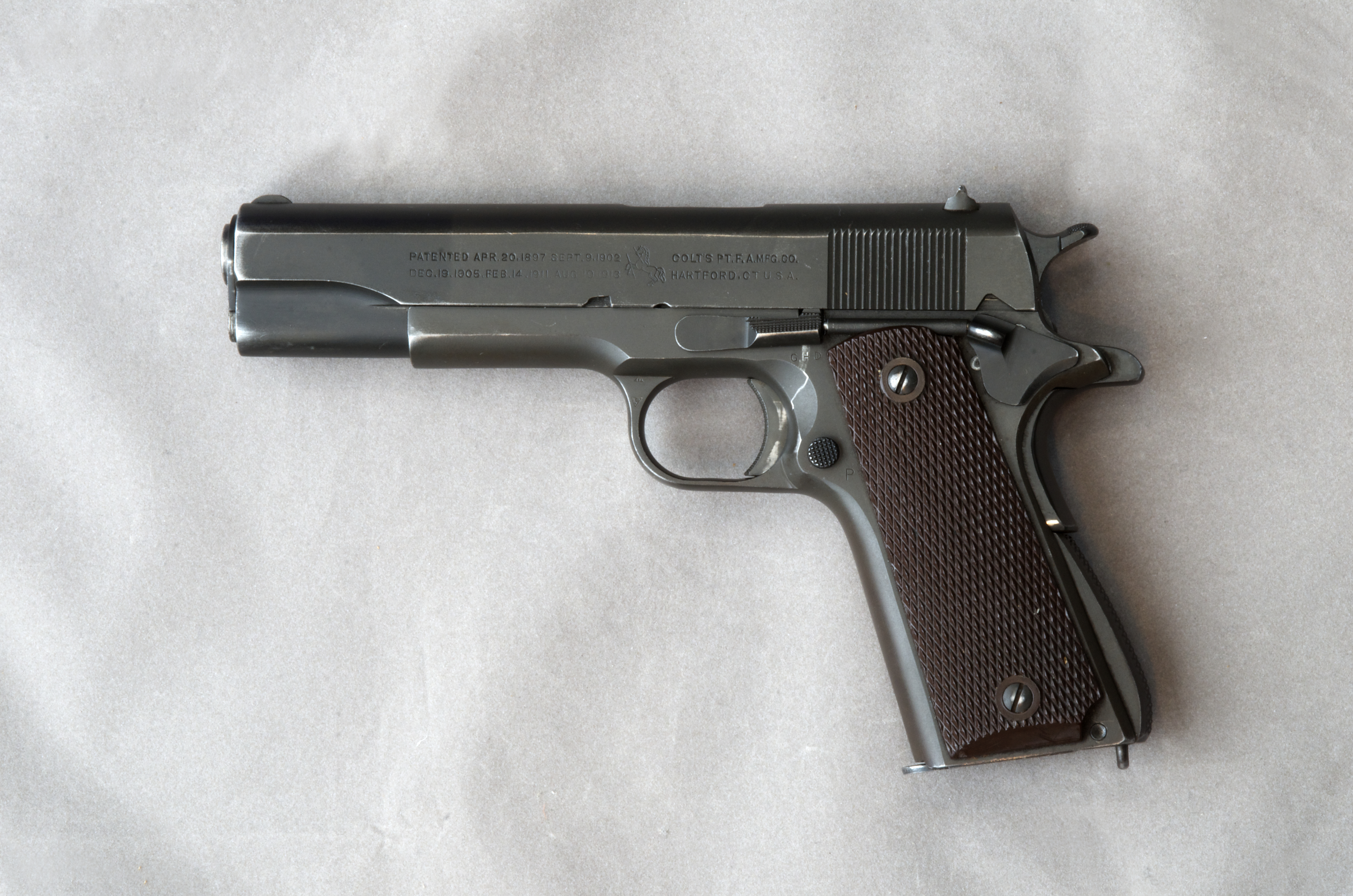
Colt M1911A1 pistol

- FN35 9mm
- Colt.45 M1911A1

==== Battle and assault rifles ====
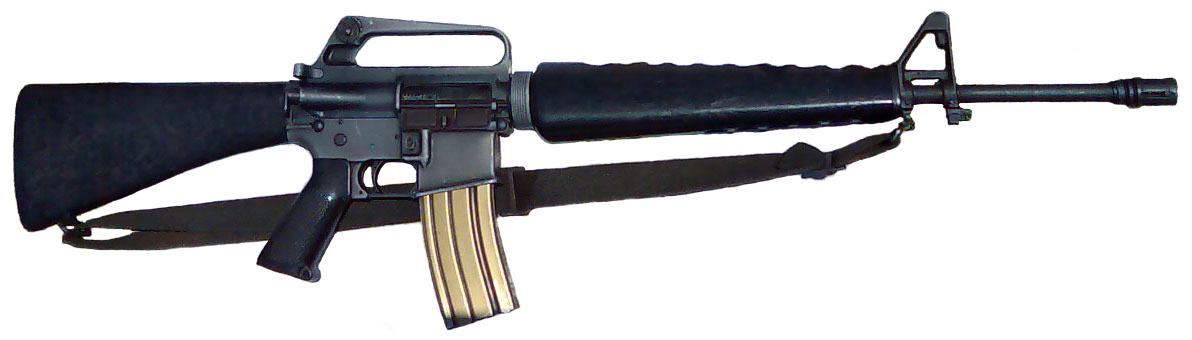
M16A1 assault rifle

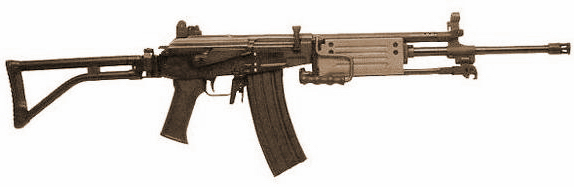
Galil assault rifle

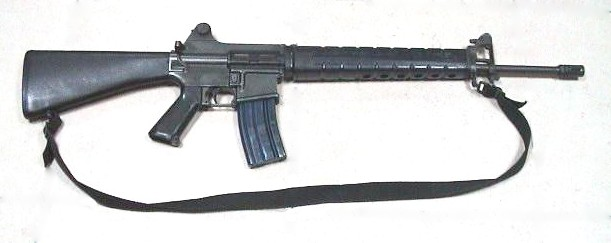
T65 assault rifle

- Heckler & Koch G3: Originally the standard service rifle of the Salvadoran Army before being replaced by the M-16A1/A2. The first G3s were of West German origin; however, when the U.S. began increasing small arms deliveries to El Salvador, they purchased surplus rifles from Portugal and gave them as military aid.
- M16A1/A2: The M16A1/A2 was initially issued to elite units before being issued to the rest of the army when it became the standard rifle. The first large-scale delivery occurred in 1981 with 11,868 units delivered. A total of 32,374 M16A1/A2 rifles were delivered between 1980 and 1993. The U.S. began to replace the G3 rifles in the hands of the Salvadorian Army in 1981 with the delivery of 11,868 AR-15A1 R613 (M16A1); followed by another 20,743 M16s purchased with FMS funds for El Salvador in 1982. Many of these "new" rifles were actually leftovers from Vietnam. Eventually, another 45,160 AR-15A1 R613 followed, to include more than 500 CAR-15A1 R639 (XM177E2 Commando – typified as M16A2 for El Salvador) to equip the Mechanized Infantry and officer Corps and hundreds of CAR-15A1 R653 (M16A1) Carbines starting in 1985, and even brand-new M16s supplied by Springfield Armory.
- CAR-15: Colt Automatic Rifle-15 Military Weapons System or CAR-15. The CAR-15: Colt Automatic Rifle-15 Military Weapons System or CAR-15 was delivered to all military branches of the Armed Forces of El Salvador and was also used with attached M203 grenade launchers.
- Colt Commando (model 733, note M16A2-style brass deflector and forward assist), the USA military aid to El Salvador included the supply of this Car-15 variant that was used extensively by the Armed Forces of El Salvador. They also were used with attached M203 grenade launchers. The Immediate Reaction Infantry Battalions (BIRI) used this variant with the M203 attached.
- IMI Galil
- Heckler & Koch HK33
- T65 assault rifle: Taiwan had extensive diplomatic and military ties with El Salvador. Before and during the civil war, the Republic of China (Taiwan) sold weaponry including the T65 to the former Salvadoran security forces. Taiwan also trained Salvadoran military officers in the civil war; even after the end of the war, Taiwan had continued to give military advice and training to its diplomatic allies including El Salvador until 2018.

==== Carbines and semi-automatic rifles ====
- M1/M2 carbine
- M1 Garand
- M14 rifle

==== Sniper rifles ====
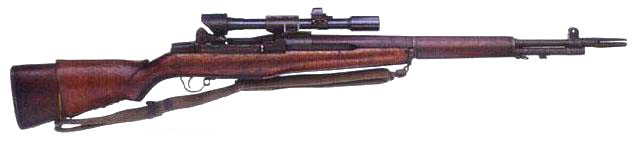
Rifle, Cal. 30, M1D with M84 telescope and T-37 flash suppressor

- Steyr SSG 69
- M1D Sniper rifle: 184 units delivered (1980-1993).
- M21 Sniper Weapon System
- M24 Sniper Weapon System

==== Submachine guns ====
- Uzi
- FMK M35 High Power
- FMK-PA-3 9mm
- Heckler & Koch MP5
- Heckler & Koch MP5K

==== Machine guns ====
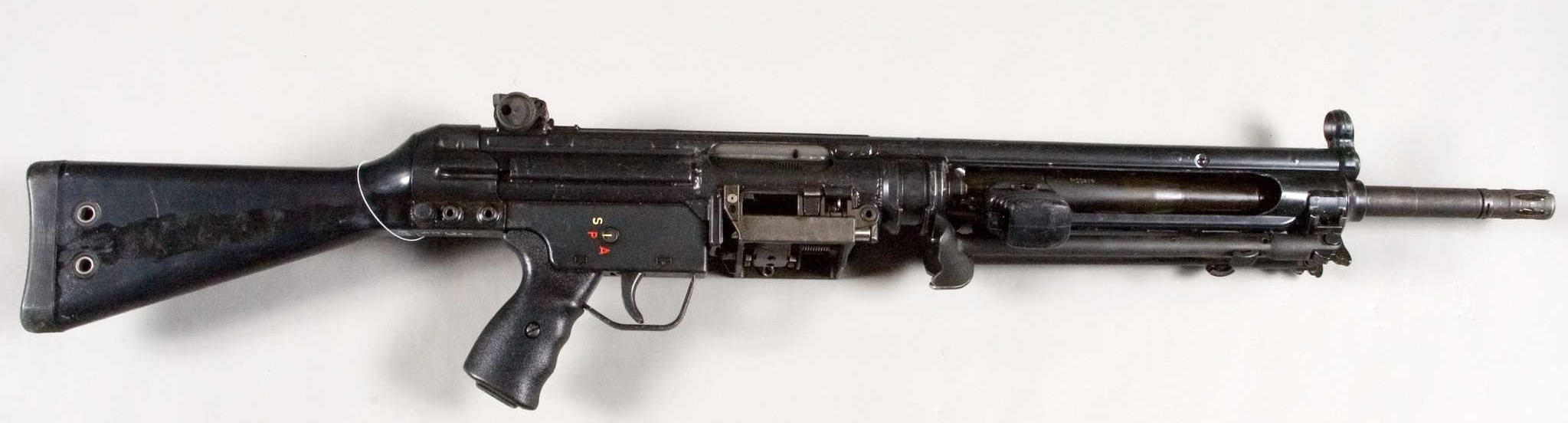
HK 21 light machine gun

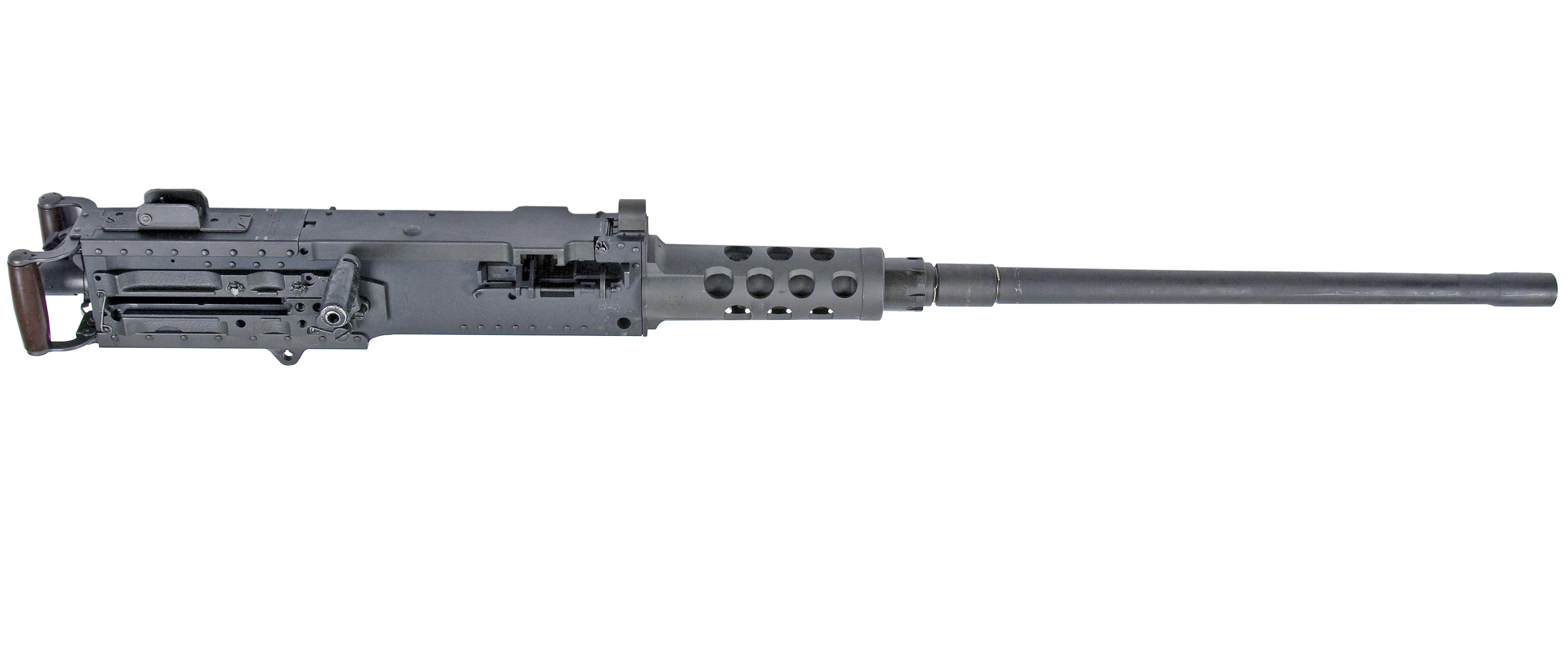
M2HB heavy machine gun

- Madsen M1934/M1951
- Heckler & Koch HK21
- FN Minimi
- FN MAG
- M60
- M60E2
- M60D
- Browning M1919A4 .30 Cal
- Browning M1919A6 light machine gun
- Browning M2HB .50 Cal

==== Grenade systems ====
- Mark 2 "Pineapple" Fragmentation Hand/Rifle Grenade
- M60P1 anti-personnel rifle grenade
- M60 AT anti-tank rifle grenade
- M61 Fragmentation Hand Grenade
- M67 Fragmentation hand grenade
- M26A1 Fragmentation Hand Grenade
- M18 Smoke Hand Grenade
- M34 White Phosphorus Smoke Hand Grenade

=== Land mine systems ===
- M18A1 Claymore anti-personnel mine
- M14 anti-personnel mine
- M26 anti-personnel mine

=== Anti-tank rocket and grenade launchers ===
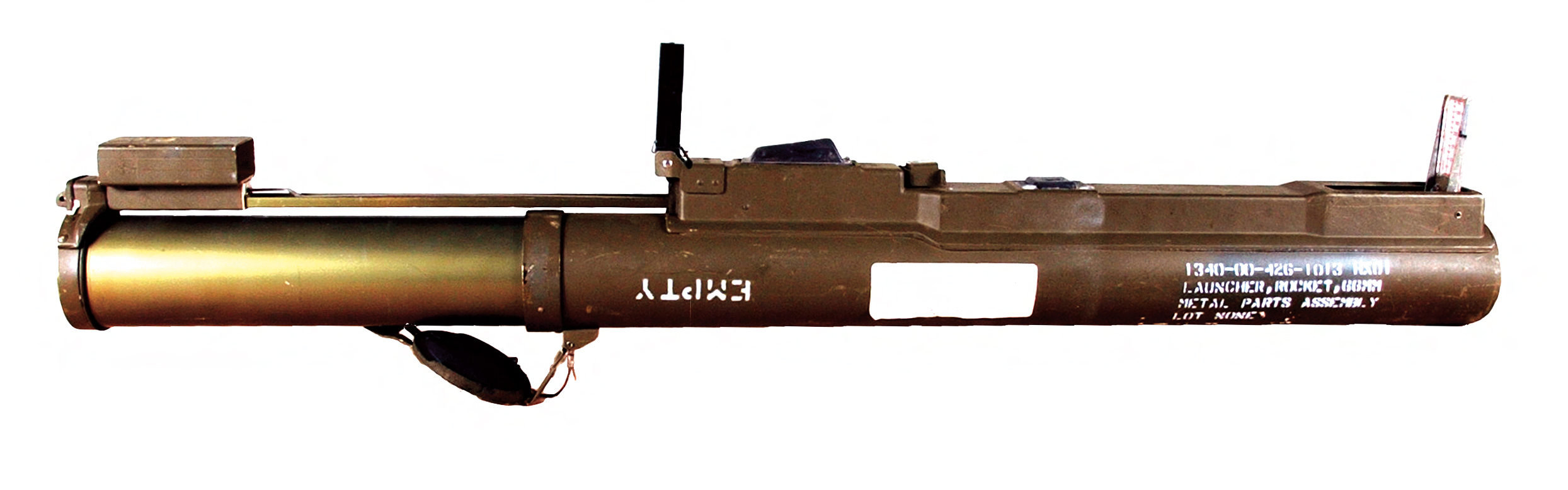
M72 LAW

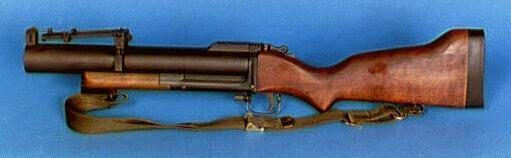
M79 grenade launcher

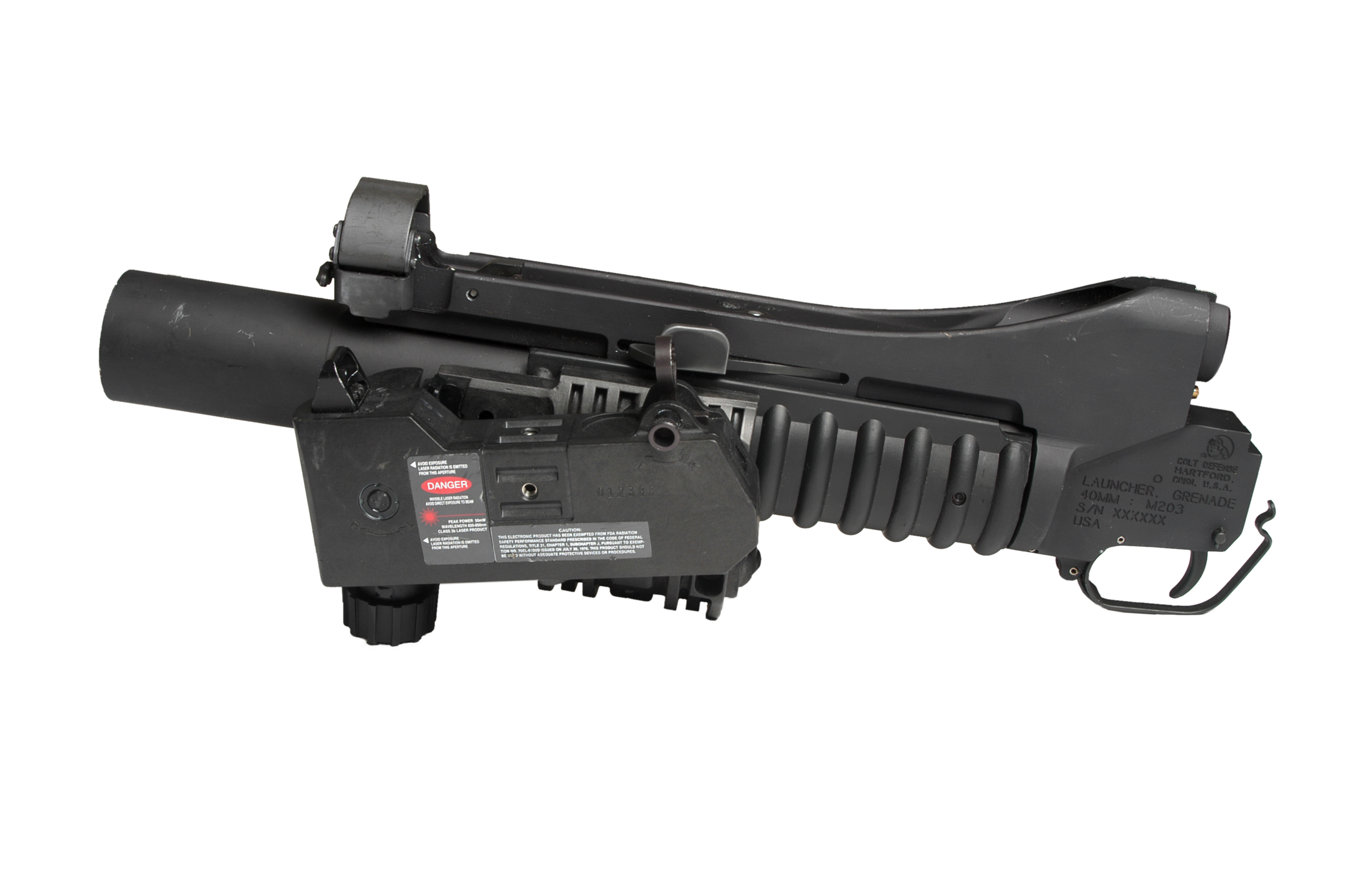
M203 grenade launcher

- M20A1 89 mm Super Bazooka
- M72 LAW
- RPG-2: Captured
- RPG-7: Captured
- M79 grenade launcher: 1,704 units delivered (1980–1993)
- M203 grenade launcher: 1,413 units delivered (1980–1993)

=== Mortars ===
- M19 60 mm
- Stokes-Brandt M1 81 mm
- M29 81 mm
- M74 120 mm
- UB M-52 120 mm

=== Recoilless rifles ===
- M18 57 mm
- M20 75 mm
- M67 90 mm
- M40A1 106 mm

=== Artillery ===
- M101A1 105 mm towed field howitzer
- M102 105 mm light towed field howitzer
- Zastava M56 105 mm towed field howitzer: Yugoslav version of the M101 howitzer.
- M114 155 mm towed field howitzer
- M116 75 mm pack howitzer

=== Anti-aircraft weapons ===
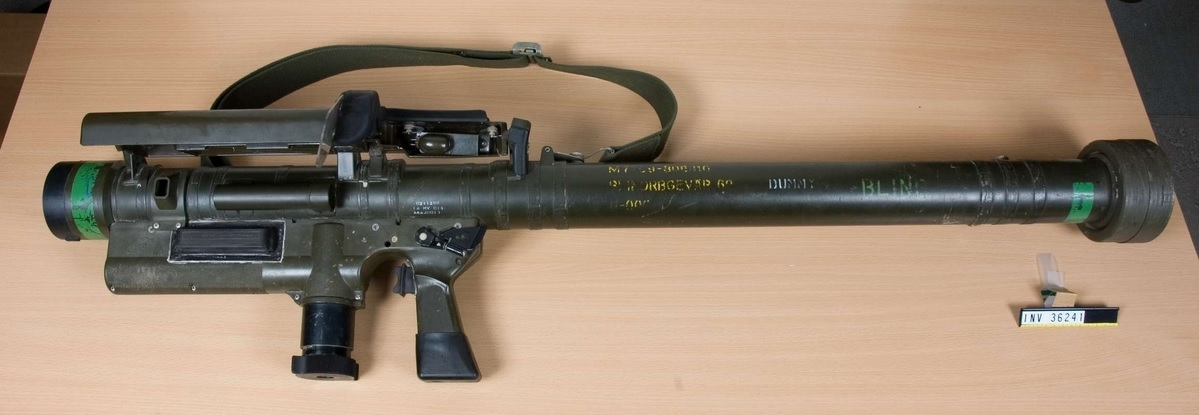
FIM-43 Redeye canister.

- TCM-20 20 mm mount
- Zastava M55A2 20 mm AA autocannon
- FIM-43 Redeye surface-to-air missile

=== Vehicles ===
- M3A1 Light tank
- AMX-13 Light tank
- Panhard AML-90 armoured car
- M114 armored fighting vehicle
- Thyssen Henschel UR-416 armoured car
- VAL M-37B1 Cashuat armoured personnel carrier
- Ford F-250 Astroboy armoured personnel carrier
- Mazinger armoured truck
- M3 Scout Car
- M3A1 Half-track
- Jeep CJ-5
- M151A1/A2 ¼-ton 4×4 utility truck
- M35A2 2½-ton 6x6 medium cargo truck
- M809 5-ton 6x6 heavy cargo truck
- MAN 630 heavy cargo truck

=== Helicopters ===
- Aérospatiale SA 315B Lama II light helicopter
- Aérospatiale SA 316B/C Alouette III light utility helicopter
- Fairchild Hiller FH-1100 light helicopter
- MD 500D Defender light multi-role military helicopter (used in the gunship role)
- Bell UH-1H/M Iroquois (used in the transport and gunship roles)
- Bell 412 Multipurpose Utility helicopter

=== Aircraft ===
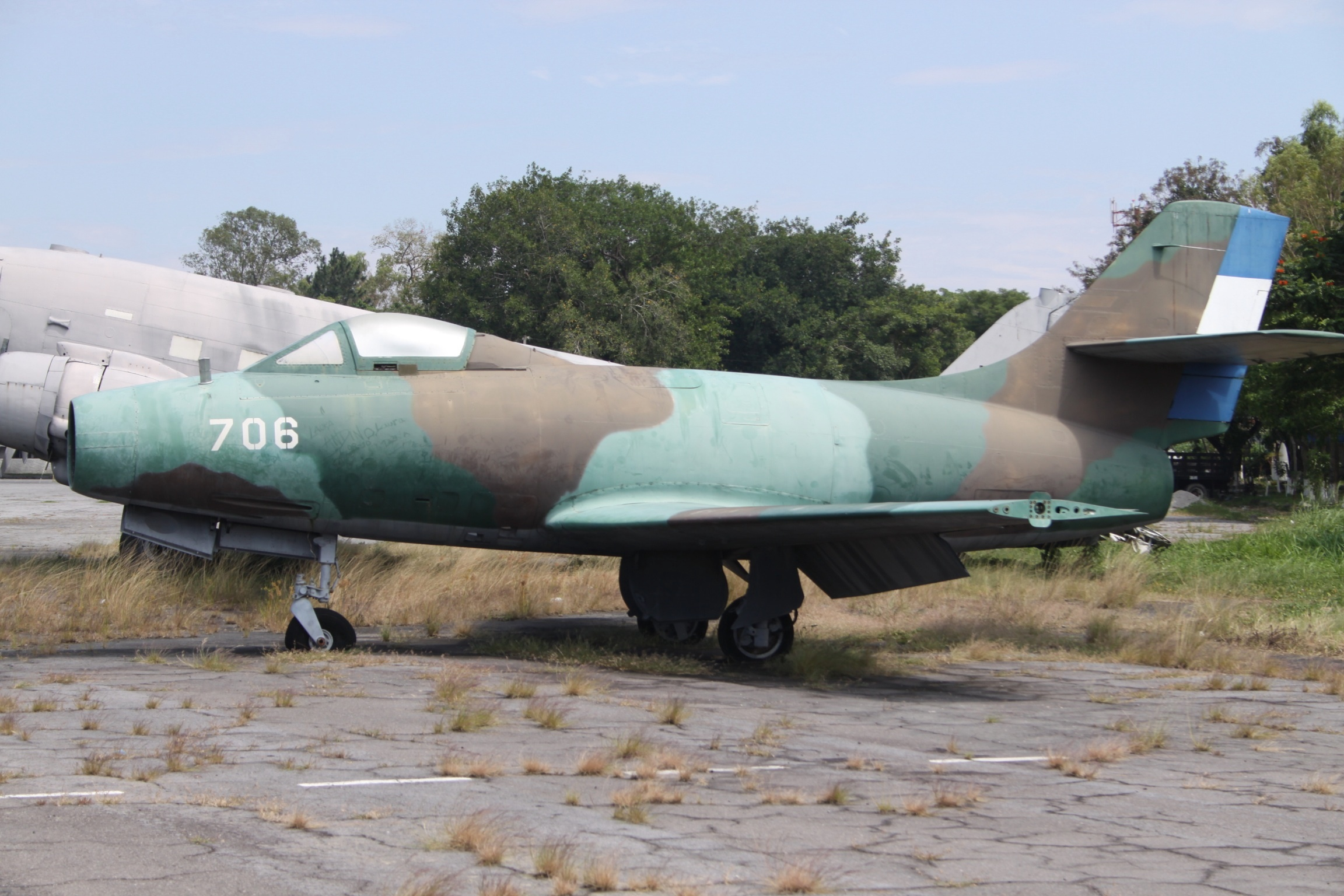
Dassault MD 450B Ouragan fighter-bomber of the El Salvador Air Force on static display at Ilopango Air Base, San Salvador.

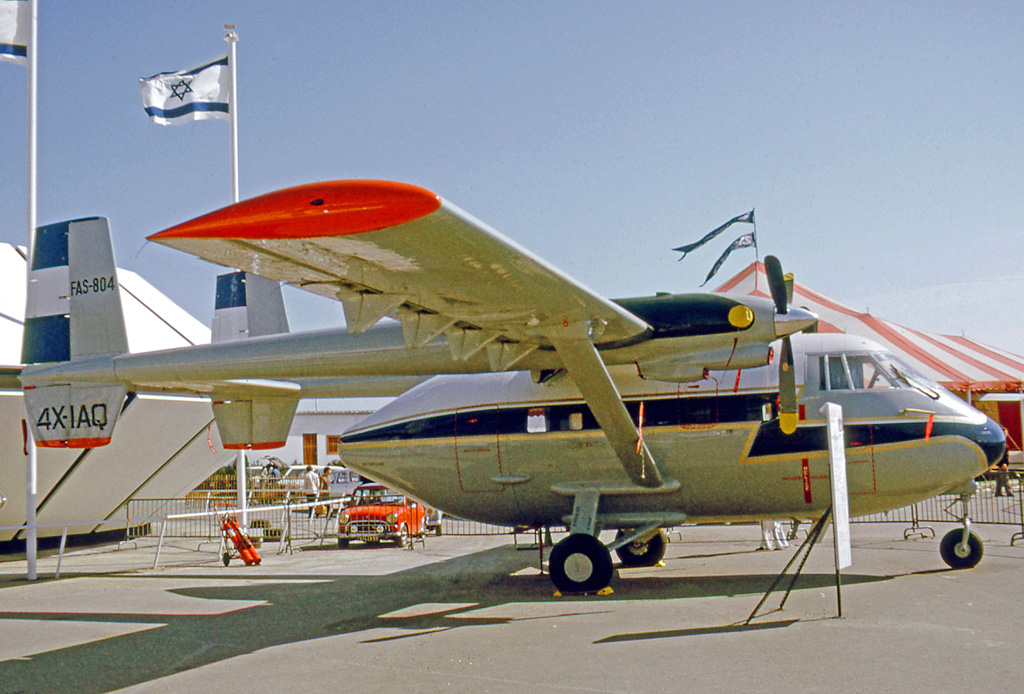
Arava 201 STOL utility transport displayed at the 1975 Paris Air Show prior to delivery to the El Salvador Air Force.

- Fouga CM.170 Magister Jet trainer/light strike aircraft.
- Dassault MD 450B Ouragan Fighter-bomber
- Cessna A-37B Dragonfly ground-attack aircraft
- Douglas AC-47 Spooky Gunship
- Douglas C-47D Skytrain Military transport aircraft
- Fairchild C-123K Provider Military transport aircraft
- Douglas DC-6B Airliner/transport aircraft
- IAI Arava 201 STOL utility transport
- Cessna 0-2A/B Super Skymaster Observation aircraft
- Cessna 337A Super Skymaster Utility aircraft
- Cessna 180 Skywagon light utility aircraft
- Cessna T-41 Mescalero trainer
- Beechcraft T-34 Mentor trainer

=== Naval craft ===
- CG 40ft-type patrol launch
- Camcraft-type small patrol boat
- US Protector-class patrol boat
- US 65ft Commercial Cruiser-class patrol boat
- US Swiftships 65ft class patrol boat
- US Swiftships 77ft class patrol boat
- US Point-class cutter/patrol boat
- US Balsam-class navigation aids tender (served as flagship for the Salvadoran Navy and offshore patrol vessel)
- LCM-6 Landing Craft Utility (LCU)
- LCM-8 Landing Craft Utility (LCU)

== FMLN equipment ==
=== Small arms ===
==== Pistols ====
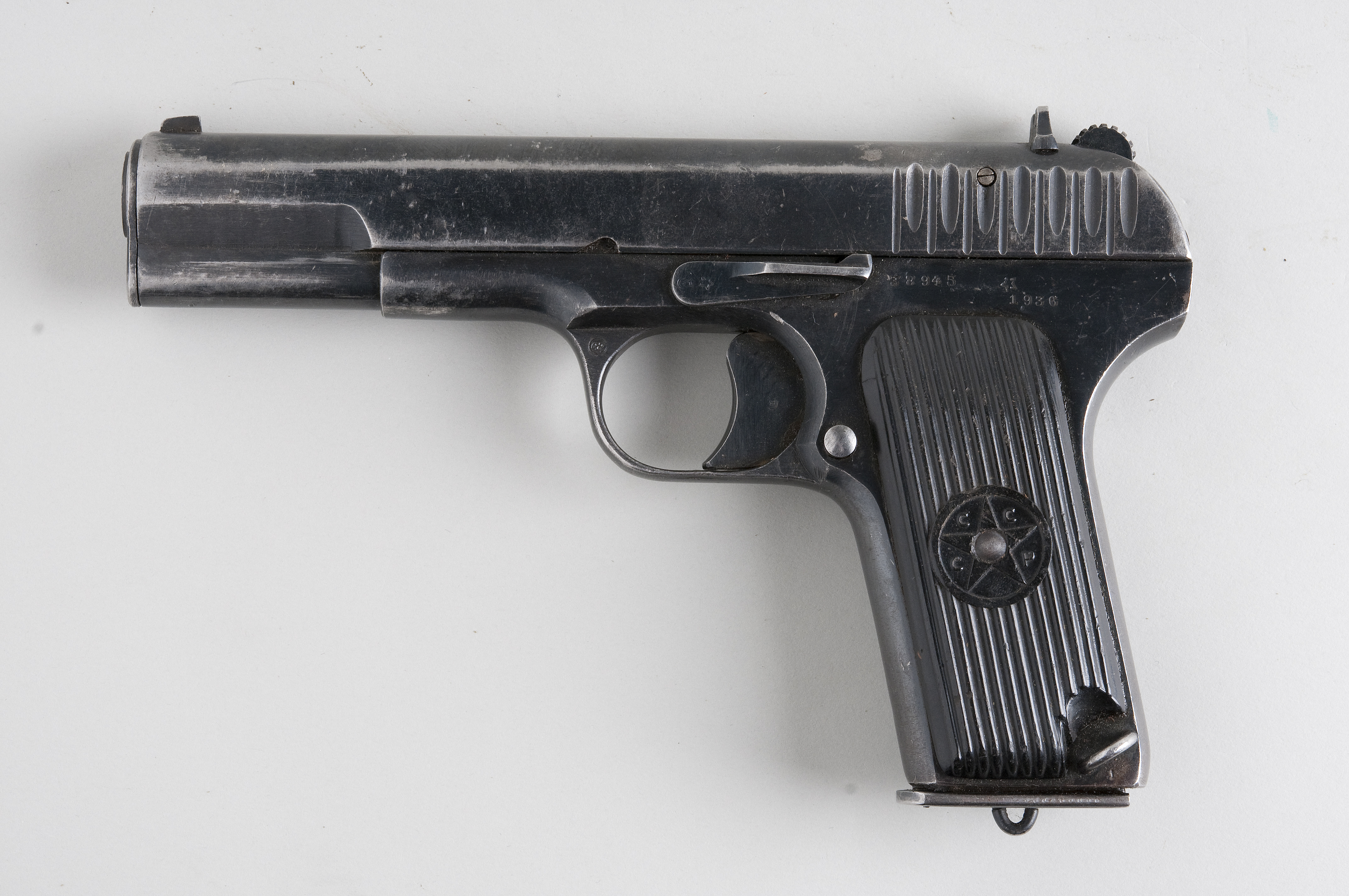
Tokarev TT-33 pistol

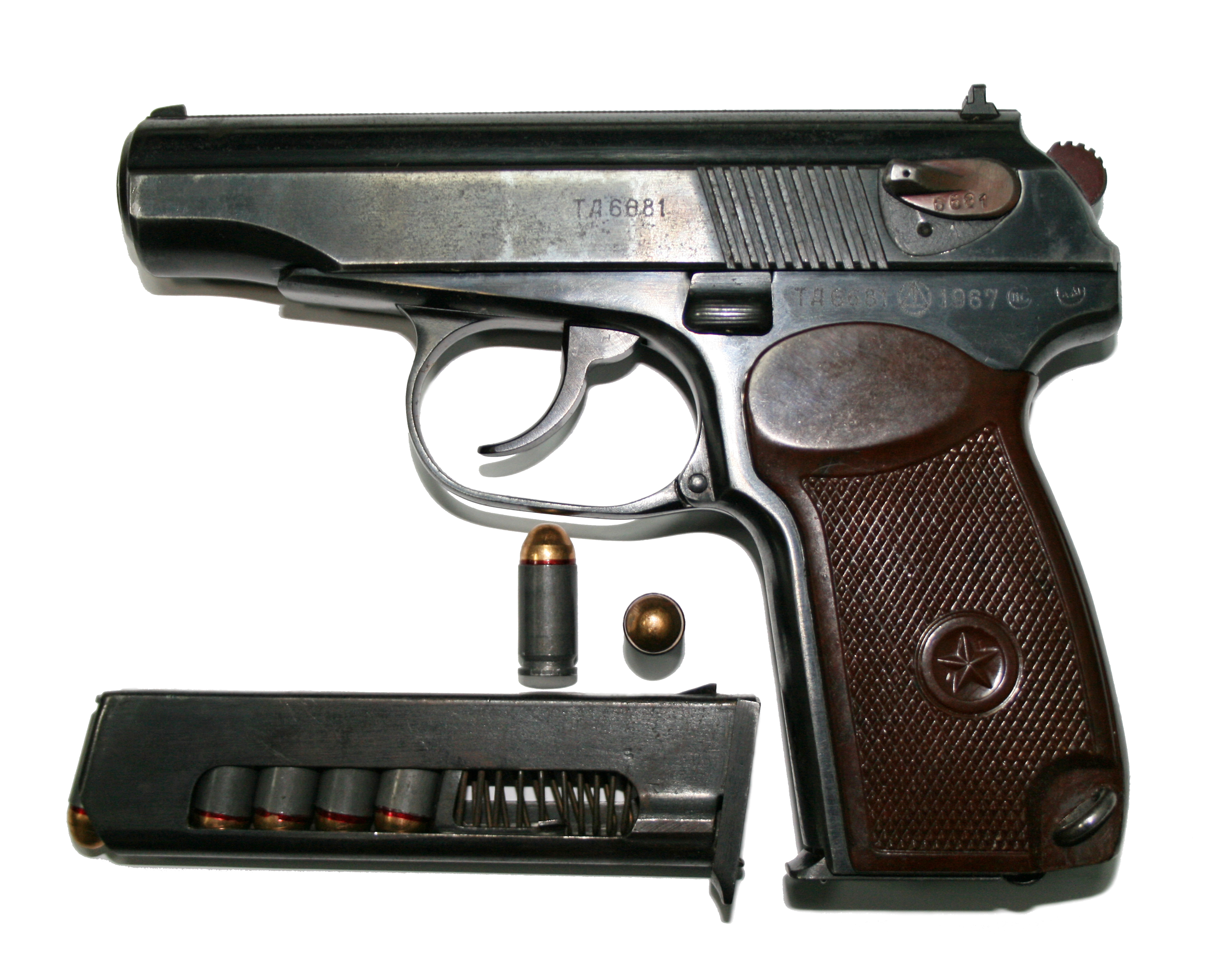
Makarov PM pistol

- FEG PA-63
- Tokarev TT-33: Included the North Korean Type 68 variant.
- Makarov PM
- Colt.45 M1911A1: Captured
- CZ 52

==== Battle and assault rifles ====
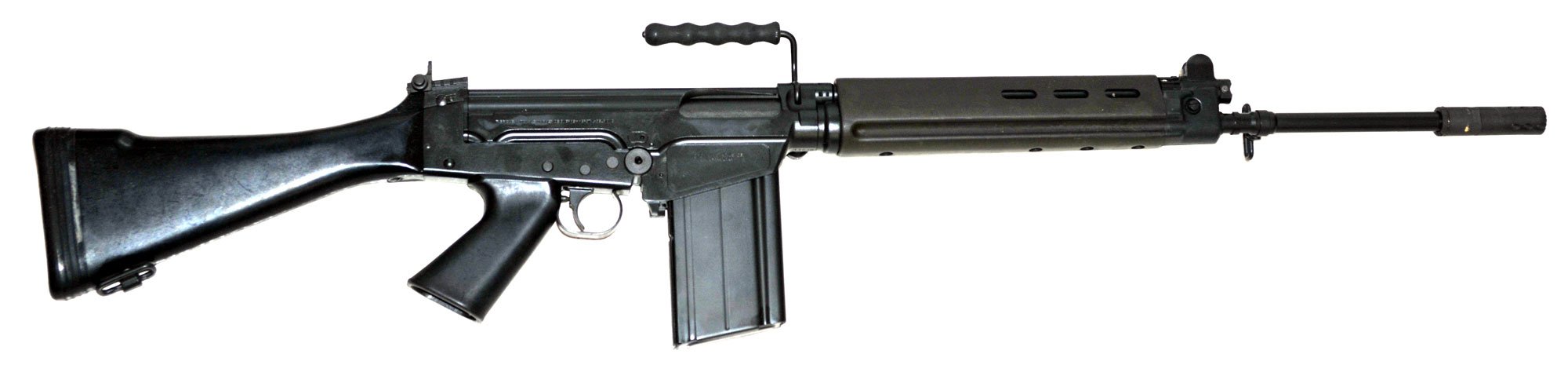
FN FAL assault rifle

- FN FAL: Most of the FAL rifles used by the guerrillas were traced by their serial numbers to rifles previously sold by Belgium to Cuba during the late Batista and early Castro years.
- Heckler & Koch G3: Captured
- M16A1: The bulk of the M16A1 rifles captured by government forces from the guerrillas were also traced from their serial numbers to shipments sent by the United States to the South Vietnamese Army of the Republic of Vietnam (ARVN) prior to the fall of the Saigon government in 1975.
- AK-47 (Included both the Soviet model and the North Korean Type 58)
- AKM (Variants also used included the Hungarian AK-63, East German MpiKMS-72, Romanian Pistol Mitralieră model 1963/1965 and the North Korean Type 68)
- Type 56 from China
- T65 assault rifle: Captured
- Heckler & Koch HK33: Captured
- IMI Galil: Captured
- CAR-15: Captured

==== Carbines and semi-automatic rifles ====
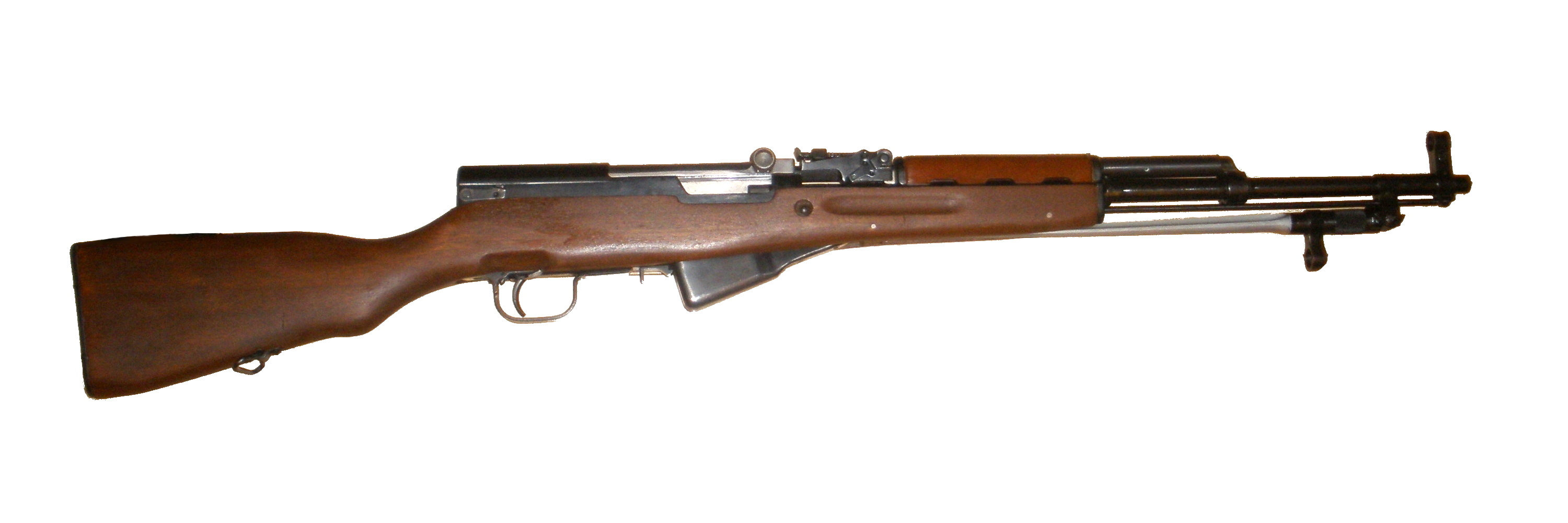
SKS semi-automatic rifle

- M1 Garand: Captured
- SKS
- Type 63 rifle

==== Sniper rifles ====
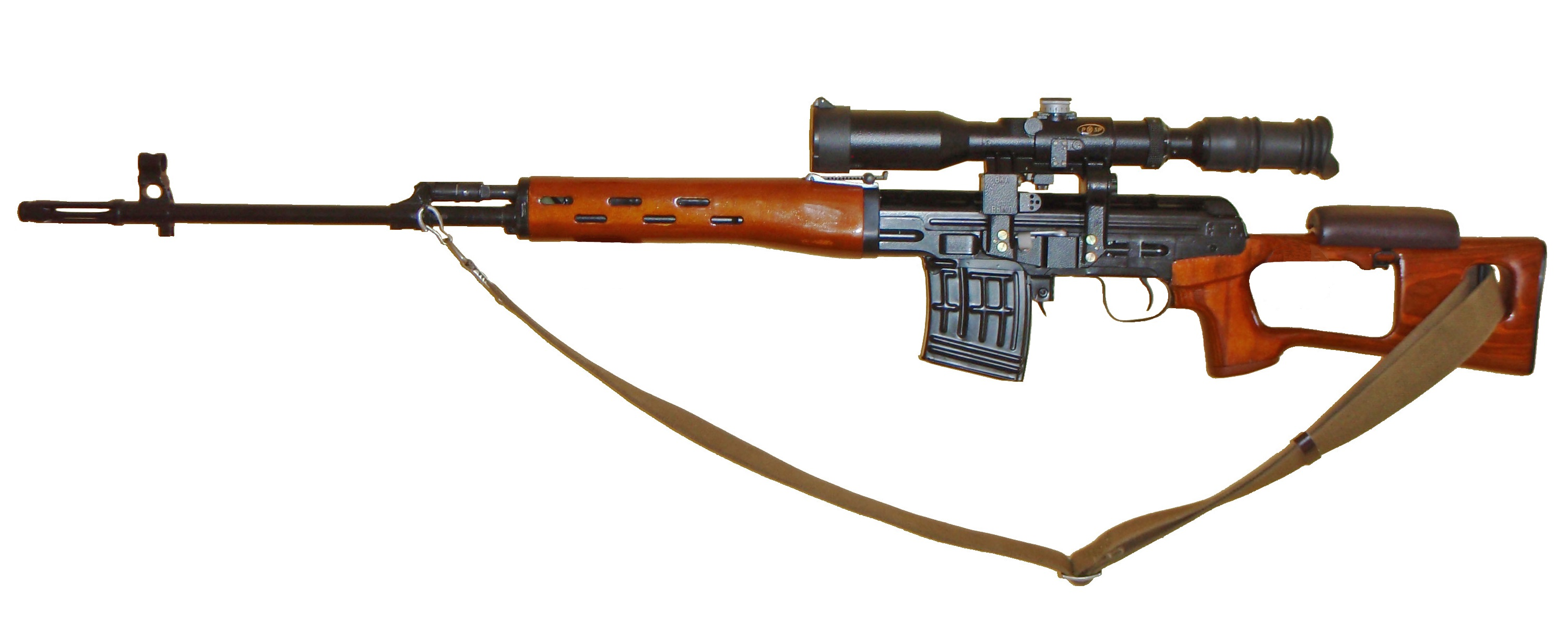
Dragunov SVD-63 sniper rifle

- Dragunov SVD-63 sniper rifle

==== Submachine guns ====
- Sa 23 and 25
- Halcón ML-60
- M3A1 "Grease gun"
- Carl Gustaf m/45: Egyptian-produced version, dubbed the "Port Said".
- Steyr MPi 69
- Star Model Z62
- Uzi

==== Machine guns ====
- RPK: Versions used included the Yugoslav and Romanian types.
- RPD
- PKM
- Heckler & Koch HK21: Captured
- M60: Captured
- FN MAG: Captured
- M2HB: Captured

==== Grenade systems ====
- F1
- RG-42
- RGD-5
- RKG-3

=== Explosive devices ===
- TNT explosive charge

=== Land mine systems ===
- "Fan mine" (Spanish: mina abanico): home-made anti-personnel mine, similar in design to the M18 Claymore.
- "Clothespin mine" (Spanish: mina de chuchitos): home-made anti-personnel mine.
- "Foot remover mine" (Spanish: mina de pateos or quita pata): home-made anti-personnel mine.

=== Anti-tank rocket and grenade launchers ===
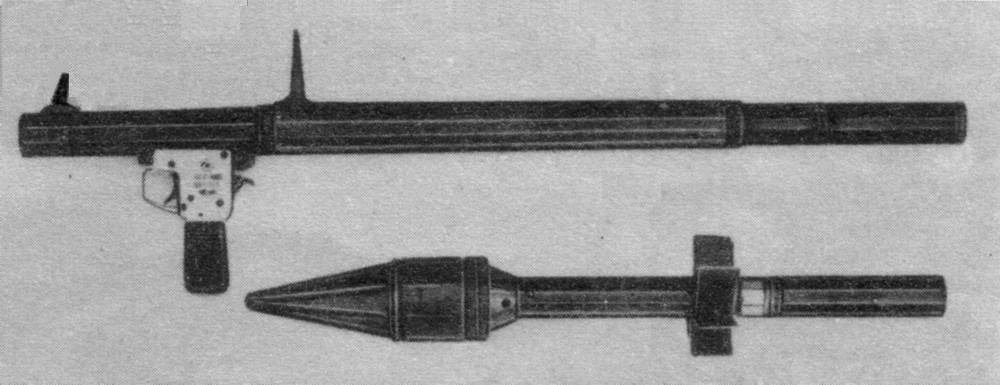
RPG-2 antitank grenade launcher with PG-2 grenade

- RPG-2: Mainly the Chinese Type 56 version
- RPG-7
- RPG-18
- M79 grenade launcher
- M26 grenade launcher

=== Recoilless rifles ===
- M67 recoilless rifle: Captured
- SPG-9 73 mm

=== Anti-aircraft weapons ===
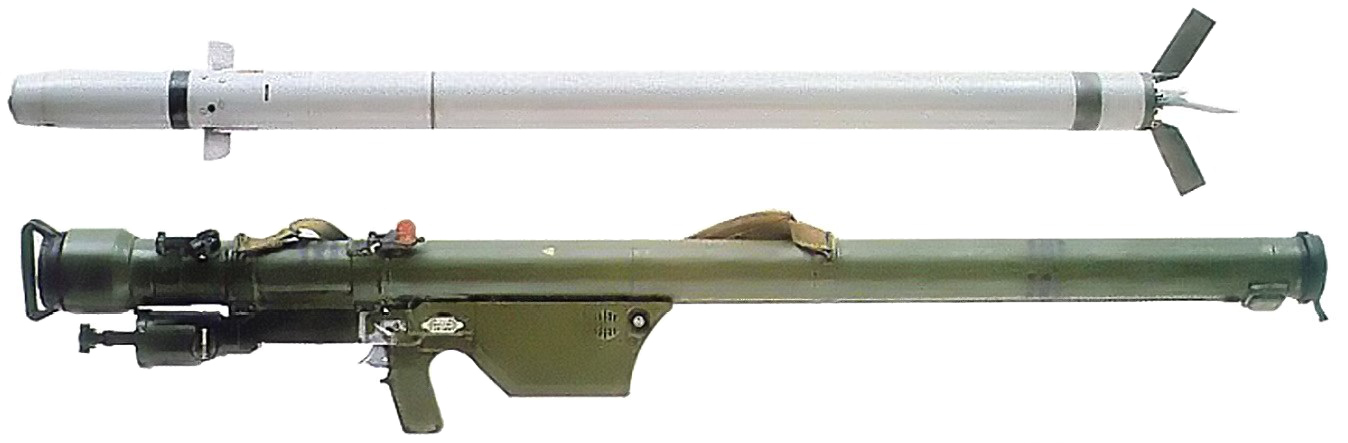
KBM Kolomna 9K32M Strela-2M (SA-7b) missile and canister.

- SA-7 Grail surface-to-air missile
- SA-14 Gremlin surface-to-air missile
- SA-16 Gimlet surface-to-air missile
- FIM-43 Redeye surface-to-air missile

== See also ==
- Guatemalan Civil War
- National Guard (Nicaragua)
- Nicaraguan Revolution
- Salvadoran Civil War
