= M52 rifle grenade =

Cold War-era French rifle grenade

M52
- Type: Rifle grenade
- Place of origin: France

Service history
- Used by: French Army

Production history
- Designed: 1950

Specifications
- Mass: 500 g (18 oz)
- Length: 270 mm (11 in)
- Diameter: 34 mm (1.3 in)
- Maximum firing range: 400 m (440 yd)

The Modèle 1952 34mm HE rifle grenade was in French service from 1952 to 1978. It was used alongside the APAV40 rifle grenade in French service. It was propelled by being mounted atop a rifle's 22 mm grenade launching adapter, and being launched by a ballistite (blank) cartridge.

In common with other rifle grenades of this era, they became obsolescent when the bullet trap form of propulsion became popular at the end of the 1970s.

The Yugoslavian M60 anti-personnel grenade, similarly launched from a rifle's 22 mm grenade launching adapter by a ballistite cartridge, bears a strong resemblance.

== Sources and references ==
French army manual on rifle grenades dated 1966 with an illustration of the Modèle 1952 and text on pages 21 to 22
