= Medieval stained glass =

Coloured and painted glass of medieval Europe

Medieval stained glass is the colored and painted glass of medieval Europe from the 10th century to the 16th century. For much of this period stained glass windows were the major pictorial art form, particularly in northern France, Germany and England, where windows tended to be larger than in southern Europe (in Italy, for example, frescos were more common). In some countries, such as Sweden and England, only a small number of original stained windows have survived to this day.

Stained glass windows were used predominantly in churches, but were also found in wealthy domestic settings and public buildings such as town halls, though surviving examples of secular glass are rather rare in comparison. Stained glass windows were used in churches to enhance their beauty and to inform the viewer through narrative or symbolism. The subject matter was generally religious in churches, though "portraits" and heraldry were often included.

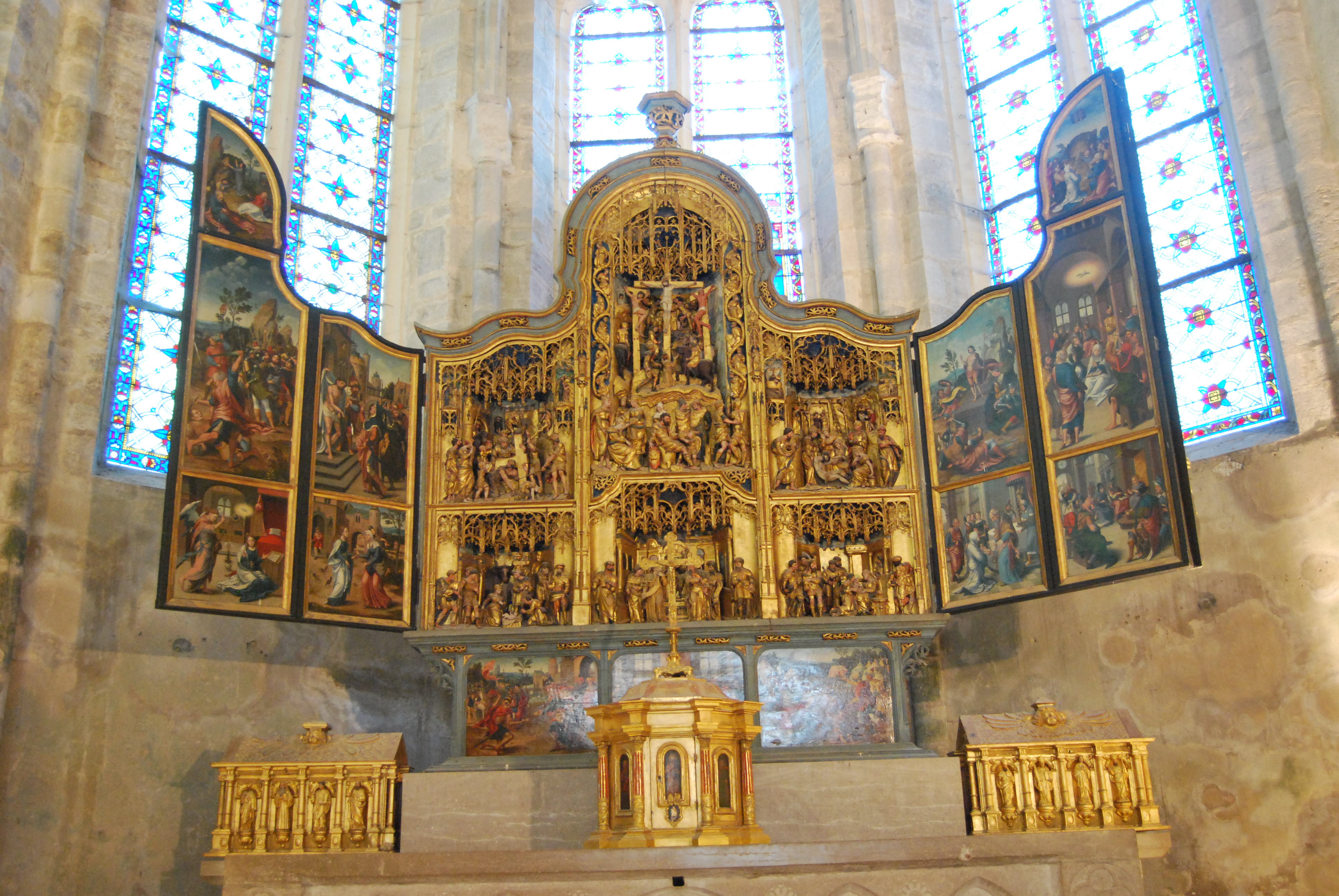
Baume-les-Messieurs Monastery stained glass windows

== History ==
=== Early stained glass ===
Window glass was recorded as being in use as early as the 8th century CE with colored window glass displayed in religious buildings. One of the earliest known examples of stained glass is from the Baume-Les-Messieurs abbey in Jura, France, which showcases large stained glass windows surrounding an altar. The Baume-Les-Messieurs Monastery provided the framework for the stained glass of the early medieval period.

The glass in early middle ages was simple and mostly used in small amounts, often alongside other materials like mosaics. The thick opaque glass consisted of basic colors such as red, blue, and green, creating geometric designs instead of detailed pictures. The glass was made from heating sand, lime, and soda ash in a furnace which created a murky color that limited light exposure.

Early stained glass windows were not only decorative but also educational. They conveyed biblical stories and moral lessons to largely illiterate people. This made the church more inclusive and able to reach a broader range of people.

=== Romanesque stained glass ===
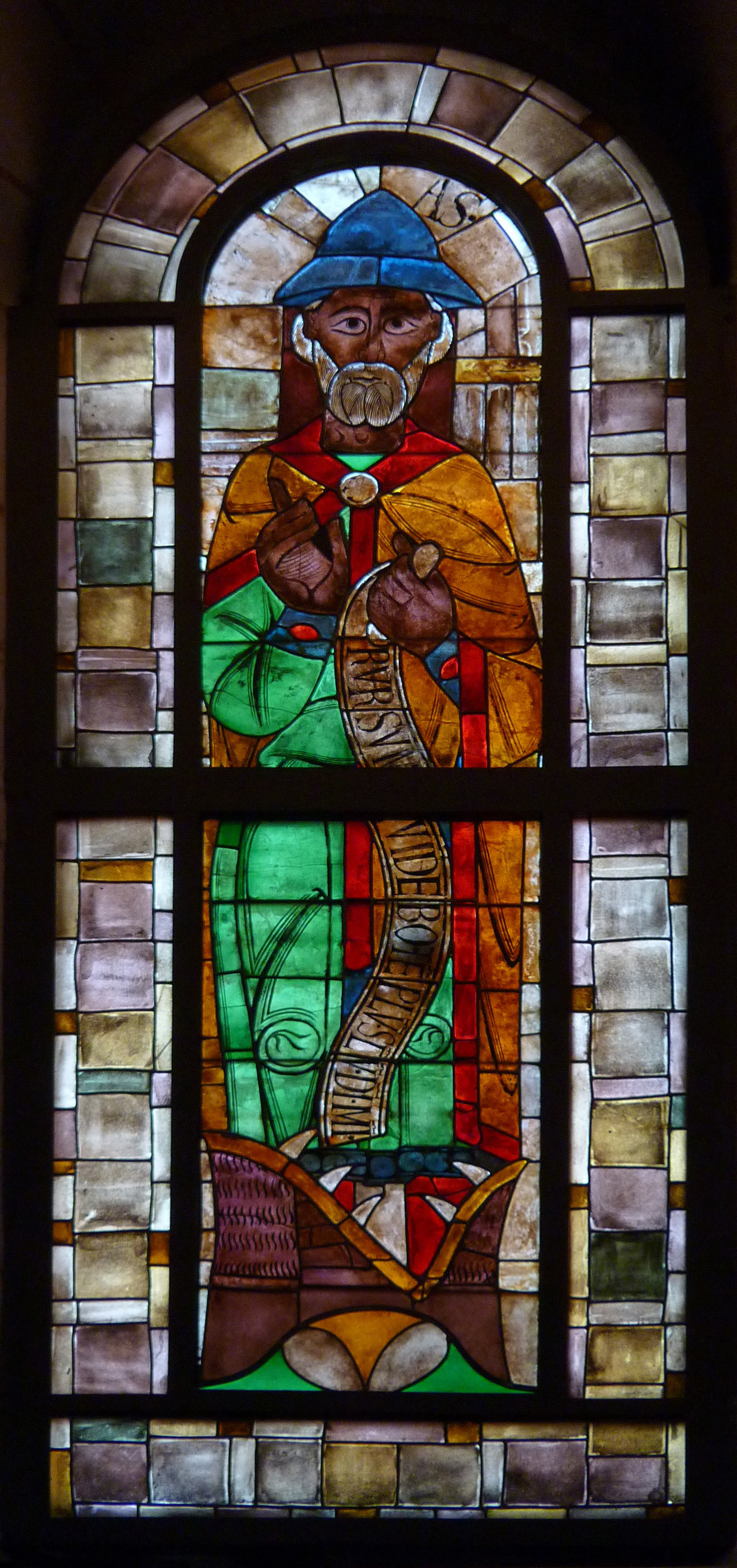
The Prophet Jonah (c. 1130), part of a set of five Prophet Windows in Augsburg Cathedral. They are widely considered the oldest stained glass windows in the world still surviving in situ.

The Romanesque period began in the 11th and 12th century with the revival of Roman architecture. The revival combined traditions of Roman architecture with stained glass. Eventually, Romanesque stained glass became its own entity, developing into a new style. This new style was used in Romanesque style churches throughout Europe.

Romanesque stained glass windows were often smaller and made from thick, colorful glass, with bold lines that formed simple, clear images. The glass pieces were held together by thick lead strips, creating a graphic and sometimes blocky appearance compared to later styles. The windows often showed scenes from the Bible and the lives of saints.

While there are not many surviving examples of Romanesque stained glass, some can still be found in churches like Saint-Denis in Normandy and Saint-Sernin in Toulouse. This style of stained glass influenced the later Gothic style, which had larger windows and thinner glass. Although Gothic stained glass became more famous for its detailed and intricate designs, Romanesque stained glass played a key role in shaping stained glass art and spreading religious messages.

=== Later stained glass ===
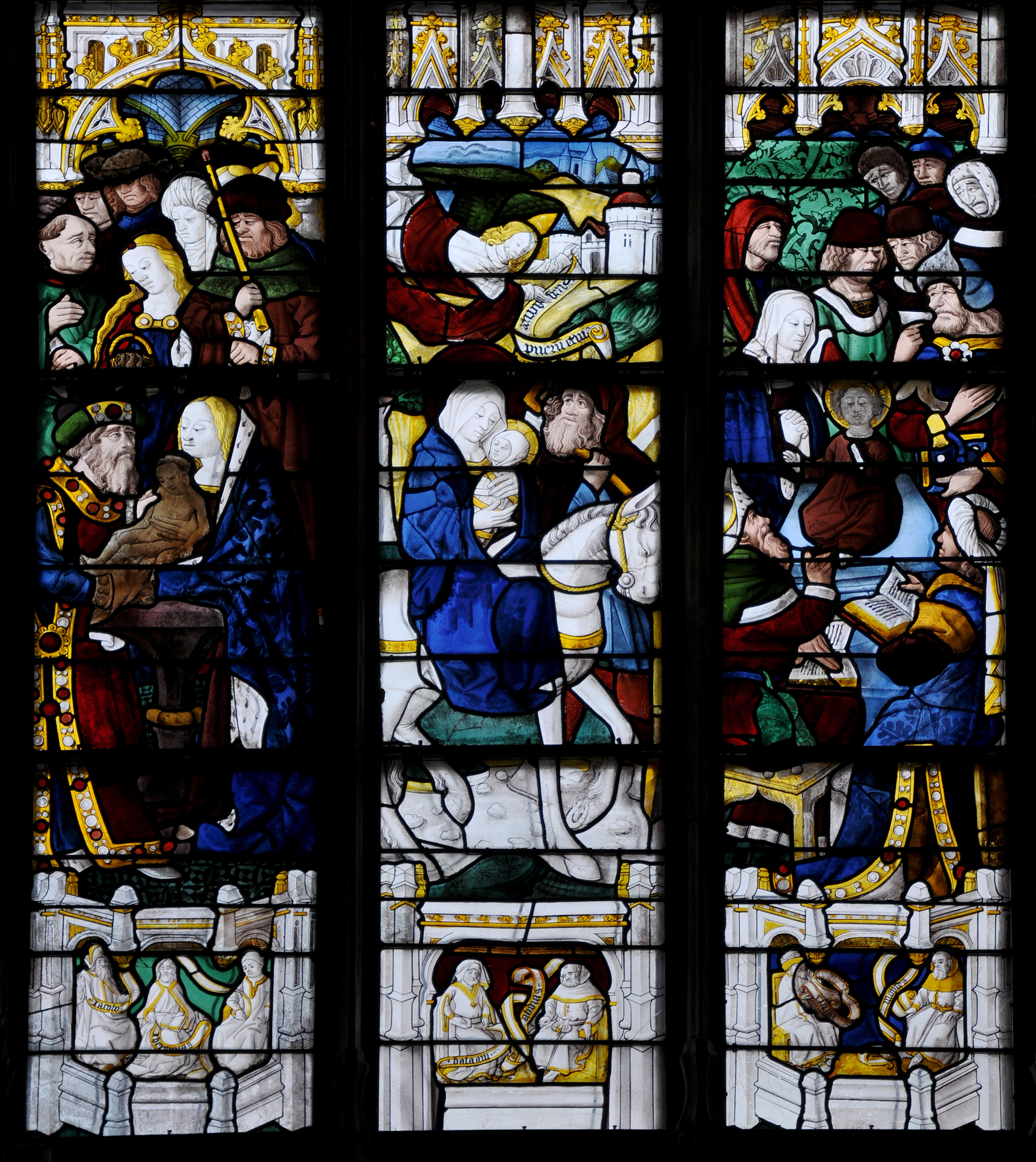
Gothic-era stained glass window located in the Evreux Cathedral in France

The late medieval period, often referred to as the Gothic Era, ranged from the 14th to the 16th century and marked a significant evolution in stained glass artistry. This era saw advancements in both the technical aspects of glassmaking and the complexity of window designs.

The most significant change in stained glass from the Romanesque to the Gothic Era was the increased use of glass painting techniques, which allowed for greater detail and narrative depth in the imagery. Artists began to employ more refined methods of shading and highlighting, enhancing the three-dimensionality of figures depicted in the glass. Glassmakers experimented with different additives and firing techniques to create a wider range of colors. These colors included rich purples, deep blues, and vibrant greens. These new colors added depth and richness to the stained glass windows, further enhancing their visual impact.

This new technique is seen in the Evreux Cathedral in France. The Cathedral began development in the 13th century and was not finished until the 17th century. The glass making took place in the 14th and 15th centuries and exemplified the stained glass of the late middle ages. The stained glass portrayed Christ and the Virgin Mary in a more three dimensional form than earlier stained glass designs. Each panel of glass depicts Jesus and Mary in the bible that had not previously been seen in three dimensional form on glass windows.

== Composition, manufacture and distribution ==
Prior to c. 1000, most coloured glass was of a soda-lime-silica composition. In Northern Europe soda glass was eventually almost totally superseded by potash-lime-silica glass (Forest glass). Forest glass continued to be used in stained glass for the duration of the medieval period until soda glass again began to be used in the 16th century.

The potash (K_{2}O) found in Forest Glass was derived from wood ash. In De diversis artibus, Theophilusdescribes the use of beech wood as the preferred source of ash. Other plant matter, such as bracken, was also used. As well as containing potash, beech ash comprises an assortment of compounds including iron and manganese oxides, which are particularly important for generating colour in glass.

Medieval stained glass panels could be created either by the cylinder blown sheet or crown glass (window) method. Forest glass was manufactured in Burgundy and Lorraine near the Rhein; in Flanders; and in Normandy, in the Seine and Loire Valleys. It was distributed throughout mainland north-west Europe and Britain in the form of ready-made sheets. The application of painted decoration to and final shaping of the sheets was carried out at glass working centres close by the final destination of the glass.

=== Color ===
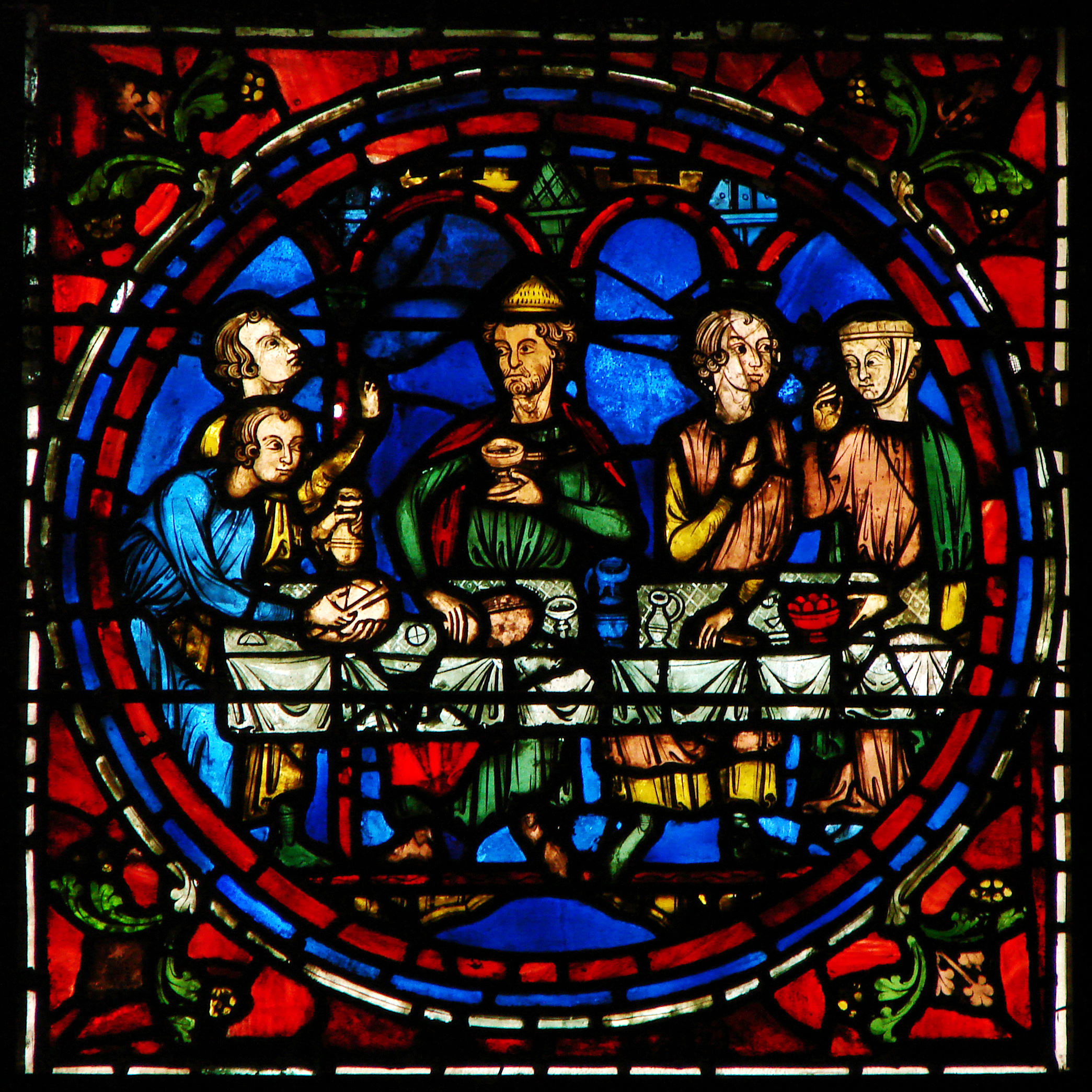
Detail of a panel from Chartres Cathedral.

The color of glass could be affected by many factors. Sources of silica were often impure, with iron oxide being one of the most common impurities. The greenish hue of uncolored glass is usually owing to the presence of a mixture of ferrous (Fe^{2+}) and ferric (Fe^{3+}) ions in the glass matrix. It is also possible that 'impurities' could be introduced at the fritting stage within the glass furnace, leading to the addition of further alumina, silica and iron oxides.

==== Inherent color ====
Inherent color refers to the colors that may be formed in the molten glass by manipulating the furnace environment. Theophilus describes molten glass changing to a "saffron yellow color" which will eventually transform to a reddish yellow on further heating, he also refers to a "tawny color, like flesh" which, upon further heating will become "a light purple" and later "a reddish purple, and exquisite".

These color changes are the result of the behaviour, under redox conditions, of the iron and manganese oxides which are naturally present in beech wood ash.

In the glass melt the iron and manganese behave as follows:

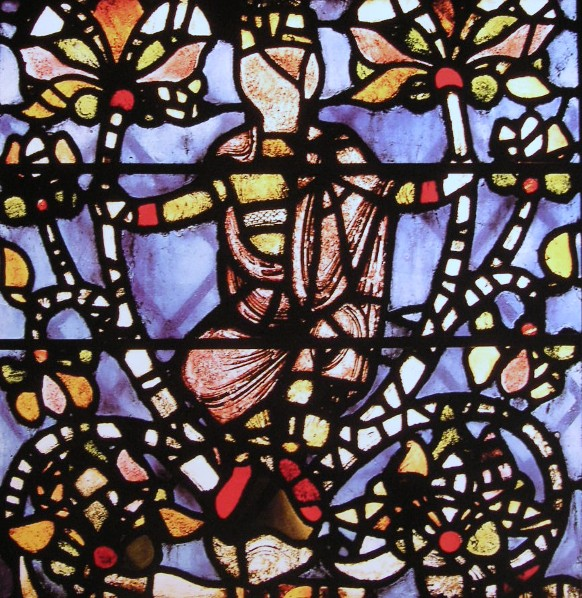
Detail of the Jesse Tree panel from York Minster, circa 1170.

In an oxidising environment metal (and some non-metal) ions will lose electrons. In iron oxides, Fe^{2+} (ferrous) ions will become Fe^{3+} (ferric) ions. In molten glass this will result in a change in glass colour from pale blue to yellow/brown. In a reducing environment the iron will gain electrons and color will change from yellow/brown to pale blue. Similarly manganese will change in colour depending on its oxidation state. The lower oxidation state of manganese (Mn^{2+}) is yellow in common glass while the higher oxidation states (Mn^{3+} or higher) is purple. A combination of the two states will give a pink glass.

As the manganese and iron may each be in different states of oxidation, the combination of the two can result in a broad range of attractive colors. Manganese in its fully oxidised state, if not present in too great a mass, will also act as a decolorant of glass if the iron is in its yellow, ferric form. The two colors in effect cancel each other out to produce a clear glass.

Experimental manufacture of potash glass emulating Theophilus' recipes has resulted in colors ranging from colorless to yellow, amber, brown, green, blue, pink and purple. Variation in color hue and depth would also probably be affected by the source of the beech wood ash, depending on the soil chemistry where the beech tree grew, the age of the tree and the climate conditions.

Some of the stronger reds, blues and greens that are a feature of medieval stained glass rely on the addition of copper oxides.

==== Deliberately added colorants ====
Heraclius' De coloribus et artibus Romanorum includes instructions for creating green and red glass by adding copper (probably in the form of ore or copper filings) to the batch, a method practiced since ancient times. (The chapters on how to make red, green and blue glass are missing from De diversis artibus.) As with the iron/manganese colors, the colors formed by the addition of copper oxide to the glass are dependent on the different oxidation states of the added copper. In an oxidising environment blue cupric (Cu^{2+}) ions are formed, in a strongly reducing environment red colloidal cuprous (Cu^{1+}) oxide is formed and if reoxidised then green cuprous (Cu^{1+}) oxide results.

The production of bright reds and blues in particular was straightforward, as the addition of copper to the mix resulted in the reliable creation of red, blue and green. The dominance of red and blue in Romanesque and Gothic glass is obvious. However, at York Minster, for example, it was demonstrated that 90% of the medieval glass was coloured by means of iron/manganese content.

==== Medieval blue soda glass ====
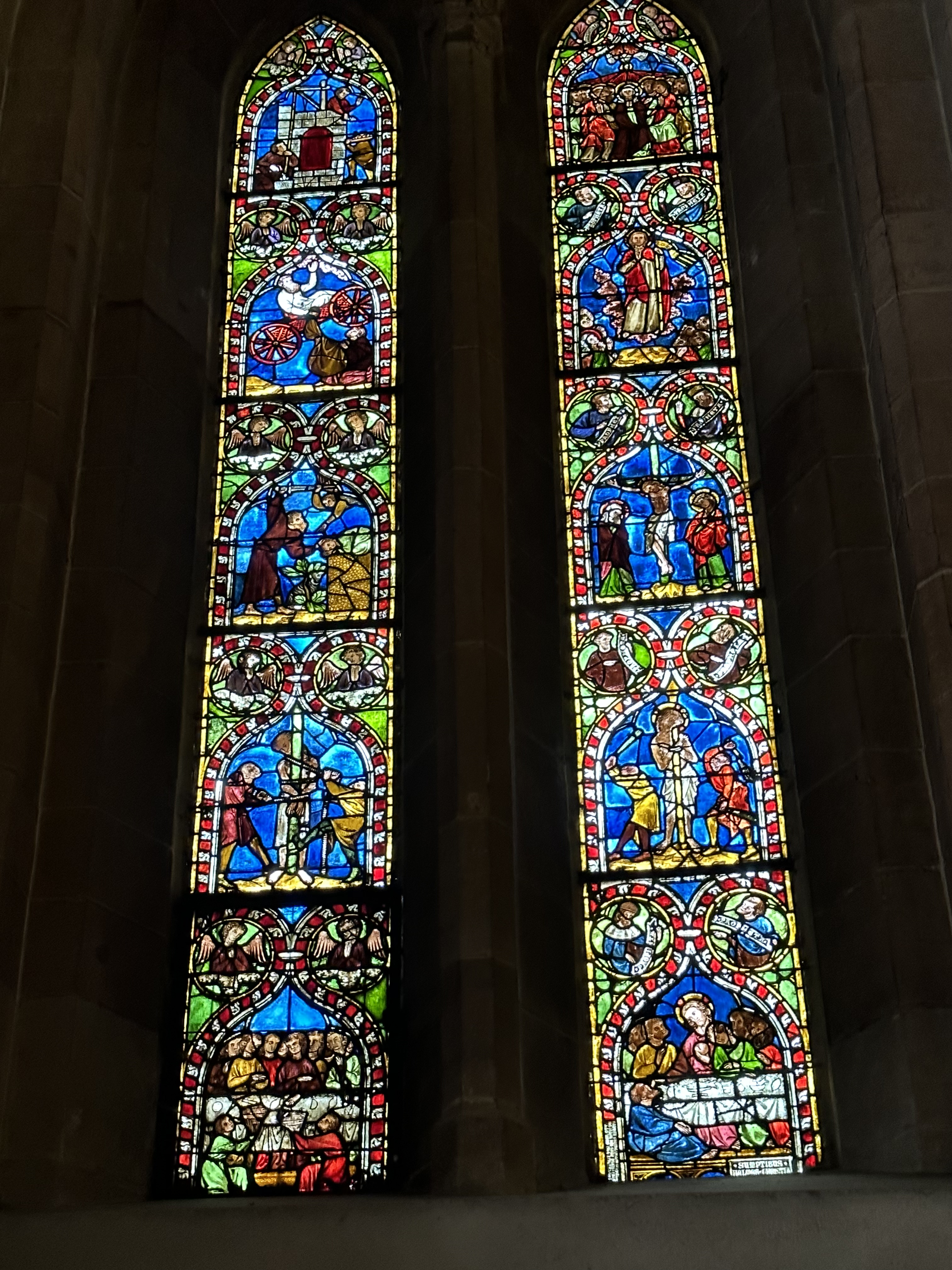
Stained Glass-Saint Martin Church of Colmar, France 01

Early medieval glass was soda-based, and although the use of soda glass in Northern Europe was almost wholly superseded by forest glass after c. 1000, there are some examples of a richly colored blue glass (identified through XRF analysis) that was produced in the medieval period using soda as the alkali. In the UK, a considerable quantity of blue soda glass has been identified in stained glass from the Five Sisters window at York Minster, and in excavations at Old Sarum and Winchester. In France, in Chartres Cathedral and St Denis in Paris, soda glass has also been found, and no doubt there must be many other examples.

Evidence of recycling Roman tesserae to produce window glass in the 9th century has been identified at the Benedictine Monastery of San Vincenzo, Molise, Italy. Theophilus, in the 12th century, was also aware of such practice. He states that mosaic tesserae: 'little square stones' from 'ancient pagan buildings' along with 'various small vessels in the same colors' could be used to produce glass: 'they even melt the blue in their furnaces, adding a little of the clear white to it, and they make from it blue glass sheets which are costly and very useful in windows.' According to Theophilus, the French were particularly skilled at this process.

Cox suggests that the examples analysed at York could indeed be 'Roman, or slightly later, glass re-melted in France and imported into England'.

==== Flashing ====
Glass comprising multiple layers of clear and (usually) red glass was known to exist in the 12th and 13th centuries. The manufacturing process is not known. Flashing was developed in the 15th century, and refers to the superimposition of a thin layer of colored glass onto another colored or uncolored glass sheet. The procedure may have involved dipping a small sphere of molten glass into a molten uncolored glass and blowing this into a cylinder form (the cylinder blown sheet process) which was then cut into sections and flattened in an annealing oven. Red, or ruby, copper-based glass, is usually flashed as the colour is too dense to be used alone. Other glass colors may also be flashed. These techniques could be remarkably sophisticated as demonstrated by 15thc. glass from the Carthusian Monastery of Pavia, where layered glasses of blue and violet; green and uncolored; and red and uncolored have been identified.

=== Applied paint and silver stain ===
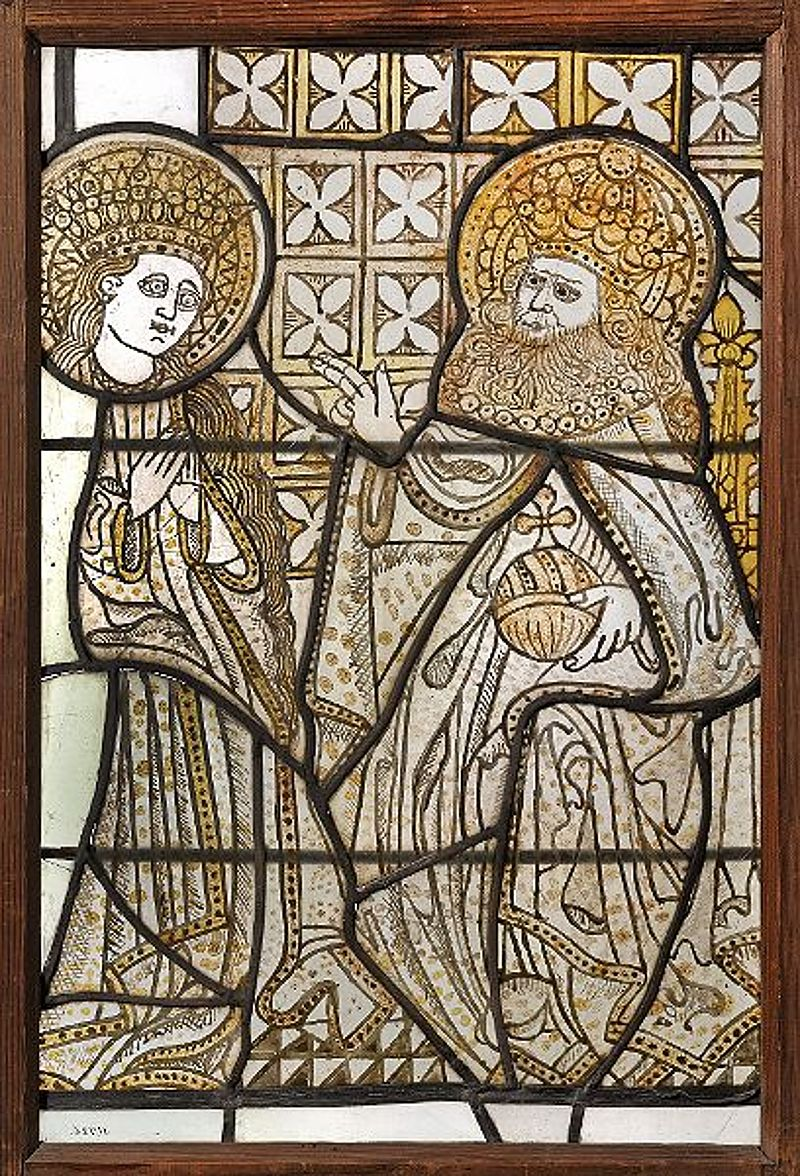
The Coronation of the Virgin from Torsång Church, Sweden, demonstrating the use of silver stain.

==== Paint ====
The paint applied to glass was a type of enamel, usually dark brown or black, formed from a mixture of: ground copper or iron oxide; powdered glass; wine, urine or vinegar; and gum arabic. Other recipes could include sugar, treacle or vegetable oil. This 'paint' was applied in a series of washes, with fine details added last. Both the external and internal faces of the glass could be painted, adding depth to the overall composition. The enamel was fixed by 'firing' the glass in an annealing oven.

==== Silver stain ====
Producing a strong clear yellow could be difficult in early stained glass as it relied upon the careful control of furnace conditions in order to create the appropriate reducing or oxidising environment. The introduction of silver stain in the early 14th century not only provided a solution to this difficulty, but also allowed greater flexibility in the way in which color could be used. The first datable example of the use of silver stain is in the parish church of Le Mesnil-Villeman, Manche, France (1313). Silver stain was a combination of silver nitrate or silver sulphide blended with pipe clay and applied to (usually) clear glass. This technique enabled a more flexible approach to glass painting, allowing, for example, the hair of a figure to be painted on the same piece of glass as the head. It was also used to highlight details of canopywork or grisaille, and later it was added to the surface of coloured glass, to create a wider variety of glass hues.

== See also ==
- French Gothic stained glass windows
- English Gothic stained glass windows
- Stained glass conservation
- British and Irish stained glass (1811–1918)
- Medieval stained glass in Sweden

== Bibliography ==
- Azzoni, C. B., Di Martino, D., Marchesi, V., Messiga. B., Riccardi, M. P., (2005). Colour Attributes of Medieval Window Panes: Electron Paramagnetic Resonance and Probe Microanalyses on Stained Glass Windows from Pavia Carthusian Monastery. Archaeometry 47/2, 381–388.
- Cox, G. A., Gillies, K. J. S., 1986. The X-Ray Fluorescence Analysis of Medieval Durable Blue Soda Glass from York Minster. Archaeometry, 28/1, 57–68.
- Cramp, R. J., 1975. Window Glass From the Monastic Site of Jarrow: Problems of Interpretation. Journal of Glass Studies, 17, 88–96.
- Davison, S., 2003. Conservation and Restoration of Glass. Oxford: Butterworth-Heinemann.
- Freestone, I. 1992. Theophilus and the Composition of Medieval Glass, Materials Issues in Art and Archaeology III, Pittsburgh, Pennsylvania: Materials Research Society, 739–745.
- Hawthorne, J. G., Smith, C. S. (eds), 1979.Theophilus: On Divers Arts. New York: Dover.
- Henderson, J. 1992. Early medieval glass technology: the calm before the storm. In S. Jennings and A. Vince (eds) Medieval Europe 1992: Volume 3 Technology and Innovation, 175–179.
- Heyworth, M., 1992. Evidence for Early Medieval Glass Working. In S. Jennings and A. Vince (eds) Medieval Europe 1992: Volume 3 Technology and Innovation, 169–174.
- Marks, R., 1993. Stained Glass in England During the Middle Ages. London: Routledge.
- Newton, R., and Davison, S., 1997, Conservation of Glass, Butterworth–Heinemann, Oxford.
- Royce-Roll, D., 1994. The Colors of Romanesque Stained Glass. Journal of Glass Studies,36, 71–80.
- Smedley, J., W., Jackson, C. M., Booth, C.A., 1998. Back to the Roots: The Raw Materials, Glass Recipes and Glassmaking Practices of Theophilus. In: McCray, P. (ed). The Prehistory and History of Ancient Glassmaking, 145–165.
- Stern, W. B., and Gerber, Y., 2004, Potassium-Calcium Glass: New Data and Experiments. Archaeometry 46/1, 137–156.
