= Forest glass =

Type of glass produced in medieval Europe

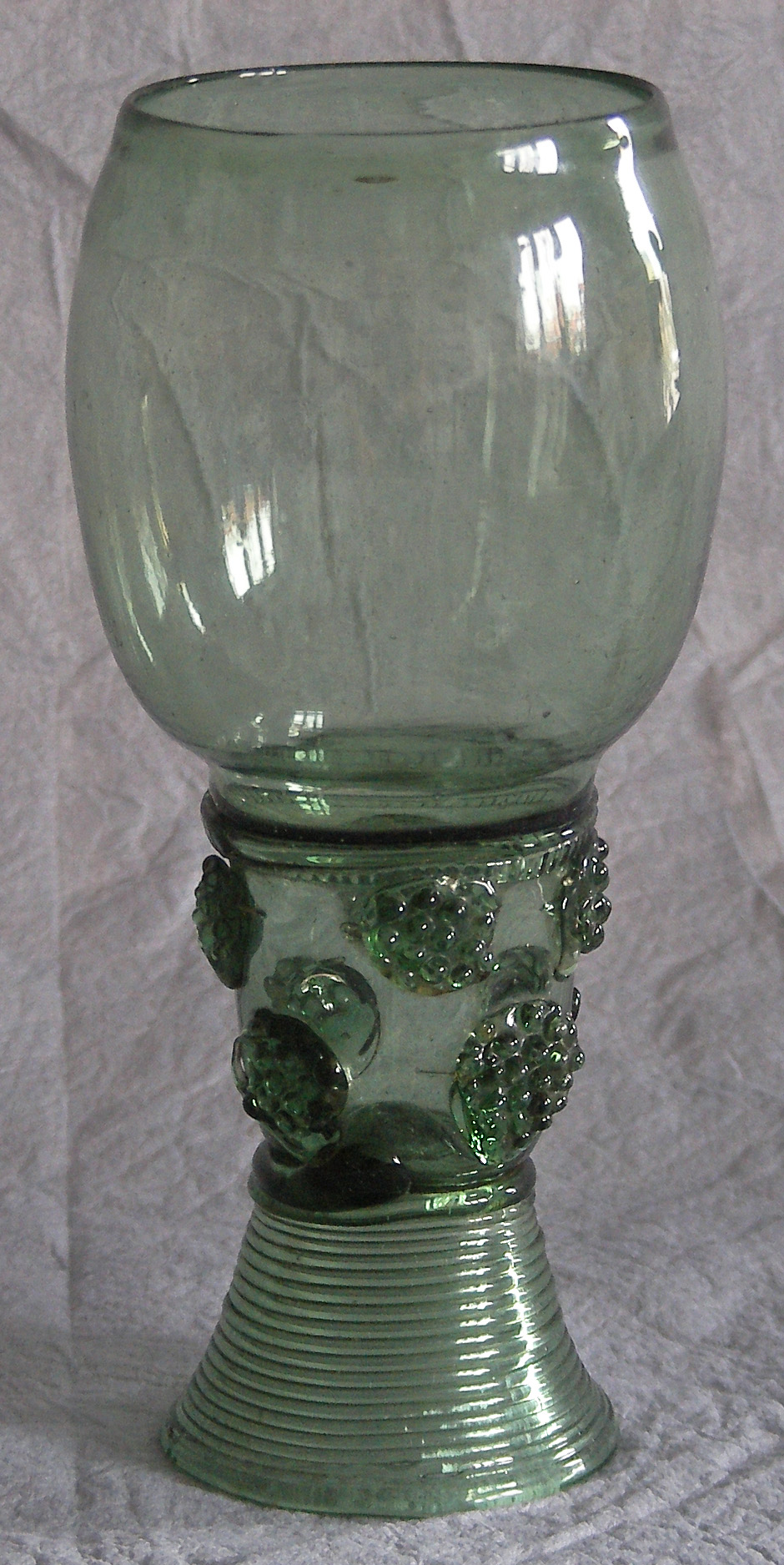
German drinking glass of the 17th century

Forest glass (German: Waldglas) is a type of medieval glass produced in northwestern and central Europe from approximately 1000–1700 AD using wood ash and sand as the main raw materials and made in factories known as glasshouses in forest areas. It is characterized by a variety of greenish-yellow colors, the earlier products often being of crude design and poor quality, and was used mainly for everyday vessels and increasingly for ecclesiastical stained glass windows. Its composition and manufacture contrast sharply with Roman and pre-Roman glassmaking, centered on Mediterranean and contemporaneous Byzantine and Islamic glassmaking to the east.

== History ==
While under Roman rule, the raw materials and manufacturing methods of northern Europe were those of the Roman tradition, using the mineral natron. For several centuries after the fall of the Western Roman Empire, around 450 AD, recycling of Roman glass formed the major part of the local industry and glassmaking skills declined. As the Carolingian Empire expanded in northwestern Europe approximately 800 AD, its demand for glass increased but the supply of traditional raw materials was costly and sporadic. An imperial desire to surpass the product quality of the declining Byzantine Empire and the Islamic Empire led to experimentation with new raw materials and the development of a new glassmaking technology.

Archaeologically, numerous medieval glasshouses have been found in western and central Europe, particularly in the mountains of Germany. Due to later reuse of the building material, most are poorly preserved, but there is evidence that both glassmaking and working were often done on the same site.

== Glassmaking ==
It is important to distinguish between glassmaking from raw materials and glass working, which is the production of finished articles by melting pieces of raw glass or cullet which may have been made elsewhere or by recycling old glass. Glass consists of four principal components:

1. A former – to provide the network of atoms forming the matrix of the glass. This is silica (SiO_{2}), which in ancient times was added as crushed quartz, and from Roman times onwards in the form of sand.
2. An alkali flux – to lower the temperature at which the silica melts, making it achievable using currently available working temperatures. In ancient times, the ash of sodium-rich plants growing in arid areas around the eastern Mediterranean provided soda (Na_{2}CO_{3}) as flux. In Roman times the mineral natron was used, a naturally occurring mixture of alkaline sodium salts, sourced from the Wadi El Natrun area of Egypt. Post-Roman Islamic glassmakers reverted to using sodium-rich plant ash, while in Northern Europe, a method using ash from wood was developed to provide potash (K_{2}CO_{3}) as flux. Calcium oxide (lime, CaO) can also act as a flux.
3. A stabiliser – to stop the glass dissolving in water and increase corrosion resistance. The most effective is lime (CaO) but alumina (Al_{2}O_{3}) and magnesia (MgO) can achieve this to some effect. These minerals may already be present in varying quantities in sand.
4. A colourant or opacifier – These can be naturally present in the glass due to impurities in the raw materials or can be deliberately added to the melted glass as minerals or as slag from metalworking processes. The most important contributions are from iron, copper, cobalt, manganese, tin, antimony, and lead. Opacity can be due to bubbles in the glass or the inclusion of opacifying agents such as tin and antimony. The resulting colour and opacity from a given composition also may be controlled by the temperature and redox conditions inside the furnace.

== Chemistry ==
In post-Roman times political problems in the Wadi El Natrun area disrupted the supply of natron so alternatives had to be developed. Eastern glassmakers reverted to using sodium-rich plant ash and for a while supplied southern Europe, using existing Roman trade routes. The Venetian glassmakers, who had inherited Roman glassmaking skills, monopolised the trade in plant ash and banned craftsmen from working outside the city. The remainder of Europe, north of the Alps, had to find another way of producing glass. The former and stabiliser components of glass occur in all regions as sand or quartz and as lime of various forms. The northern Europeans experimented with ash from wood, ferns and bracken as a source of the alkali flux. At its height the Roman glass industry was producing high quality, thin, colourless and clear glass of consistent composition. The earlier surviving Forest glass vessels are characterised by a wide variety of compositions and lower quality, often being greenish to brownish in colour, thick-walled, with inclusions and bubbles in the fabric. This suggests that using wood-ash was not merely a case of changing raw materials, but necessitated a whole new technology with attendant development problems.

Whereas Roman and earlier glass (of Si/Na/Ca composition) was of a marked uniformity over a wide area and centuries of time, the medieval glass (of Si/K/Ca composition) is characterised by a variety of compositions. This may be explained to some extent by examining how the melting temperature of glass depends on the relative proportions of its components, which for simplicity, are reduced to three. In practice glass contains many more components that complicate the system. The study of such ternary systems, together with analysis of trace elements is useful to archaeologists for establishing the provenance of glass.

It is believed that in pre-Medieval times the batch of raw materials was heated to a temperature where it partially melted, the unmelted parts removed and washed of non-reactive components, and added to the next batch. Because of the strong way that the Si/Na/Ca compositions affect the melting temperature, the resulting glass was of a fairly uniform composition regardless of the recipe of raw materials used. The melting temperatures of the Si/K/Ca glasses are not so strongly affected by composition, resulting in glasses of more varied composition, so the self-limiting features of the Na system that allowed the traditional partial-batch method to produce consistent compositions, ceased to apply, and a new way of controlling consistency had to be developed. The wide variety of compositions, together with historical accounts of glassmaking, suggest that the new method involved melting a complete batch of raw materials, removing the unreactive components as scum.

From approximately 1400 AD, in an effort to compete with the quality of Venetian glass, it was found that calcium oxide (CaO) added as flux to the sand-potash mix in the form of shells, limestone, or marble gave a clearer glass, by virtue of reducing the amount of potash required along with its attendant colorants.

== Comparative compositions ==
	Egyptian fifteenth century BC	Roman first century AD	European thirteenth century AD	Syrian fourteenth century AD	Modern
Silica, SiO_{2}	65	68	53	70	73
Soda, Na_{2}O	20	16	3	12	16
Potash, K_{2}O	2	0.5	17	2	0.5
Lime, CaO	4	8	12	10	5
Magnesia, MgO	4	0.5	7	3	3
Batch materials	plant ash quartz	natron sand	wood ash sand/quartz	plant ash sand/quartz	synthetic components

Typical compositions of some historical and ancient glasses - the components are given in weight per cent; in addition to those listed the ancient glasses also would have contained up to one per cent iron oxide and up to three per cent aluminium oxide, in addition to any colorants and opacifiers

== Control of colour ==
Experimenting with the new technology, the forest glassmakers found it difficult to achieve the high standards of clarity and colour of the Roman methods, due mainly to the great variability of colour-controlling elements in the raw materials. European sand and soil is generally higher in iron and manganese. Iron gives a blue-green tinge to glass under usual furnace atmosphere conditions, but also may give a yellow colour. Manganese has its own purple colour which may balance out the iron colour to make colourless glass. For instance, glass made from beech wood grown on meagre lime-rich soil (e.g. Kleinlutzel, Jura) is high in manganese and thus, nearly colourless while that in a clay-rich area (e.g. Court-Chalvet, Jura) is olive green. Thus, a variety of colours may be produced and experimentation allowed the glassmakers to progress from the early muddy green-yellow-brown colours toward clear-coloured and colourless glass. Local conditions allowed some areas to produce finer glass at an earlier stage. In Bohemia at the end of the 16th century the decolourising powers of manganese were used to produce a clear glass suitable for engraving. The amount of carbon left in the wood ash also may affect the colour of the glass by modifying the furnace atmosphere. The glass in York Minster has been shown to be 90% naturally coloured, without added colorants.

Other clear colours were produced by deliberate addition of metal oxides, often the byproducts of local metalworking; copper oxide to give green or turquoise, cobalt for strong blue. Red was particularly difficult to produce, using particles of copper under delicately-controlled redox conditions. There is little evidence of antimony- or tin-based opacifiers being used, or the use of lead to modify other colours.

== Operation of the glasshouse ==
There are only two historical descriptions of European glassmaking in medieval times. In 1120 Theophilus Presbyter, writing in Germany, gave detailed recipes and instructions and in 1530 Georgius Agricola wrote about current glassmaking. Other useful information comes from archaeological finds and experimental and theoretical reconstructions. However, in Thuringia, the Greiner Greiner and Mueller families founded Lauscha and several other glass huts.

=== Sourcing and collection of raw materials ===
The sand likely was collected from river beds, where it was relatively clean and of more uniform particle size. The felling, transporting, drying, and storage of wood both for ash production and as fuel for the furnaces was labour-intensive and required a high level of organization.

=== Preparation of ash ===
Theophilus recommends the use of beech logs, which analysis has shown has a high proportion of CaO when grown on calcareous soil. Whatever wood is used, the amount of potash and CaO it provides, as well as other components that might affect colour and opacity, varies considerably with the age and part of the tree, soil chemistry, climate, the time of year when the tree was cut and the dryness of the wood when burned, factors over which the glassmaker had little control. This variability explains the problems that glassmakers had in trying to produce glass of a consistent quality. Large amounts of ash would have to be prepared and mixed together to give the homogeneity needed to give a predictable glass composition. A typical yield of ash from beech is only about 1%, so using Theophilus' recipe of two parts of sand to one part of ash means it would take 63 kg of beech wood to produce one kilogram of glass. It has been estimated that, including fuel, 150–200 kg of wood would be needed per kilogram of glass.

=== Fritting ===
Then the prepared ash and sand were heated together, but not melted, at a relatively low temperature (up to about 900 °C or 1650 °F) in a process known as fritting. Theophilus specifies 'for the space of a day and night.' This process, which could be monitored by changes in colour as temperature increased, caused a decrease in volume, prior to charging crucibles for the final melting stage, thus minimising the number of times the furnace would need to be opened, and also, consolidating the light powdery ash that might blow about in the furnace causing contamination.

=== Melting ===
The final stage was to melt the fritted material in crucibles in a covered furnace to give molten glass. The furnace needed to operate at as high a temperature as possible since quick melting and the need for less flux improved the quality of glass. The change from natron to potash required an increase in melting temperature of about 200 °C to around 1350 °C, necessitating a fundamental change in furnace technology and the development of high-temperature ceramics. At this higher temperature, normal clay would react chemically with the glass.

=== Working ===
Once melted, the glass would be blown into vessels or into cylinders which then were opened into sheets for window glass. The final stage is to anneal the finished glass to avoid damage from shrinkage stresses.

== Furnace design ==
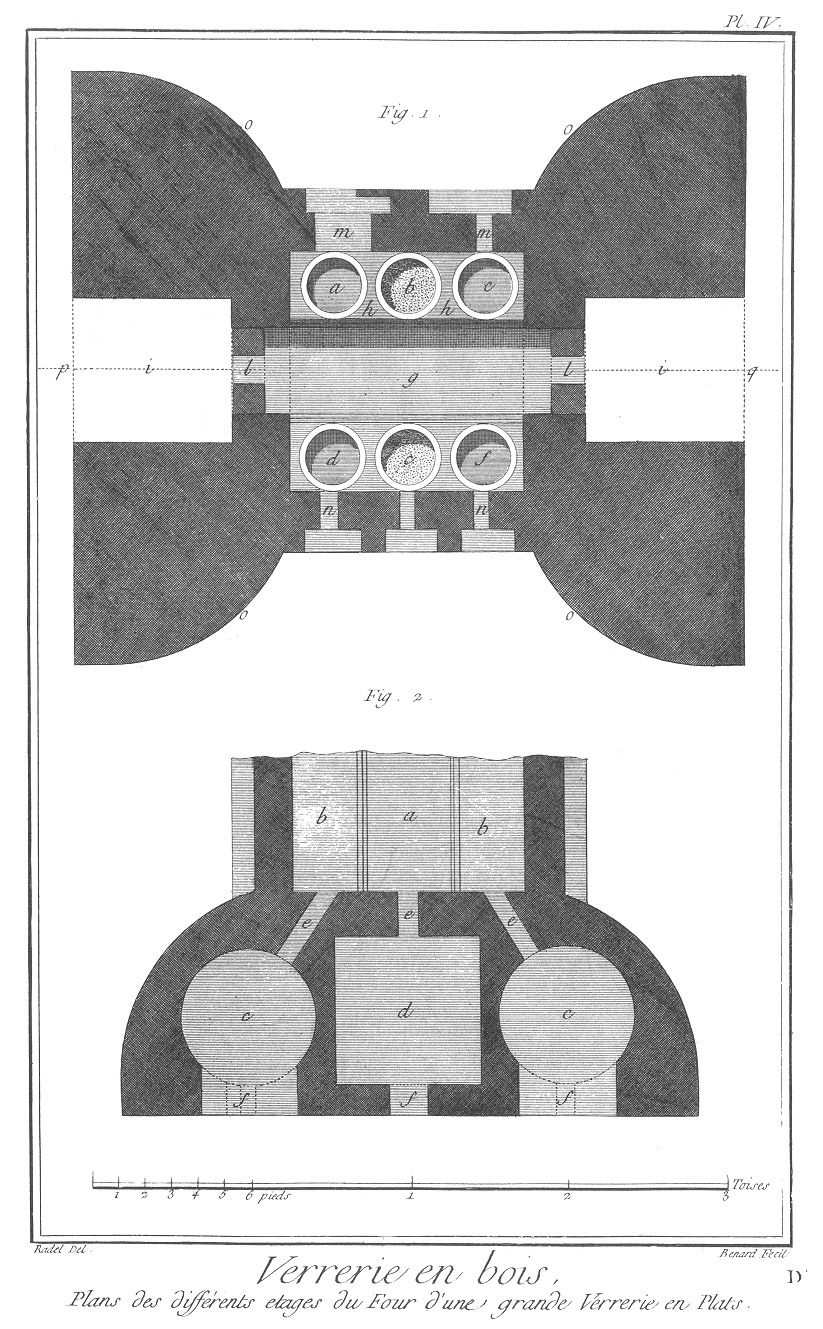
Butterfly design furnace

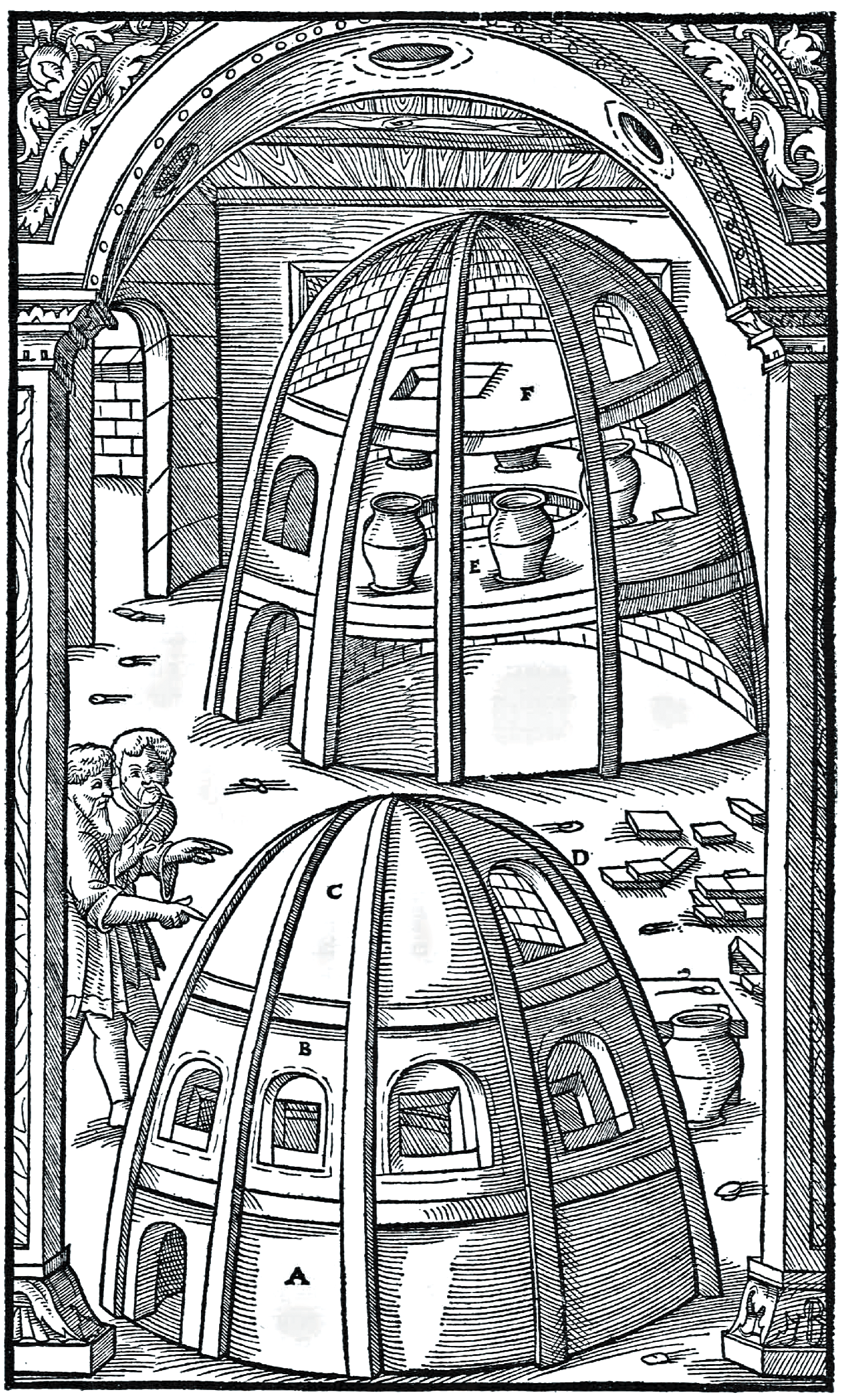
Beehive design furnace

Besides the descriptions of Theophilus and Agricola, the only depiction of an early forest glasshouse is from Bohemia in approximately 1380 (The Mandeville Miniature). This shows a furnace where all the high temperature processes of glassmaking were performed in the one structure containing several ovens whose varying temperatures might be controlled to the necessary extent by constant attention. The raw materials are mixed at a pit nearby and carried down in pans to be fritted in one of the ovens, optimum temperature up to 1100 °C. The frit is melted at high temperature up to 1400 °C in crucibles in a second oven, and when ready, the glass is being blown into objects. These are placed in the annealing oven to cool. The whole structure is enclosed in a wooden building, and it is likely that wood was stored and dried above the furnace. Remains of a similar structure from the late 15th century have been found in Eichsfeld in Germany. Another design found archaeologically from the 17th century is the 'butterfly furnace'. These furnaces were made from stone and the crucibles from imported, highly-refractory clay. They differ in style from the Islamic furnaces of the east, and those of southern Europe, the 'beehive' style where the annealing chamber is above the main oven rather than on the same level.

The furnace firing cycle would be optimised for fuel consumption, output, and humanpower, and as the technology improved, larger glasshouses operated on an almost continuous basis. It has been estimated that a large glasshouse typically might use 67 tonnes of wood a week operating for 40 weeks a year.

== Location of glasshouses ==
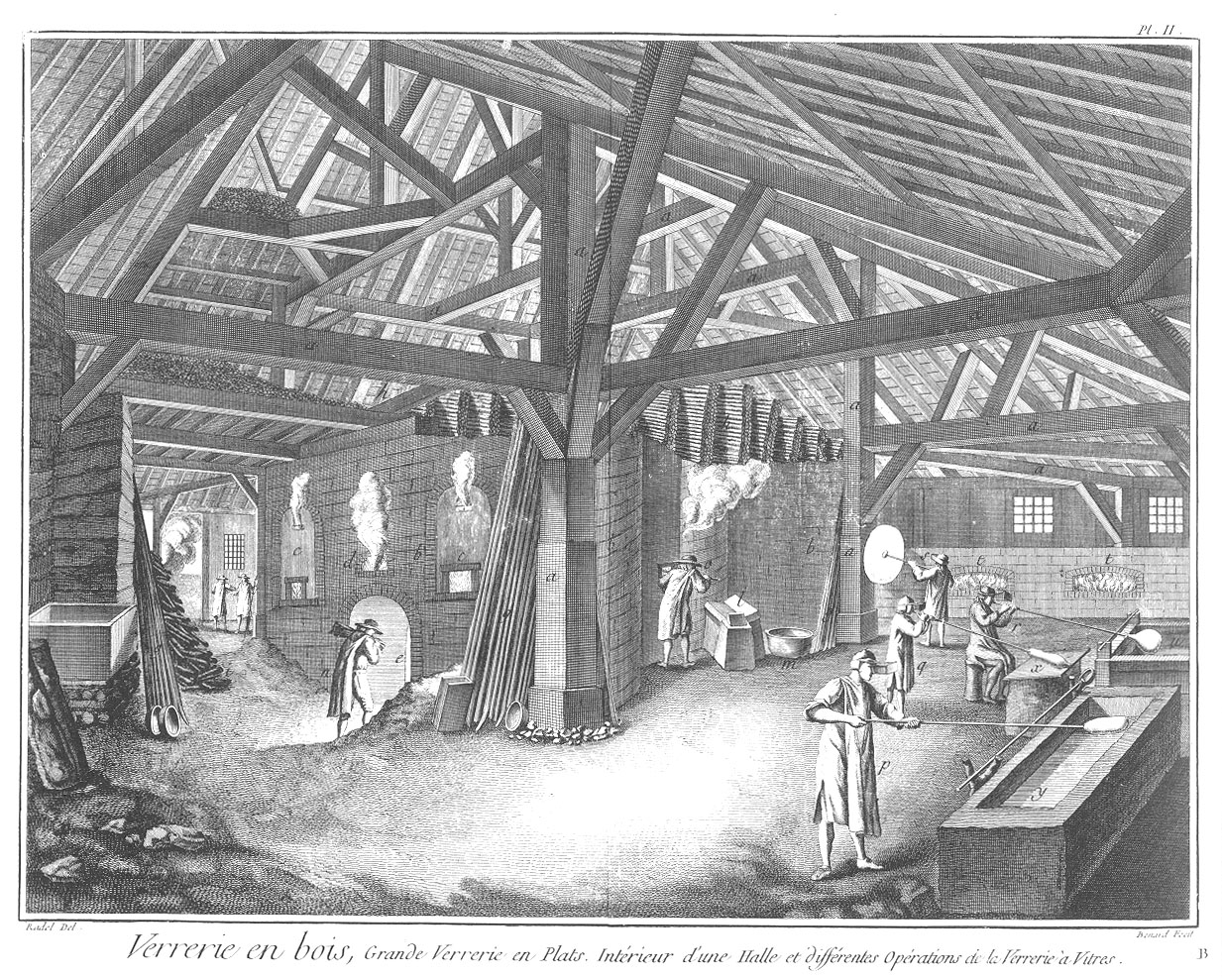
Forest glasshouse of eighteenth century

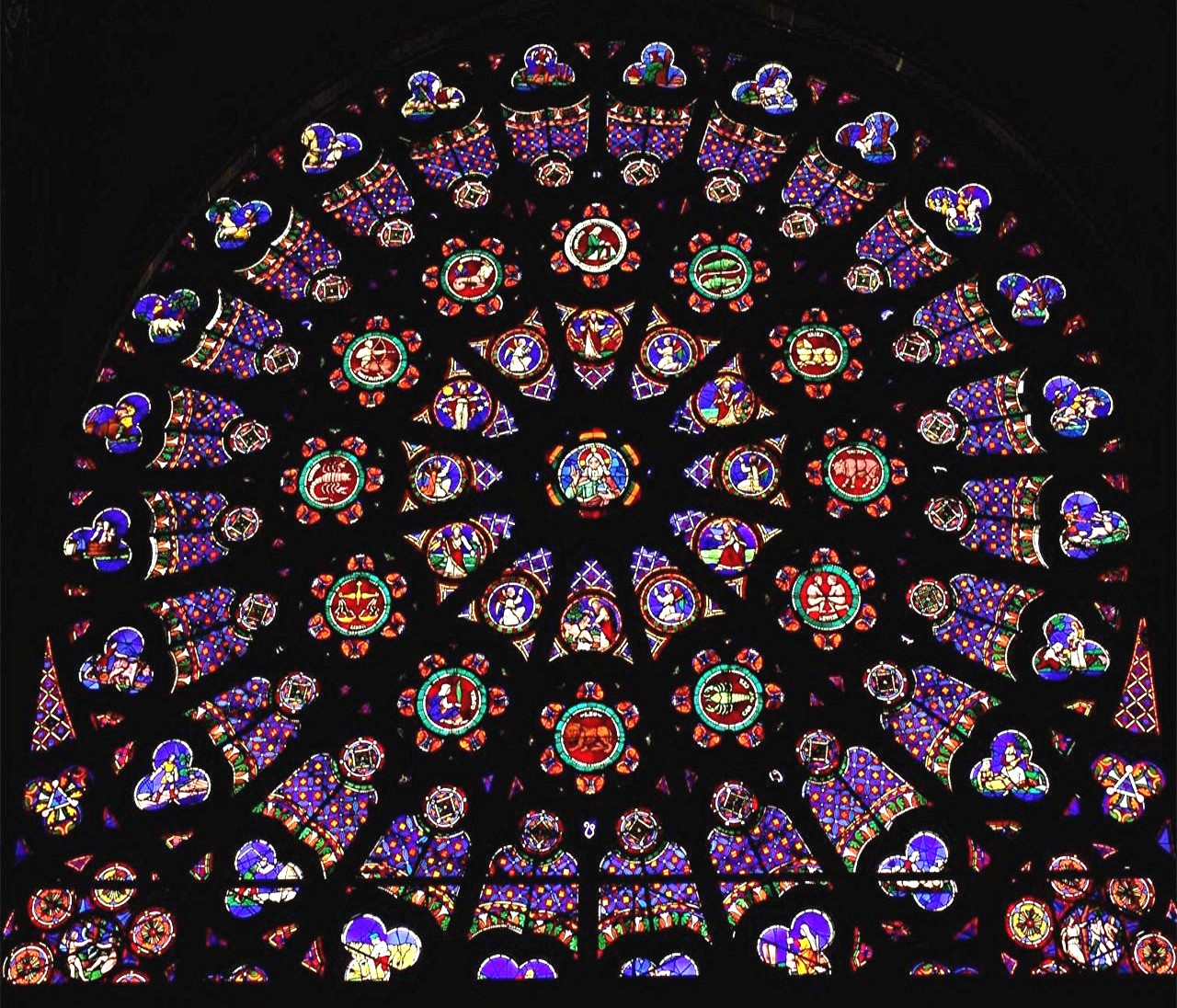
Cathedral of St. Denis, Paris

The vast amounts of wood needed to produce glass in this way dictated that glasshouses be located in forest areas and that the woodland be managed carefully by coppicing and pollarding to maximise the wood resource and to optimise the size of wood pieces used. Even so, periodically the glasshouse would have to relocate, as the woodland was depleted. The glass industry had to compete for wood supplies with other industries such as mining, and domestic demand. In 16th century England, an embargo was placed on the use of wood for fuel for glassmaking. Glasshouses often were located in forests owned by the church. One of the main uses of forest glass was for ecclesiastical stained glass windows.

== See also ==
- Heart of Stone (German fairy tale) - a glass works in the Black Forest is a key element of this German folk tale

== Bibliography ==
- Agricola, G. 1556, De Re Metallica, Book XII, Basel, (translated by H.C. and L.H. Hoover) Dover reprint 1950.
- Cable, M., 1998, The operation of wood-fired glass-melting furnaces. In: P. McCray and D. Kingery (eds.), The *Prehistory and History of Glassmaking Technology, 315–330.
- Crossley, D.,1998, The English glassmaker and his search for raw materials in the 16th and 17th centuries. In: P. *McCray and D. Kingery (eds.), The Prehistory and History of Glassmaking Technology, 167–179.
- Eramo, G., 2006, The glass-making crucibles of Derrière Sairoche (1699-1714 AD, Ct. Bern, Switzerland): a petrological approach. Journal of Archaeological Science 33, 440–452.
- Freestone, I., 1992, Theophilus and the composition of medieval glass. In: P. Vandiver er al. (eds.), Materials Issues in Art and Archaeology III, 739–745.
- Hammersley, G., 1973, The Charcoal Iron Industry and its Fuel. Economic History Review ser 2,26,593–613.
- Newton, R.G.,1978, Colouring agents used by medieval glass-makers. Glass Technology 19, 59–60.
- Pollard, A.M., and Heron, C., 1996, Archaeological Chemistry. Royal Society of Chemistry.
- Rehren, Th., 2000, Rationales in Old World base glass compositions. Journal of Archaeological Science 27, 1225–1234.
- Schalm, O., Calluwe, D., Wouters, H., Janssens, K., Verhaeghe, F., & Pieters, M., 2004, Chemical composition and deterioration of glass excavated in the 15-16th century fishermen town of Raversijde (Belgium), Spectrochimica Acta Part B 59, 1647-1656.
- Seibel, F., 2000, The Mandeville Miniature: Correct or Faulty?. In: Annales du 14e Congres de l'Association Internationale pour l'histoire du Verre, 2000, 208–209.
- Shortland, A., Schachner, L., Freestone, I. and Tite, M., 2006, Natron as a flux in the early vitreous materials industry: sources, beginnings and reasons for decline. Journal of Archaeological Science 33, 521–530.
- Smedley, J., Jackson, C.M., and Booth, C.A., 1998, Back to the roots: the raw materials, glass recipes and glassmaking practices of Theophilus. In: P. McCray and D. Kingery (eds.), The Prehistory and History of Glassmaking Technology, 145–165.
- Stern, W.B. and Gerber, Y., 2004. Potassium-Calcium Glass: New data and experiments. Archaeometry 46, 137–156.
- Tait, H., 1991. Five Thousand Years of Glass. British Museum Press, London.
- Theophilus, On Divers Arts. Edited and translated (1963) by J.G.Hawthorne and C.S.Smith (Dover Publications, New York)
- Wedepohl, K.H., 2000, The change in composition of medieval glass types occurring in excavated fragments from Germany. In: Annales du 14e Congres de l'Association Internationale pour l'histoire du Verre, 1998, 253–257.
- Wedepohl, K.H., 2005. The change in composition of medieval glass types occurring in excavated fragments from Germany. In: Annales du 16e Congres de l'Association Internationale pour l'histoire du Verre, 2003, 203–206.
