= W. W. Rouse Ball =

English mathematician and lawyer (1850–1925)

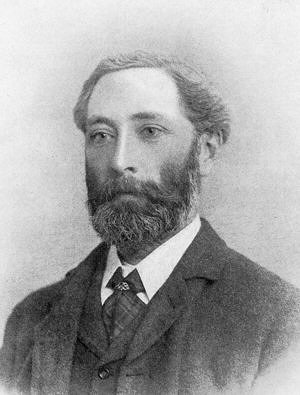
- Born: Walter William Rouse Ball; 14 August 1850; Hampstead, London, England
- Died: 4 April 1925 (aged 74); Cambridge, England
- Education: Trinity College, Cambridge
- Known for: Tessellations; magic squares; history of mathematics
- Awards: Smith's Prize (1874)
- Scientific career
- Fields: Mathematics
- Workplaces: Trinity College, Cambridge
- Doctoral students: Ernest Barnes

Walter William Rouse Ball (Note: Pronounced /ˈwɔːl.tər ˈwɪl.jəm raʊs bɔːl/; that is, Rouse rhymes with mouse, unlike the ordinary word rouse.) (14 August 1850 – 4 April 1925), known as W. W. Rouse Ball, was a British mathematician, lawyer, and fellow at Trinity College, Cambridge, from 1878 to 1905. He was also a keen amateur magician, and the founding president of the Cambridge Pentacle Club in 1919, one of the world's oldest magic societies.

== Life ==
Born 14 August 1850 in Hampstead, London, Ball was the son and heir of Walter Frederick Ball, of 3, St John's Park Villas, South Hampstead, London. Educated at University College School, he entered Trinity College, Cambridge, in 1870, became a scholar and first Smith's Prizeman, and gained his BA in 1874 as second Wrangler. He became a Fellow of Trinity in 1875, and remained one for the rest of his life.

He died on 4 April 1925 in Elmside, Cambridge, and is buried at the Parish of the Ascension Burial Ground in Cambridge.

He is commemorated in the naming of the small pavilion, now used as changing rooms and toilets, on Jesus Green in Cambridge.

== Books ==
- A History of the Study of Mathematics at Cambridge; Cambridge University Press, 1889 (reissued by the publisher, 2009, ISBN 978-1-108-00207-3)
- A Short Account of the History of Mathematics at Project Gutenberg (1st ed. 1888 and later editions). Dover 1960 republication of fourth edition: .
- Mathematical Recreations and Essays at Project Gutenberg (1st ed. 1892; later editions with H.S.M. Coxeter)
- A History of the First Trinity Boat Club (1908)
- Cambridge Papers at Project Gutenberg (1st ed. 1918). Macmillan and Co., Limited 1918: .
- String Figures; Cambridge, W. Heffer & Sons (1st ed. 1920, 2nd ed. 1921, 3rd ed. 1929, reprinted with supplements as Fun with String Figures by Dover Publications, 1971, ISBN 0-486-22809-6)

== See also ==
- Martin Gardner – another author of recreational mathematics
- Rouse Ball Professor of English Law
- Rouse Ball Professor of Mathematics
