= John G. Hawthorne =

English and American archaeologist and academic (1915–1977)

- Born: John Greenfield Hawthorne; 6 June 1915; Newcastle, England
- Died: 8 March 1977 (aged 61)
- Spouse: Dolores Bandini
- Children: 2
- Relatives: Sir William Hawthorne (brother)

Academic background
- Education: University of Cambridge (B.A., 1937; M.A., 1946); Harvard University (M.A. classics, 1939); University of Chicago (Ph.D., 1949)

Academic work
- Discipline: Classicist; archaeologist
- Institutions: University of Chicago

John Greenfield Hawthorne (6 June 1915 – 8 March 1977) was an English and American archaeologist and academic. He was known for his works on Greek literature, and translations, and in 1963 published, with Cyril Stanley Smith, a translation of the works on metallurgy by Theophilus.

== Early life and education ==
John Greenfield Hawthorne was born in Newcastle, England, on 6 June 1915. He had two brothers, Edward and William. Educated at Rugby School, in 1937 he graduated with an honours degree in classics from Corpus Christi College at the University of Cambridge. Two years later, he received a master's degree from Harvard University.

From 1941 to 1946, during World War II, Hawthorne served in many diplomatic posts, including commercial attaché in the British Embassy in Belgium, and as a member of the British Economic Mission to the United States. By January 1946, when he gave a speech on "The Greeks and the Sea" at Vassar College in New York, he was serving as secretary and treasurer-elect to the American Branch of the Consolidated Gold Fields of South Africa.

In 1946, Hawthorne was awarded another master's, this one by Cambridge. In 1949, while a professor at the University of Chicago, Hawthorne obtained a Ph.D. there, with guidance from Gertrude Smith and Benedict Einarson. At the time, Chicago was one of the very few schools to offer a doctorate in classics. Hawthorne's dissertation, Gorgias of Leontini: A Critical Appraisal with Translation and Commentary of the Extant Fragments, offered what he described as the first complete English translation of the fragmentary writings of Gorgias of Leontini.

== Career ==
Hawthorne was named an assistant professor at the University of Chicago in 1946. In 1952 he was made an associate professor of classics, in 1953 he spent time teaching at Vassar, and from 1957 to 1960 he chaired the department at Chicago. From 1956 to 1963, he was also the president of the Chicago Society of the Archaeological Institute of America. In 1957 he was awarded a Fulbright scholarship to undertake research at the American School of Classical Studies in Athens, Greece, where he also conducted excavations. He lectured on the subject of archaeology, including as a visitor to places like the Universities of Iowa and Minnesota.

In 1963 Hawthorne, together with Cyril Stanley Smith, published a translation of the works on metallurgy by Theophilus. The book took a technical approach, and followed a 1961 translation by Charles Reginald Dodwell that took a philological approach. The historian Lynn Townsend White Jr. wrote that "[h]enceforth anyone dealing with Theophilus must read both these books simultaneously, one in each hand. While Smith and Hawthorne built on Dodwell, the latter, save in specific instances, remains authoritative for the Latin text ... Smith, on the other hand, being one of the world's eminent metallurgists, approaches the text less in terms of philology than as one who shares Theophilus's own technical concerns."

Following a student sit-in in 1969, Hawthorne called the Chicago Tribune to laud the university's "pioneering" approach. "The sit-in at Chicago is now over," he said, "without bloodshed, beatings, or other violent acts ... Where other colleges here and abroad have called in the police, the national guard, the military, this university, dedicated as it is to the solution of problems by intellectual, reasoning, and patient 'confrontation' of human minds has arrived at a decent, fair, and honorable solution of this crisis."

== Personal life ==
On 7 July 1948, Hawthorne married Dolores Bandini, a Stanford-educated physicist. She was the daughter of Mildred (born Mildred Draper Shlaudeman) and Elliott Bandini, himself a Stanford-educated engineer, and descended from a pioneering California family; she was the great-granddaughter of Juan Bandini. Dolores Bandini was a post-doctoral research fellow of Edward Teller and had been invited by J. Robert Oppenheimer to work at Los Alamos National Laboratory while the Manhattan Project was underway, but left academia after giving birth. The wedding took place in Florence, Italy, where Bandini's mother (by then Mildred Shlaudeman Park) lived. Hawthorne and Bandini had two children, John Elliott and Margaret Deirdre "Nini" Hawthorne.

Hawthorne became a United States citizen in 1952. He died on 8 March 1977 at the age of 61, following a six-month stay at Billings Hospital. His son, a Duke University forestry graduate, died the following year in a climbing accident in Oregon.

The John G. Hawthorne Travel Prize (formerly the John G. Hawthorne Travel Prize in Classical Studies) at the University of Chicago is named after Hawthorne. It is awarded to "an outstanding undergraduate student of classical languages, literature, or civilization for travel to Greece or Italy or for study of classical materials in other countries".

== Publications ==
Among Hawthorne's publications were many on ancient Greek literature and translations. He also edited two documentaries about Greek archaeological excavations.

=== Books ===
- Hawthorne, John G. (8 June 1949). Gorgias of Leontini: A Critical Appraisal with Translation and Commentary of the Extant Fragments (Ph.D.). University of Chicago. ProQuest 301854564.
- Hawthorne, John G. & Smith, Cyril Stanley (1979). Theophilus: On Divers Arts (2nd ed.). New York: Dover. ISBN 0-486-23784-2.

=== Articles ===
- Hawthorne, John G. (November 1951). "The Delight of Latin". The Classical Journal. 47 (2). Classical Association of the Middle West and South: 75–77, 98. JSTOR 3293541.
- Hawthorne, John G. (1958). "The Myth of Palaemon". Transactions of the American Philosophical Society. LXXXIX. American Philosophical Society: 92–98. doi:10.2307/283668. JSTOR 283668.
- Hawthorne, John G. (April 1959). "The Agamemnon of Aeschylus: A Lecture in a General Education Course in the Humanities". The Journal of General Education. XII (2): 104–112. JSTOR 27795630.
- Hawthorne, John G. (September 1965). "Cenchreae: Port of Corinth". Archaeology. 18 (3). New York: Archaeological Institute of America: 191–200. JSTOR 41667534.
- Smith, Cyril Stanley & Hawthorne, John G. (1974). "Mappae Clavicula: A Little Key to the World of Medieval Techniques". Transactions of the American Philosophical Society. 64 (4). American Philosophical Society: 1–128. doi:10.2307/1006317. JSTOR 1006317.

=== Reviews ===
- Hawthorne, John G. (July 1952). "Review of Einführung in die griechische Metrik, by Karl Rupprecht". Classical Philology. XLVII (3). Chicago: The University of Chicago Press: 204–205. doi:10.1086/363535. JSTOR 266037.
- Hawthorne, John G. (January 1954). "Review of Greek Literature for the Modern Reader, by Harold Baldry". Classical Philology. XLIX (1). Chicago: The University of Chicago Press: 45–47. doi:10.1086/363729. JSTOR 265563.
- Hawthorne, John G. (April 1954). "Review of Euripide et la Guerre du Péloponnèse, by Édouard Delebecque". Classical Philology. XLIX (2). Chicago: The University of Chicago Press: 144–146. doi:10.1086/363784. JSTOR 267441.
- Hawthorne, John G. (January 1955). "Review of Plato's Phaedrus, translated by Reginald Hackforth". Classical Philology. L (1). Chicago: The University of Chicago Press: 75–76. doi:10.1086/363879. JSTOR 266140.
- Hawthorne, John G. (January 1963). "Review of Heraclitus, by Philip Wheelwright". The Journal of Religion. XLIII (1). Chicago: The University of Chicago Press: 63–65. doi:10.1086/485512. JSTOR 1200170.

=== Other ===
- Hawthorne, John G. (12 October 1946). "Chicago: A Sonnet". Chicago Daily Tribune. Vol. CV, no. 245. Chicago, Illinois. p. 14 – via Newspapers.com.

== Bibliography ==
- Agoston, George A. (Summer 1977). "Review of Mappae Clavicula: A Little Key to the World of Medieval Techniques". Leonardo. 10 (3). Oxford: Pergamon Press: 256. doi:10.2307/1573473. JSTOR 1573473. S2CID 194426364.
- Dresbeck, LeRoy Dresbeck (April 1975). "Review of Mappae Clavicula: A Little Key to the World of Medieval Techniques". Technology and Culture. 16 (2). Chicago: The University of Chicago Press: 287–289. doi:10.2307/3103495. JSTOR 3103495. S2CID 112111192.
- Hall, Bert S. (March 1976). "Review of Mappae Clavicula: A Little Key to the World of Medieval Techniques". Isis. 67 (236). Washington, D.C.: The Smithsonian Institution: 123–124. doi:10.1086/351562. JSTOR 231151.
- Kauffmann, C. M. (May 1964). "Review of Theophilus: On Divers Arts". The Burlington Magazine. CVI (734). London: 239–240. JSTOR 874219.
- Morrison, Philip (March 1980). "Review of Theophilus: On Divers Arts, and of Mappae Clavicula: A Little Key to the World of Medieval Techniques". Scientific American. 242 (3). New York: Scientific American, Inc.: 41–44. doi:10.1038/scientificamerican0380-41. JSTOR 24966273.
- White, Lynn Townsend Jr. (Spring 1964). "Theophilus Redivivus". Technology and Culture. V (2). The Johns Hopkins University Press: 224–233. doi:10.2307/3101163. JSTOR 3101163. S2CID 260096342.
  - Republished as White, Lynn Townsend Jr. (1978). "Theophilus Redivivus". Medieval Religion and Technology: Collected Essays. Berkeley: University of California Press. pp. 93–103. ISBN 0-520-03566-6.
