= Hopkinson and Imperial Chemical Industries Professor of Applied Thermodynamics =

The Hopkinson and Imperial Chemical Industries Professorship of Applied Thermodynamics at the University of Cambridge was established on 10 February 1950, largely from the endowment fund of the proposed Hopkinson Professorship in Thermodynamics and a gift from ICI Limited of £50,000, less tax, spread over the seven years from 1949 to 1955. The professorship is assigned primarily to the Faculty of Engineering.

The chair is named in honour of John Hopkinson, whose widow originally endowed a lectureship in thermodynamics in the hope that it would eventually be upgraded to a professorship.

== List of Hopkinson and Imperial Chemical Industries Professors of Applied Thermodynamics ==
- 1951 - 1980 Sir William Rede Hawthorne
- 1980 - 1983 John Arthur Shercliff
- 1985 - 1997 Kenneth Noel Corbett Bray
- 1998 - 2015 John Bernard Young
- 2015–present Epaminondas Mastorakos
