= Pentacle Club =

Magic club

The Pentacle Club is one of the world's oldest magic societies, known by amateur and professional magicians for its longevity and members.

== Origins ==
The Pentacle Club was founded in 1919 by Professor W. W. Rouse Ball, J. H. Johnson, C. R. Cosens, F. J. W. Roughton, and W. I. Grantham. The Club, consisting of members of the University of Cambridge, was a successor to The Mystics, a pre-World War I club that ran from 1909 to 1914. Rouse Ball, the first President of the club, gathered support from across the university for the first meeting of the club, where the members "saw demonstrations of rope and card tricks, thimble and billiard ball manipulations". The initial subscription rate was half a crown a term.

== Later history ==
During the 1920s, the Pentacle Club became increasingly well known on a national level, thanks in part to a sequence of guest visits to Cambridge, including Douglas Dexter and Nevil Maskelyne, the latter inviting the Pentacle Club to undertake a joint performance with the Magic Circle in London. During the Second World War, the club performed in aid of the Red Cross, with amateur magicians from the University of London, evacuated to Cambridge during the conflict, adding to the membership. In 1963, the club began to admit members from outside the university, leading to a slow change in the club's composition — over the last few decades, the membership has been increasingly drawn from the Cambridge region, and less from undergraduates. The club retained its traditional links to the university, however, under the long presidency of Sir William Hawthorne, Master of Churchill College, Cambridge, well known for performing magic.

In 2023, students at the University of Cambridge revived the original name and emblem for The Mystics, reimagined as a society for the academic study and discussion of supernatural magic and esotericism.

== Present ==
President Jeremy Bond MMC	Secretary Hugh Newsam MMC	Treasurer Chris Kostecki MMC

Committee Member Raymond Christofides MMC	Committee Member Simon Gathercole	Committee Member Brent Swann-Auger MMC

== Past presidents ==
Presidents and their tenures:

- 1919–1925 Professor W. W. Rouse Ball
- 1925–1932 Doctor J. Canney
- 1932–1968 Doctor F.B. Kipping
- 1969–1969 Sir Gordon Sutherland
- 1970–1990 Sir William Hawthorne
- 1990–2008 Claude Perry MIMC
- 2008–2013 John Davenport MIMC
- 2013–2018 Chris Kostecki MMC

Current president (2018 – present): Jeremy "JezO" Bond MMC
