= William Hawthorne =

British professor of engineering

Sir William Hawthorne CBE FRS FREng FIMechE FRAES

2nd Master of Churchill College, Cambridge
- In office 1968–1983
- Preceded by: Sir John Cockcroft
- Succeeded by: Sir Hermann Bondi

Personal details
- Born: 2 May 1913 Newcastle-upon-Tyne, England, UK
- Died: 16 September 2011 (aged 98)
- Education: Trinity College, Cambridge (BA); Massachusetts Institute of Technology (ScD)

Sir William Rede Hawthorne (22 May 1913 – 16 September 2011) was an English professor of engineering who worked on the development of the jet engine. Bragg-Hawthorne equation is named after him.

== Life ==
Hawthorne was born in Newcastle-upon-Tyne, England, the son of a civil engineer from Belfast. He had two younger brothers, John and Edward. He was educated at Westminster School, London, then read mathematics and engineering at Trinity College, Cambridge, graduating in 1934 with a double first-class degree. He spent two years as a graduate apprentice with Babcock & Wilcox Ltd, then went to the Massachusetts Institute of Technology (MIT) in Cambridge, Massachusetts, where his research on laminar and turbulent flames earned him a Doctor of Science (ScD) degree two years later. In 1939, he married Barbara Runkle (d. 1992, granddaughter of MIT's second President John Daniel Runkle), and they had one son and two daughters.

After MIT, he returned to Babcock & Wilcox. In 1940, he joined the Royal Aircraft Establishment at Farnborough. He was seconded from there to Power Jets Ltd at Lutterworth, where he worked with Frank Whittle on combustion chamber development for the jet engine. Building on his work on the mixing of fuel and air in flames at MIT, he derived the mixture for fast combustion; the chambers produced by his team were used in the first British jet aircraft.

In 1941, he returned to Farnborough as head of the newly formed Gas Turbine Division and in 1944 he was sent for a time to Washington to work with the British Air Commission. In 1945, he became deputy director of Engine Research in the British Ministry of Supply before returning to America a year later as an associate professor of engineering at MIT. He was appointed George Westinghouse Professor of Mechanical Engineering there at the age of 35, and in 1951 returned to Cambridge, UK as the first Hopkinson and Imperial Chemical Industries Professor of Applied Thermodynamics (1951–1980). Hawthorne's most outstanding work at Cambridge was in the understanding of loss mechanisms in turbomachinery, and during his time as Head of department he and Professor John Horlock (later Vice-Chancellor of The Open University) established the Turbomachinery Laboratory.

The oil shortage following the Suez Crisis and Hawthorne's interest in energy matters led to his invention and development of Dracone flexible barges for transporting oil, fresh water, or other liquids. (The name "Dracone" is allegedly a reference to Frank Herbert's The Dragon in the Sea science fiction novel, which featured this kind of tanker.) Hawthorne was active on many committees and advisory bodies concerned with energy matters, in particular the Advisory Council on Energy Conservation, of which he was chairman from its inception in 1974.

In 1981, he received an honorary doctorate from the University of Bath.

Hawthorne was elected to the fellowship of the Royal Society in 1955, and was knighted in 1970. He became Head of the Department of Engineering in Cambridge in 1968 and was appointed Master of Churchill College, Cambridge in the same year, serving until 1983.

President of the Pentacle Club from 1970 to 1990, Hawthorne was well known for performing magic, and is remembered to this day by the kitchen staff at Churchill College as "the man who made cheese rolls come out from behind his ears".

== Notes ==
Academic offices
Preceded by New position	Hopkinson and Imperial Chemical Industries; Professor of Applied Thermodynamics, Cambridge University; 1951–1980	Succeeded by John Arthur Shercliff
Preceded by Sir John Cockcroft	Master of Churchill College, Cambridge; 1968–1983	Succeeded by Sir Hermann Bondi
