= Benedict Einarson =

American classicist (1906–1978)

- Born: Benedict Seneca Einarson; April 29, 1906; Chicago, Illinois, United States
- Died: August 12, 1978 (aged 72); Chicago, Illinois, United States

Academic background
- Education: University of Chicago (AB, AM, PhD)
- Thesis: Studies in Nemesius (1932)
- Doctoral advisor: Paul Shorey

Benedict Seneca Einarson (April 29, 1906 – August 12, 1978) was the Edward Olson Professor of Greek at the University of Chicago.

== Biography ==
Einarson was born in 1901 to Benedict Einarson, an Icelandic doctor, and a Swedish mother. Graduating from Parker High School, he was admitted to the University of Chicago as an "entrance scholar", receiving a "half-scholarship" for his examination placements. He received a bachelor's degree with honors in 1926, and further obtained a master's degree in Greek in 1927. He then undertook his doctoral studies under Paul Shorey, receiving a doctorate in 1932 after defending his thesis, Studies in Nemesius.

With the assistance of Paul Shorey, Einarson obtained a fellowship at Yale in 1933. He then became a member of the Harvard Society of Fellows, serving as one of its junior fellows between 1934 and 1937 before becoming an instructor at Harvard. Suffering from a nervous breakdown in 1939, he left Harvard and applied for an open position for teaching Greek at the University of Chicago. There, he first taught as an instructor from 1940 to 1942, then as an assistant professor between 1942 and 1946 and as an associate professor from 1946 to 1952; he also served as an assistant editor of Classical Philology. Einarson briefly taught as a Fulbright lecturer at the University of Oxford in 1959 and 1960; in 1966, he was appointed as Edward Olson Professor of Greek at the university.

Einarson died of lung cancer on August 12, 1978, in Chicago, and was eulogized in Gnomon as "the United States' most learned Hellenist".
