= James Franck Institute =

UChicago interdisciplinary physics research institute

- Established: 1945
- Field of research: physics, chemistry and materials science
- Director: Margaret Gardel
- Location: Chicago, Illinois
- Affiliations: University of Chicago
- Website: jfi.uchicago.edu

The James Franck Institute of the University of Chicago conducts interdisciplinary research in physics, chemistry and materials science. Scientists at the institute include those interested in condensed matter physics, physical chemistry, materials chemistry, atomic, molecular, and optical physics, geophysics, and biophysics.

Founded in 1945 by university President Robert Maynard Hutchins as the Institute for the Study of Metals, it was renamed for Nobel Prize winning physicist James Franck in 1967. It had its beginnings in the Metallurgical Laboratory, the World War II project that initiated the first self-sustaining nuclear chain reaction, using the metal uranium. The Institute's founding director was Cyril Stanley Smith, former head of metallurgy at Los Alamos and the institute made early advances in pseudopotential theory and study of the Fermi surface. The Institute was an early pioneer in interdisciplinary research in wide-ranging subjects: as it was organized like a "benevolent anarchy", a large percent of its early papers did not even deal with metals but other aspects of chemistry and physics.

== See also ==
- Enrico Fermi Institute
