= Conservation and restoration of stained glass =

Figure 1 – Tourists visiting La Sainte-Chapelle in Paris, France

Stained glass conservation refers to the protection and preservation of historic stained glass for present and future generations. It involves any and all actions devoted to the prevention, mitigation, or reversal of the processes of deterioration that affect such glassworks and subsequently inhibit individuals' ability to access and appreciate them, as part of the world's collective cultural heritage. It functions as a part of the larger practices of cultural heritage conservation (conservation-restoration) and architectural conservation.

Stained glass is lauded as one of the most beautiful and compelling forms of architectural decoration; however, it is also one of the most vulnerable (Brown et al. 2002, xi). The fabric of the glass itself, the paint or stain used to decorate it, and even the metal framework used to hold the design together are all at risk of deterioration, and will likely require conservation work to ensure their long-term survival. Historic glazing is subject to damage caused by continued exposure to pollution and the elements, on top of that resulting from inherent problems, such as the innate fragility of glass and any potential chemical instability of the materials involved (Brown et al. 2002, xi; Rauch 2004). Deterioration does not always occur gradually and may also occur suddenly and catastrophically, as the result of natural disasters (e.g. fire, extreme weather), accidents (e.g. improper handling, removal or treatment), or malicious damage (e.g. vandalism) (Brown et al. 2002, xi; Vogel et al. 2007).

Owing to the delicate nature of the materials, and the incalculable historic and aesthetic value of stained glass work, any and all treatments should be planned and performed by professional conservators and craftspeople, who have been specially trained in the peculiarities of the medium. While preservation is the shared responsibility of all involved, including visitors, caretakers, and other stakeholders, it is imperative that professionals are consulted to ensure the continued integrity of the physical materials and their associated significance. For this reason, all projects should begin with a conservation plan that incorporates research in such topics as the history of the windows or building, the materials involved, and past alterations, as a key element of all conservation decisions. The type of conservation treatment employed should reflect this research, as well as the needs of the building as a whole, and should always be documented for reference in the future (CVMA 2004).

For information on the creation, construction, and history of stained glass windows see Stained glass.

== Deterioration of stained glass ==
The primary aim of conservation is to slow the rate of deterioration, caused by various factors, to the point where the loss of significance, such as historic information and/or aesthetic value can be kept to a minimum (Pye 2001, Ch. 5). However, in the case of stained glass, these efforts are complicated by the nature of the medium itself. This is because a stained-glass window is a 'complex object' in that it is made from more than one component material, each with its own inherent risks and conservation needs (Pye 2001, 80). In addition to the most obvious component, glass, all windows will typically involve some sort paint or stain as decoration, metal strips, or 'cames' used to join the pieces of glass together, waterproofing materials, and fixing systems or frameworks used for additional support (Brown et al. 2002; Vogel et al. 2007). The condition of each component is important for the overall preservation of the window, as deterioration within one material can affect the others with varying degrees of severity.

=== Causes ===
The vast majority of stained glass was originally created to function as part of the building envelope, separating the interior of the structure from exterior environmental conditions. As a result, most historic glazing that has been left in situ is subjected to a constant onslaught of harmful conditions including (but not limited to): UV light from sunlight, extreme weather conditions, indoor and outdoor man-made pollution, and biological damage caused by pests such as pigeons, bats, and various micro-organisms (Rauch 2004, 3). As a result, panels often become encrusted with thick layers of dirt that eventually become quite firmly affixed, and can even begin to intermingle with the underlying, corroded layers of paint (Rauch 2004, 3). Environmental influences also play a role in the continuing deterioration of metal cames and frameworks, which can cause significant structural damage. In addition to these environmental stressors, further deterioration can also result from the myriad of other factors that influence the materials out of which the window is constructed, such as vibration from building use and the remains of previous treatments and repairs that have since deteriorated and increased the corrosion processes of other materials (Rauch 2004, 3).

=== Deterioration of the glass ===
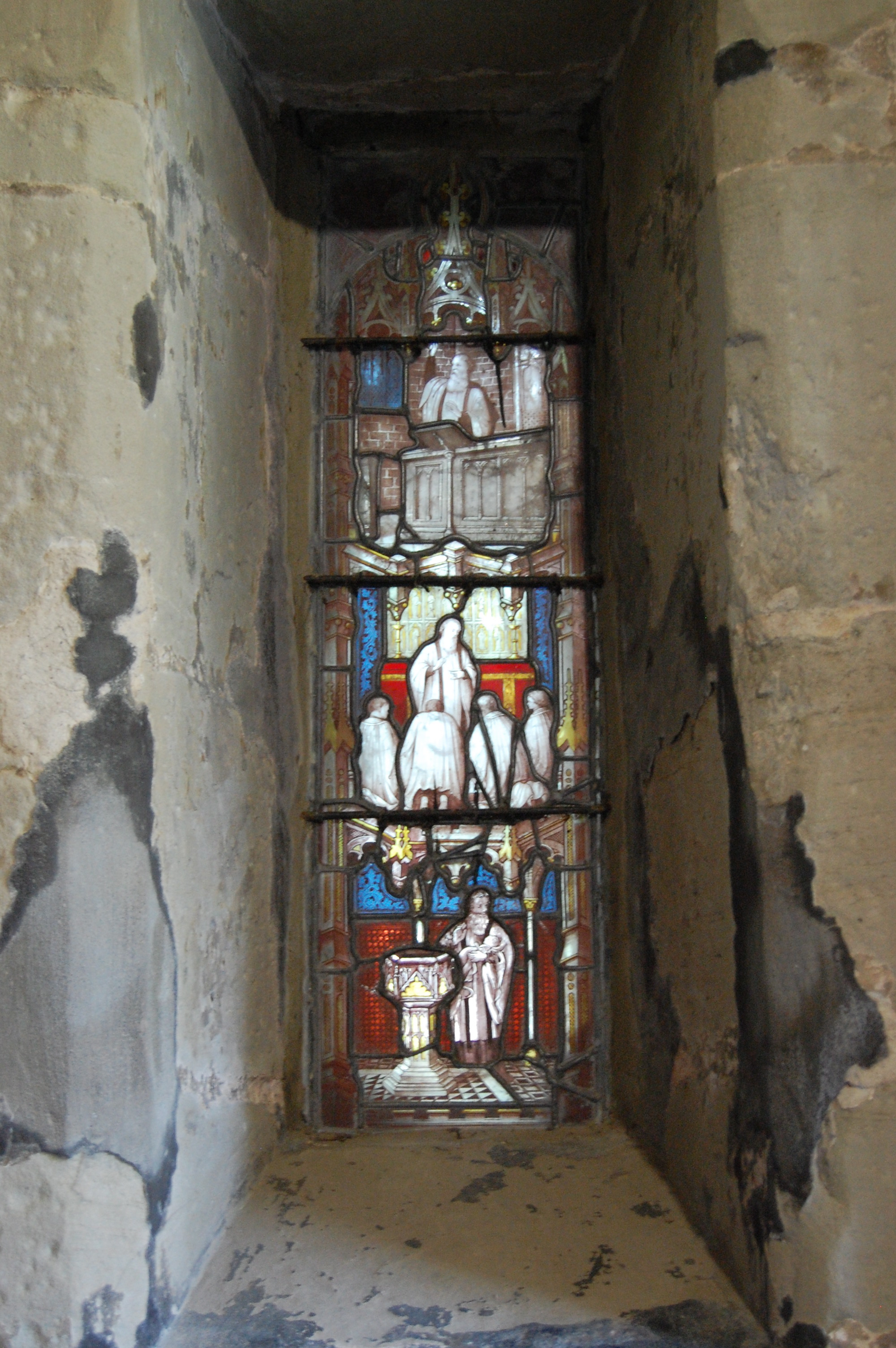
Figure 2 – Faded faces on a panel form Holy Trinity Church in Stratford-upon-Avon, UK.

Although glass as a material is known for its chemical stability resistance to natural deterioration, impurities, and variations in glass composition can cause considerable chemical instability that may further destructive processes (Vogel et al. 2007, 7). Glass is also susceptible to atmospheric pollution, and high levels of humidity or moisture over long periods of time, both of which can speed up the corrosion rate of chemically unstable glass. Over time, corrosion, marked by pitting or pocking of the glass, can deepen and spread until the surface layer itself breaks apart, uncovering the vulnerable, damaged core, until it becomes opaque (Rauch 2004, 3). This opacification occurs as water seeps through the subsequent cracks, causing the formation of opaque syngenite and gypsum crystals that block light from filtering through the previously translucent glass (Rauch 2004, 3). As these crystals continue to grow, they pose an even greater danger to the glass, eventually breaking through the surface and dislodging the delicate paint layer, or even causing cracks (Rauch 2004, 4). Glass plates can also darken or cloud as the result of the oxidation of certain metals, such as manganese, which was a common addition to late medieval glass (Rauch 2004, 4).

=== Breakdown of paints, enamels, stains ===
As previously mentioned, the paint/stain layer may suffer as the result of deterioration within the fabric of the glass itself; however, this fragile layer is at risk for other types of damage as well. Painted surfaces that would have been applied to glass cold and fired on, are especially vulnerable to damage from condensation or weathering if they were fired improperly during the production process (Vogel 2007, 7). This is often the case with the fading or disappearance of fine detail, such as faces, in figural stained glass art (fig. 2). Over time, enamels can begin to flake off of glass panels, and certain types or colours of stains can discolour with continued UV exposure, all of which significantly alters the aesthetic impact of the work as a whole (Brown et al. 2002, 18–19; Vogel et al. 2007, 7).

=== Structural deformation and deterioration ===
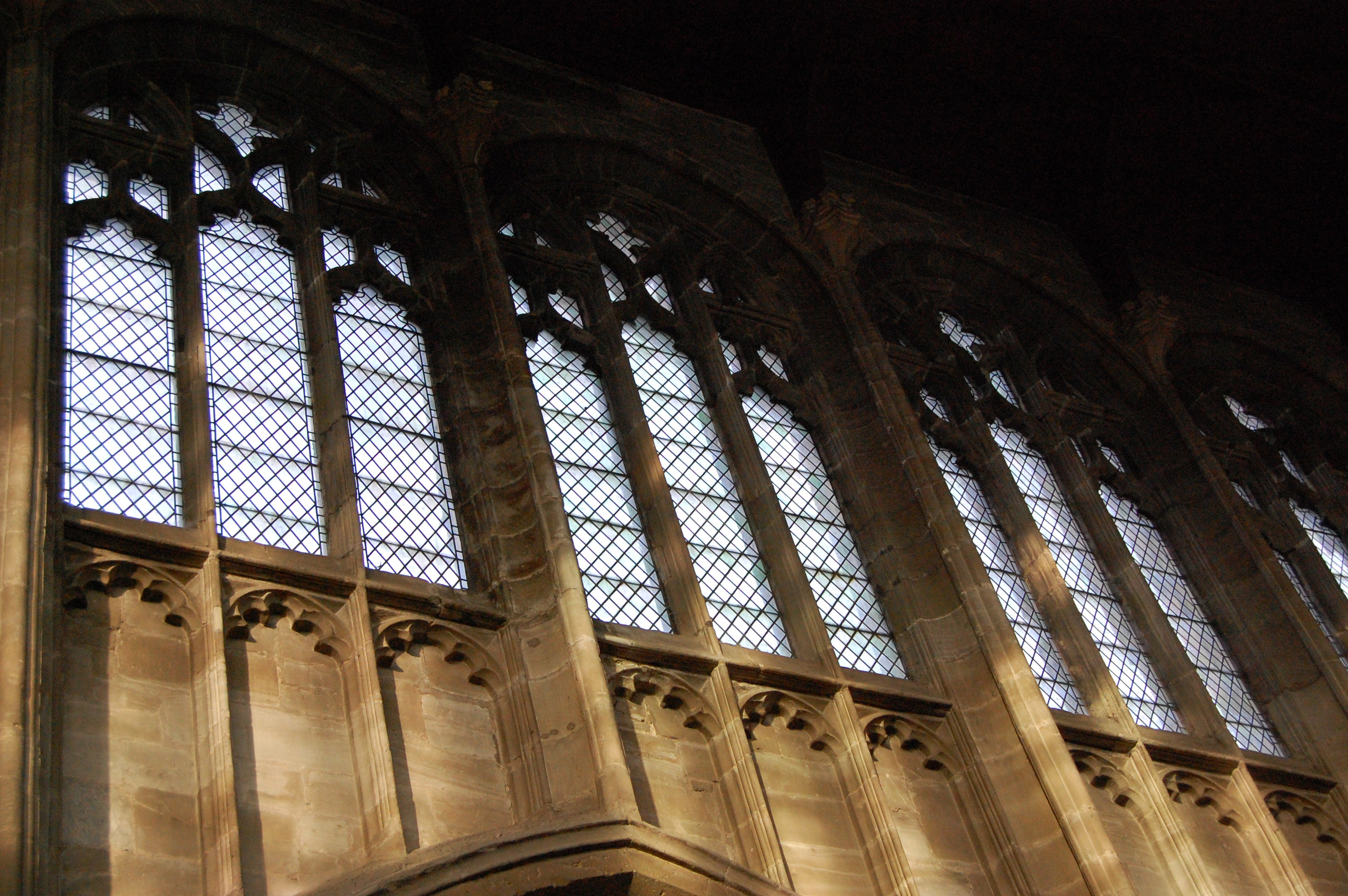
Figure 3 – The leaded clerestory windows of Holy Trinity Church have been weakened by time and the elements.

The breakdown of the skeletal structure that holds the glass in place, such as damage to tracery and the corrosion of metal cames and fixing systems, often poses the greatest, imminent risk to stained glass work (Vogel et al. 2007, 7). Although stone elements are not prone to excessive change due to environmental conditions, this is not the case with metals, which are much more likely to deteriorate from prolonged exposure to the elements. For example, the cames that make up the matrix of a stained-glass window, for which lead and zinc were most commonly used, undergo quite a bit of thermal expansion and contraction, eventually resulting in metal fatigue, which in turn weakens the joints between the plates, causing whole panels to deform or simply fall apart (Vogel et al. 2007, 8). Additionally, metal matrixes and frames may weaken with stress, such as that which has occurred at Holy Trinity Church in Stratford-upon-Avon, UK, where years of wind buffeting the leaded clerestory windows has endangered the structural integrity of not only the glazing but also, the upper portion of building itself (fig. 3) (Friends of Shakespeare's Church 2009).

== Creating a conservation plan ==
In many ways, proper conservation is as much about research and documentation as it is about 'hands-on' conservation treatments and restoration (Sloan 1993, 27). The conservator must be familiar with not only the general materials with which he or she is working but also the details specific to the project at hand, in order to understand and address the needs of a particular window or building. Using this knowledge, conservators can develop a conservation plan that can be used throughout the project, to ensure that all decisions are made with the aims of the project and the needs of the object in mind (CVMA 2004).

=== Basic conservation philosophy ===
In J. Sloan's discussion of stained glass conservation in the United States, the author gives the following list of ethical and philosophical criteria to be applied to the conservation of stained glass (Sloan 1993, 13):

1. All materials and procedures should be reversible without affecting the piece.
2. All intervention must be the least required to achieve the desired end.
3. Original materials should be retained so far as is possible.
4. All conditions, procedures, materials, and processes must be recorded.
5. The hand or style of the conservator should not be visible to the casual observer on the object. However, all restoration should be discernable to future conservators.
6. The conservator is ethically bound to provide the highest quality restoration within his [or her] power without regard for his [or her] personal opinion of the value ... of the object.

While this list is not exhaustive, it does illustrate the basic foundations upon which responsible conservation decisions should be made. Of utmost importance in this list are the fundamental ideas of minimal intervention and reversibility of treatment, both of which are necessary to ensure that the overall integrity of the windows, as historic and artistically valuable objects, is not compromised.

=== Research ===
Owing to the incredible amount of chemical and methodological variability to be found when dealing with stained glass, research into the general production habits of pertinent regions or eras may provide clues that can help conservators understand the overall significance of the piece, anticipate what to expect from the materials, and determine how to proceed (Sloan 1993, 28; Vogel 2007, 5). For example, a conservator working on a set of windows in the United States, will want to ascertain whether the glass was produced before, during, or after the mid-19th century, as changes to general glass composition were made during this time that could influence the types of impurities—and subsequently, some of the deterioration—to be expected (Vogel et al. 2007, 7). This research phase should also include a full condition report on the current condition of the stained glass that includes a record of any and all evidence of past intervention or repair (CVMA 2004).

=== Decision making and implementation ===
Decisions should be made using the information gathered during research, and implemented by experienced conservators. Caretakers and project managers should be responsible for screening conservators/studios effectively, while the conservators themselves are responsible for advocating on behalf of the stained glass during any negotiations. As much as possible, the benefit to the historic glazing should come before all other considerations (Vogel et al. 2007, 1). At all stages, steps should be taken to ensure that the actions taken are in keeping with the aims of the conservation plan.

=== Documentation ===
Proper documentation plays an extremely important role throughout this entire process and should be considered obligatory. All aspects of this process including preliminary research, condition surveys, conservation plans, and all the methods and materials used throughout treatment should be duly recorded, and the documents are preserved and made accessible in the long-term for future reference (CVMA 2004).

== Types of treatments ==
In general, it is best to keep interventive treatments at a minimum: minor signs of age are an integral part of the character of the structure and its history (Pye 2001, 96; Vogel et al. 2007, 9). However, more serious damage that either detracts from the aesthetic or practical functions of the glass, or indicates active deterioration may require more extensive treatment.

Figure 4 – The linear shadow from a protective grill on a panel at Notre Dame Cathedral in Paris, France

=== Cleaning ===
Careful cleaning of stained glass can be a very effective means of improving its overall condition because its appearance and function are so heavily dependent on its ability to transmit light. Unfortunately, owing to the fragility of corroded glass, nearly all cleaning treatments can cause changes in the surface of the glass that can expedite corrosion rates, or damage delicate paint layers (Romich et al. 2000). Thus, cleaning efforts should not necessarily be concerned with the complete removal of all encrustations, but rather the careful thinning of these layers to a point where light can be transmitted through the glass at an acceptable level (Rauch 2004, 5). The simplest cleaning can be performed using carefully applied deionised water, although other mechanical or chemical means are often necessary, and must always be done slowly, in a controlled and focused manner (Rauch 2004, 5–6; Vogel et al. 2007, 9–10). Scalpels or a micro-jet process* can be used to gradually, mechanically thin out these encrustations layer by layer, in the lab. Conversely, poultices or gel pads steeped in a non-ionic detergent or EDTA can be applied to the surface of the glass for long periods of time for "deep, focused cleaning" (Rauch 2004, 6). With any of these methods, care must be taken to ensure the stability of painted layers, before treatment can take place. If these layers appear particularly friable, then it is necessary to clean the glass delicately with cotton swabs, and in more extreme cases, manually affix the original paint lines to the surface, under a microscope, by applying small drops of resin at specific points (Rauch 2004, 6; Vogel et al. 2007, 10). Care should be taken not to remove any later over-painting without due consideration, as such layers may have historic value, in their own right (Rauch 2004, 7).

=== Repairs and replacements ===
Within conservation, repairs are meant to last, but should also be as reversible as possible, in keeping with the general ethical guidelines of modern conservation practice (Sloane 1993, 13). In the context of stained glass, repairs can involve treatment of the glass itself, treatment of missing areas, or structural consolidation of the matrix or surrounding architectural fabric.

Broken glass is typically repaired in one of three ways: copper foiling (thin copper tape that is applied to both sides of the break and then soldered); epoxy edge-gluing; and silicone edge-gluing. Each of these has its own inherent benefits and problems. For instance, copper foiling produces a strong, reversible, attractive repair, but is unsuitable for use with unstable glass because of the heat involved in the application process. Epoxy edge-gluing, on the other hand, is strong and nearly invisible, but deteriorates in direct sunlight, while silicone edge-gluing dries clear and is easily reversible, but unfortunately refracts light differently from glass, making such repairs more readily apparent (Vogel et al. 2007, 12).

Missing areas can be filled or replaced but should be done so with caution. All additions must be marked as such, and documented. Ultimately, "it is nearly always better to use an imperfect original piece of glass than to replace it" (Vogel et al. 2007, 12). A modern replacement of the glass with "exact" replicas is virtually impossible, and goes against conservation philosophy by potentially clouding viewers' perception of the original. Instead, it is preferable to use similarly coloured, but clearly differentiated glass in order to preserve the aesthetic effect of the stained glass without sacrificing the integrity of the original (Rauch 2004, 7; Vogel et al. 2007, 11).

Structurally speaking it is most important to keep the frame intact and in good condition, to ensure the overall safety of the window (Vogel et al. 2007, 10). That being said, the original materials that make up this matrix are also integral aspects of the historic value and artistic design of the panel and should be preserved. Steps should always be taken to ensure that panels retain their current matrix whenever possible, rather than opting for replacement (CVMA 2004).

=== Protective glazing ===
Figure 5 – A protective grill on the gothic-style windows of a chapel in London, UK

Protective glazing is one of the few ways conservators can attempt to preventively conserve stained glass in situ. While this practice can offer many benefits, as with most other treatments, it is not without drawbacks. Ideally, the installation of protective glazing can "relieve the stained glass of its function as a weather shield […], protect it against mechanical and atmospheric damage, and […] prevent condensation on the surface of the stained glass," thus minimising the need for interventive conservation (CVMA 2004). Unfortunately, in practice, this is not always the case, and it is well known that unsuitable, or improperly ventilated protective glazing can actually create an overly hot or humid microclimate around the historic glass that increases the rate of deterioration (Vogel et al. 2007, 13). Alternatively, protective screens or grills can be installed on the exterior of windows to prevent mechanical damage like vandalism, however, this can have a significant, negative impact on the aesthetic value of the windows from both the exterior and interior (figs. 4–5).

== Other options and considerations ==
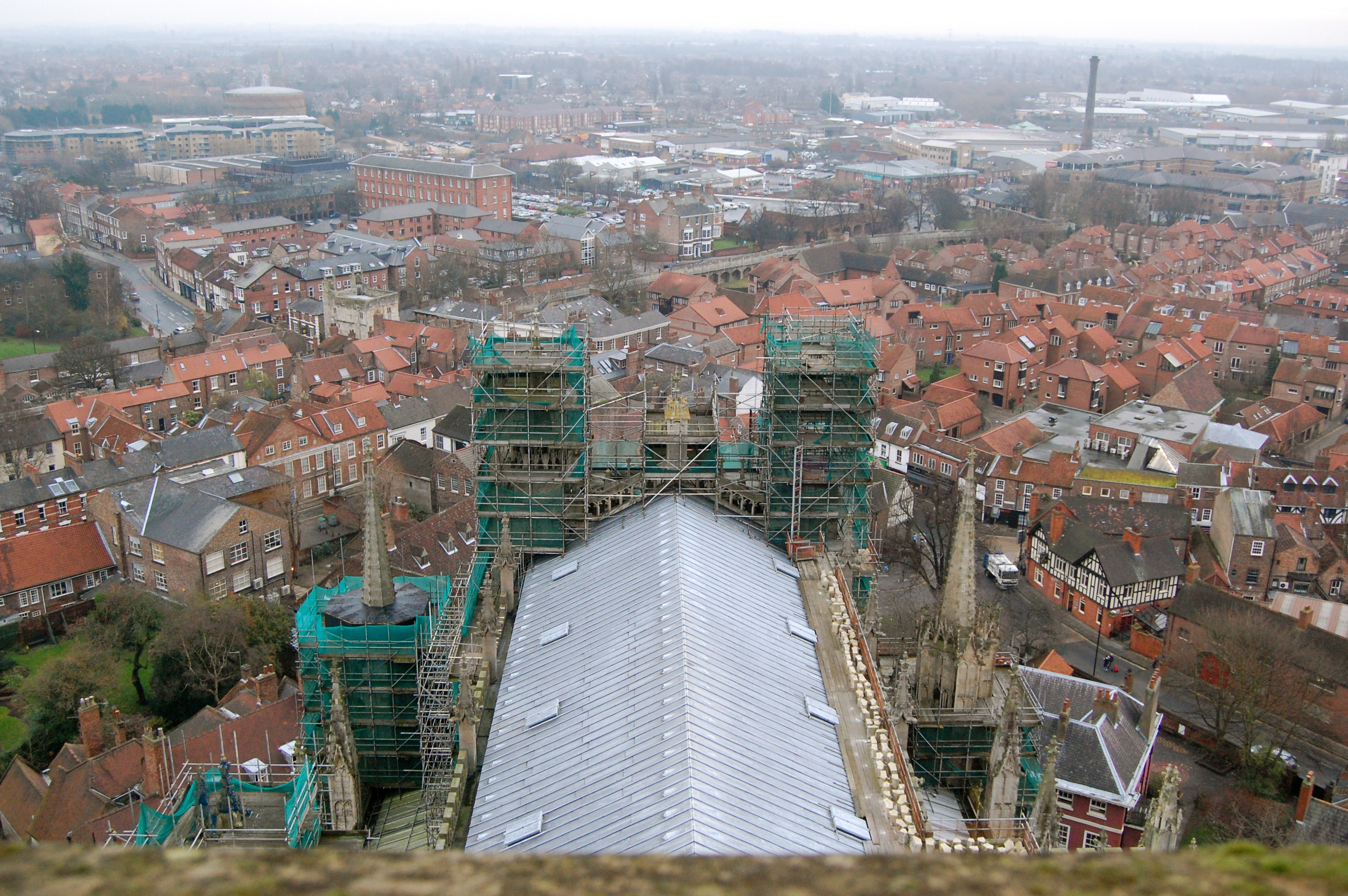
Figure 6 – A view of the conservation-related scaffolding around the east end of York Minster, England

In some cases, a project may be so extensive that it requires the complete removal of a panel, or set of panels from public view, which in turn raises other considerations concerning public access. An excellent example of such a case is the current, on-going project to conserve York Minster funded by the Heritage Lottery Fund (HLF), which raises the question: how do conservators accommodate the needs of the living, functioning Minster, without compromising conservation goals (fig. 6) (Rosewell 2008a)?

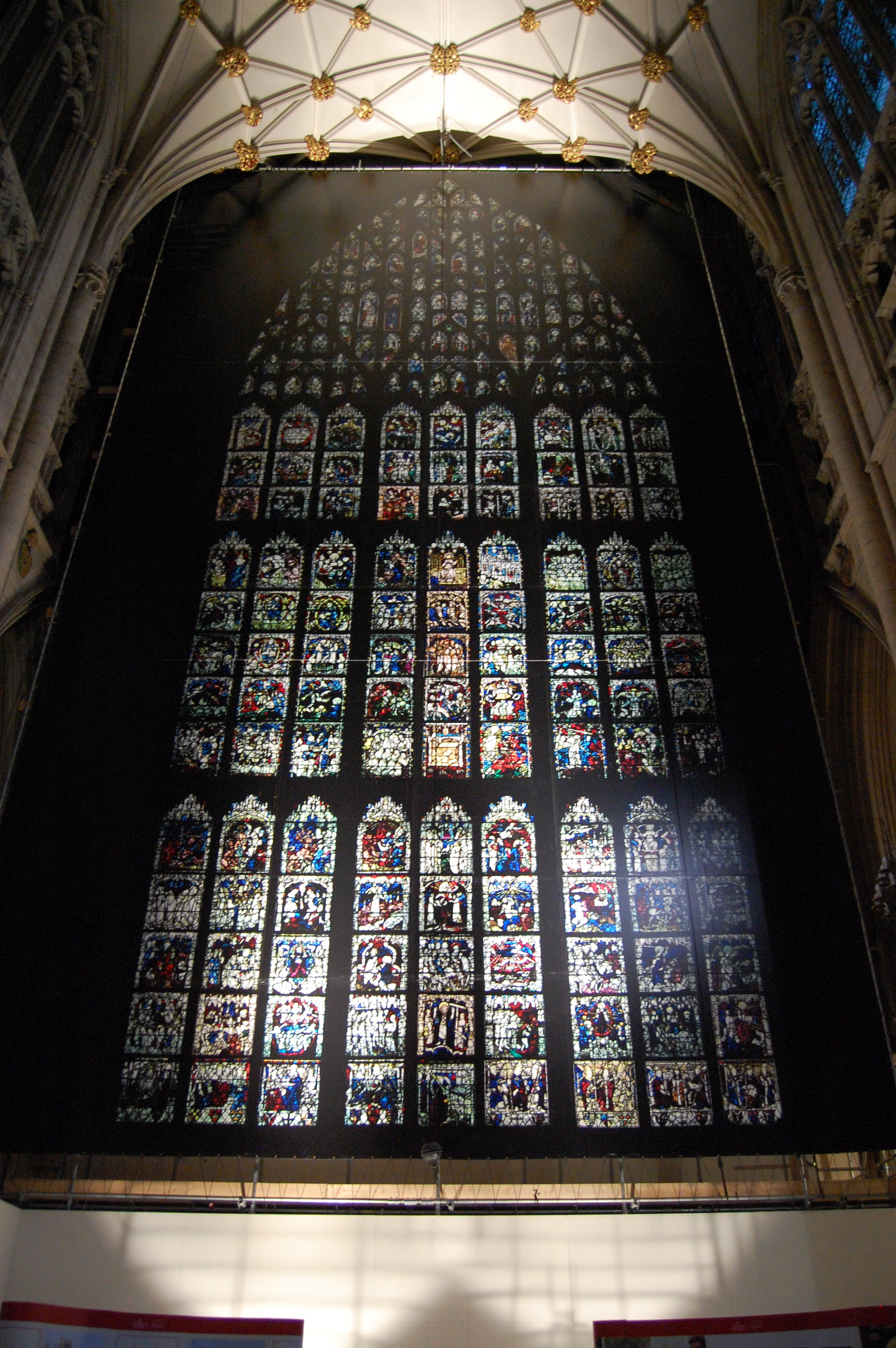
Figure 7 – A digitally produced replica of the Great East Window of York Minster

For instance, upon the removal of the Great East Window from public view (for up to ten years), a solution was needed to combat the sudden gloom of the Minster's interior. Ultimately, a remarkable life-sized, digital replica was produced to brighten the "visual 'black hole' that remains" while conservation work is taking place, thus facilitating the aims of conservators by minimising the detrimental effects of losing the visual impact window on the interior (fig. 7) (Rosewell 2008b). This is not the first time that York Minster has employed a variety of methods to maintain and increase public access while also facilitating the conservation of its stained glass legacy. Currently, conserved sections of panels that have been permanently removed from their original context due to conservation concerns can be viewed on display near the choir (fig. 8). Although it is rare that a perfect solution to these concerns can be found, it is a necessary part of conservation planning to take public interest and access into consideration.

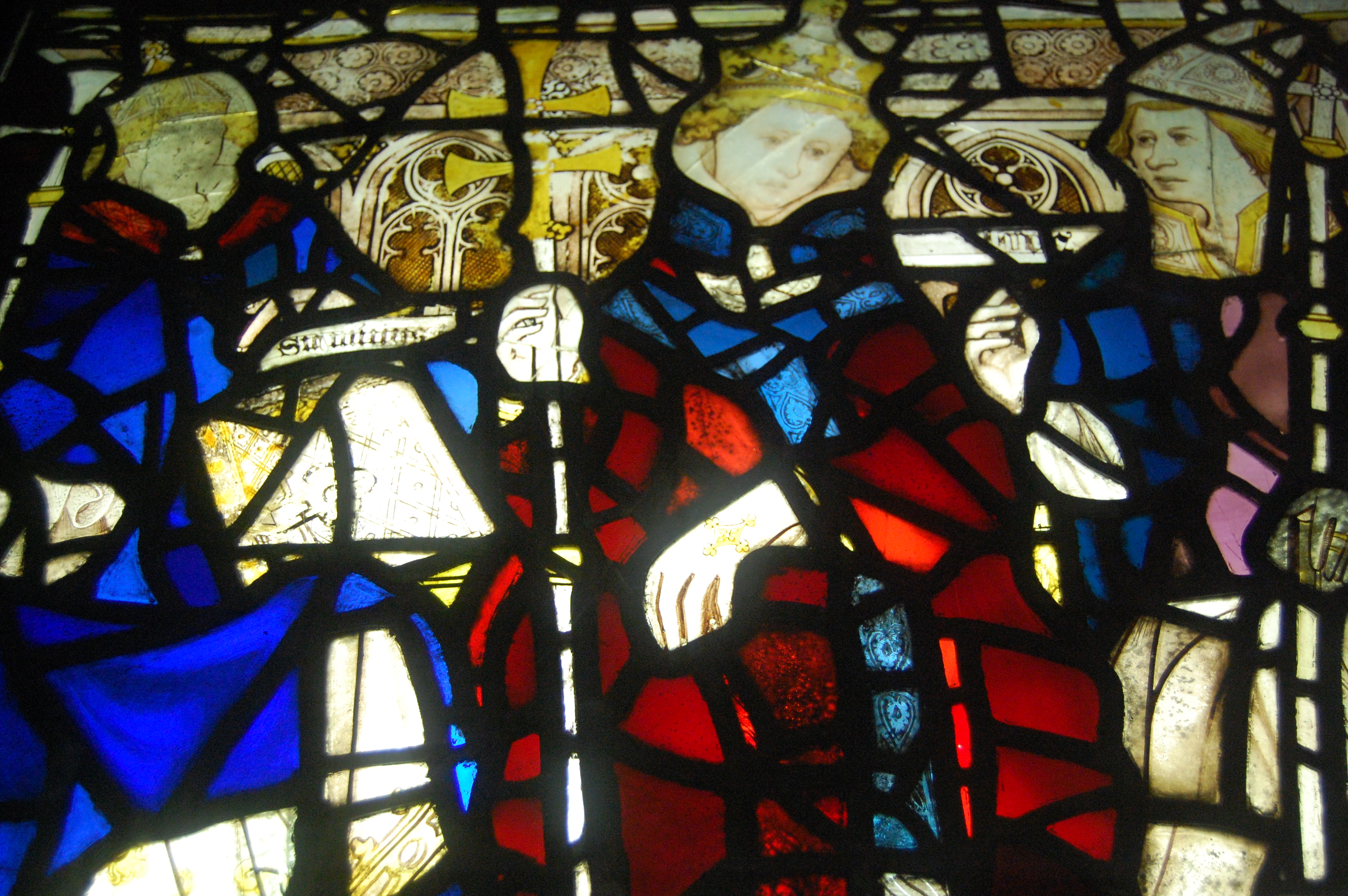
Figure 8 – Detail of a removed and restored panel from York Minster

== See also ==
- Architectural conservation
- Conservation-restoration
- Forest glass
- Stained glass
