= William W. Mullins =

American physicist and materials scientist

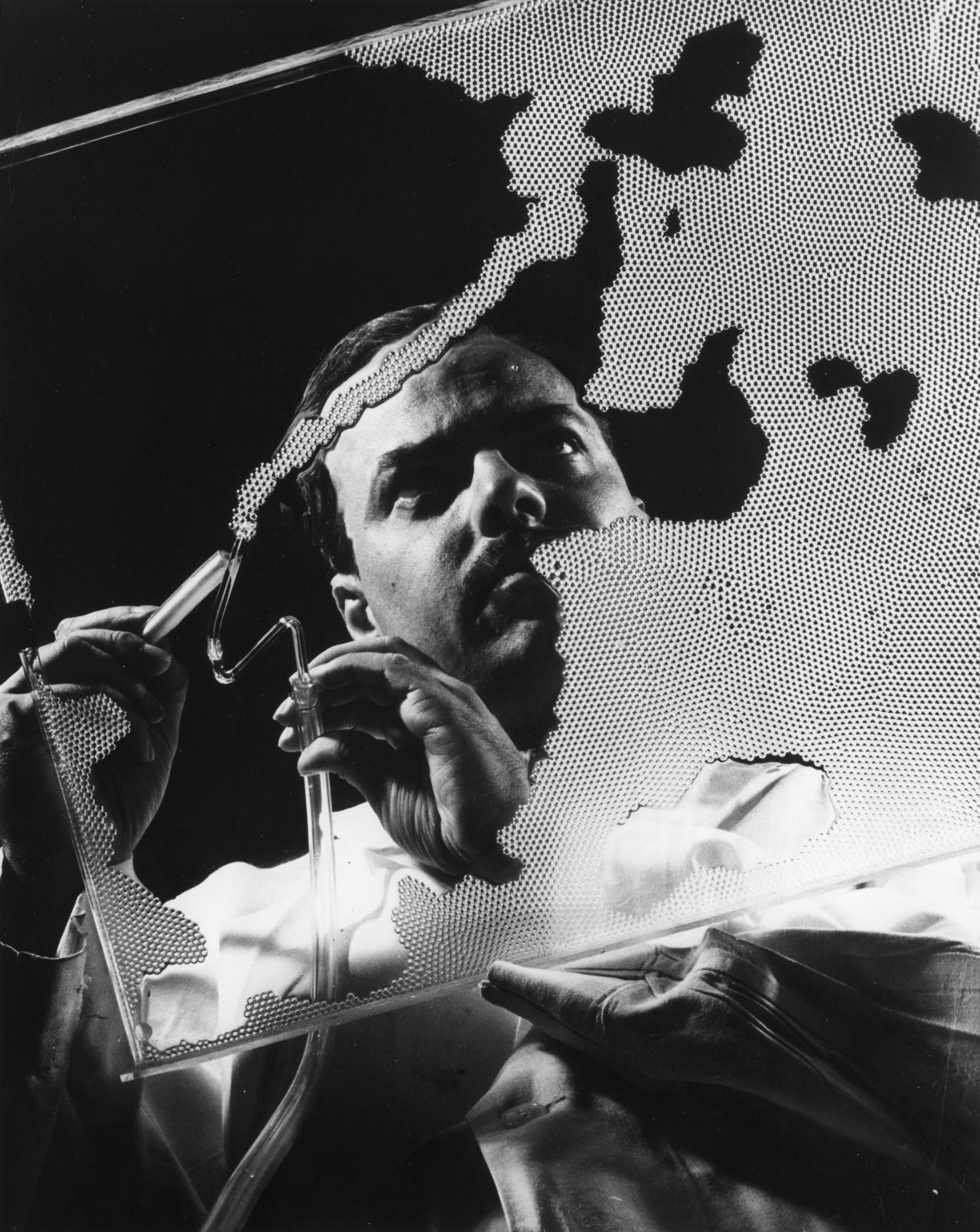
William W. Mullins illustrating crystal formation with soap bubbles

William Wilson Mullins (March 5, 1927 – April 22, 2001) was an American physicist and materials scientist and a professor at Carnegie Mellon University.

Mullins was born on March 5, 1927, in Boonville, Indiana, where his father was an industrialist and mayor; his uncle, George W. Mullins, was a mathematician at Columbia University. He was raised in Chicago after the family moved there in 1930. He was educated at the Lab School of the University of Chicago, served two years in the U.S. Navy, and then earned a bachelor's degree, master's degree, and Ph.D. from the University of Chicago, all in physics, in 1949, 1951, and 1955 respectively. His doctoral research, supervised by Cyril Stanley Smith, concerned the motion of grain boundaries in bismuth.

He continued his work on metal grain boundaries in his first job, at the Westinghouse Research Laboratories in Pittsburgh, from 1955 until 1960. He also served as an adjunct professor at the University of Pittsburgh in this time period. In 1960, he moved to the Carnegie Institute of Technology as an associate professor; his research there included work on surface scratching, crystal facetting, instabilities in shape formation of precipitates, and the effect of capillary forces on shape stability. Later in his career, he branched out to other topics beyond material science, including the distribution of lunar craters and optical caustics caused by the diffraction of light through moving water.

At the Carnegie, Mullins chaired the metallurgy department from 1963 until 1966, when he became dean of the institute. Under his leadership, the institute started a department of biological sciences, merged with the Mellon Institute to form Carnegie Mellon University, and split into two colleges of engineering and science within CMU. He stepped down as dean in 1970, becoming a professor of applied science. He was promoted to university professor in 1985, and retired in 1992.

Mullins won the Mathewson Gold Medal of the American Institute of Mining, Metallurgical, and Petroleum Engineers in 1963, the Philip M. McKenna Memorial Award in 1981, the Robert Franklin Mehl Award of The Minerals, Metals & Materials Society in 1994, the von Hippel Award of the Materials Research Society in 1995, the Cyril Stanley Smith Award of the International Conference on Grain Growth in 1998, and (posthumously) the Ross Coffin Purdy Award of the American Ceramic Society in 2002. He was elected to the National Academy of Sciences in 1984.

He died of cancer in Pittsburgh on April 22, 2001.
