= Cyril Stanley Smith =

British metallurgist (1903–1992)

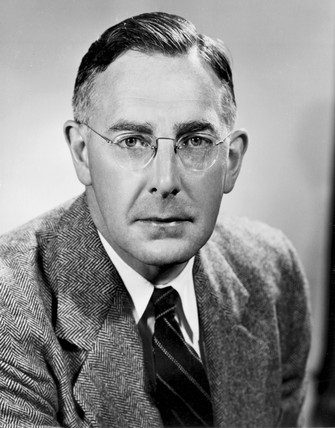
- Born: 4 October 1903; Birmingham, England
- Died: 25 August 1992 (aged 88); Cambridge, Massachusetts, USA
- Education: University of Birmingham; Massachusetts Institute of Technology
- Known for: metallurgy production of fissionable metals
- Awards: Medal for Merit (1946); Francis J. Clamer Medal (1952); Andrew Gemant Award (1991)
- Scientific career
- Workplaces: American Brass Company; Los Alamos Laboratory; University of Chicago; Massachusetts Institute of Technology
- Doctoral students: William W. Mullins

Cyril Stanley Smith (4 October 1903 – 25 August 1992) was a British metallurgist and historian of science. He is most famous for his work on the Manhattan Project where he was responsible for the production of fissionable metals. A graduate of the University of Birmingham and Massachusetts Institute of Technology (MIT), Smith worked for many years as a research metallurgist at the American Brass Company. During World War II he worked in the Chemical-Metallurgical Division of the Los Alamos Laboratory, where he purified, cast and shaped uranium-235 and plutonium, a metal hitherto available only in microgram amounts, and whose properties were largely unknown. After the war he served on the Atomic Energy Commission's influential General Advisory Committee, and the President's Science Advisory Committee.

Smith founded the Institute for the Study of Metals at the University of Chicago, the first interdisciplinary academic organization devoted to the study of metals in the United States. He studied the details of faults and grain boundaries in metals, and developed theoretical models of them. In 1961, he moved to MIT as an Institute Professor with appointments in both the Departments of Humanities and Metallurgy. He applied the techniques of metallurgy to the study of the production methods used to create artefacts such as samurai swords.

== Early life ==
Smith was born in Birmingham, England, on 4 October 1903, the third of four children of Joseph Seymour Smith, a commercial traveller for Camp Coffee, and his wife, Frances, née Norton. He was educated at Bishop Vesey's Grammar School in Sutton Coldfield. He read metallurgy at the University of Birmingham, having not met the requirements in mathematics to study his first choice, which was physics, and was awarded a second-class BSc in 1924.

That year Smith entered the Massachusetts Institute of Technology (MIT), where he earned a ScD in 1926. He was a research associate at MIT from 1926 to 1927, then left to take up a position as a research metallurgist at the American Brass Company. His research there was mainly involved with the electrical, thermal, and mechanical and magnetic properties of copper alloys. He published numerous papers, and was awarded 20 patents.

He married Alice Marchant Kimball, a student of English social history at Yale University, from which she earned a PhD in 1936, on 16 March 1931. Of the marriage, Alice's sister remarked that: "If he didn't go to Oxford or Cambridge, isn't Church of England, and doesn't like sports, you might as well marry an American". He became a naturalized American citizen in 1939. His wife sparked an interest in history, a subject that he had disliked at school. He acquired old texts, and in 1945 he produced a translation of a classic metallurgical text, Vannocio Biringuccio's De la pirotechnia (1540).

== World War II ==
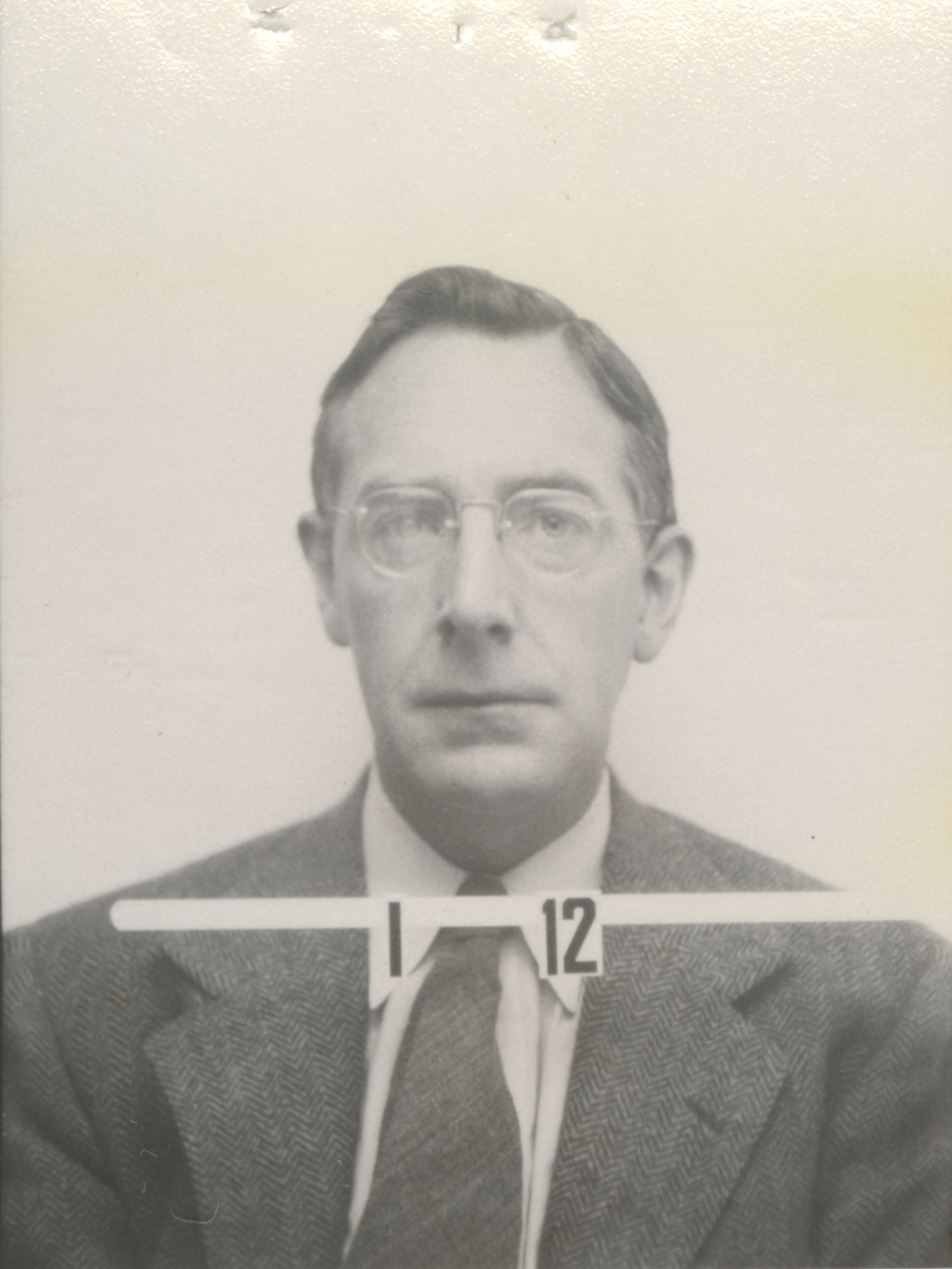
Cyril Smith's Los Alamos badge

In 1942, during World War II, he was called into service at the War Metallurgy Committee in Washington, D.C. In April 1943 he went to work on the Manhattan Project, joining the Chemical-Metallurgical Division at the Los Alamos Laboratory as the head of its Metallurgy Group. When the laboratory was reorganized in April 1944, he became the Associate Division Leader in charge of metallurgy. His first task was recruiting metallurgists, who were in great demand by the war effort. He also had to arrange for the transport of their metallurgical equipment to Los Alamos under wartime conditions.

Smith's metallurgists found ways of fabricating boron, producing beryllium bricks, and heat-treating steel. They also had to work with uranium. Frank Spedding had developed a large-scale process for producing pure uranium metal at the Ames Laboratory which was fine for producing tons of feed for the nuclear reactors, but enriched uranium could not be handled in this way, as it would form a critical mass. Smith was initially asked to produce cubes of uranium hydride, which he did, but the 1950s uranium hydride bomb tests were found to be inefficient, and the idea was set aside for the duration, although further work was carried out after the war. By July 1944, they were producing pure uranium metal in 200g amounts with a newly devised process.

But by far the biggest challenge for Smith and his group was plutonium, a metal hitherto available only in microgram amounts, and whose properties were largely unknown. It was initially assumed that plutonium would have properties similar to that of uranium, but this assumption turned out to be invalid. Plutonium proved to be "the most complicated metal known to man". There were found to be six allotropes of plutonium, more than any other metal, and its melting point turned out to be hundreds of degrees lower than uranium. The metallurgists found that at around 125 °C, plutonium expanded in volume by 20 percent, which is unusual.

Plutonium was delivered to Los Alamos in the form of what was found to be a mixture of plutonium trifluoride (PuF_{3}) and plutonium tetrafluoride (PuF_{4}). Work with plutonium was carried out in gloveboxes for safety reasons. The metallurgists figured out how to purify the plutonium, and found that heating it to 250° allowed them to work it in the malleable γ phase. It was also found that alloying it with 3 percent gallium would stabilize it in the δ phase. When plutonium at last began to arrive in quantity from the Hanford Site in February 1945, they were ready for production. In a race against the clock, the metallurgists produced plutonium spheres for the Trinity nuclear test by 23 July 1945.

Smith was awarded the Medal for Merit by President Harry S. Truman for these activities in 1946.

== University of Chicago ==
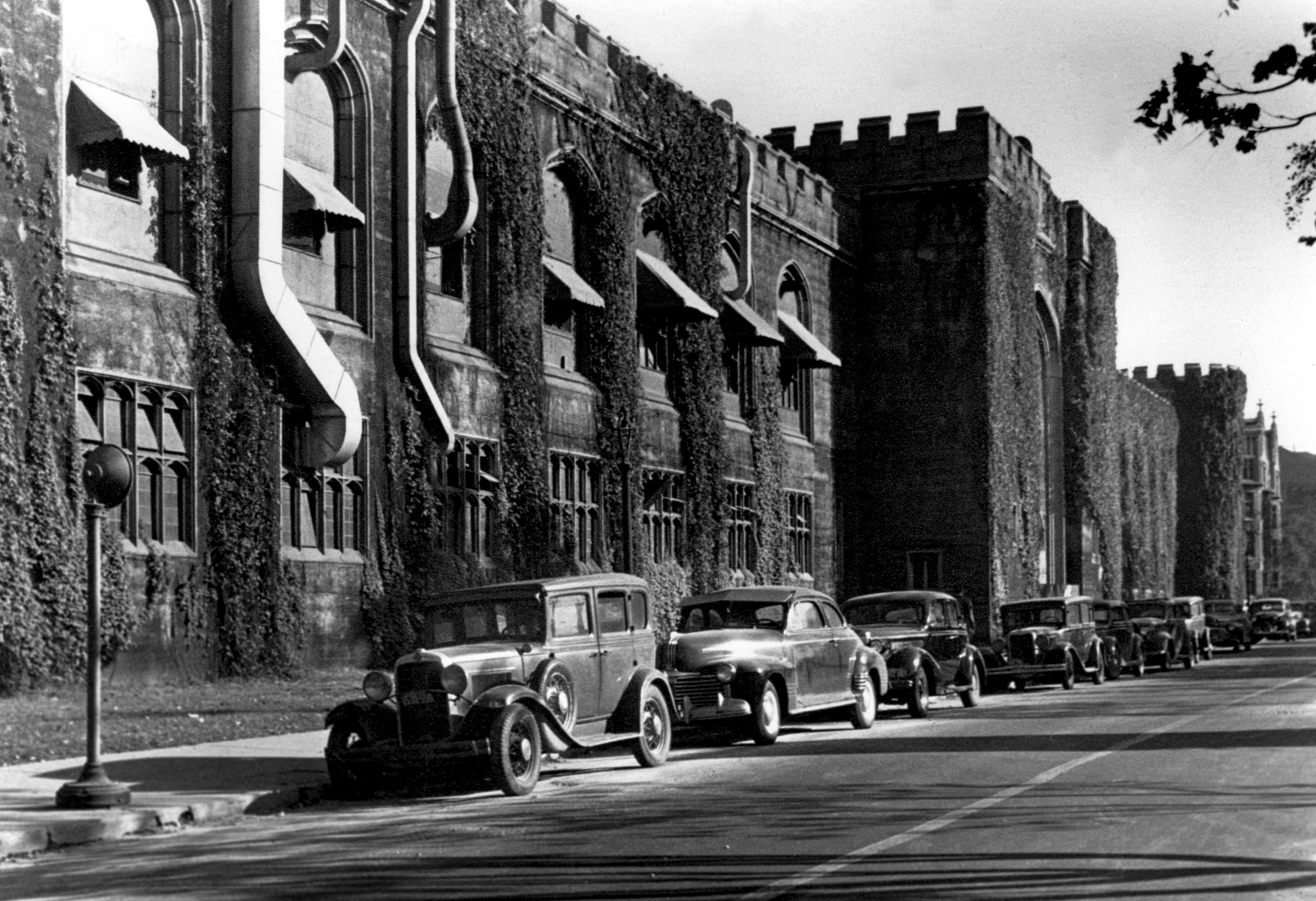
The Institute for the Study of Metals was located in the old Stagg Field until 1951

After the war Smith founded the Institute for the Study of Metals at the University of Chicago, the first interdisciplinary academic organization devoted to the study of metals in the United States. He considered it "a natural outgrowth of the close association of metallurgists with chemists and physicists on the Manhattan Project." He developed methods for deriving the three-dimensional shapes of the crystalline structures of metals from the two-dimensional microscope images of the grains of the metals. He also studied the propagation of induced phase changes in metals. He was fascinated by the details of faults and grain boundaries in metals, and developed theoretical models of them. Perhaps his most influential paper was on "Grain Shapes and Other Metallurgical Applications of Topology" (1952), an explanation of metallic microstructure. He was awarded a Guggenheim Fellowship in 1955 to study the History of Science and Technology.

From 12 December 1946 to 10 January 1952, Smith served on the influential General Advisory Committee of the Atomic Energy Commission (AEC). Chaired by Robert Oppenheimer, the wartime director of the Los Alamos Laboratory, the General Advisory Committee provided policy as well as technical advice to the commissioners. One of Smith's first papers for the commission recommended that it concentrate on the development of fast breeder reactors and high flux reactors. A 1948 visit to England to discuss plutonium metallurgy with British scientists nearly escalated into an international incident, as Senator Bourke Hickenlooper and Secretary of Defense James Forrestal feared that he would give atomic secrets away to the British. Smith did no such thing; but AEC Commissioner Sumner Pike faced severe criticism for authorizing Smith's visit. In common with other members of the General Advisory Committee, Smith opposed the development of the hydrogen bomb on technical and moral grounds. He also served on the National Academy of Sciences' Committee on Science, Engineering, and Public Policy and the President's Science Advisory Committee. Smith was elected to the American Academy of Arts and Sciences in 1950, the American Philosophical Society in 1955, and the United States National Academy of Sciences in 1957.

== Massachusetts Institute of Technology ==
In 1961, Smith moved to MIT as an Institute Professor with appointments in both the Departments of Humanities and Metallurgy. His focus was to transplant the techniques of metallurgy into the study of the production methods used to create artefacts discovered by archaeologists such as samurai swords. In his role of teaching the history of science, he argued that important advances were often the result of curiosity rather than the pursuit of defined goals. He was interested in the scientific aspects of fine arts, and published several works linking the arts with the sciences. He lectured about this at the Smithsonian Institution's Freer Gallery of Art and the Arthur M. Sackler Gallery in Washington, DC.

Smith received numerous awards, including the Franklin Institute's Francis J. Clamer Medal in 1952, and the History of Science Society's Pfizer Medal and American Society for Metals' Gold Medal in 1961. He was awarded the Society for the History of Technology's Leonardo da Vinci Medal in 1966, and the Institute of Metals' Platinum Medal in 1970. In 1981, Cyril Stanley Smith received the Dexter Award for Outstanding Achievement in the History of Chemistry from the American Chemical Society. In 1991 he received the American Institute of Physics' Andrew Gemant Award for "pioneering the use of solid state physics in the study of ancient art and artefacts to reconstruct their cultural, historical and technological significance." He was also a member of the editorial board of the Bulletin of the Atomic Scientists.

On retirement from MIT in 1969, Smith became a professor emeritus of the History of Science and Technology, professor emeritus of Metallurgy and Humanities and Institute Professor Emeritus, an unusual title "reserved for only a few whose work transcends the boundaries of traditional departments and disciplines". He died of colonic cancer in his Cambridge, Massachusetts home on 25 August 1992. He was survived by his wife of sixty years, Alice Kimball Smith, his two children, Anne Smith Denman, chair of the Department of Anthropology at Central Washington University, and Stuart Marchant Smith, a marine geologist at the Scripps Institution of Oceanography, and a sister, Mary Smith. His papers are in the Niels Bohr Library in College Park, Maryland. His collection of antiquarian metallurgical texts was left to the Burndy Library at the Dibner Institute for the History of Science and Technology.

== Selected works ==
- Smith, Cyril S. (1952). "Grain Shapes and Other Metallurgical Applications of Topology". Metal interfaces: a seminar on metal interfaces held during the Thirty-third National Metal Congress and Exposition, Detroit, October 13 to 19, 1951; sponsored by the American Society for Metals. Cleveland: American Society for Metals. pp. 65–108.
- Smith, Cyril S. (1968). Sources for the History of the Science of Steel 1532–1786. Cambridge, Massachusetts: Society for the History of Technology.
- Smith, Cyril Stanley & Hawthorne, John G. (1974). "Mappae Clavicula: A Little Key to the World of Medieval Techniques". Transactions of the American Philosophical Society. 64 (4). American Philosophical Society: 1–128. doi:10.2307/1006317. JSTOR 1006317.
- Smith, Cyril S. (1980). From Art to Science. Cambridge, Massachusetts: MIT Press. ISBN 0-262-19181-4.
- Smith, Cyril S. (1981). A Search for Structure: Selected Essays on Science, Art and History. Cambridge, Massachusetts: MIT Press. ISBN 0-262-19191-1.
- Smith, Cyril S. (1988). History of Metallography: The Development of Ideas on the Structure of Metals Before 1890. Cambridge, Massachusetts: MIT Press. ISBN 0-262-69120-5.
- Vannocio Biringuccio (January 1990). The Pirotechnia of Vanoccio Biringuccio (in Italian). Dover. ISBN 0-486-26134-4. 20th Century translation by Cyril Stanley Smith and Martha Teach Gnudi
- Hawthorne, John G. & Smith, Cyril Stanley (1979). Theophilus: On Divers Arts. New York: Dover. ISBN 0-486-23784-2.
