= Alice Kimball Smith =

American historian

- Born: Alice Marchant Kimball; May 8, 1907; Oak Park, Illinois, United States
- Died: February 6, 2001 (aged 93)
- Education: Mount Holyoke College; Yale University
- Occupations: Author, historian

Alice Kimball Smith (1907–2001) was an American historian, writer, and teacher, particularly known from her writing from personal experience on the Manhattan Project.

== Early life and education ==
Smith was born in Oak Park, Illinois in 1907. She first went to college at Mount Holyoke College where she obtained her A.B in 1928. Eight years later, she got her PhD from Yale University.

== War years ==
In 1943 she and her husband Cyril moved to Los Alamos when her husband joined the Manhattan Project. She soon got a teaching job in Los Alamos where she and her husband became friends with J. Robert Oppenheimer and his wife Kitty. She would use her experiences around Los Alamos as material in her future books. Smith, in her study of American A-bomb scientists interviewed many Los Alamos scientists who gave blank answers about the nature of the weapon that they were creating.

== Post war years ==
Smith and her husband moved to Chicago after World War II ended. Smith became the Bulletin of the Atomic Scientists assistant editor where she worked for many years. She was a lecturer at Roosevelt College and a dean, assistant dean and scholar at Radcliffe Institute for Independent Study. Smith also briefly was a guest columnist in The New York Times in 1983.

== Books ==
Smith's books include A Peril and a Hope: The Scientists' Movement in America, 1945–1947 and co edited (with Charles Weiner) Robert Oppenheimer: Letters and Recollections with the latter being a collection of letters from J. Robert Oppenheimer between 1922 and 1945. Her book A Peril and a Hope: The Scientist' Movement in America, 1945–1947 was nominated for a National Book Award for Nonfiction in the Science, Philosophy and Religion category. A Peril and a Hope was about the growing negative sentiment of scientists about creating the atomic bomb due to their concerns over the sociopolitical consequences of its usage.

== Personal life ==
Alice Kimball was married to British metallurgist Cyril Smith. She died on February 6, 2001, at her home in Ellensburg, Washington.
