= Classical Philology (journal) =

- Discipline: Classics
- Language: English
- Edited by: Sarah Nooter

Publication details
- History: 1906–present
- Publisher: University of Chicago Press for the Department of Classics, Division of the Humanities, University of Chicago (United States)
- Frequency: Quarterly

Standard abbreviations
- ISO 4: Class. Philol.

Indexing
- ISSN: 0009-837X (print); 1546-072X (web)
- JSTOR: 0009837x

Links
- Journal homepage

Classical Philology is a peer-reviewed academic journal established in 1906. It is published by the University of Chicago Press and covers all aspects of Graeco-Roman antiquity, including literature, languages, anthropology, history, social life, philosophy, religion, art, material culture, and the history of classical studies. The editor-in-chief is Sarah Nooter.
