= No. 2 grenade =

No. 2 Grenade
- Type: Hand grenade
- Place of origin: United Kingdom

Service history
- Used by: United Kingdom, Mexico, France
- Wars: Mexican Revolution, World War I

Production history
- Designer: Marten Hales
- Designed: 1907
- Manufacturer: Cotton Powder Company
- Produced: 1907–1910s?
- Variants: Mk II (shorter handle and multiple cloth streamers),

Specifications
- Mass: 1 lb (0.45kg)
- Filling: Tonite
- Detonation mechanism: Percussion fuse (i.e. impact detonated)

The No. 2 grenade (also known as Hales pattern and Mexican pattern) is a percussion cap fragmentation and rifle grenade used by the United Kingdom during World War I.

== Operation ==
To use the grenade, the detonator is inserted, the safety pin is pulled out, and the grenade is then thrown. Streamers on the grenade are designed to stabilize the grenade's flight so that it always lands head-first.

== History ==
=== Adoption ===
The No. 2 was created by Frederick Marten Hale in 1907. It was first used in the Mexican Revolution and was produced by the Cotton Power Company under contract from the Mexican government. France also purchased some as rifle grenades. The United States tested the No. 2 as a potential grenade, but it was not adopted. When World War I broke out, it soon became obvious that the standard British grenade, the No. 1 grenade, could not be produced fast enough to meet with demand. To help meet supply, the British government purchased all of the No. 2 grenades made by the Cotton Powder Company.

=== Supply ===
Like the No. 1, the No. 2 required a special detonator that was similar to the one used in the No. 1. This made it even more difficult to get adequate supplies of the No. 2 to the troops and further tied up supplies. Arguably, the No. 2 made the grenade problem worse for the British, as there had to be separate detonators for the No. 1 and No. 2 that could only be made by a small group of firms.

Later on, the No. 2's explosive was changed to Tonite so that it could accept more common detonators. It is unknown if this actually increased supply.

The grenade was officially declared obsolete in 1920, but it is likely that the No. 2 stopped being used by British forces in 1916.

== Variants ==
=== Mk I and II ===
There were two variants of the No. 2 created, the Mk I and Mk II. The Mk I has a 16 in (41 cm) long handle and one cloth streamer, while the Mk II has a seven-inch long handle and multiple cloth streamers.

=== Rifle grenade ===
The rifle grenade variant of the No. 2 comes in two forms, 7mm and 8mm. The 7mm model was produced for Mexico and was designed to fit into the M95 Mauser rifle used by the Mexican Army, while the 8mm model was designed to be used in the Lebel rifle. The only difference between the models is that the 7mm has a clip attached to it to make it properly fit the M95, while the 8mm model does not.

The 7mm variant was used by the British as a temporary rifle grenade until others, such as the Hales rifle grenade, were developed.

=== Aerial bomb ===
A modified version of the No. 2 was used as a weapon by the Royal Flying Corps. Instead of a handle, the aerial bomb variant has only a cloth streamer.
