= Hales rifle grenade =

Hales rifle grenade (Nos. 3, 20, 24, 35)
- Type: Percussion cap grenade
- Place of origin: United Kingdom

Service history
- In service: 1915-?
- Used by: United Kingdom
- Wars: World War I

Production history
- Designed: 1915–1918
- Produced: 1915-?

Specifications
- Mass: 1 lb 5 oz (No. 3), 1 lb 8 oz (No. 20 Mk I)
- Filling: Tonite and TNT for the No. 3, Ammonal for No. 20 and grenades based on it.
- Detonation mechanism: Percussion cap fuse

The Hales rifle grenade is the name for several rifle grenades used by British forces during World War I. All of these are based on the No. 3 design.

== Operation ==
To fire the No. 3, the user would fit the grenade into the rifle, insert the detonator, lay the rifle on the ground in the correct position, remove the safety pin, pull back the safety pin collar, insert a special blank round into the rifle, then fire.

=== Operation variants ===
With variants that lack the vale, the grenade was activated in exactly the same way as the ones that have a vale, but the user did not need to remove the safety pin collar, as it lacks one.

== History ==
In 1907, Frederick Marten Hale (sometimes Martin) developed the rod grenade. "A simple rod was attached to a specialized grenade, inserted into the barrel of a standard service rifle and launched using a blank cartridge." However, the British did not immediately adopt the idea and entered World War I without any rifle grenades. As soon as trench warfare started, however, there was a sudden need for rifle grenades. The British government purchased a rodded variant of the No. 2 grenade as a temporary solution.

By 1915 Hale had developed the No. 3, which is commonly known as the Hales rifle grenade. The Hales grenade was improved throughout World War I to make it more reliable and easier to manufacture. However, production of the grenade was slow. In order to speed rod grenades to the front, the British also made rodded versions of the Mills bomb.

Although a simple approach, launching a rod grenade "...placed an extreme amount of stress on the rifle barrel and the rifle itself, resulting in the need to dedicate specific rifles to the grenade launching role, as they quickly became useless as an accurate firearm. This led to the search for an alternative and resulted in the reappearance of the cup launcher during the latter years of World War I." After World War I, the rod-type rifle grenade was declared obsolete and the remaining Hales were replaced with Mills bombs shot from a rifle via a cup launcher.

== Variants ==
The Hales went through many variations in order to make it more cost effective and effective.

=== No. 3 ===
The No. 3 started off as the No. 3 Mk I. It has an externally segmented body and a wind vane designed to help activate the detonator in mid flight. It uses either Tonite or TNT as its explosive.

The No. 3 had several problems; it was difficult to manufacture, as it required precision and was made up of many parts. Another problem occurred with the detonators; like the No. 1 grenade, the No. 3 needed a special detonator that was difficult to manufacture. This detonator was also used in the No. 2 grenade and was very similar to the one in the No. 1 grenade, which made it harder to mass-produce.

Practically, the vane was a significant problem; it was hard to align properly and adverse weather, such as rain, strong winds or even a particle of dust could prevent the vane from operating correctly, which caused a failure.

The No. 3 also had an overly sensitive percussion cap, which caused many premature detonations.

Once these problems became well known, further development was begun. The No. 20 was the result of these refinements.

=== No. 20 ===
The No. 20 was similar to the No. 3, but its main difference was that it lacked No. 3's vane. In theory this was supposed to make it more reliable than the No. 3 and the main problem of the design was the choice of explosive used. Instead of Tonite or TNT, the No. 20 used ammonite, which tended to corrode the brass parts of the grenade, which created several failures when it was fired.

While an improvement over the No. 3, the No. 20 still had design flaws, and the No. 24 was introduced to address some of the remaining problems.

The No. 20 had two variants, the Mk I and II. The Mk I had a solid steel cylinder body, very similar to the No. 3, while the Mk II used a weldless steel tube and had circumferential grooves for fragmentation.

=== No. 24 ===
The No. 24 was essentially a No. 20 with a less sensitive percussion cap and refined ammonite that did not corrode the brass parts of the grenade.

There were two variants of the No. 24, the Mk I and II. The Mk I used the No. 20 Mk II's body, while the Mk II incorporated a cast iron body that has no external grooves.

=== No. 35 ===
In 1918 the No. 35 was introduced. This was a No. 24 MK II that had a detonator holder that used a small arms cartridge and a shorter striker.

== See also ==
- No. 2 grenade (Mexican pattern' hand grenade)
