= Frederick Marten Hale =

British war engineer

Hale (far right) at a 1908 demonstration of his rifle grenade at Faversham to the naval and military attachés of foreign governments

Frederick Marten Hale (1864 – 2 February 1931) was a British explosives engineer and inventor. After education at the Devon County School and in Brussels, Belgium, Hale worked in hydraulic and fire engineering. He became involved in the design and manufacture of explosives from 1895 and rose to positions at the Cotton Powder Company and the Roburite & Ammonal company. Hale saw the successful use of hand grenades in the 1904–05 Russo-Japanese War and designed his own grenade in 1906. This was rejected by the War Office but during the 1914–1918 First World War it was used by the British Army as the No. 2 grenade.

Hale became the predominant British designer of grenades in the pre-war era. He developed the Hales rifle grenade which was exported to several states but did not see extensive use until the First World War. With the coming of trench warfare the army requested large quantities. Hale struggled to meet these demands owing to its complicated design and fuse, which was manufactured by Dynamit Nobel. Hale refined his design three times during the war to make it simpler, safer and more reliable. Some 10 million were used during the war. Hale also developed an aircraft bomb, which was used successfully by British aircraft against German Zeppelin airships on the ground and in the air, and a depth charge. After the war he successfully sued the British government for infringing his rifle grenade patents.

== Early life and career ==
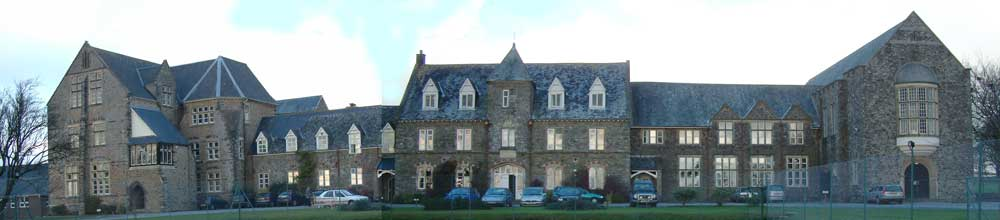
Devon County School

Frederick Marten Hale was born in Bristol in 1864, the son of Matthew Henry Hale. He received an education at Devon County School in West Buckland and in Brussels, Belgium. Hale initially specialised in hydraulic engineering and fire engineering. After four years, in 1895, he switched to the design and manufacture of explosives. He became a director of the Cotton Powder Company and also controlled the Roburite & Ammonal company, both of which manufactured explosives for use in mining and warfare. Hale lived at Bromley in Kent. He was a member of the Junior Constitutional Club, the Bromley and County Club and Sundridge Park Golf Club.

== No. 2 grenade ==
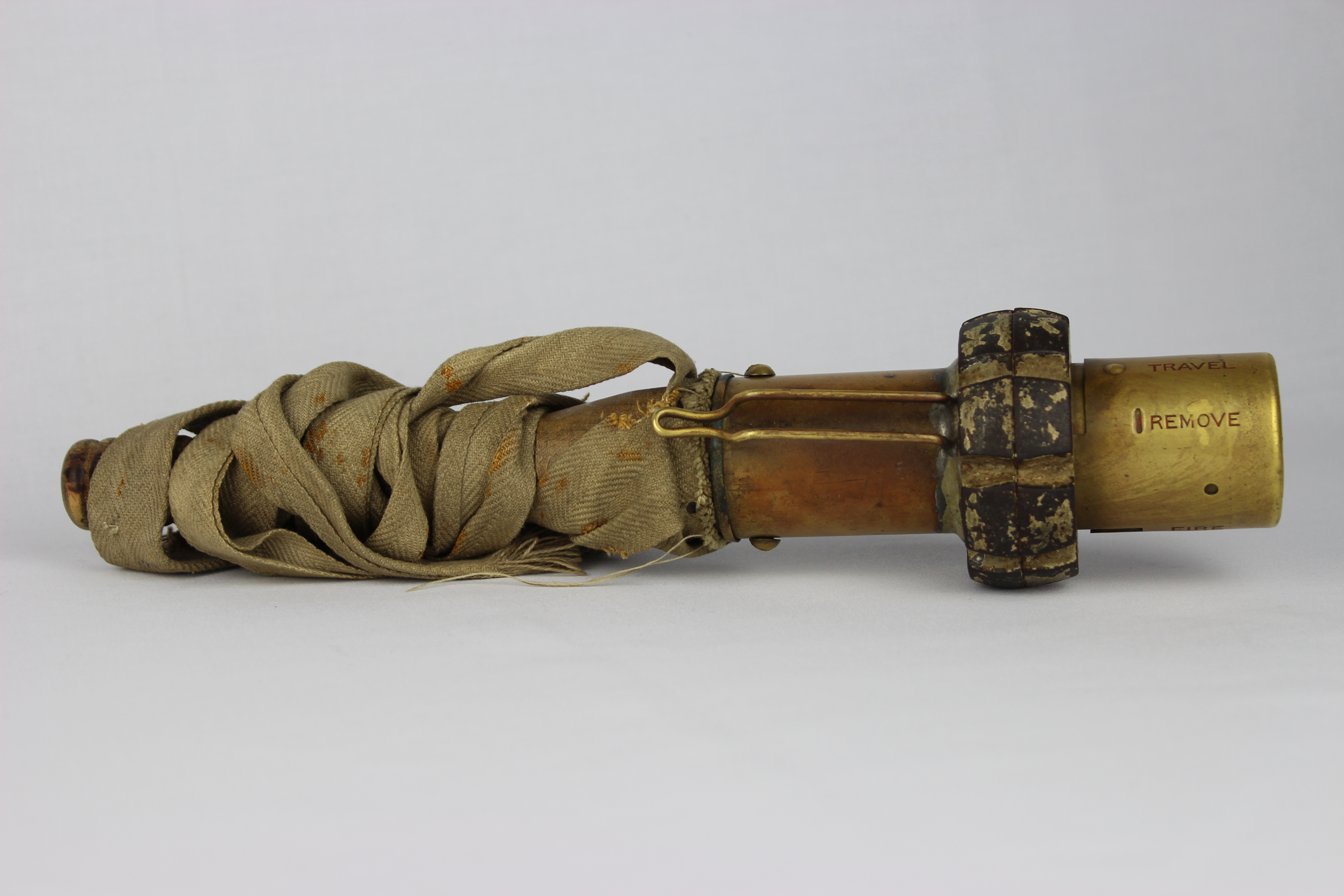
The no. 1 grenade

The British War Office had declared hand grenades obsolete in 1902 and ceased work on modern versions. However Japanese troops used the weapons to good effect during the 1904-05 Russo-Japanese War, a fact reported by a British military observer Lieutenant Colonel Aylmer Haldane who also brought back an example of the grenades used. The War Office determined that the weapons might be useful in assaulting fortresses and the Royal Laboratory was commissioned to produce an example. The Laboratory's struggled to replicate the Japanese design but in 1906 produced a version which became the No. 1 grenade. After testing it was considered to be somewhat overengineered but was adopted by the army in 1908. Production was low and only 420 were produced by the start of the First World War in 1914.

During this period Hale also became interested in grenades. He may have been inspired by reports of the weapon's use in Manchuria or have viewed Haldane's example. It is also known that Hale discussed grenades with a Japanese army officer at some point between 1906 and 1908. Hale patented his grenade, which would eventually become the British Army's No. 2 grenade, in 1906. The War Office considered it inferior to the No. 1 grenade and thought it was more liable to misfire. Hales made a number of improvements to his design and demonstrated it to the Chief Superintendent of the Ordnance Factories at the Cotton Powder Company's Faversham works in 1908. It was again rejected, this time as it was considered too difficult to throw in a trench. The No. 1 grenade had the same drawback and the War Office seems to have rejected Hale's design as the No.1, being designed and manufactured in house, was cheaper to produce. With the outbreak of the war in 1914 the army, short of any alternatives, adopted the No. 2 grenade.

== Rifle grenades ==
January 1913 advert by the Cotton Powder Company for the Hales rifle grenade

With little War Office interest in the field in the pre-war years Hale came to dominate grenade development. He was granted 11 patents for hand grenades and rifle grenades between 1906 and the start of the First World War. He developed the Hales rifle grenade in 1908 and marketed it widely, demonstrating the weapon to representatives from 18 countries including France, Germany, Russia, Mexico and Spain. It was dismissed by the chief draftsman at the Woolwich Arsenal as "a crazy and audacious monstrosity" that was likely to burst rifle barrels. Hale sold a number of grenades to Germany in 1911 but they were not selected for service. He exported the rifle grenade to government of Mexico where they were used during the Mexican Revolution, and to Brazil leading to an association of the weapon with suppression of disorder and with colonial warfare. By 1911 Hale had modified the grenade to incorporate a wind vane. The grenade would not detonate unless the wind vane was activated by flight, avoiding the danger of a grenade detonating in front of the user after falling off the rifle.

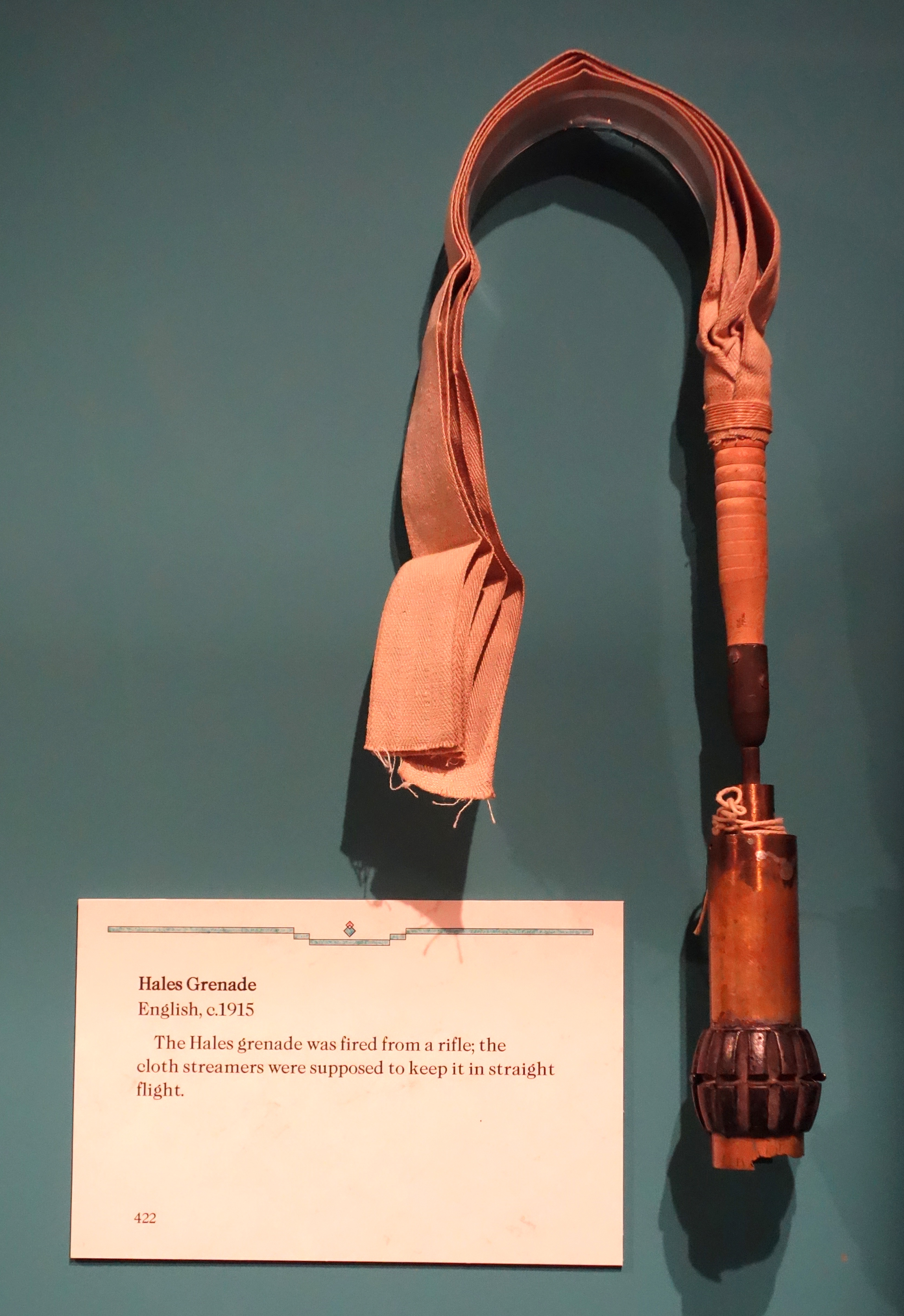
A Hales grenade from c. 1915

Hale's rifle grenade was accepted by the British Army in 1913 but by the start of the First World War only a single box of 50 grenades was on hand. It was the only rifle grenade available to the British Army at that point of the war. The army did not make great use of the weapon until the rise of trench warfare on the Western Front. With increased demand Hale manufactured the grenade at both the Cotton Powder Company and Roburite & Ammonal. The detonators, however, were manufactured by Dynamit Nobel and their availability limited Hale's production outputs. Hale's grenade was also complex to manufacture and its machined steel body took longer to produce than a simple cast iron one would. By 1915 the weapon was still only available in small quantities.

Hale's dominance of the field in the pre-war years had led to a lack of work by competitors so alternatives were not forthcoming. During the war the Royal Laboratory failed to produce a rifle grenade that could compete with Hale's. The army's field workshops, under Captain Henry Newton, had more success and from 1915 manufactured a number of No. 22 grenades (Newton-Pippin rifle grenades). These were made from cast iron and scrap brass and cost just two shillings each, compared to 25 shillings for the Hales grenade. The Newton-Pippin was also more lethal as it did not penetrate into the ground as far before detonating, increasing the effect of its shrapnel, and was top-heavy increasing the likelihood of it landing head first and activating the detonator. The Newton Pippin was simpler and had only one moving part in its fuse. Despite this production was lower than the Hale's grenade, of which 10 million were used during the war.

Hale developed refinements to his rifle grenade design throughout the war. The original (the No. 3) was replaced by the No. 20 in March 1916 and that by the No. 24 in 1917 and that by the No. 35 in early 1918. Each successive model was simpler, safer and more reliable than its predecessor. They were also quicker and easier to manufacture and consumed less brass and steel.

== Other explosives ==
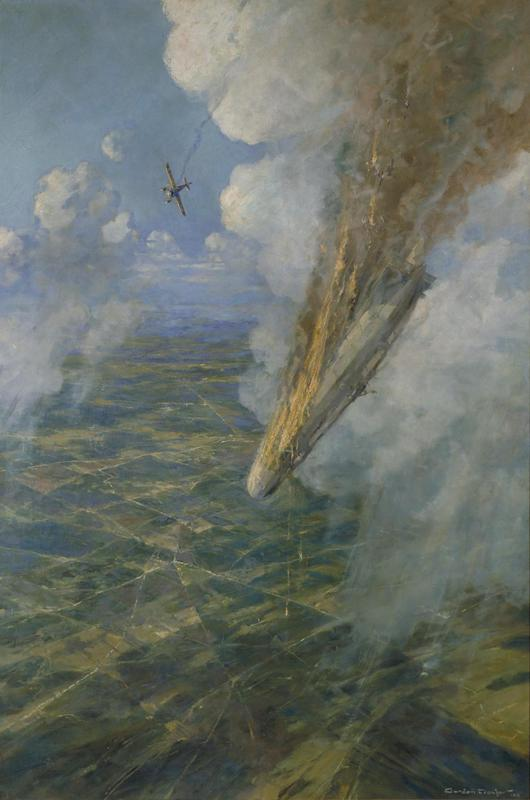
Destruction of LZ 37 by Hale bomb

In 1913 Hale invented the Hale aircraft bomb. It was the only aerial bomb available to British forces at the start of the First World War. In October 1914 Hale bombs were used in a raid on an airship base in Düsseldorf, Germany. Flight Lieutenant Reginald Marix hit a shed and destroyed Zeppelin LZ 25, the first time a Zeppelin had been destroyed whilst still in its hangar. On 7 June 1915 a Hale bomb was used by Flight Sub-Lieutenant Reginald Warneford to destroy Zeppelin LZ 37 over Ghent, Belgium, the first time a Zeppelin had been brought down by an aircraft. Hale sent a silver replica of a 20 lb (9 kg) Hale aircraft bomb to the Air Department to commemorate the event. A Hale bomb was also used in the first sinking of a U-boat by an aircraft and hundreds of thousands were dropped during the war. Hale also developed the first depth charge for use by the Royal Navy to attack U-boats in November 1914.

== Later life ==
After the war Hale fought a legal action against the War Office for infringement of his patents for rifle grenades. The action was launched on 3 May 1921 and was settled in Hale's favour in the Court of Appeal on 16 May 1925. Hale died on 2 February 1931 at Torquay in Devon.
