= Westley, Suffolk =

Village in Suffolk, England

Coordinates: 52.249°N 0.671°E

Westley
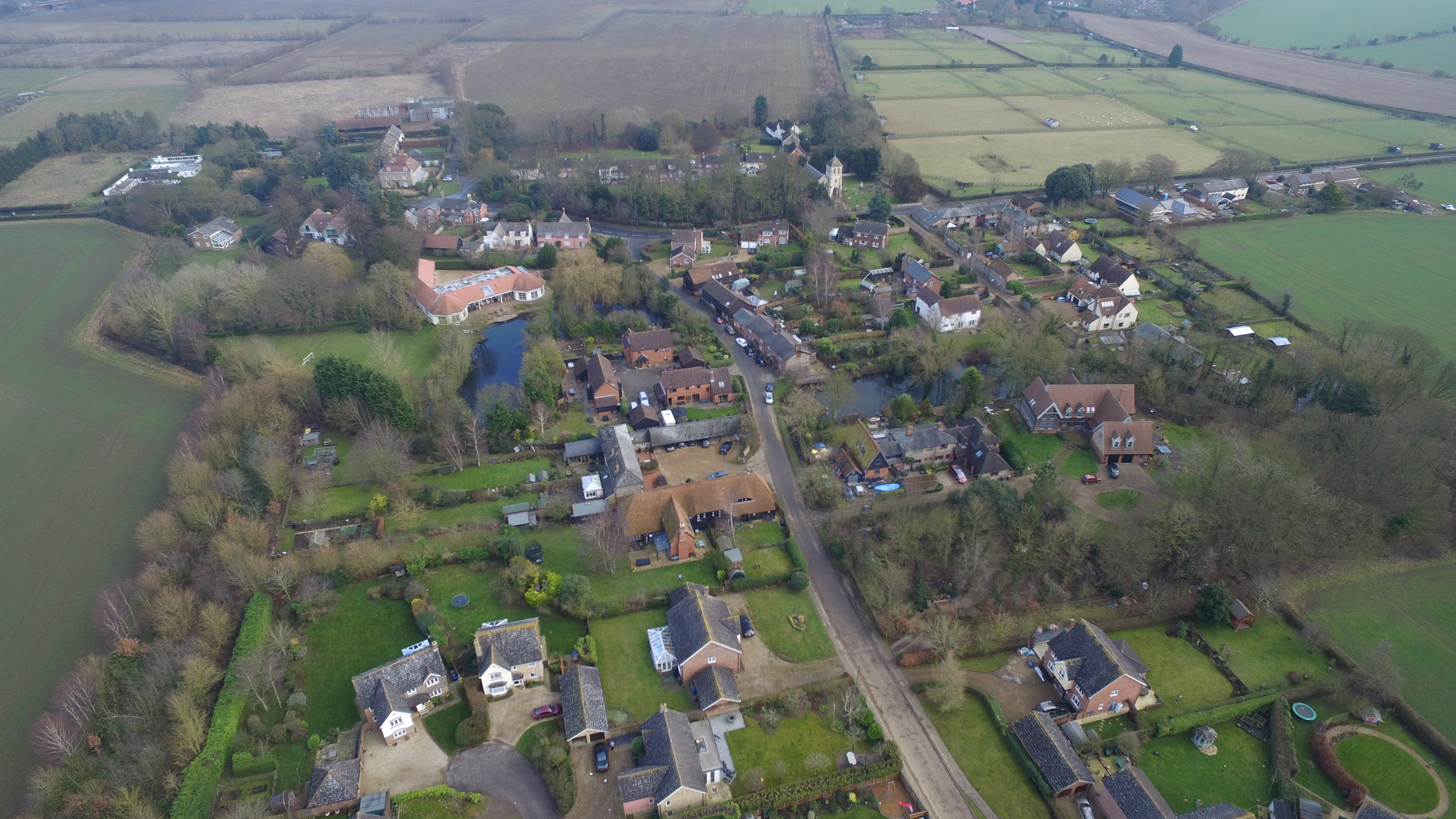

- Location within Suffolk
- Population: 183 (2011)
- OS grid reference: TL823646
- District: West Suffolk
- Shire county: Suffolk
- Region: East
- Country: England
- Sovereign state: United Kingdom
- Post town: Bury St Edmunds
- Postcode district: IP33
- Dialling code: 01284
- Police: Suffolk
- Fire: Suffolk
- Ambulance: East of England
- UK Parliament: West Suffolk

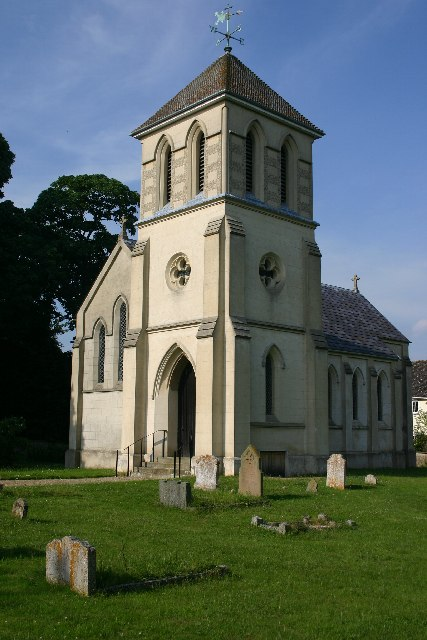
St Mary's Church, Westley

Westley is a village and civil parish in the West Suffolk district of Suffolk in eastern England. It is located south of Junction 42 of the A14 providing primary access to adjacent market towns Bury St Edmunds (East) and Newmarket (West). The village consists of two central roads: Fornham Lane and Hill Road running north and south through the parish, with adjoining roads accommodating Westley's total population of 183.

Village facilities include: Westley Club, located on Old church Lane and refurbished in 2012 to include pool tables and a community staffed bar, it is the village's only social venue. St Mary's Church, a pioneering concrete structure which features a three-phase tower with (nowadays) a slated pyramidal roof acts as the village's focal point.

== History ==
=== Early history ===
The earliest indication of the village's existence derives from 'a document of around 1040'. Westley later appeared in the 1086 Domesday Book under the name 'Westlea' meaning 'westerly wood or clearing'. Domesday Book recorded the village as having 21 households and a total tax assessment of 3.3 geld units suggesting that the area was of average affluence. 'St Thomas the Martyr Church' was the village's first church, constructed in the 12th century after St Thomas of Canterbury. Its site is on the Western limit of the modern village, and is maintained as a quiet place for contemplation. The church suffered severe storms in 1844 and 1789, despite attempts by churchwardens to repair the building in the early 19th century, pillage of the stonework and the conclusion that the structure is beyond repair led to its closure in 1834.

The closure of St Thomas church led to the construction of St Mary's Church in 1835, noted as 'one of the earliest concrete buildings to have been built in England.' The construction of the church was funded by public subscription on land given by Frederick Hervey, 1st Marquess of Bristol and incorporated innovative architectural techniques implemented by Brighton builder 'William Ranger'. Notable aesthetic features of St Mary's Church include the slate roof and patented precast concrete blocks used to form the tower and churchyard walls.

In 1870–72, [John Marius Wilson] described Westley as:

"Westley, a parish in Thingoe district, Suffolk; 2 miles W by S of Bury-St. Edmunds r. station. Post town, Bury-St. Edmunds. Acres 1,216. Real property, £1,553. Pop., 140. Houses, 29. The manor belongs to the executors of J. Lee, Esq. The living is a rectory, annexed to Fornham. The church was built in 1836"

=== 20th century ===
Westley was bombed by a Zeppelin airship during the First World War, the village formed part of LZ 37 Zeppelin's flight path from Great Yarmouth on the night of 29 April 1915; there were no fatalities. Westley airfield was built in 1938. Consisting of two hangars and a relatively short runway, it predominantly flew Westland Lysanders. Similar to much of Westley's periphery, the airfield now forms part of a housing estate to accommodate Bury St Edmunds's growth. The shrinking of the area of the parish is credited to the loss of the three manors: Sexton Manor; which has now formed part of Bury St Edmunds, Pembroke (Dunham Hall) and Luce's (Leo's) Hall.

In 1959 St Mary Church's buttressed spire was damaged by detrimental weather conditions, and was replaced by the current pyramidal roof on the church tower.

=== Manors ===
Westley had three manors. Sextons Manor which is now part of Bury St Edmunds. Pembroke (or Dunham Hall) which is thought to have stood near what is now Parson's Barn and Luce's (or Leo's) Hall was situated where Westley Hall now stands. In the reign of Henry VII of England Pembroke Manor was held by the King's uncle Jasper Tudor. Thomas Lucas (Solicitor General to Henry VII) (Solicitor General for England and Wales) held Luces Hall in the village. It maybe that the spelling has over time been corrupted and was in fact Lucas Hall. Jasper Tudor (Earl of Pembroke) bequeathed Pembroke Hall to his longtime friend Thomas Lucas. The Lucas Family therefore owned two of the three Westley Manors. Thomas Lucas increased his local land holding by purchasing properties at nearby Little Saxham (where he built a fine Manor House) and Horsecroft.

== Demographics ==
=== Population ===
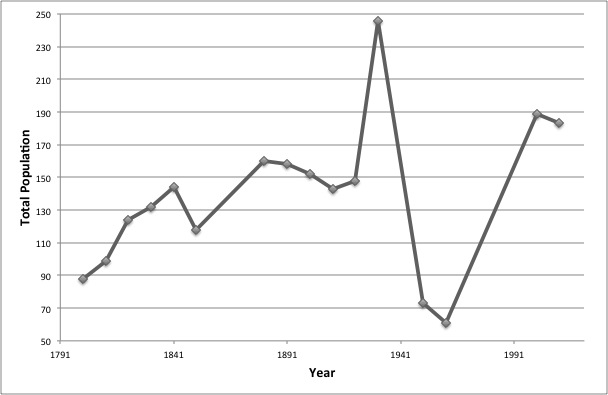
Total population of Westley, as reported by the Census of Population from 1881 to 2011

The earliest record of Westley's population appeared in the 1068 Domesday Book, the population is recorded as 21 households(population was measured by heads of families because The Domesday Book was written predominantly for the assessment of tax) assuming average family size is 4 the total population in 1068 was approximately 84 which is relatively large compared to neighbouring settlements. The earliest record of Westley's population in the national census is 1801, with a total population of 88. The population grew by an average of 14 persons every 10 years between 1811 and 1841. There are two significant population decreases on the adjacent time series: 1841–1851; which correlates to a reduction of 3 houses in the village during such years, and 1931 – 1951; which can be interpreted by a boundary change of 1240 to 685 acres between those years with much of the population being absorbed into Bury St Edmunds. The 2001 census recorded a total population of 189 and in 2011 the census recorded a small drop to 183, giving Westley a population density of 0.5 persons per hectare, this is 8 times less than the average population density of England suggesting that Westley is a sparse settlement in comparison.

=== Employment ===
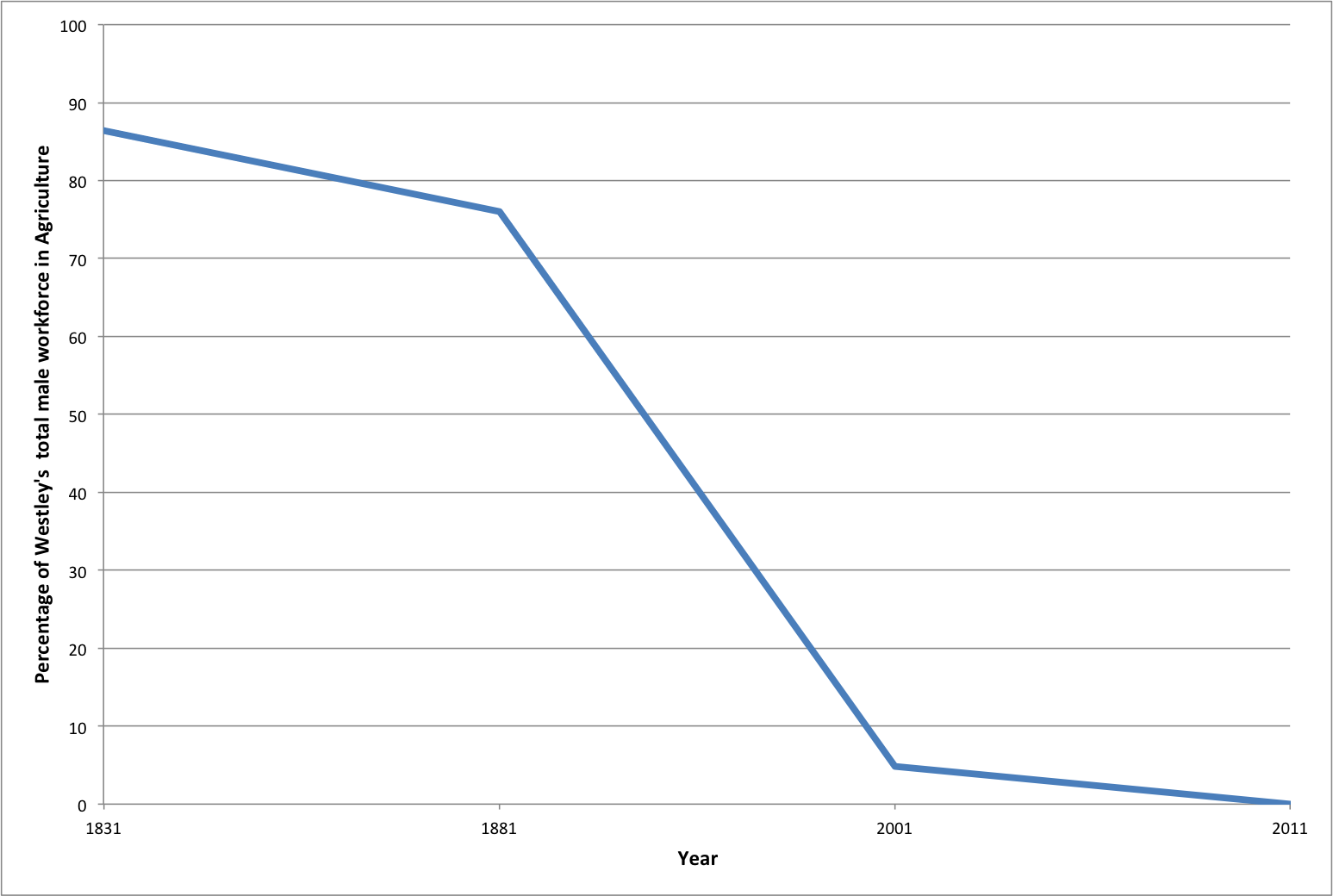
Percentage of males working in agriculture time series, as reported by the 1831, 1881 occupational data and the 2001, 2011 census.

Historical statistics from the 1881 occupational data demonstrate the importance of agriculture in Westley during the 19th century. In 1881, 76% (32 out of 40) of Westley's total male workforce was in the Agriculture category compared to 0% (out of 46) in the 2011 census.

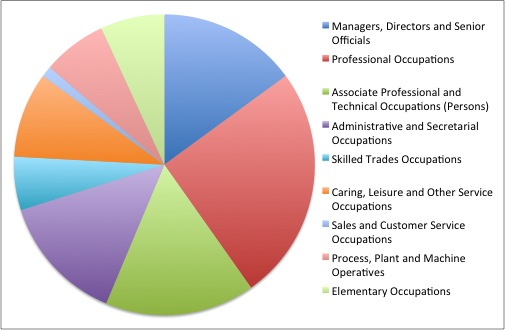
Westley Occupation Statistics, as reported by 2011 Census

According to the 2011 Census, there are 87 people aged 16–74 in employment in Westley, the most frequent occupational group is 'Professional Occupations' with a total of 22 persons(25.3%), this is reflective of the affluence of the area, demonstrated by the 'All households who owned their accommodation outright' figure which is double the national average.

== Transport ==
The village of Westley forms part of the Bury St Edmunds – Barrow – Newmarket 312 service operated by Mulleys. Westley's bus stops are positioned adjacent and opposite St Marys Church, Hill Road. Buses run every two hours Monday to Saturday with no Sunday service. Junction 42 of the A14, 0.6 miles (1 km) north of Westley links the village to larger settlements such as Bury St Edmunds (Eastbound) or Newmarket (Westbound). The conjoining roads Fornham Lane and Hill Road provide access through the centre of the village. Westley is served by Bury St Edmunds railway station, 2.4 miles (3.9 km) away. Services are operated by Greater Anglia and form part of the Peterborough – Ipswich and Cambridge – Ipswich Lines.
