= Samuel Joseph Mackie =

British geologist (1823–1902)

Samuel Joseph Mackie FGS, FSA (21 January 1823 – 31 May 1902), was a British geologist, inventor, and editor. He was a founding member of the Geologists' Association and the Anthropological Society of London, and sole editor of The Geologist: a Popular Monthly Magazine of Geology, a precursor to the Geological Magazine. He and his partners patented the Tonite (explosive). Born in Dover to Samuel and Eleanor Mackie, he married Maria Kemp on 4 December 1845, and after her death married Susan Arabella in October, 1853. He edited The Geologist from 1858 to 1864, at which point it was acquired by Lovell Reeve & Co. The next year he established the Geological and Natural History Repertory, which folded in 1869.

== Books ==
- A Handbook of Folkestone for Visitors (1856); 2nd edition (1859)
- First Traces of Life on the Earth: Or, The Fossils of the Bottom-rocks (1860)
- Art-studies From Nature, as Applied to Design (1872) with F. E. Hulme, J. Glaisher, and Robert Hunt
