= LZ 37 =

1915 Zeppelin M-class airship

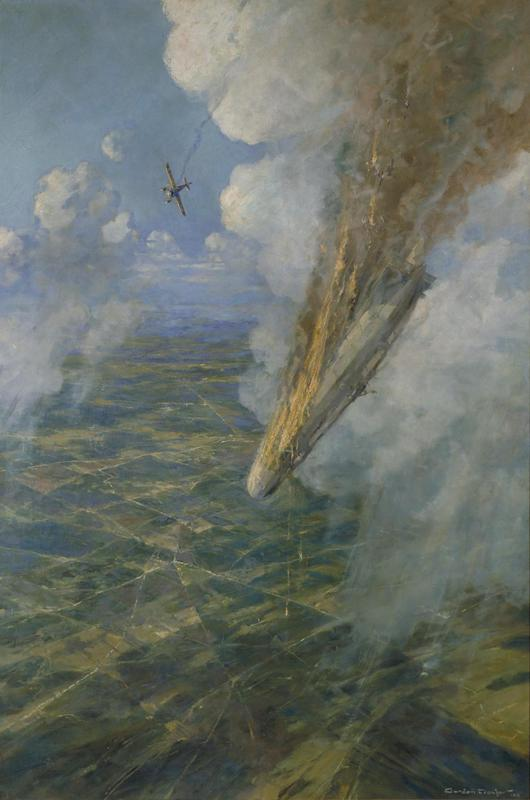
- Artist's impression of the destruction of German Zeppelin LZ 37 by Sub-Lieutenant Reginald Warneford on 7 June 1915.

General information
- Type: M-Class Zeppelin
- National origin: German Empire
- Manufacturer: Luftschiffbau Zeppelin at Friedrichshafen
- Owners: Imperial German Navy
- Number built: 77
- Construction number: LZ 37
- Flights: 14

History
- First flight: 4 March 1915
- In service: 4 March 1915 – 7 June 1915
- Fate: Shot down, 7 June 1915

The airship LZ 37 was a World War I Zeppelin of the German Kaiserliche Marine (Imperial Navy). It was the first Zeppelin to be brought down during the war by an enemy plane, on the night of 6 to 7 June 1915, near Sint-Amandsberg, Belgium.

== History ==
In 1915 Zeppelins were first used by Germany for strategic bombing.

LZ 37 was part of a raid with Zeppelins LZ 38 and LZ 39. While returning, she was intercepted in the air by Reginald Warneford in his Morane Parasol during its first raid on Calais, on 7 June 1915. Warneford dropped six 20-pound (9 kg) Hales bombs on the zeppelin, which caught fire and crashed into the convent school of Sint-Amandsberg, next to Ghent, Belgium (51°3′43.2″N 3°44′54.7″E), killing two nuns. The commander of LZ 37, Oberleutnant Otto van der Haegen, and seven members of the crew were killed. One crew member, Steuermann Alfred Mühler, survived with only superficial burns and bruises when he was precipitated from the forward gondola, landing in a bed. It was the first victory of a heavier-than-air aircraft over a lighter-than-air dirigible. Warneford was awarded the Victoria Cross for his achievement.

LZ 37 was based in Gontrode, Belgium (airport location: 50°58′54.6″N 3°47′17.1″E), where also other heavy bombers Gotha G IV were based.

== Specifications ==
Data from "The Zeppelin Airships - Part Two: Zeppelins of the Great War 1914–1918". Puget sound airship society.

General characteristics

- Crew: 28
- Length: 163.37 m (536 ft 0 in)
- Diameter: 18.7 m (61 ft 4 in)
- Volume: 33,780 m^{3} (1,126,000 cu ft)
- Empty weight: 17,588 kg (38,775 lb)
- Useful lift: 8,520 kg (18,780 lb)
- Powerplant: 4 × Maybach MC-X , 155 kW (210 hp) each

Performance

- Maximum speed: 96 km/h (60 mph, 52 kn)

Armament

- Four machine-guns
