= Jam tin grenade =

Double cylinder Nos. 8 and 9
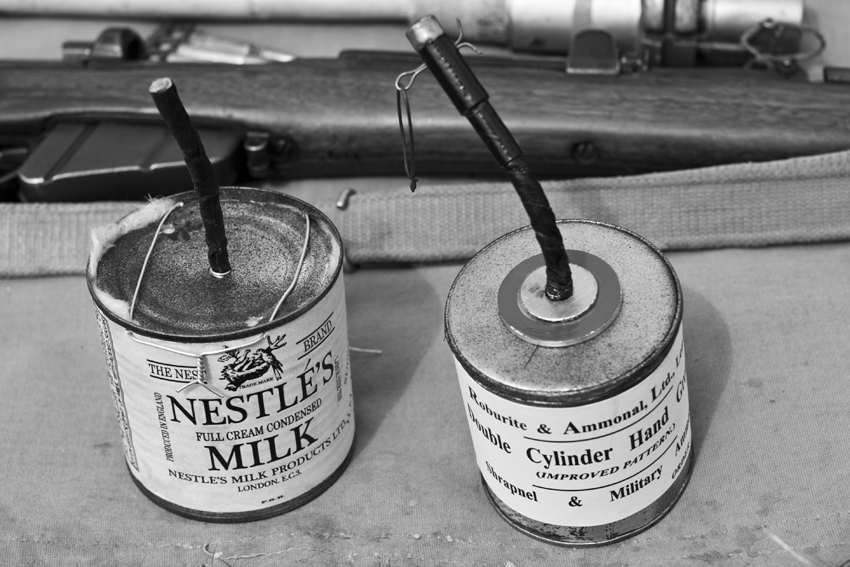
- Reproduction of a trench improvised explosive device in a milk tin, and a similar manufactured double cylinder grenade
- Type: Hand grenade
- Place of origin: British Empire

Service history
- In service: 1914–1915
- Used by: See § Users
- Wars: World War I

Production history
- Designer: Louis Jackson
- Manufacturer: Roburite & Ammonal Limited
- Variants: See § Variants

Specifications (Double cylinder No. 8)
- Mass: 1.5 lb (0.68 kg)
- Filling: Ammonal and shrapnel bullets
- Detonation mechanism: Timed friction fuse

The double cylinder, Nos. 8 and No. 9 hand grenades, also known as the "jam tins", are a type of improvised explosive device used by the British and Commonwealth forces, notably the Australian and New Zealand Army Corps (ANZAC) in World War I (1914–1918). The jam tin, or bully beef tin, was one of many grenades designed by ANZACs in the early part of the First World War in response to a lack of equipment suited to trench warfare.

== Background ==
In late 1914, once the Germans superiority in grenades and trench mortars became apparent, the British appointed Colonel Louis Jackson, Assistant Director of Fortifications and Works to develop British equivalents, including the Jam tin in collaboration with the Roburite & Ammonal Company.

While some accounts including James Dunn's The War Infantry Knew (1938) suggests that improvised Jam tins were used in France as early as December 1914, Jackson's own account claimed that the No. 8 and No. 9 grenades were introduced first while the improvised versions appeared later. According to Saunders, the Bengal Sappers and Miners used their pre-war experience to build improvised grenades including the Jam tin grenade, which was later standardized for mass production as the Nos 8 and 9 until the Mills bomb could be produced in sufficient numbers for the troops.

== Design ==
The grenade was an inner can of explosive with an outer can of metal fragments or bearing balls. The heavier pattern No. 9 grenade contained more high explosive and more metal fragments. The fuse was ignited by a friction device or a cigarette.

The Official History gives the following 'recipe' for the grenade:

"Take a tin jam pot, fill it with shredded guncotton and tenpenny nails, mixed according to taste. Insert a No. 8 detonator and a short length of Bickford's fuse. Clay up the lid. Light with a match, pipe, cigar, or cigarette and throw for all you are worth."

The hairbrush grenade was a variant of the Jam tin grenade, which was basically a slab of guncotton wired to a piece of wood serving as a handle, but it was thrown the same way.

Initially when demand for grenades was at its greatest, engineers were encouraged to improvise their own grenades from the tins containing the soldier's ration of jam, hence the name. Incidents with the improvised form and the supply of superior grenades led to official withdrawal of the design.

According to the ANZACs, the best method of throwing a Jam tin grenade was for the throwers to lay on their backs. Due the shrapnel and fragments, the grenade could only be thrown behind cover while the effective throwing range was estimated at 25–35 yd (23–32 m).

Jam tin grenades were used as booby traps by ANZACs, by rigging it to a pressure trigger and leaving it under a body or other heavy object to keep it unarmed until it was disturbed.

== Variants ==
=== Official designs ===
- No. 8 Pattern − Also known as the light pattern, it was filled with ammonal and shrapnel bullets, with a total weight of 1.5 lb (680 g)
- No. 9 Pattern − Also known as the heavy pattern, it weighed 2 lb (910 g) and was intended to be hurled with the help of catapults or bomb throwers

=== Improvised designs ===
- Jam Tin Bomb (ANZAC) − A jam tin used during the Gallipoli Campaign, materials for the grenade body ranged from empty artillery fuze cases to tobacco tins
- Jam Tin Bomb (Canada) − A jam tin filled with two charges containing 2 oz (57 g) of guncotton each and scrap metal, a No. 8 detonator and a length of No. 9 safety fuse tied up with a piece of burlap cloth; Instructor Coleman also mentioned that a training grenade can be fashioned by using a single guncotton charge and replacing the scrap metal with rock-free dirt, while the detonator could be replaced with a burlap pouch filled with black powder and a length of Safety No. 9
- Jam Tin Grenade (Canada) − A jam tin filled with scrap metal and 1/2 lb (230 g) of dynamite or guncotton pressed inside a slightly larger tin
- Jam Tin Grenade (Home Guard) − A World War II design intended for the British Home Guard, it was a 1–2 lb (450–910 g) capacity tin filled with black powder or gelignite and scrap metal or rocks, fitted with a safety fuse and a detonator (black powder grenades only need a safety fuse); throwing range was estimated at 25–35 yd (23–32 m)

== History ==
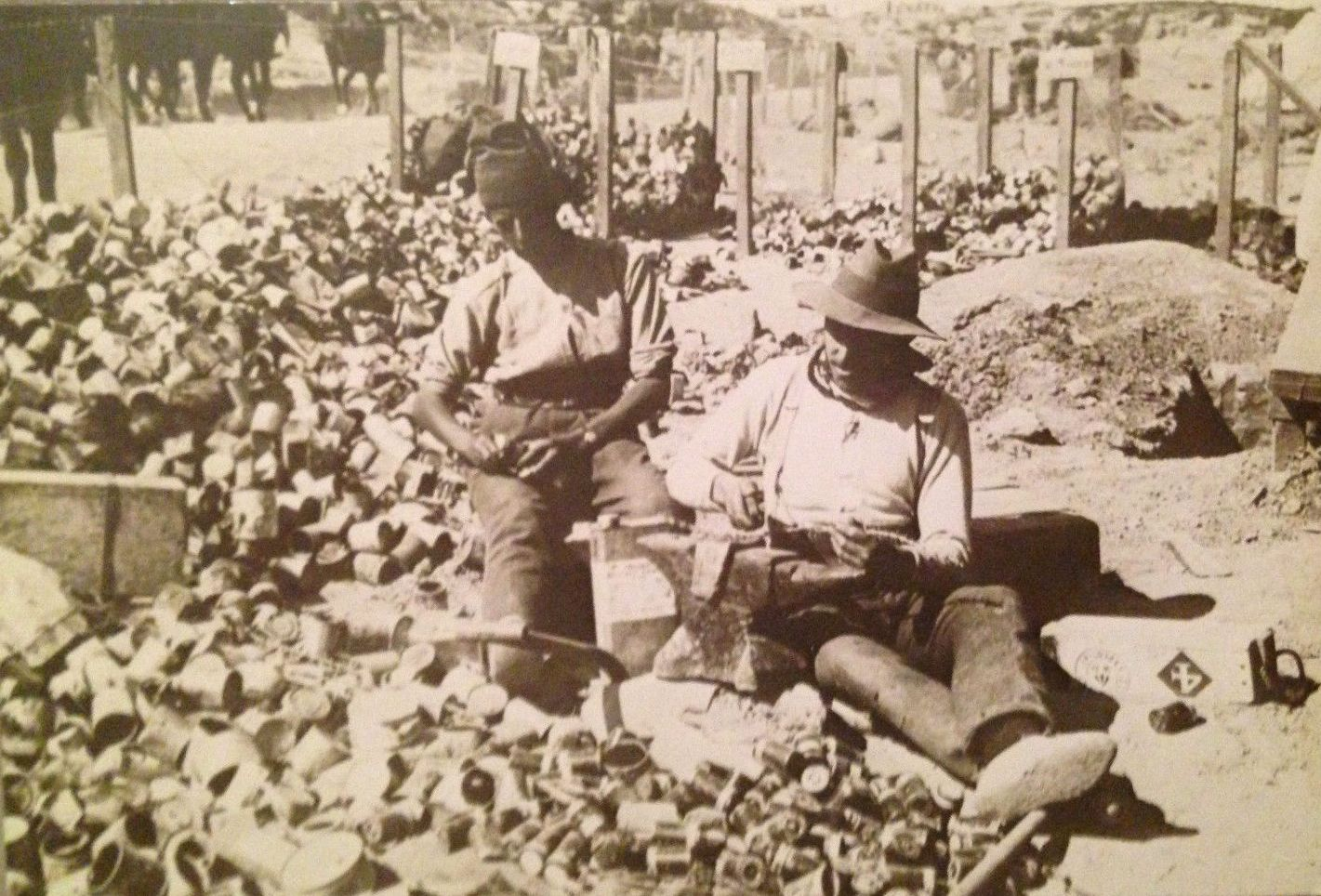
Two ANZACs surrounded by empty cans cutting scrap metal to fill in Jam tin grenades

The British, expecting a swift march towards Constantinople, did not initially provided the ANZACs with the supplies or equipment needed for trench warfare at the Gallipoli Campaign; while further supplies were eventually sent, bad weather and Turkish shelling forced the ANZACs to take stopgap measures, including setting up a grenade 'factory' at ANZAC Cove in May 1915 to produce Jam tin grenades. By June it was producing around 200 bombs a day, and on 7 August alone, 54 men produced hundreds of grenades for the Battle of Lone Pine. The Jam tin grenade was always in short supply however, and during the fighting against the Turks they were constantly at risk of being bombed out of their trenches, sometimes being forced to throw Turkish grenades back before they detonated or make use of other types of improvised grenades.

During the Siege of Kut in Mesopotamia (December 1915–April 1916), the Royal Engineers in General Townshend's force improvised jam pot mortar shells to be used with improvised mortars devised from the cylinders of a Gnome 80 hp (60 kW) rotary engine (credit to Capt. R.E. Stace, RE). The engine came from a Martinsyde S.1 scout plane, likely damaged or otherwise unable to evacuate.

Improvised explosive devices of this type were also used to a limited extent during World War II (1939–1945): SOE and OSS agents, before being parachuted behind enemy lines, were trained to construct various types of improvised ordnances, including tin can grenades; instructions regarding the construction of "Jam-tin Grenades" were also included in the training for the British Home Guard.

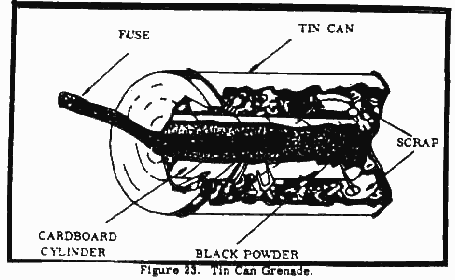
Tin Can Grenade

An improvised explosive device designated "Tin Can Grenade" remained in the arsenal of the United States Army Special Forces at least until the 1960s.

== Users ==
- Australia
- British Raj
- Canada
- New Zealand
- United Kingdom
