= Reginald Warneford =

Airman who was a recipient of the Victoria Cross

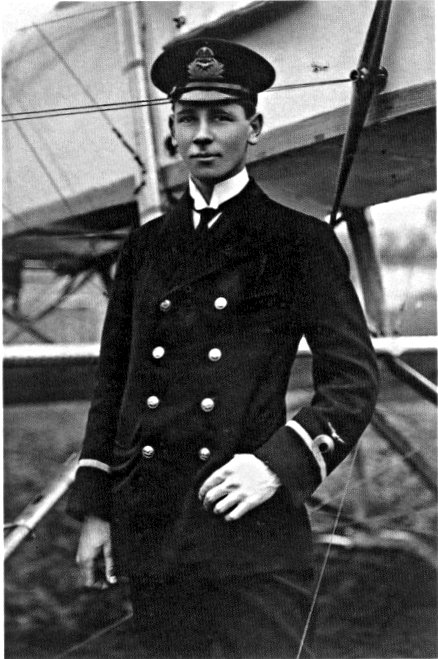
- Warneford standing in front of a Maurice Farman Shorthorn
- Born: 15 October 1891; Darjeeling, British Raj
- Died: 17 June 1915 (aged 23); Buc, Yvelines, France
- Burial place: Brompton Cemetery, London
- Military career
- Allegiance: United Kingdom
- Branch: Royal Navy
- Service years: 1914–1915
- Rank: Sub-Lieutenant
- Units: No. 1 Squadron RNAS
- Conflicts: First World War
- Awards: Victoria Cross; Legion of Honour (France)

Reginald Alexander John Warneford, VC (15 October 1891 – 17 June 1915), also known as Rex Warneford, was a British aviator and Royal Naval Air Service officer who received the Victoria Cross for air-bombing a Zeppelin during the First World War. It was the first victory of a heavier-than-air aircraft over a lighter-than-air dirigible.

== Early life ==
Warneford was born in Darjeeling, India, the son of an engineer on the Indian Railways. He was brought to England as a small boy and educated at King Edward VI School, Stratford-upon-Avon but after his family returned to India he continued his education at the English College, Simla. Following apprenticeship in the Merchant Marine, Warneford joined the British-India Steam Navigation Company.

At the outbreak of the First World War, he was in Canada awaiting return to India. Instead, he sailed to Britain and joined the 24th (Service) Battalion (2nd Sportsman's), Royal Fusiliers (City of London Regiment), but soon transferred to the Royal Naval Air Service for pilot training.

== Service ==
Warneford's initial training took place at Hendon, passing then to Upavon in Wiltshire where he completed his pilot training on 25 February 1915. During the course of training, the Commander of Naval Air Stations, R. M. Groves was quoted as saying: "This youngster will either do big things or kill himself." Warneford's flying instructor at the time, Warren Merriam, noted his skills as a pilot but had to make special arrangements to ensure that Warneford's perceived over-confidence did not bar him from attaining a commission. Merriam took an opportunity whilst Commander Groves was visiting Hendon to ask Warneford to demonstrate his flying skills. Groves' favourable impression overcame the views of the Squadron Commander at the time who believed that Warneford would never make an officer because of his lack of discipline.

Warneford was initially posted to 2 Wing on the Isle of Sheppey in Kent but was quickly (7 May 1915) posted to an operational unit with 1 Wing at Veurne on the Belgian coast. Over the next few weeks, Warneford was involved in attacks on German troops and guns, as well as actions against enemy aircraft. His aggressiveness and effectiveness led to his being given his own aircraft and a roving commission. On 17 May 1915, Warneford encountered a Deutsches Heer-flown Zeppelin airship, LZ 39, setting out on a raid over the UK. He attacked LZ 39 with machine gun fire but the airship was able to ascend out of range by jettisoning ballast.

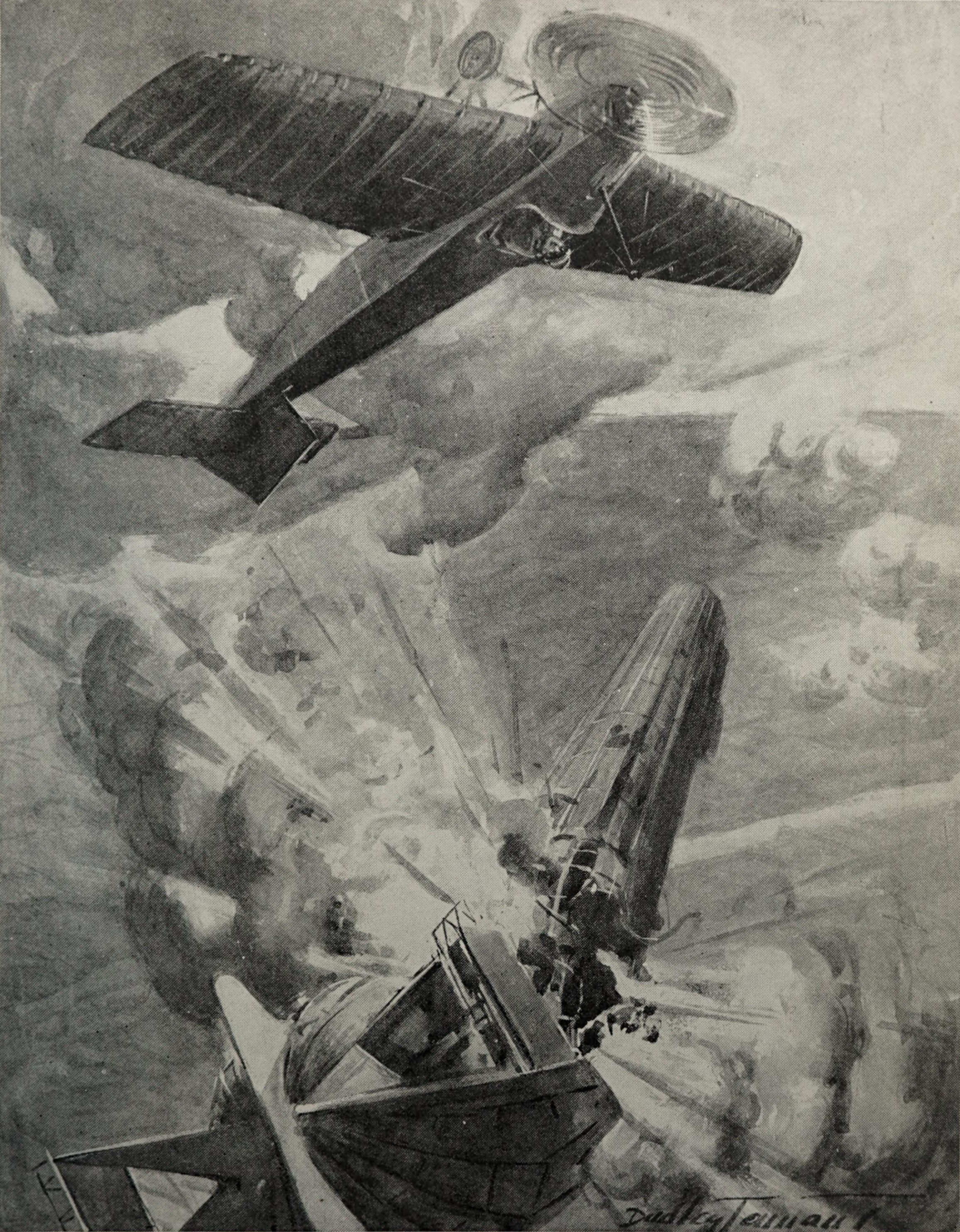
A drawing of the downing of LZ 37 by Rex Warneford

On 7 June 1915 at Ghent, Belgium, Warneford, flying a Morane-Saulnier Type L, attacked another German Army airship, LZ 37. He chased the airship from the coast near Ostend and, despite its defensive machine-gun fire, succeeded in dropping his six 20-pound (9 kg) Hale bombs on it, the last of which set the airship on fire. LZ 37 subsequently crashed into a convent school in Sint-Amandsberg (51°3′43.2″N 3°44′54.7″E), Ghent, killing two nuns, the commander of LZ 37, Oberleutnant Otto van der Haegen, and seven members of the crew.

The explosion overturned Warneford's aircraft and stopped its engine, forcing Warneford to land behind enemy lines. After 35 minutes spent on repairs he managed to restart the engine just as the Germans realised what was going on, and after yelling "Give my regards to the Kaiser!", he was able to take off and returned to base.

On 17 June 1915, Warneford received the award of Légion d'honneur from the French Army Commander in Chief, General Joffre. Following a celebratory lunch, Warneford travelled to the aerodrome at Buc in order to ferry an aircraft for delivery to the RNAS at Veurne. Having made one short test flight, he then flew a second flight, carrying an American journalist, Henry Beach Needham, as passenger. During a climb to 200 feet, the right-hand wings collapsed, leading to a catastrophic failure of the airframe. Accounts suggest that neither occupant was harnessed, and both were thrown out of the aircraft, suffering fatal injuries. For Needham, death was instantaneous. Warneford died of his injuries on the way to hospital. He was buried at Brompton Cemetery, London on 21 June 1915 in a ceremony attended by thousands of mourners. The grave lies in front of the eastern colonnade.

His Victoria Cross is displayed at the Fleet Air Arm Museum in Yeovil, Somerset, England. A street in Ghent was named Reginald Warnefordstraat on the spot where the airship crashed. In 2016 a road was named in his memory, Warneford Crescent in Longhedge, Salisbury.

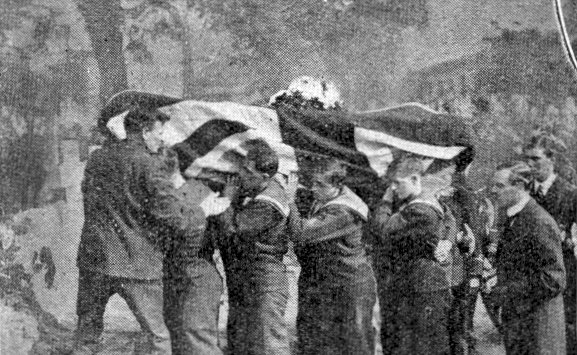
Reginald Warneford's funeral

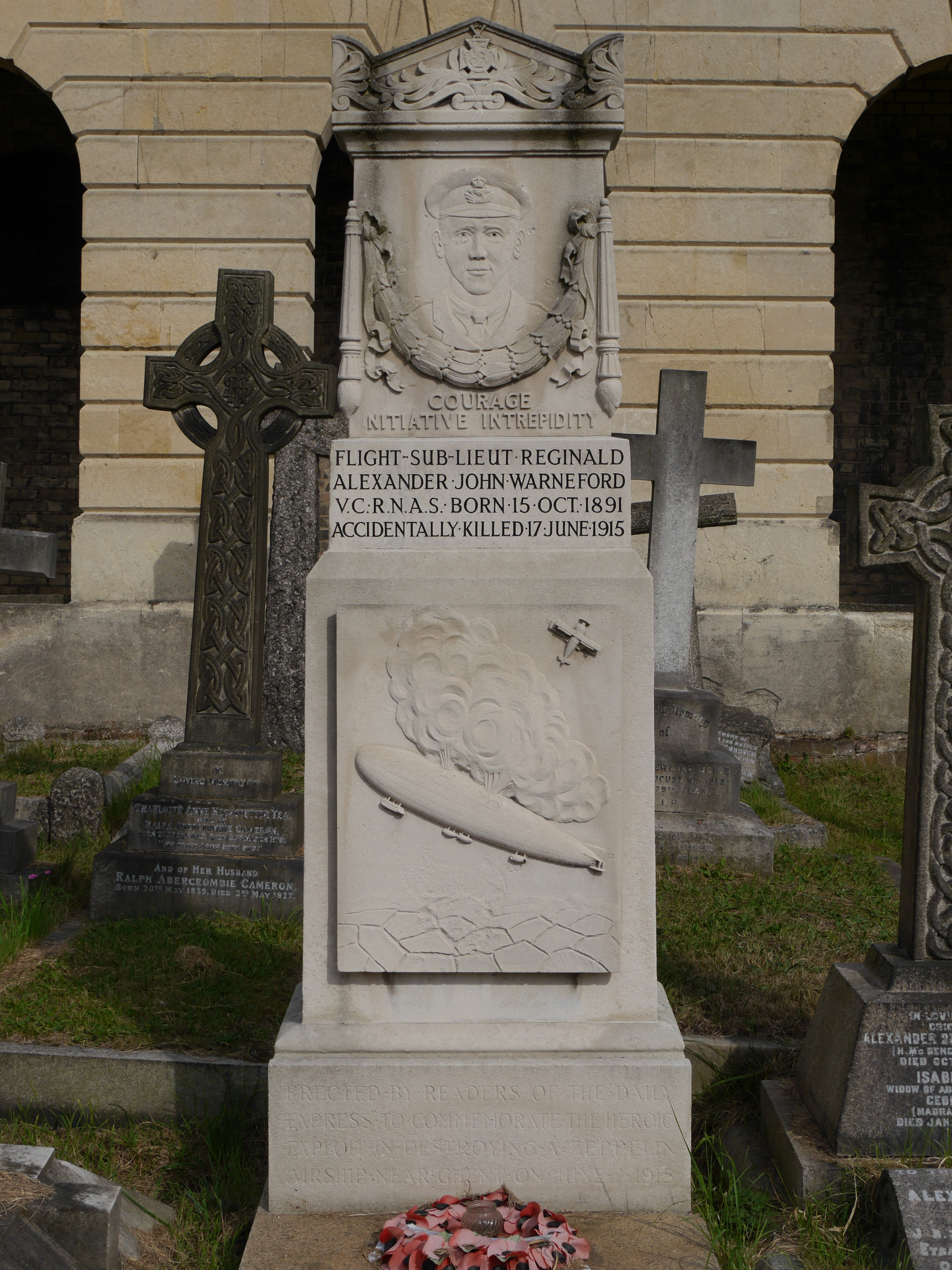
Funerary monument, Brompton Cemetery, London

== Legacy ==
Wareneford was commemorated in music by Howard Ellis Carr in the final movement of his Three Heroes suite, which includes a musical depiction of a Zeppelin air raid. The suite became popular after the war, and was performed quite regularly, including at Hastings in 1921 and at The Proms in 1918, 1920 and 1924.

In 1921, a house at his school, King Edward VI School, Stratford-upon-Avon, was named after him. However, just three years later the houses were changed to commemorate the two benefactors of the school; Guild and King's. In 2000, the houses were changed once again and Warneford was represented by the colour green once again.

Flt Sub Lt Warneford is commemorated in the naming of Warneford Place, a small cul-de-sac in Oxhey Village, near Watford. Through his life, Warneford is known to have made frequent stays at his aunt’s house in the village.

Tied to his association with Oxhey Village, Warneford's name can be found on memorial plaques located at St Matthew's Church.

== See also ==
- John Cyril Porte – Squadron Commander of Hendon Aerodrome August 1914 – September 1915
- Leefe Robinson – another VC recipient awarded for shooting down a German airship

== Bibliography ==
- Buzzell, Nora (1997). The Register of the Victoria Cross (3rd ed.). Cheltenham, Gloucestershire: This England Alma House. ISBN 0-906324-27-0.
- Cooksley, Peter G. (1999). VCs of the First World War: Air VCs. Stroud: Sutton Publishing Ltd. ISBN 0-7509-2272-9.
- Gibson, Mary. Warneford, VC: The First Naval Airmen to Be Awarded the VC. Fleet Air Arm Museum for the Society of Friends of the Fleet Air Arm Museum, 1979 (republished in 1984).
- Harvey, David. Monuments to Courage: Victoria Cross Headstones and Memorials. Vol.1, 1854–1916. Kevin & Kay Patience, 1999.
- Merriam, F. W. First Through the Clouds: The Autobiography of a Box-kite Pioneer. Batsford, 1954.
- O'Connor, Mike (2006). Airfields and Airmen : the Channel Coast. Barnsley: Pen & Sword Military. ISBN 1-84415-258-8.
- Rimell, Raymond Laurence (1989). The airship VC : the life of Captain William Leefe Robinson. Bourne End: Aston Publications Ltd. ISBN 0-946627-53-3.
- Turner, C.C. (1972). The Old Flying Days (Reprint ed.). New York: Arno Press. ISBN 0-405-03783-X.
