= Tonite (explosive) =

Type of explosive

Tonite is an explosive sometimes used in the late 19th and early 20th centuries. It consists of a mixture of equal weights of barium nitrate and guncotton. The explosive was patented in 1874 by Samuel Joseph Mackie, Camille Alphonse Faure, and George French. Its name was taken from the Latin verb tonat = "it thunders", and is pronounced "toe-nite", not "tonight".

The high gas pressures generated by the detonation of tonite resulted in it being used as a bursting charge in some hand grenades used early in World War I.

Nitrocellulose is an oxygen-negative low explosive, so its decomposition is incomplete combustion:$\ce{2C12H14O4(NO3)6 -> 18CO + 6CO2 + 14H2O + 12N}$

Because nitrocellulose was used in mining, carbon monoxide could build up and pose a danger to miners. To remedy that problem, nitrates (potassium nitrate, barium nitrate, ammonium nitrate, etc.) were added into the nitrocellulose to achieve a better oxygen balance.
