= Sint-Amandsberg =

Sub-municipality of the city of Ghent, Belgium

- Sub-municipality of Ghent
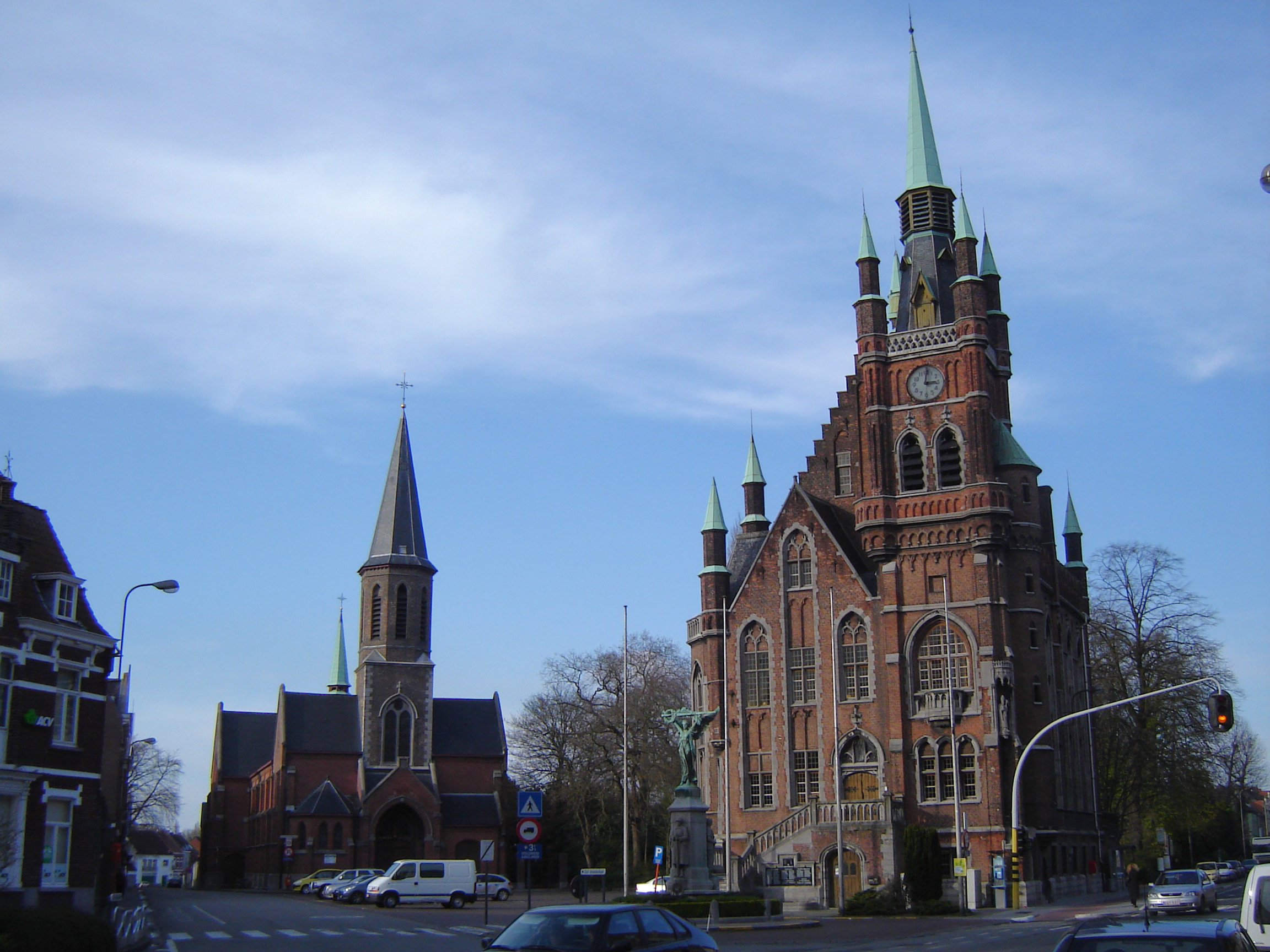
- Center of Sint-Amandsberg, with former town hall and church of Saint Amand

- Location of Sint-Amandsberg in Ghent
- Interactive map of Sint-Amandsberg
- Location within Belgium Location within East Flanders
- Coordinates: 51°03′14″N 3°44′57″E
- Country: Belgium
- Community: Flemish Community
- Region: Flemish Region
- Province: East Flanders
- Arrondissement: Ghent
- Municipality: Ghent

Area
  - Total: 5.99 km^{2} (2.31 sq mi)

Population (2020-01-01)
  - Total: 32,151
  - Density: 5,370/km^{2} (13,900/sq mi)
- Postal codes: 9040
- Area codes: 09

Sint-Amandsberg (Dutch pronunciation: [ˌsɪnt ɑˈmɑntsbɛr(ə)x]; French: Mont-Saint-Amand) is a sub-municipality of the city of Ghent located in the province of East Flanders, Flemish Region, Belgium. The municipality of Sint-Amandsberg was formed in 1872, when it was detached from the municipality of Oostakker. In 1876 and 1900, parts of the original municipality were already annexed to Ghent. On 1 January 1977, the municipality of Sint-Amandsberg was merged into Ghent.

It is served by the Bus and train station of Gent Dampoort on the Ghent Antwerp NMBS/SNCB line.

During the First World War, on 7 June 1915, the German airschip LZ37 crashed after being destroyed by Reginald Warneford. A street was named Reginald Warnefordstraat on the spot where the airship crashed.

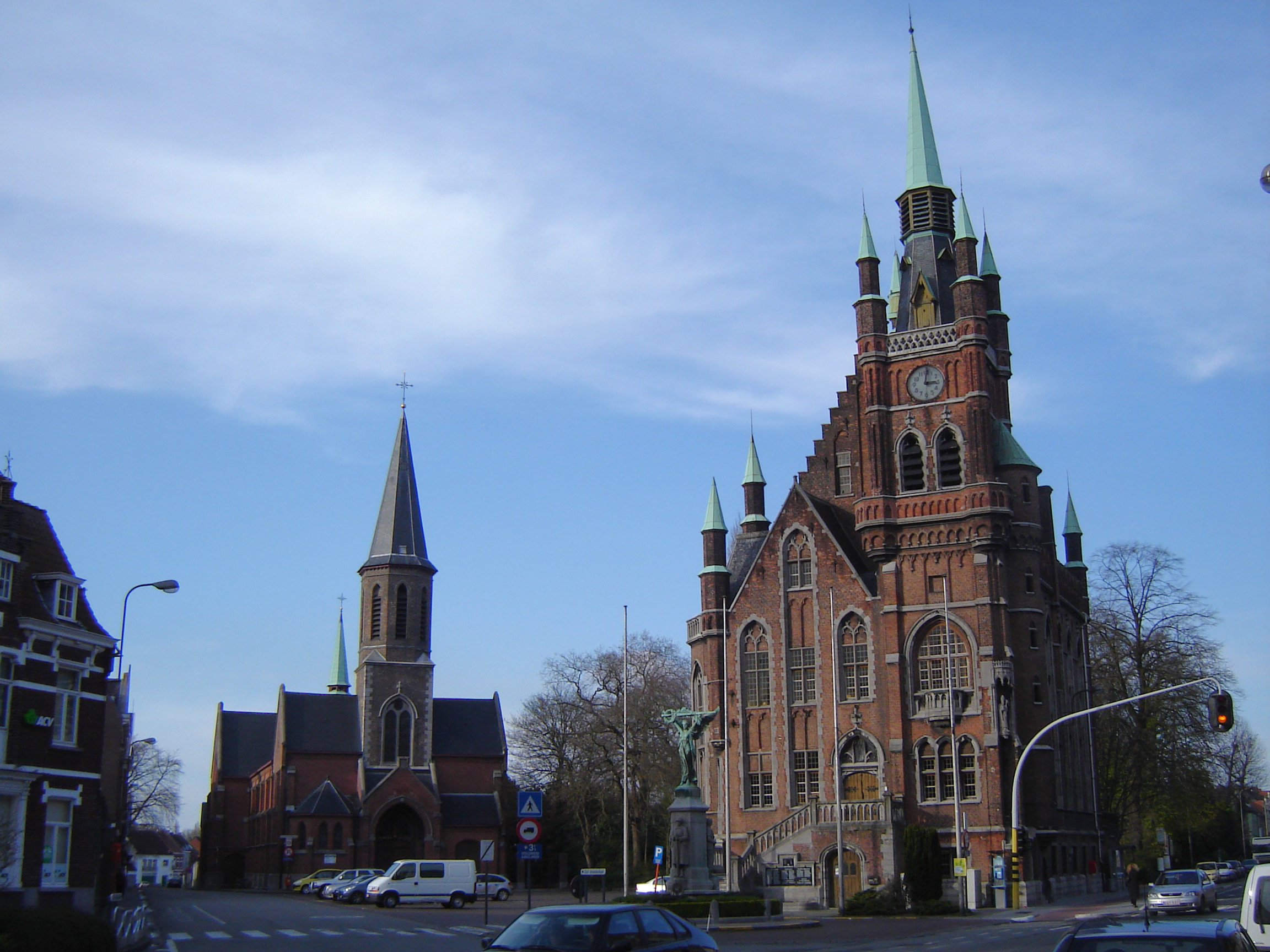
Centre of Sint-Amandsberg.

== Campo Santo ==
In the Center is the famous Campo Santo, a Catholic burial site. The chapel on the hill was erected by Philips Erard van der Noot.
