= Grenade =

Small explosive weapon that typically is thrown by hand

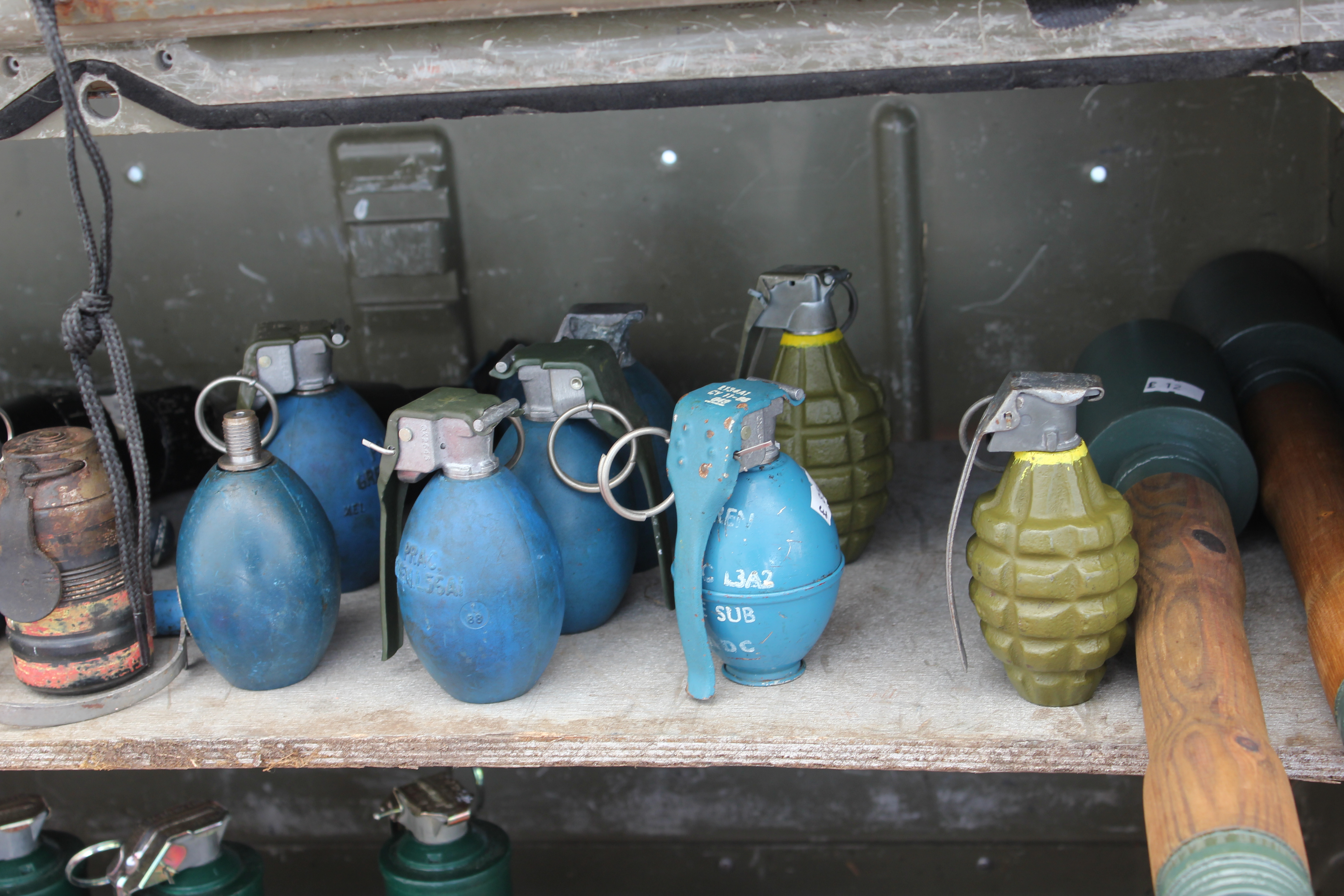
Replica hand grenades on display

US Army soldier throwing a dummy M67 grenade in training, 2022

A grenade is a small explosive projectile. It can be thrown by hand (hand grenade), launched by a rifle attachment, or launched by a dedicated launcher. A modern hand grenade generally consists of an explosive charge ("filler"), a detonator mechanism, an internal striker to trigger the detonator, and an arming safety secured by a transport safety. The user removes the transport safety pins before throwing, and once the grenade leaves the hand the arming safety gets released, allowing the striker to trigger a primer that ignites a fuze (sometimes called the delay element), which burns down to the detonator and explodes the main charge.

Grenades work by dispersing fragments (fragmentation grenades), shockwaves (high-explosive and stun grenades), chemical aerosols (smoke, gas and chemical grenades), fire (incendiary grenades), or a jet of metal (anti-tank grenades). Their outer casings, generally made of a hard synthetic material or steel, are designed to rupture and fragment on detonation, sending out numerous fragments (shards and splinters) as fast-flying projectiles. In modern grenades, a pre-formed fragmentation matrix inside the grenade is commonly used, which may be spherical, cuboid, wire, or notched wire. Most anti-personnel (AP) grenades are designed to detonate after a time delay and/or on impact.

Grenades are often spherical, cylindrical, ovoid, or truncated ovoid in shape, and of a size that fits the hand of an average-sized adult. Some grenades are mounted at the end of a handle and known as "stick grenades". The stick design provides leverage for throwing longer distances at the cost of additional weight and length, and has been considered obsolete by western countries since the Second World War and Cold War periods. A friction igniter inside the handle or on the top of the grenade head was used to initiate the fuse.

== Etymology ==
The origin of the English word grenade is disputed. Some derive it from the French word spelled exactly the same, meaning "pomegranate", while others claim it is taken more directly from the Latin granatus, meaning "filled with grain". The first use of the word for explosives comes from the August 1536 siege of Arles by the Emperor Charles V, while its first recorded use in English (as granades) dates from 1591.

== History ==
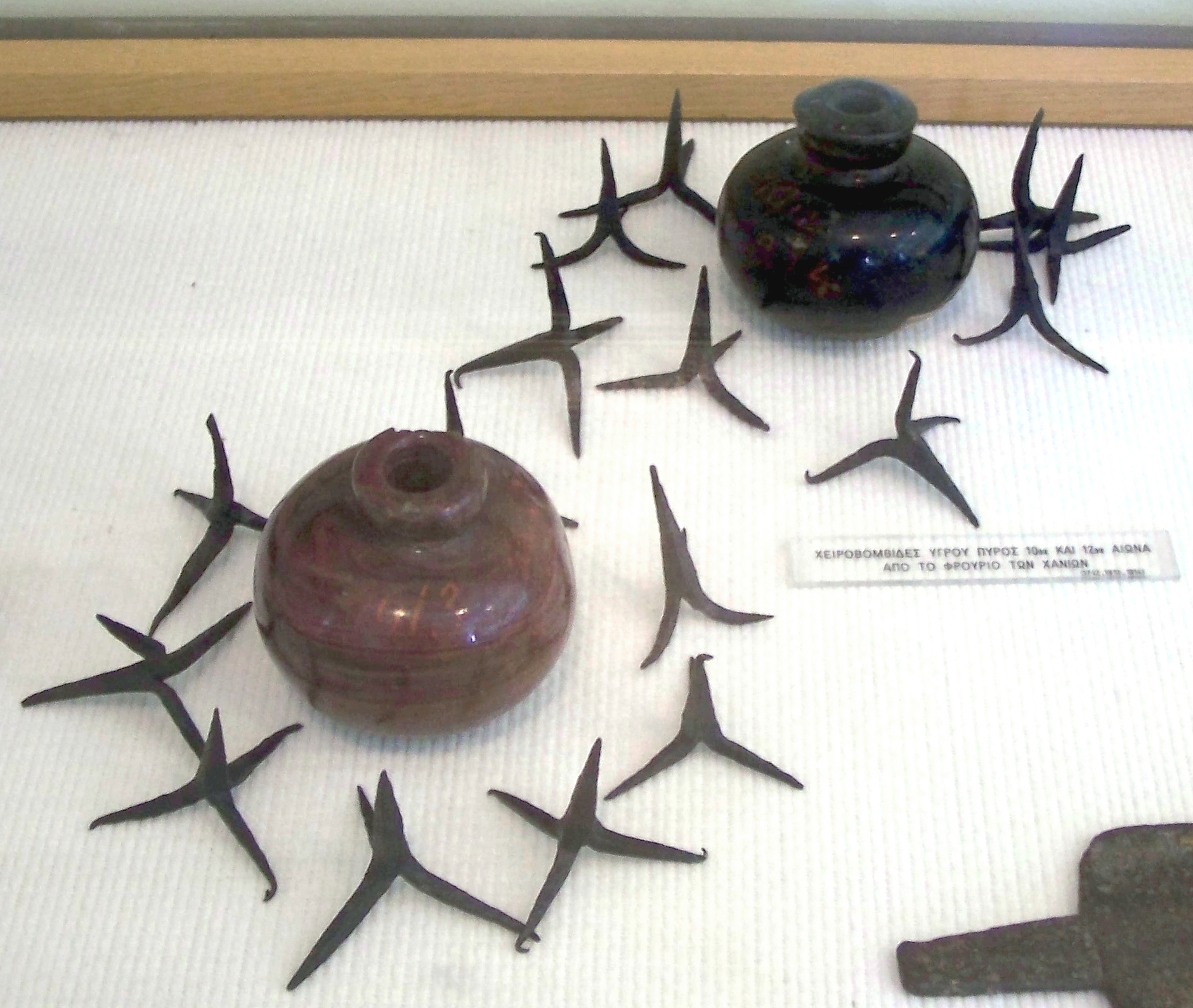
Hand grenades filled with Greek fire; surrounded by caltrops (10th–12th centuries National Historical Museum, Athens, Greece)

=== Pre-gunpowder ===
Mongolian grenade attack on Japanese during Yuan dynasty

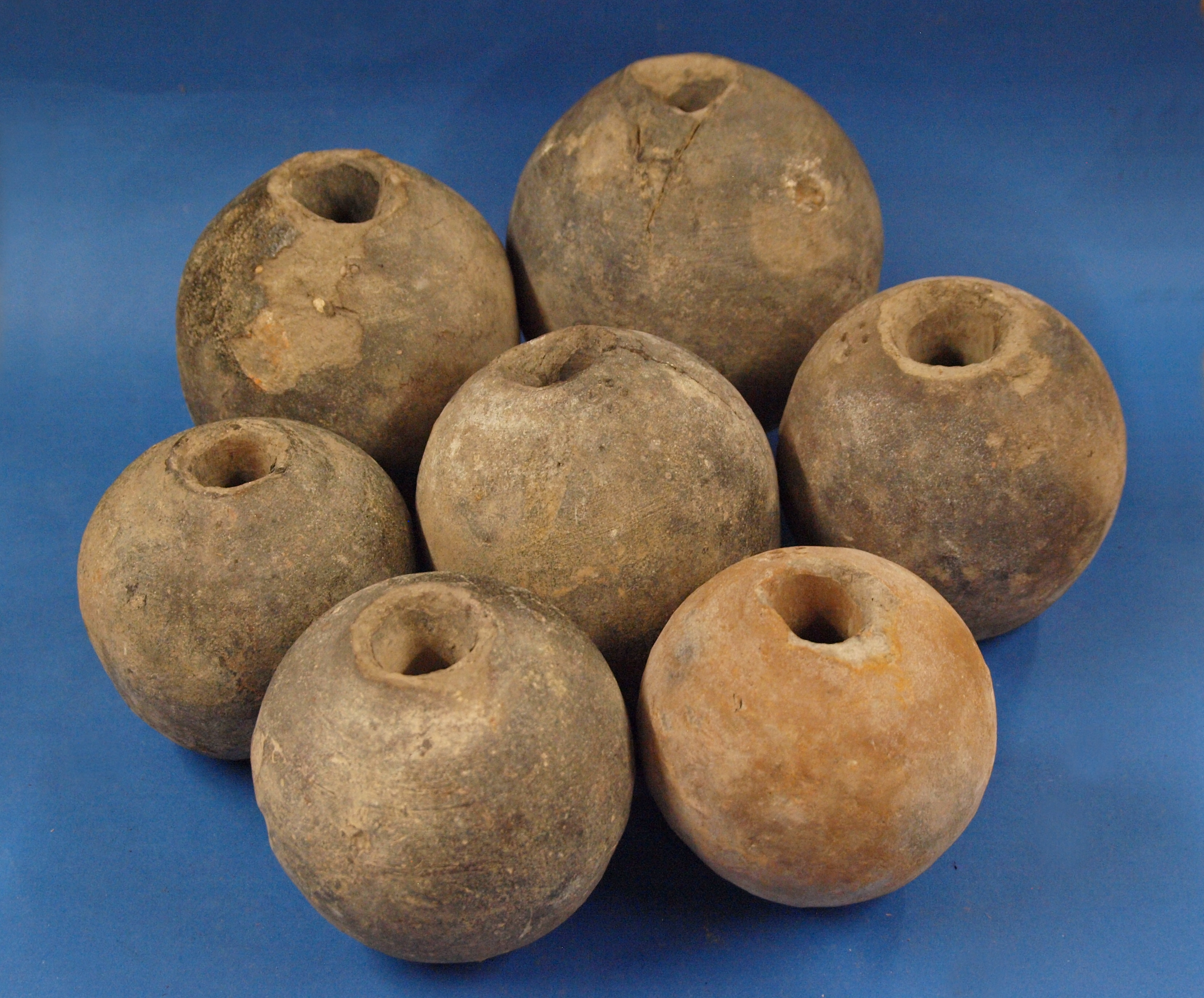
Seven ceramic hand grenades of the 17th century found in Ingolstadt, Germany

Rudimentary incendiary grenades appeared in the Byzantine Empire, not long after the reign of Leo III (717–741). The Byzantine army learned that Greek fire, a Byzantine invention of the previous century, could not only be thrown by flamethrowers at the enemy but also in stone and ceramic jars. Later, glass containers were employed.

=== Gunpowder ===
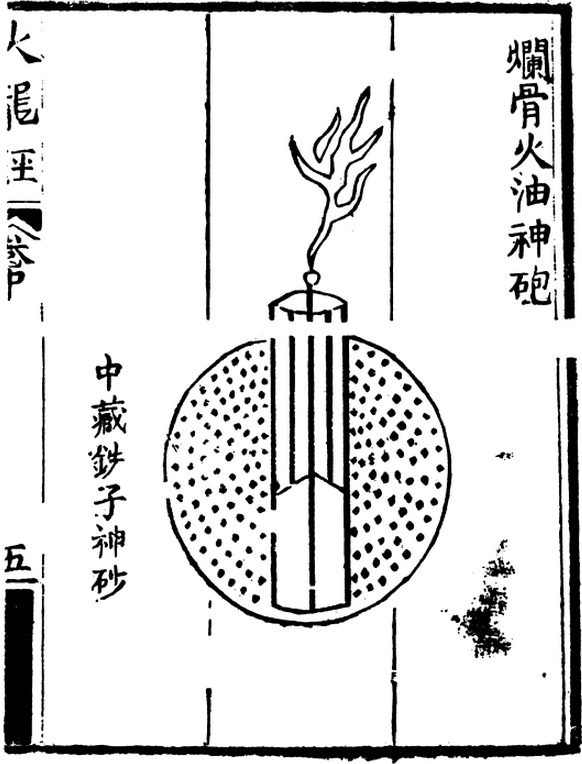
An illustration of a fragmentation bomb known as the 'divine bone dissolving fire oil bomb' (lan gu huo you shen pao) from the Huolongjing. The black dots represent iron pellets.

In Song China (960–1279), weapons known as 'thunder crash bombs' (震天雷) were created when soldiers packed gunpowder into ceramic or metal containers fitted with fuses. A 1044 military book, Wujing Zongyao (Compilation of Military Classics), described various gunpowder recipes in which one can find, according to Joseph Needham, the prototype of the modern hand grenade.

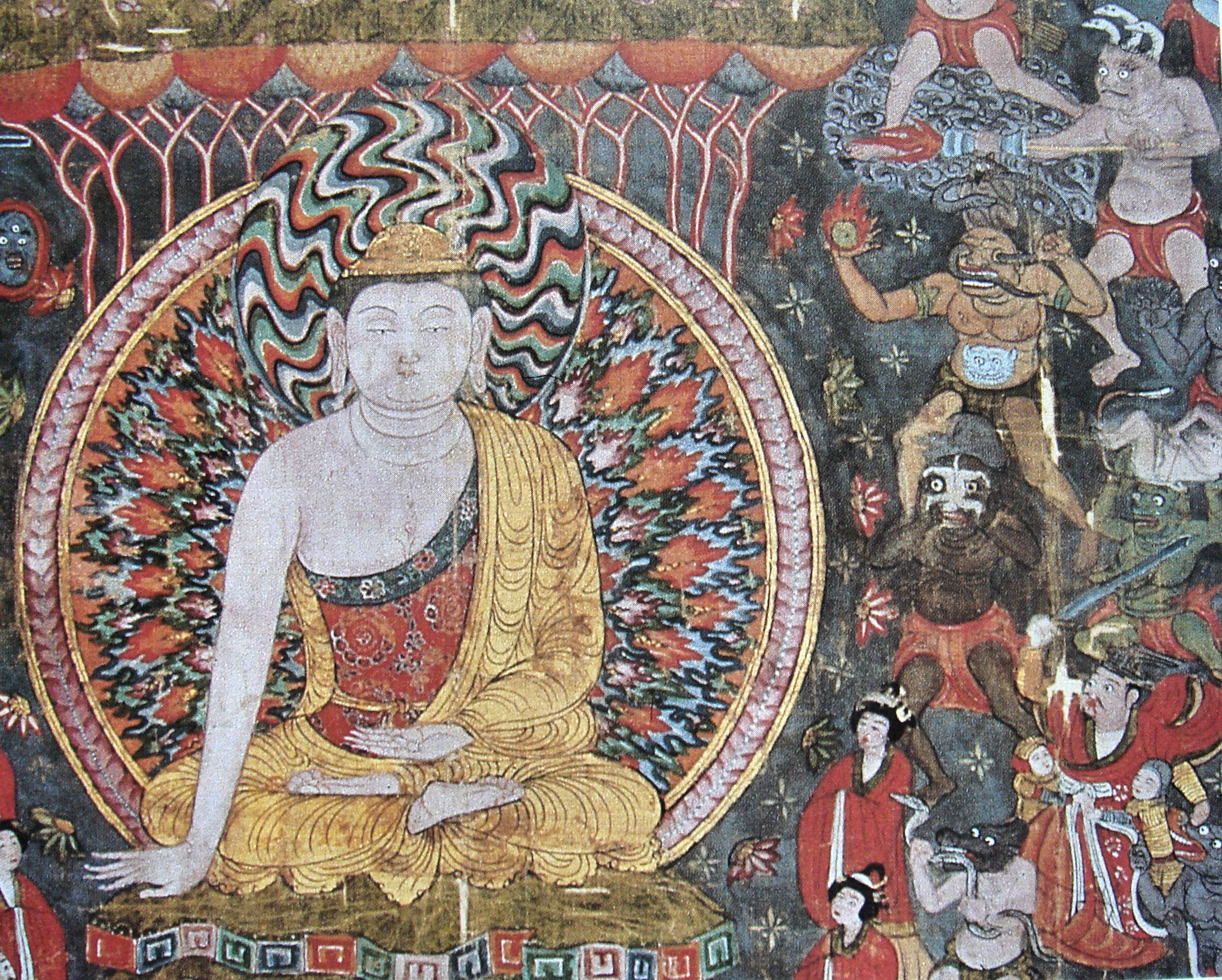
Earliest known representation of a gun (a fire lance) and a grenade (upper right), Dunhuang, 10th century AD

The shells (pào) are made of cast iron, as large as a bowl and shaped like a ball. Inside they contain half a pound of 'divine fire' (shén huǒ, gunpowder). They are sent flying towards the enemy camp from an eruptor (mu pào), and when they get there a sound like a thunder-clap is heard, and flashes of light appear. If ten of these shells are fired successfully into the enemy camp, the whole place will be set ablaze...

Grenade-like devices were also known in ancient India. In a 12th-century Persian historiography, the Mojmal al-Tawarikh, a terracotta elephant filled with explosives set with a fuse was placed hidden in the van and exploded as the invading army approached.

A type of grenade called the 'flying impact thunder crash bomb' (飛擊震天雷) was developed in the late 16th century and first used in September 1, 1592 by the Joseon Dynasty during the Japanese invasions of Korea. The grenade was 20 centimetres (7.9 in) in diameter, weighed 10 kilograms (22 lb), and had a cast iron shell. It contained iron pellets, and an adjustable fuse. The grenade was used with a dedicated grenade launcher called a 'wangu' (碗口). It was used in both the besieging and defense of fortifications, to great effect.

There is a documented precedent for the use of hand grenades by Catalan troops. At the very least, they were already utilized during the siege of Bonifacio in 1420. Another specific historical instance occurred in 1433: The fleet of Alfonso the Magnanimous (Alfons el Magnànim), which set sail for Sicily, loaded 200,000 units of primitive "magranes de coure" (copper pomegranates in the Italian language of the time) in Barcelona. The historical account describes them as follows:

"...It also carried 200,000 copper pomegranates filled with gunpowder, and when they set fire to them they made a great noise, and, as the pieces shattered, they did so much damage that they knocked to the ground anyone they touched..." — Melcior Miralles: Chronicle and Diary of the Chaplain of Alfonso the Magnanimous.

The key innovation here was the fragmentation effect. Older grenades relied mostly on fire to burn the enemy. The Catalan copper grenades were designed to explode and spray metal shrapnel, making them a true ancestor of the modern fragmentation grenade. Moreover the quantity indicates they were a standard issue munition, not just an experimental prototype.

The first cast-iron bombshells and grenades appeared in Europe in 1467, where their initial role was with the besieging and defense of castles and fortifications. A hoard of several hundred ceramic hand grenades was discovered during construction in front of a bastion of the Bavarian city of Ingolstadt, Germany, dated to the 17th century. Many of the grenades retained their original black powder loads and igniters. The grenades were most likely intentionally dumped in the moat of the bastion prior to 1723.

By the mid-17th century, infantry known as "grenadiers" began to emerge in the armies of Europe, who specialized in shock and close quarters combat, mostly with the usage of grenades and fierce melee combat. In 1643, it is possible that grenados were thrown amongst the Welsh at Holt Bridge during the English Civil War. The word grenade was also used during the events surrounding the Glorious Revolution in 1688, where cricket ball-sized (8.81 to 9 in (224 to 229 mm) in circumference) iron spheres packed with gunpowder and fitted with slow-burning wicks were first used against the Jacobites in the battles of Killiecrankie and Glen Shiel. These grenades were not very effective owing both to the unreliability of their fuse and the inconsistent times to detonation as a result, saw little use. Grenades were also used during the Golden Age of Piracy, especially during boarding actions; pirate Captain Thompson used "vast numbers of powder flasks, grenade shells, and stinkpots" to defeat two pirate-hunters sent by the Governor of Jamaica in 1721. By the 18th century, the popularity of hand grenades was declining

The fledgling American Navy used hand grenades as Captain Tyringham Howe reported one thrown from the top mast of a ship intercepting HMS Glasgow, 6 April 1776 in what is known as the Battle of Block Island.

Mexican forces used grenades in the Battle of the Alamo.

Improvised grenades were increasingly used from the mid-19th century, the confines of trenches enhancing the effect of small explosive devices. In a letter to his sister, Colonel Hugh Robert Hibbert described an improvised grenade that was employed by British troops during the Crimean War (1854–1856): Hand grenades were used by French and Russian forces during the Siege of Sebastopol.

A cross-section of a Ketchum grenade, used during the American Civil War

We have a new invention to annoy our friends in their pits. It consists in filling empty soda water bottles full of powder, old twisted nails and any other sharp or cutting thing we can find at the time, sticking a bit of tow in for a fuse then lighting it and throwing it quickly into our neighbors' pit where it bursts, to their great annoyance. You may imagine their rage at seeing a soda water bottle come tumbling into a hole full of men with a little fuse burning away as proud as a real shell exploding and burying itself into soft parts of the flesh.

During the Battle of Fort Sumter, grenades were kept at critical points of the fort such as the room over the gateway. About 93,200 Ketchum grenades were procured by the Union Army throughout the American Civil war; those weapons were used in the sieges of Vicksburg, Port Hudson and Petersburg. Grenades were issued to United States Ram Fleet and Union Navy vessels to repel boarders.The Augusta Arsenal manufactured around 13,000 hand grenades between 1863 and 1865, Confederate troops also used improvised grenades made from artillery shells to defend their positions.

In March 1868, during the Paraguayan War, the Paraguayan troops used hand grenades in their attempt to board Brazilian ironclad warships with canoes.

Hand grenades were used on naval engagements during the War of the Pacific.

British troops used hand grenades in Sudan between 1884 and 1885. By 1890, the British Army had totally removed grenades from its inventory

During the Siege of Mafeking, in the Second Boer War, the defenders used fishing rods and a mechanical spring device to throw improvised grenades.

During the Thousand Days War improvised grenades were thrown from slings, they only saw limited use because of the danger they posed to the user

Improvised hand grenades were used to great effect by the Russian defenders of Port Arthur (now Lüshun Port) during the Russo-Japanese War. At first, they were improvised from old iron cases or mountain gun shells. Later, they were replaced with cut down shell casings from quick-firing artillery; filled with dynamite or gun-cotton, and fitted with safety fuses. The workshops in Port Arthur could turn out 2,500 grenades in 24 hours. In the month of August alone 18,000 grenades were prepared.

Japanese forces also used grenades during the Russo-Japanese War. The first Japanese grenades were made from tin cans or bamboo tubes filled with gun-cotton, and fitted with fuses; they were lit with matches but later on, a percussion arrangement was improvised by means of a rifle cartridge (which acted as a primer) and steel wire.Japanese cavalry was also armed with grenades and threw them under the horses of the enemy when pursued.

=== Development of modern grenades ===
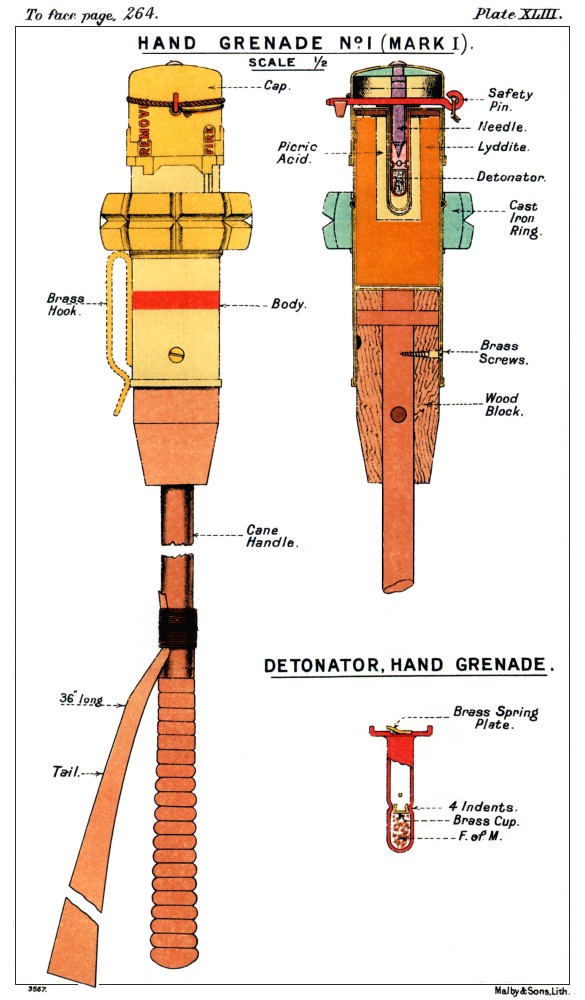
One of the earliest modern hand grenades. Fielded in the British Army from 1908, it was unsuccessful in the trenches of World War I, and was replaced by the Mills bomb.

Around the turn of the 20th century, the ineffectiveness of the available types of hand grenades, coupled with their levels of danger to the user and difficulty of operation, meant that they were regarded as increasingly obsolete pieces of military equipment. In 1902, the British War Office announced that hand grenades were obsolete and had no place in modern warfare. But, within two years, following the success of improvised grenades in the trench warfare conditions of the Russo-Japanese War, and reports from General Sir Aylmer Haldane, a British observer of the conflict, a reassessment was quickly made and the Board of Ordnance was instructed to develop a practical hand grenade. Various models using a percussion fuze were built, but this type of fuze suffered from various practical problems, and they were not commissioned in large numbers.

In 1904, Serbia adopted a grenade designed by Major Miodrag Vasić; it was partially inspired by copies of Bulgarian grenades manufactured by the Serbian Chetnik Organization.

In 1905 the French Army started training all branches of the army on how to use grenades.

Marten Hale, known for patenting the Hales rifle grenade, developed a modern hand grenade in 1906 but was unsuccessful in persuading the British Army to adopt the weapon until 1913. Hale's chief competitor was Nils Waltersen Aasen, who invented his design in 1906 in Norway, receiving a patent for it in England. Aasen began his experiments with developing a grenade while serving as a sergeant in the Oscarsborg Fortress. Aasen formed the Aasenske Granatkompani in Denmark, which before the First World War produced and exported hand grenades in large numbers across Europe. He had success in marketing his weapon to the French and was appointed as a Knight of the French Legion of Honour in 1916 for the invention.

The Royal Laboratory developed the No. 1 grenade in 1908. It contained explosive material with an iron fragmentation band, with an impact fuze, detonating when the top of the grenade hit the ground. A long cane handle (approximately 16 inches or 40 cm) allowed the user to throw the grenade farther than the blast of the explosion. It suffered from the handicap that the percussion fuse was armed before throwing, which meant that if the user was in a trench or other confined space, he was apt to detonate it and kill himself when he drew back his arm to throw it.

In 1912 during the Italo-Turkish War the Aasen grenades were adopted by the Italian Army, being also used by Italian pilots during the war in one of the earliest aerial bombings in history.

An improved version of Vasić's design was adopted by the Serbian Army in 1912; the grenade provide very useful during the First Balkan War, specially during the Siege of Adrianopole.

Before the beginning of the Second Balkan War, Serbian General Stepa Stepanović ordered that bomb equipped squads (consisting of one non-commissioned officer and 16 soldiers each) should be formed in all companies of the 4th, 13th, 14th, 15th and 20th Infantry Regiments of the Timočka Division.

The German Army adopted the Kugelhandgranate in 1913; it was meant to be used by pioneers to assault enemy positions.

Early in World War I, combatant nations only had small grenades, similar to Hales' and Aasen's design. The Italian Besozzi grenade had a five-second fuze with a match-tip that was ignited by striking on a ring on the soldier's hand.

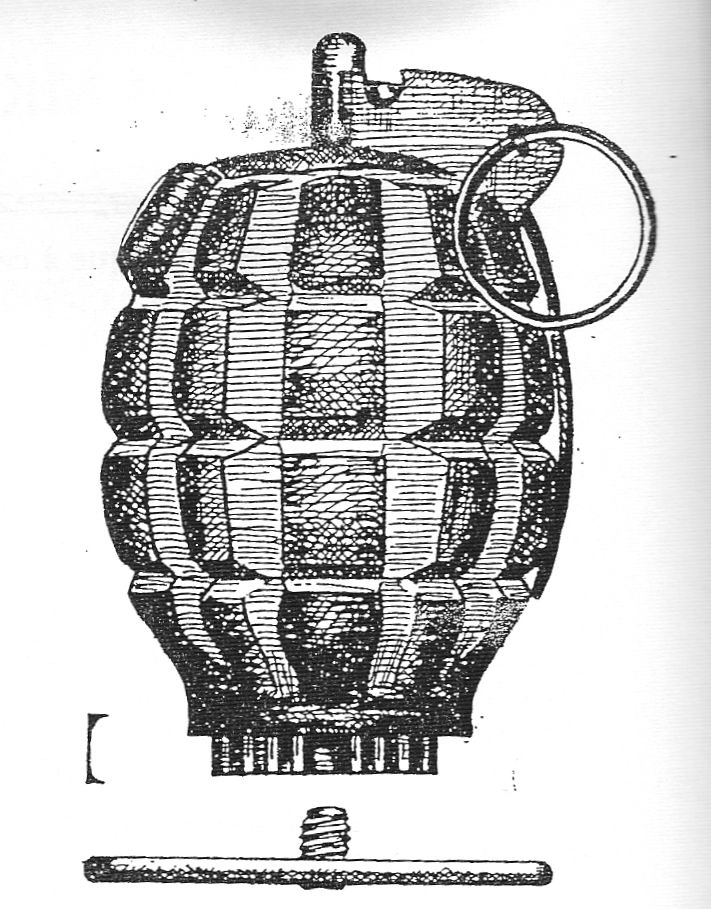
The Mills bomb – the first modern fragmentation grenade – was used in the trenches from 1915.

William Mills, a hand grenade designer from Sunderland, patented, developed and manufactured the "Mills bomb" at the Mills Munition Factory in Birmingham, England in 1915, designating it the No.5. It was described as the first "safe grenade". They were explosive-filled steel canisters with a triggering pin and a distinctive deeply notched surface. This segmentation is often erroneously thought to aid fragmentation, though Mills' own notes show the external grooves were purely to aid the soldier to grip the weapon. Improved fragmentation designs were later made with the notches on the inside, but at that time they would have been too expensive to produce. The external segmentation of the original Mills bomb was retained, as it provided a positive grip surface. This basic "pin-and-pineapple" design is still used in some modern grenades.

Hand grenade pin-and-lever fuze system

After the Second World War, the general design of hand grenades has been fundamentally unchanged, with pin-and-lever being the predominant igniter system with the major powers, though incremental and evolutionary improvements continuously were made. In 2012, Spränghandgranat 07 (shgr 07, "Blast hand-grenade 07") was announced as the first major innovation in the area of handgrenades since the Great War.
Developed by Ian Kinley at Försvarets Materielverk (FMV), shgr 07 is a self-righting, jumping hand grenade containing some 1,900 balls that covers a cone 10 metres in diameter with the centre about 2 metres in height. This minimize the dangers outside the lethal zone as there is little to no random scattering of fragments from the blast.

== Explosive grenades ==
=== Fragmentation ===
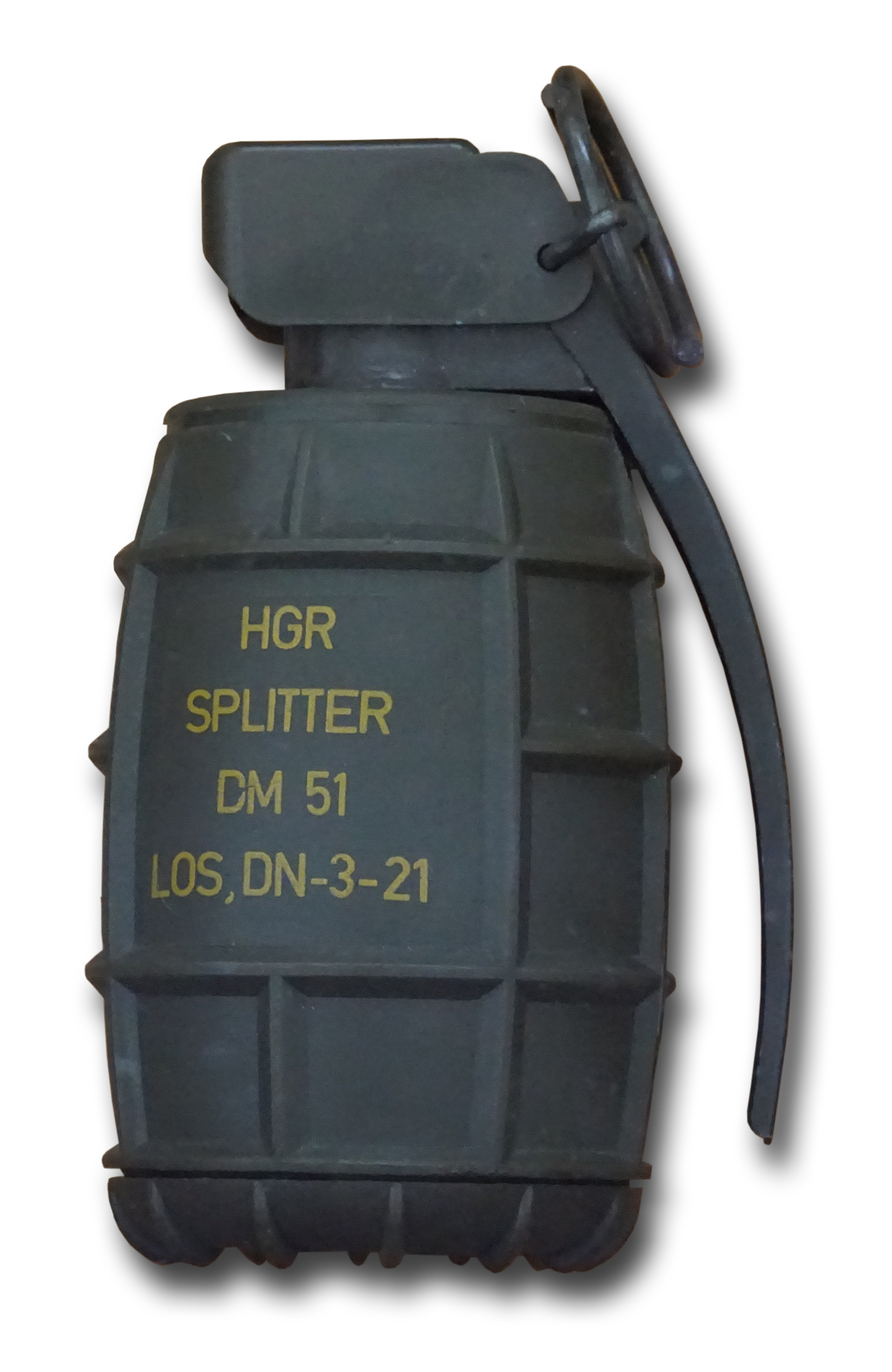
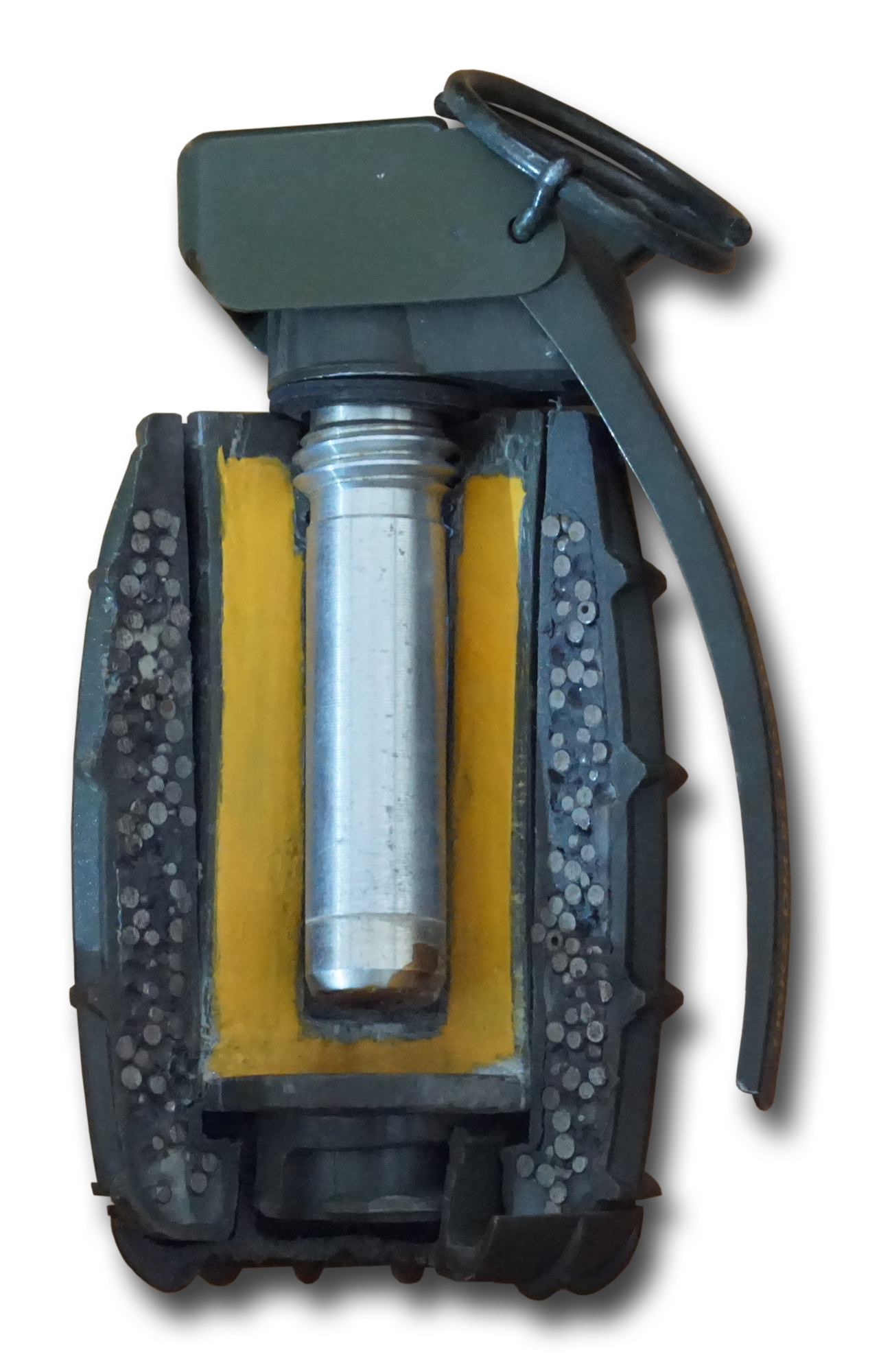
Modern DM51 fragmentation grenade with cross section

Fragmentation grenades are common in armies. They are weapons that are designed to disperse fragments on detonation, aimed to damage targets within the lethal and injury radii. The body is generally made of a hard synthetic material or steel, which will provide some fragmentation as shards and splinters, though in modern grenades a pre-formed fragmentation matrix is often used. The pre-formed fragmentation may be spherical, cuboid, wire or notched wire. Most explosive grenades are designed to detonate either after a time delay or on impact.

Modern fragmentation grenades, such as the United States M67 grenade, have a wounding radius of 15 m (50 ft) – half that of older style grenades, which can still be encountered – and can be thrown about 40 m (130 ft). Fragments may travel more than 200 m (660 ft).

=== High explosive ===
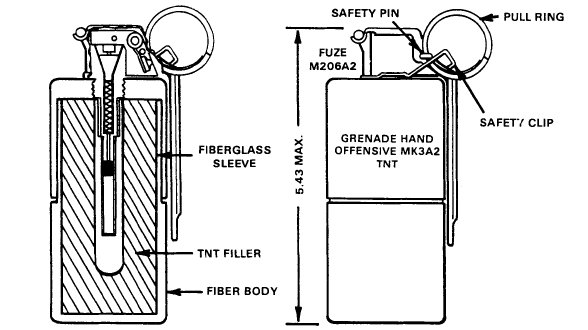
Diagram of the Mk3A2 concussion grenade

These grenades are usually classed as offensive weapons because the effective casualty radius (the distance from an explosion or weapon's impact where individuals are likely to be killed or injured) is much less than the distance it can be thrown, and its explosive power works better within more confined spaces, such as fortifications or buildings, which entrenched defenders often occupy. The concussion effect, rather than any expelled fragments, is the effective killer. In the case of the US Mk3A2, the casualty radius is published as 2 m (6 ft 7 in) in open areas, but fragments and bits of fuze may be projected as far as 200 m (660 ft) from the detonation point.

Concussion grenades have also been used as depth charges (underwater explosives) around boats and underwater targets; some like the US Mk 40 concussion grenade are designed for use against enemy divers and frogmen. Underwater explosions kill or otherwise incapacitate the target by creating a lethal shock wave underwater.

The US Army Armament Research, Development and Engineering Center (ARDEC) announced in 2016 that they were developing a grenade which could operate in either fragmentation or blast mode (selected at any time before throwing), the electronically fuzed enhanced tactical multi-purpose (ET-MP) hand grenade.

=== Thermobaric ===
Fuel-air explosive hand grenades like the Ukrainian RTG-27 series have been reported as effective in battlefield uses such as clearing dugouts and buildings. Grenades like the American XM 1060 for grenade launchers have also been used.

=== Anti-tank ===
Soviet RPG-43 HEAT grenade

During World War I, hand grenades were frequently used by troops, lacking other means to defend against enemy tanks threatening to over-run the position, to various success. The interwar period saw some limited development of grenades specifically intended to defeat armor, but it was not until the outbreak of WWII that serious efforts were made. While there were infantry anti-tank weapons available, they were either not ubiquitous enough, ineffective or both. Anti-tank grenades were a suitable stopgap to ensure a rudimentary capability for every squad to be used for self-defence. Once rocket-propelled shaped charges became available in greater numbers, anti-tank hand grenades became almost obsolete. However, they were still used with limited success in the Iraqi insurgency in the early 2000s against lightly armored mine-resistant ambush protected (MRAP) vehicles. In May 2022, during the Russo-Ukrainian War, Radio Free Europe reported that Ukrainian troops were using drones to drop modified RKG-3 anti-tank grenades on Russian vehicles, based on footage from Aerorozvidka.

=== Incendiary ===
During World War II, the United Kingdom used incendiary grenades based on white phosphorus. One model, the No. 76 special incendiary grenade, was mainly issued to the Home Guard as an anti-tank weapon. It was produced in vast numbers; by August 1941, well over 6,000,000 had been manufactured. Thermite grenades have also been used.

=== Sting ===
Sting grenades, also known as stingball or sting ball grenades, are stun grenades based on the design of the fragmentation grenade. Instead of using a metal casing to produce fragmentation, they are made from hard rubber and are filled with around 100 rubber or plastic balls. On detonation, these balls, and fragments from the rubber casing explode outward in all directions as reduced lethality projectiles, which may ricochet. It is intended that people struck by the projectiles will receive a series of fast, painful stings, without serious injury. Some types have an additional payload of CS gas.

Sting grenades do not reliably incapacitate people, so they can be dangerous to use against armed subjects. They sometimes cause serious physical injury, especially the rubber fragments from the casing. People have lost eyes and hands to sting grenades.

Sting grenades are sometimes called "stinger grenades", which is a genericized trademark as "Stinger" is trademarked by Defense Technology for its line of sting grenades.

=== Chemical and gas ===
Chemical and gas grenades burn or release a gas, and do not explode.

M18 US signal smoke grenade (yellow)

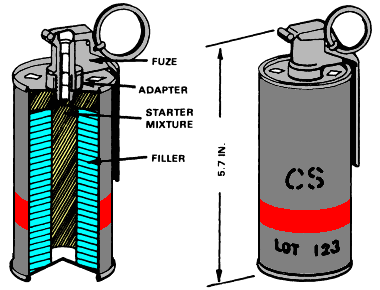
M7A2 CS gas grenade

=== Practice ===
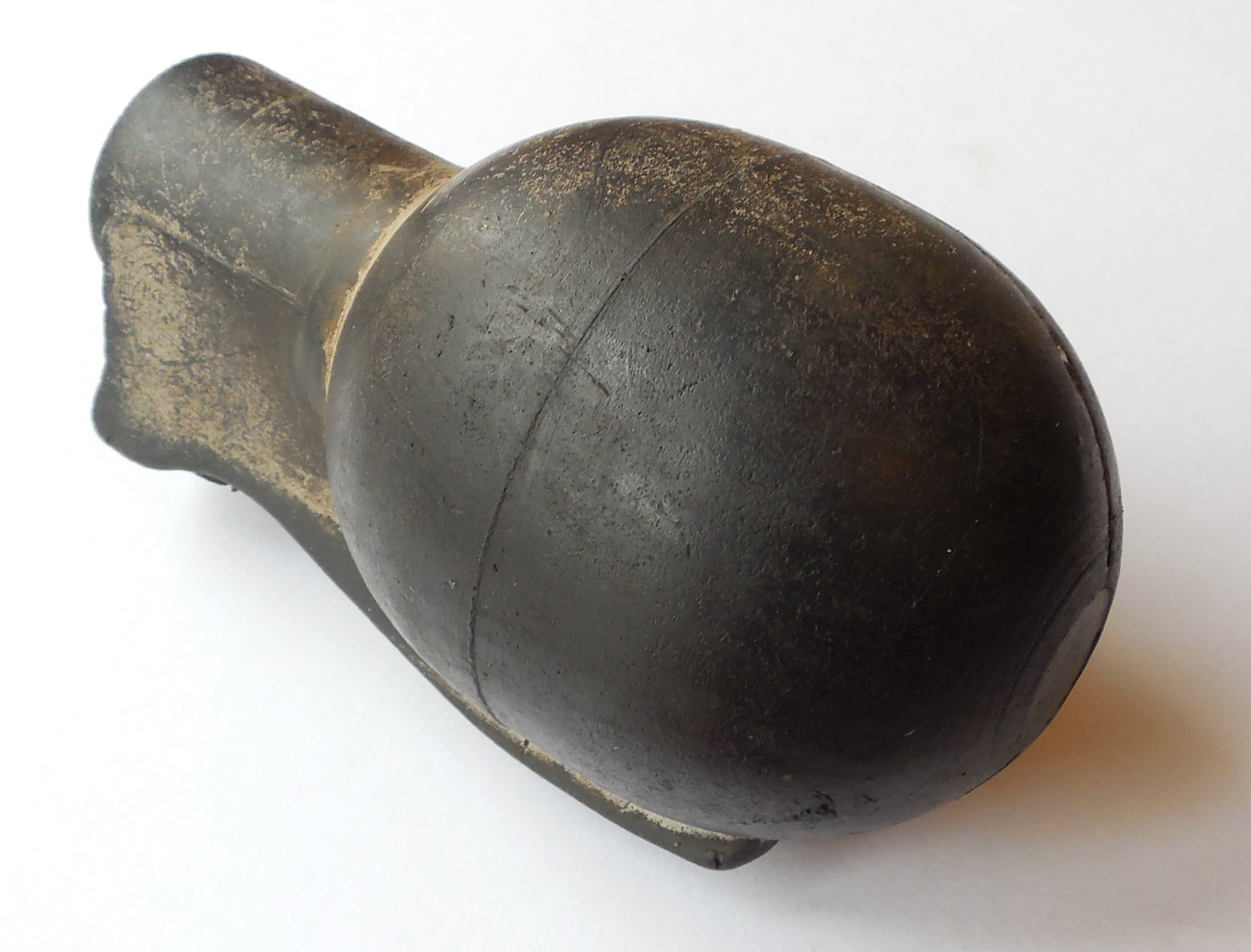
Inert training grenade made from hard rubber

Practice or simulation grenades are similar in handling and function to other hand grenades, except that they only produce a loud popping noise and a puff of smoke on detonation. The grenade body can be reused. Another type is the throwing practice grenade which is completely inert and often cast in one piece. It is used to give soldiers a feel for the mass and shape of real grenades and for practicing precision throwing. Examples of practice grenades include the K417 Biodegradable Practice Hand Grenade by CNOTech Korea.

== Igniters ==
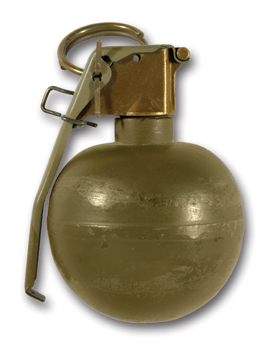
An M67 grenade has a theoretical effective kill zone radius of 5 m (16 ft), while the casualty-inducing radius is approximately 15 m (49 ft).

When using a hand grenade, the objective is to have the grenade explode so that the target is within its effective radius while keeping the thrower out of the same. For this reason, several systems have been used to trigger the explosion.

Impact was the first used, with fragile containers of Greek fire that ruptured when landing. Later impact fuzes contained some kind of sensitive explosive to either initiate the main charge directly, or set off a primer charge that in turn detonates the main charge. This turned out to present significant drawbacks; either the primer is so sensitive that unintended and premature ignition happens, while a more stable substance often fails to set off the grenade when landing in softer ground, not seldom even allowing the targeted troops to hurl the grenade back. Thus, the only significant use of impact fuzes since WWI has been in anti-tank grenades.

Fuze-delayed grenades is the predominant system today, developed from the match-fuzes that were hand-lit in the early grenades. From there, two sub-groups were developed: friction-igniters where a cord is pulled or a cap is twisted to ignite the delay-fuze like on the German Stielhandgranate; the other being strike- or percussion-igniters where the user either hits the cap before the throw like on the Japanese Type 10 grenade, or have a spring-loaded striker hit the cap after the grenade is released like the Mills bomb, with the latter being predominant since WWII. There is also an alternative technique of throwing, where the grenade is not thrown immediately after the fuze is ignited, which allows the fuze to burn partially and decrease the time to detonation after throwing; this is referred to as "cooking". A shorter delay is useful to reduce the ability of the enemy to take cover, throw or kick the grenade away and can also be used to allow a fragmentation grenade to explode into the air over defensive positions.

Concerned with serious incidents and accidents involving hand grenades, Ian Kinley at the Swedish Försvarets materielverk identified the two main issues as the time-fuze's burntime variation with temperature (slowing down in cold and speeding up in heat) and the springs, the striker spring in particular, coming pre-tensioned from the factory by mechanism designs that had not changed much since the 1930s. In 2019, a new mechanism, fully interchangeable with the old ones, was adopted into service. The main difference, apart from a fully environmentally stable delay, is that the springs now are twist-tensioned by the thrower after the transport safety (pin and ring) has been removed, thus eliminating the possibility of unintentional arming of the hand grenade.

== Manufacturing ==
Modern manufacturers of hand grenades include:

- Agenzia Industrie della Difesa (Italy)
- Diehl (Germany)
- Mecar (Belgium)
- Rheinmetall (formerly Arges, Austria)
- Ruag (Switzerland)
- Nammo (Norway)
- Instalaza (Spain)
- Solar Industries (India)
- MKEK (Turkey)

== See also ==
- F1 grenade (France)
- F-1 grenade (Russia)
- Jam tin grenade
- Stielhandgranate
- Pipe bomb
- Satchel charge
- Technology of the Song Dynasty
- TM 31-210 Improvised Munitions Handbook
