= No. 1 grenade =

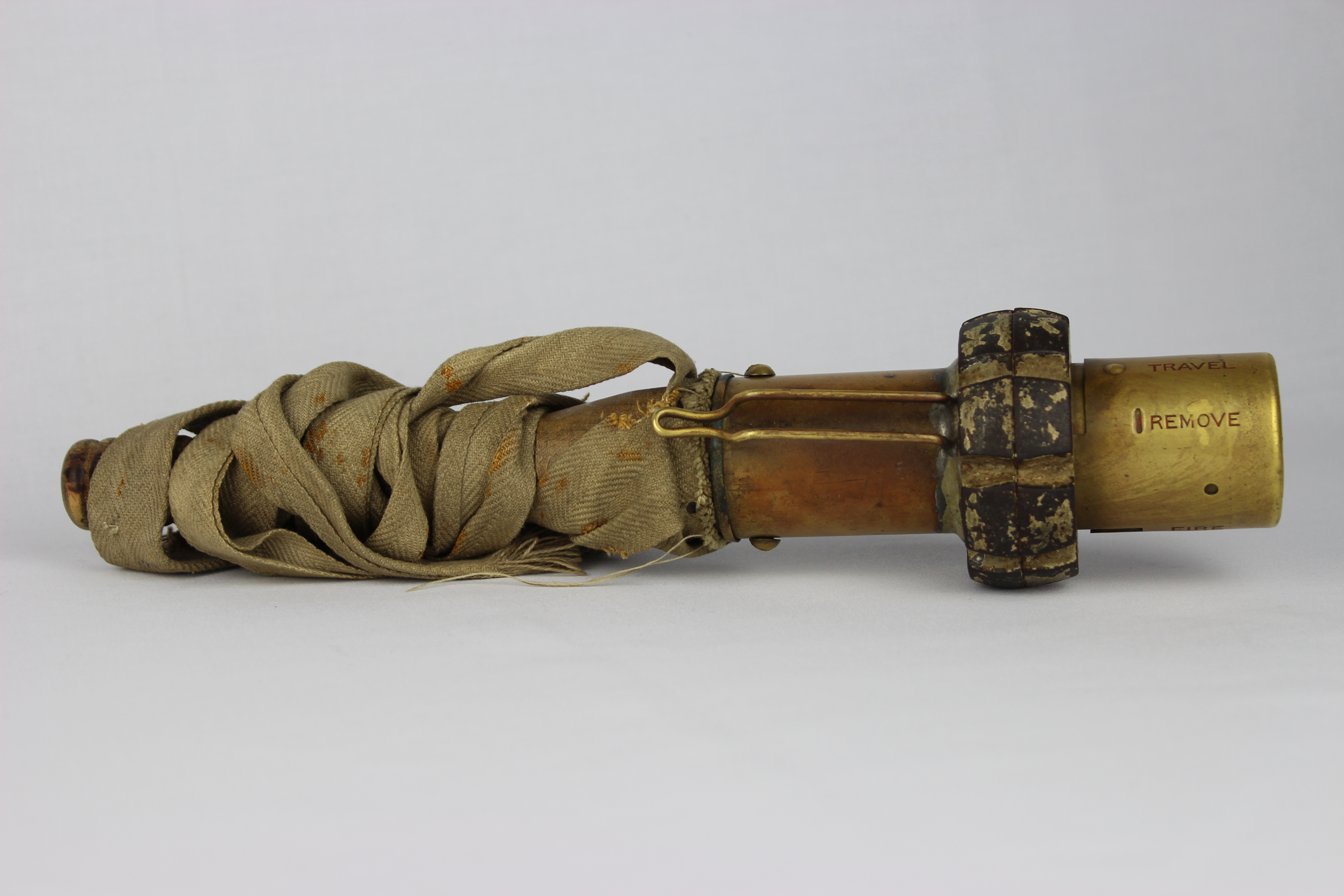
- Hand grenade No. 1 Mark I
- Type: Hand grenade
- Place of origin: United Kingdom

Service history
- Used by: United Kingdom
- Wars: World War I

Production history
- Designer: Royal Laboratories
- Designed: 1908
- Produced: 1908-1915
- Variants: No. 3 (shorter handle), No. 18 (different detonator)

Specifications
- Mass: 2 lb (0.9 kg)
- Filling: Lyddite
- Detonation mechanism: Percussion fuse (impact detonated)

The Grenade, Hand, No. 1 was the first British hand grenade used in World War I. It was designed in the Royal Laboratory, based on reports and samples of Japanese hand grenades during the Russo-Japanese War provided by General Sir Aylmer Haldane, who was a British observer of that war.

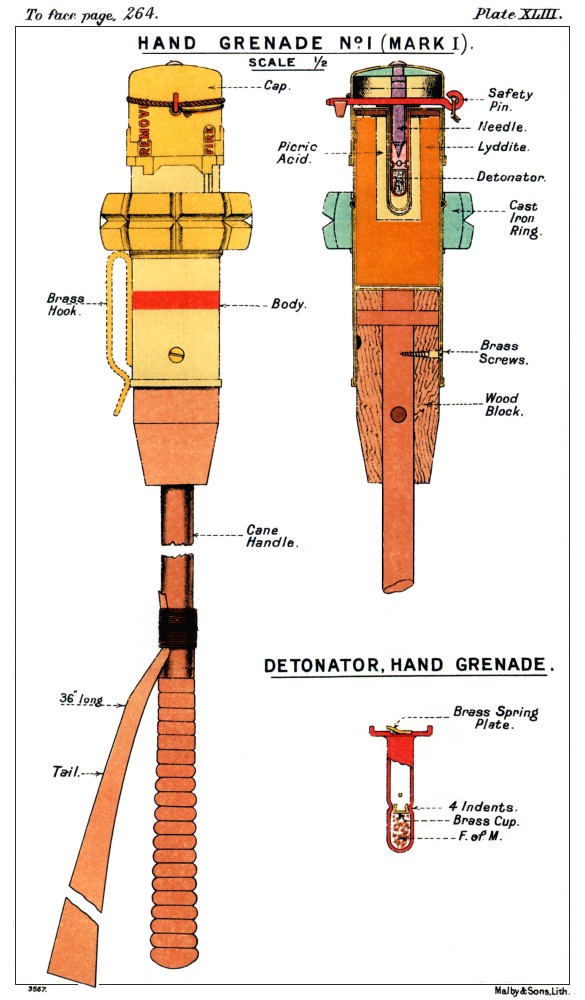
Detailed diagram and cross section of the No. 1 grenade

The grenade proper is a container of explosive material with an iron fragmentation band. The fuse was of the impact sort, detonating when the top of the grenade hit the ground. A long cane handle (approximately 16 inches or 40 cm) allowed the user to throw the grenade further than the blast of the explosion.

To ensure that the grenade hit the ground nose first, a cloth streamer was attached to the end of the handle. When thrown, this unfurled and acted as a tail to stabilize flight. The grenade came with a metal loop so it could hang from a belt.

== In the trenches ==
When the battlefield became confined to the trenches, the long handle became a liability, causing several accidents. Reaching back for the throw, the fuse could strike the trench side. The No. 3, a variant of the No. 1, had a shorter handle for easier use in trenches.

Even with these adjustments, the No. 1 and its variants did poorly in battle. According to German prisoners captured at Ypres in January 1916, the No. 1 could be deflected by wooden boards. In some cases, the deflected grenade could be thrown back.

Manufacturing the No. 1 was difficult, as it required a special detonator that could only be produced by the ordnance factories. Because of this, the British Expeditionary Force got far fewer No. 1s than were ordered. A version that used a more common detonator, the No. 18, was designed, but by then battlefield experience had shown that the No. 1's design was ineffective.

The difficulty of operating it in trenches plus the special detonator caused Britain to create several stopgap grenades, such as the jam tin grenade, until the Mills bomb was adopted.
