= Kistiakowsky =

Kistiakowsky is a surname. Notable people with the surname include:

- Alexander Kistiakowsky (1904–1983), Ukrainian ornithologist
- George Kistiakowsky (1900–1982), Ukrainian-American physical chemist
- Vera Kistiakowsky (1928–2021), American physicist
