= Duncan McDougall =

Duncan McDougall may refer to:

- Duncan McDougall (fur trader) (died 1818)
- Duncan McDougall (rower) (born 1959), British rower

== See also ==
- Duncan MacDougall (disambiguation)
