= Duncan Peck MacDougall =

American Manhattan Project scientist

- Born: April 13, 1909; College Station, Texas, U.S.
- Died: June 7, 1990 (aged 81); Los Alamos, New Mexico, U.S.
- Education: Pomona College, University of California
- Known for: Explosives research for the Manhattan Project; co-author of Explosives with Lined Cavities
- Scientific career
- Fields: Chemistry, explosives research
- Workplaces: Explosives Research Laboratory, Los Alamos Scientific Laboratory

Duncan Peck MacDougall (died June 7, 1990) was an American explosives scientist associated with the Manhattan Project at Los Alamos during World War II. During the war, he was involved with Project Q, a research group based in Bruceton, Pennsylvania, that conducted implosion experiments in support of atomic bomb development.

His research included detonation and shock waves, the desensitization of RDX, and shaped-charge jet formation. In 1948, he co-authored Explosives with Lined Cavities, which a later study described as a definitive paper on the Munroe effect.

== Early life and education ==
Duncan Peck MacDougall was born on April 13, 1909, in College Station, Texas, to Frank Henry MacDougall, a chemistry professor, and Frances Mary (née Aborn).

MacDougall graduated from Pomona College in Claremont, California. He later earned a doctorate in chemistry from the University of California in 1933.

== Career ==
=== Manhattan Project ===
In January 1941, MacDougall joined the Explosives Research Laboratory (ERL) in Bruceton, Pennsylvania, as deputy research director. From 1943 to 1946, he served as deputy director of the laboratory and directed its work on the research, development, and physical testing of high explosives.

At the ERL, MacDougall directed experimental research on detonation rates and shock waves. The program produced extensive data on the behavior of explosives and examined effects that had previously received little systematic study. He also began the laboratory's research into reducing the mechanical sensitivity of RDX by combining it with wax. One composition developed through that work was later adopted by the United States Navy for antiaircraft ammunition.

By March 1943, MacDougall and George Kistiakowsky were taking part in joint American and British meetings on shaped-charge research in Washington. They shared theories and experimental results on the Munroe effect with Garrett Birkhoff and researchers from the DuPont Company and several American universities.

MacDougall also worked with the Los Alamos laboratory on the implosion program. He headed Project Q, a Bruceton-based research effort that carried out experiments for Los Alamos on explosive lenses and other problems associated with implosion.

As part of this work, MacDougall and an associate developed a modified form of Baratol for use in the explosive lenses of the Fat Man atomic bomb. Los Alamos needed a slow explosive that could be paired with Composition B to shape the detonation wave. Their formulation contained a higher proportion of barium nitrate than earlier mixtures, reducing its detonation velocity to the level required for the lens system.

=== Medal for Merit ===
In June 1948, General Omar Bradley, Chief of Staff of the United States Army, presented MacDougall with the Medal for Merit, the highest civilian decoration awarded by the United States during World War II.

MacDougall's official citation, signed by President Harry S. Truman, recognized his "exceptionally meritorious conduct in the performance of outstanding services" as a consultant, section chairman, and member of the Explosives Division of the National Defense Research Committee, and as a member of its Division on Terminal Ballistics.

=== Scientific publications ===
In 1948, MacDougall co-authored the paper Explosives with Lined Cavities with Garrett Birkhoff, Emerson M. Pugh, and Geoffrey Taylor. Published in the Journal of Applied Physics, the paper presented a mathematical and experimental analysis of shaped-charge explosives, explaining how metal-lined explosive cavities form high-velocity jets capable of penetrating armor.

The 1948 paper continued to be cited and discussed in later technical literature. A 2026 article in the Journal of Applied Physics referenced the work in its discussion of the historical development of shaped-charge jet theory.

A 1990 history published by the U.S. Army Ballistic Research Laboratory listed MacDougall among the principal NDRC scientists involved in American shaped-charge research. It cited the 1948 paper among the analytical models developed and verified using flash-radiography and partial-collapse studies.

A 2021 article in Nuclear Technology described the paper as a definitive work on the Munroe effect based on wartime collaboration.

=== Postwar career ===
MacDougall remained at Los Alamos Scientific Laboratory following World War II. He succeeded George Kistiakowsky, who had directed X Division during the Manhattan Project, as leader of the laboratory's high-explosives organization. In 1948, Los Alamos combined X Division with M Division (Implosion) and G Division (Gadget) to form GMX Division. MacDougall was appointed its first leader and directed the division until 1970.

In 1954, MacDougall was part of a group of Los Alamos scientists publicly associated with support for J. Robert Oppenheimer after the Oppenheimer security board hearing alleged that he was a security risk.

In 1970, laboratory director Harold Agnew appointed MacDougall assistant director for weapons.

MacDougall retired from Los Alamos Scientific Laboratory in 1976.

== Death ==
MacDougall died on June 7, 1990, in Los Alamos, New Mexico.
