= Bogdan Kistyakovski =

Ukrainian philosopher, jurist, and sociologist (1869–1920)

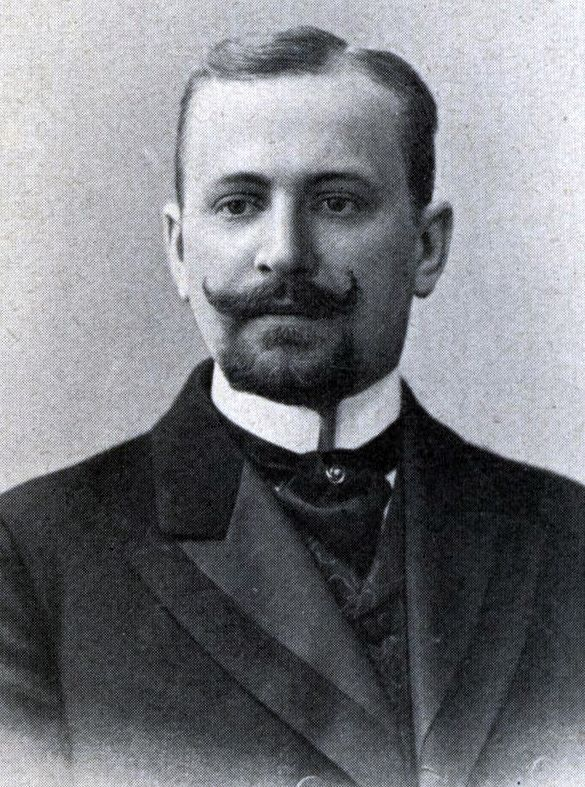
Bogdan Kistyakovski

Bogdan (Fedor) Aleksandrovich Kistyakovski or Kistiakowsky (Russian: Богдан (Федoр) Александрович Кистяковский; 16 November 1869 – 16 April 1920) was a Ukrainian philosopher, jurist, and sociologist. He reached prominence with his Gesellschaft und Einzelwesen (Society and Individuals) published in Berlin in 1899. Philosophically he defended transcendental idealism. In 1902 he contributed to Problems of Idealism (Problemy Idealizma), edited by Pavel Novgorodtsev. In 1909 he contributed the essay "In Defense of Law" to the anthology Vekhi (Landmarks).

== Biography ==
=== Early life ===
Bogdan Kistyakovski was born in Kiev, Kiev Governorate of the Russian Empire (now Kyiv, Ukraine) on 16 November 1869. His father, Aleksander Kistyakovski, was a professor of criminal law at the St. Vladimir Imperial University of Kiev and the president of the Legal Society of Kiev.

Kistyakovski later remarked that he felt he had always struggled for his Ukrainian national identity and that he had been 'Russianized'.

=== Education ===
Between 1888 and 1892, Kistyakovski was expelled from the history and philology departments of the St. Vladimir Imperial University of Kiev and the Imperial Kharkov University, as well as the law school of the Imperial University of Dorpat due to his participation in underground revolutionary groups.

He was arrested in connection to nationalist groups in 1892, and when he was released in 1895, Kistyakovski decided to continue his studies abroad. He attended the University of Berlin, the Sorbonne, and the University of Strasbourg. In 1898, he defended a philosophy doctoral dissertation entitled 'On Society and the Individual', which was published in Berlin the following year and received acclaim from German thinkers.

=== Family ===
Kistyakovski married Maria Kistiakovskaya (née Berenshtam) (Russian: Мария Вильямовна Беренштам-Кистяковская), who taught at workers' schools in St. Petersburg with Nadezhda Krupskaya. They had two sons: the American chemist George Kistiakowsky, and the Ukrainian ornithologist Alexander Kistiakowsky.

== Philosophy and law career ==
Upon return to Russia, Kistyakovski became a lecturer in state and administrative law at the Moscow Commercial Institute and later worked at the University of Moscow and in Yaroslavl. His writings were influenced by leading German thinkers, notably neo-Kantian philosophers and Georg Jellinek. He was a friend of Max Weber, whose views on the need for reform in Russian politics he shared.

In 1902, he contributed an article to the Problems of Idealism (Problemy Idealizma) (Russian: Проблемы идеализма) on the revival of natural law doctrine. The ideas expressed in the collection were critical of the core beliefs of the radical intelligentsia, but they were expressed in a sufficiently academic way so as not to cause controversy. It included essays criticizing the historical theories of Marx and Engels and critiques of Comte and Mikhaylovsky.

In 1905, Kistyakovski published an article in the first issue of the literary-social journal Voprosy zhizni, which was edited by Nikolai Losskii. The article called for the recognition of the significance of the individual and their rights and argued that civil rights are absolute and inalienable.

In 1909, Kistyakovski contributed an article entitled 'In Defense of Law: The Intelligentsia and Legal Consciousness' to Vekhi. The article argued that the intelligentsia have no interest in the law and no legal consciousness. He criticizes the intelligentsia for ignoring the idea of 'intuitive law' and viewing legal systems as only something external. He also directly connected the lack of legal consciousness to the intelligentsia's rejection of a constitutional system, which he argues is the only system of government that can guarantee freedom and individual rights.

Through his writings, Kistyakovski became a leading advocate of constitutionalism in Russia. His principal work, Social Science and Law (1916), attempted to establish a theory of law in the context of the social sciences, through a critical analysis of the principal schools of legal theory of his time.

In 1917, he became a professor at the St. Vladimir University of Kiev and also was involved in organising the Ukrainian Federal Democratic Party. In 1919, he was elected a full member of the National Academy of Sciences of Ukraine. Kistyakovski fell ill traveling in 1919 and died in Yekaterinodar in 1920.

== Bibliography ==
- Meduschewskij, Andrej (2001). "Kistjakowskij, Bogdan Alexandrovič". In Michael Stolleis (ed.). Juristen: ein biographisches Lexikon; von der Antike bis zum 20. Jahrhundert (in German) (2nd ed.). München: Beck. p. 358. ISBN 3-406-45957-9.
