= Vekhi =

1909 Russian philosophical anthology

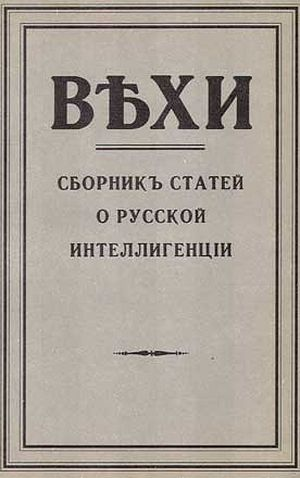
Vekhi cover in Russian

Vekhi (Russian: Вехи, IPA: [ˈvʲexʲɪ], lit. 'Landmarks') is a collection of seven essays published in Russia in 1909. It was distributed in five editions and elicited over two hundred published rejoinders in two years. The volume reappraising the Russian intelligentsia was a brainchild of the literary historian Mikhail Gershenzon, who edited it and wrote the introduction.

== Founding ==
Peter Struve selected the contributors, five of whom had previously contributed to a 1902 volume, Problems of Idealism, and he had attended the 1903 Schaffhausen Conference that laid the foundation for the Union of Liberation. A founder of the Constitutional Democratic Party in 1905, Struve had served in the Second Duma in 1907, then went on to edit the journal Russian Thought. In his essay, he argued that the intelligentsia owed its identity to standing apart from the government because it had coalesced in the 1840s under the impact of atheistic socialism. Thus, when the government agreed to restructure along constitutional lines in 1905, the intelligentsia proved incapable of acting constructively toward the masses, within the new framework.

== Contents ==
- Mikhail Gershenzon: Foreword
- Nikolai Berdyayev: "Philosophical Truth and Intellectual Truth"
- Sergei Bulgakov: "Heroism and Asceticism"
- Mikhail Gershenzon: "Creative Self-Awareness"
- Alexander Izgoyev: "About Intelligent Youth"
- Bogdan Kistyakovski: "In Defense of Law"
- Peter Struve: "The Intelligentsia and the Revolution"
- Semyon Frank: "Ethics of Nihilism"

== Social criticism ==
Bogdan Kistyakovsky discussed the intelligentsia's failure to develop a legal consciousness. Their insufficient respect for law as an ordering force kept courts of law from attaining the respect required in a modern society. Reflecting on the distressing character of revolutionary processes in Russia, he laid the blame on both the Slavophiles and the Westernizers for representatives of both currents displayed negligence with regard to law and even found certain merits in the weakness of the lawful state in Russia. Kistyakovsky pointed out that Alexander Herzen, the key-figure of the early Westernizer movement, saw in that a way to a quicker and easier overthrow of the regime in power, but Konstantin Aksakov considered it to be another manifestation of Russia's uniqueness: abstaining from law, the Russian people chose the path of "inner truth". Ideas of justice were drawn in the country from fiction, not from legal treatises. In contrast, it was law, according to Kistyakovsky, that could provide an individual with both personal freedom and social discipline. The constitutional state emerges and develops to reflect people's solidary interests. It unites people and promotes mutual solidarity, thus contributing to individuals' personal growth. Kistyakovsky saw the ultimate embodiment of the lawful state in the socialist state, which would realize all the lawful principles declared. All citizens' rights would be fulfilled, people would govern the country and solidarity would reach its summit.

Alexander Izgoyev (who, like Gershenzon, had not contributed to the 1902 anti-positivist volume) depicted contemporary university students as morally relativist, content merely to embrace the interests of the longsuffering people. Russian students compared very unfavourably to their French, German, and British counterparts, lacking application and even a sense of fair play.

== Philosophical positions ==
Nikolai Berdyayev, considering the intelligentsia's philosophical position, found utilitarian values had crowded out any interest in pursuing truth. Sergei Bulgakov showed how the intelligentsia had undertaken a heroic struggle for socialism and progress but lost sight of post-Reformation Europe's gains with respect to individual rights and personal freedom.

Nikolay Lossky, the father of Vladimir Lossky, also made periodic contributions to the debate. For Semen Frank, as for Gershenzon and Struve, the intelligentsia's failure of leadership in the 1905 revolution warranted a reappraisal of their fundamental assumptions. His essay emphasised the nihilistic sources of the intelligentsia's utilitarianism: material progress and national education were always viewed as a means to another end. Moreover, he saw Russian Marxists as obsessed by a populist drive to perfect society through redistribution and faulted them for their penchant for dividing all humanity into friends and enemies. Gershenzon asserted, in the book's most controversial sentence, that "so far from dreaming of union with the people we ought to fear the people and bless this government which, with its prisons and bayonets, still protects us from the people's fury".

The essays suggested that Russia had reached a milestone and was ready for turning. Five of the contributors had earlier abandoned Marxism under the influence of neo-Kantian concerns, over personal freedom and morality. They had participated in the establishment of a liberal political party but now recoiled at the Cadet Party's recklessness and ineffectiveness in parliamentary politics. A modernist document, Vekhi called for a rethinking of the Enlightenment project of acculturation and proposed exploration of the depths of the self as an alternative to populist and nihilist programs.

== Bibliography ==
- Philip Boobbyer, S. L. Frank: The Life and Work of a Russian Philosopher 1877-1950 (1995. Athens: Ohio University Press)
- Jeffrey Brooks, 'Vekhi and the Vekhi Dispute', in Survey 19(1), pp. 21–50, 1973.
- Samuel Kassow, Students, Professors, and the State in Tsarist Russia (1989. Berkeley: University of California Press)
- Read, Christopher, Religion, Revolution and the Russian Intelligentsia: The Vekhi debate and its Intellectual Background (1979. London and New York: Macmillan)
- Aizlewood, Robin, and Ruth Coates, eds. Landmarks Revisited: The Vekhi Symposium One Hundred Years On. Academic Studies Press, 2013. .
- Poltoratzky, Nikolai P. "Lev Tolstoy and 'Vekhi.'" The Slavonic and East European Review 42, no. 99 (1964): 332–52. .
- Leonard Schapiro, 'The Vekhi Group and the Mystique of Revolution', in Russian Studies, ed. E. Dahrendorf (1987. New York: Viking Penguin)
- N. Zernov, The Russian Religious Renaissance of the Twentieth Century (1963), esp. p. 111-130
- Horowitz, Brian (2016), "Unity in "Landmarks" ("Vekhi")?: The Tensions between Petr Struve and Mikhail Gershenzon", Znanie. Ponimanie. Umenie, 13 (2): 329–342, doi:10.17805/zpu.2016.2.29, archived from the original on 22 September 2017.
