= Mikhail Gershenzon =

Russian scholar

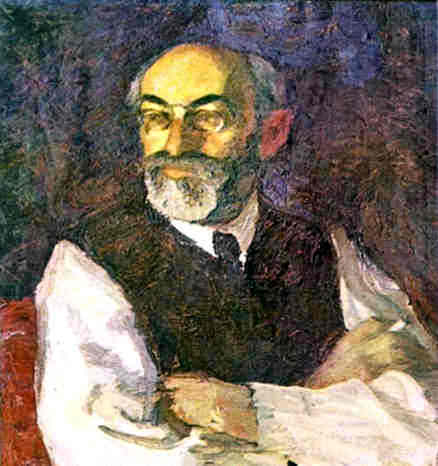
- Mikhail Gershenzon in 1917, by Leonid Pasternak
- Born: July 1, 1869; Chișinău, Russian Empire
- Died: February 19, 1925 (aged 55); Moscow, RSFSR, Soviet Union
- Education: Imperial Moscow University (1894)

Mikhail Osipovich Gershenzon (Russian: Михаи́л О́сипович Гершензо́н) (Kishinev, July 13 [O.S. July 1] 1869 - Moscow, 19 February 1925) was a Russian scholar, essayist and editor. He studied history, philosophy, and political science at Moscow University, graduating in 1894. From graduation until the Bolshevik revolution he was unable to obtain an official academic position because he was Jewish. He was a literary reviewer for Nauchnoe Slovo (Scientific word) from 1903 to 1905 and for Vestnik Evropy (Herald of Europe) in 1907–08, and was literary editor of Kriticheskoe Obozrenie (Critical review), 1907–09. He had a common-law relationship with Maria Goldenveizer from 1904 (Jews and Orthodox Christians were unable to marry legally); they had a daughter and a son. In 1909 he edited the famous essay collection Vekhi, for which he wrote the introduction and an essay.

During the Civil War he worked in various sections of the People's Commissariat for Education (Narkompros). He was first chair of the Moscow Writers' Union in 1918 and of the All-Russian Writers' Union in 1920–21, during which years he was also a member of the leadership of Narkompros; he was head of the literary section, Moscow Academy of Artistic Sciences from 1922 to 1925.

== Selected publications ==
- “The Destinies of the Jewish People”. Telos 58 (Winter 1983-84). New York: Telos Press.
