= Mills bomb =

Type of hand grenade

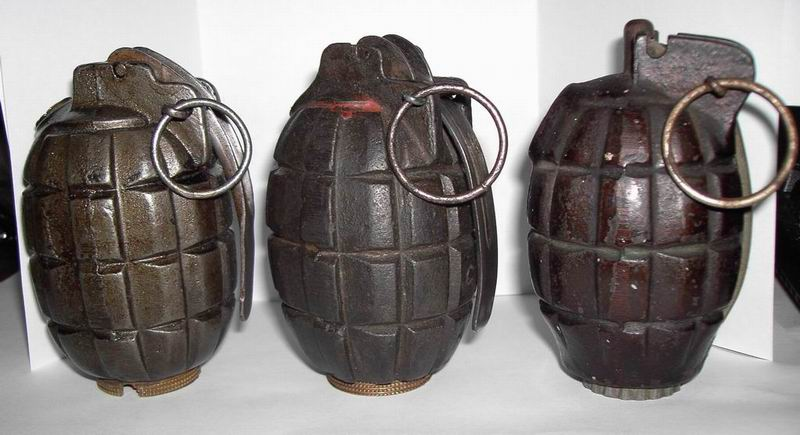
- Mills bombs. From left to right : No. 5, No. 23, No. 36
- Type: Hand grenade
- Place of origin: United Kingdom

Service history
- In service: 1915–2021

Production history
- Designed: 1915
- No. built: over 75 million
- Variants: No. 5; No. 23 Mk I, II and III; No. 36 Mk I; No. 36M Mk I; No. 36 Mk II

Specifications
- Mass: 765 g (1 lb 11.0 oz)
- Length: 95.2 mm (3.75 in)
- Diameter: 61 mm (2.4 in)
- Filling: Baratol
- Detonation mechanism: Percussion cap and time delay fuse: 7 seconds, later reduced to 4

"Mills bomb" is the popular name for a series of British hand grenades which were designed by William Mills. They were the first modern fragmentation grenades used by the British Army and saw widespread use in the First and Second World Wars.

== Development ==
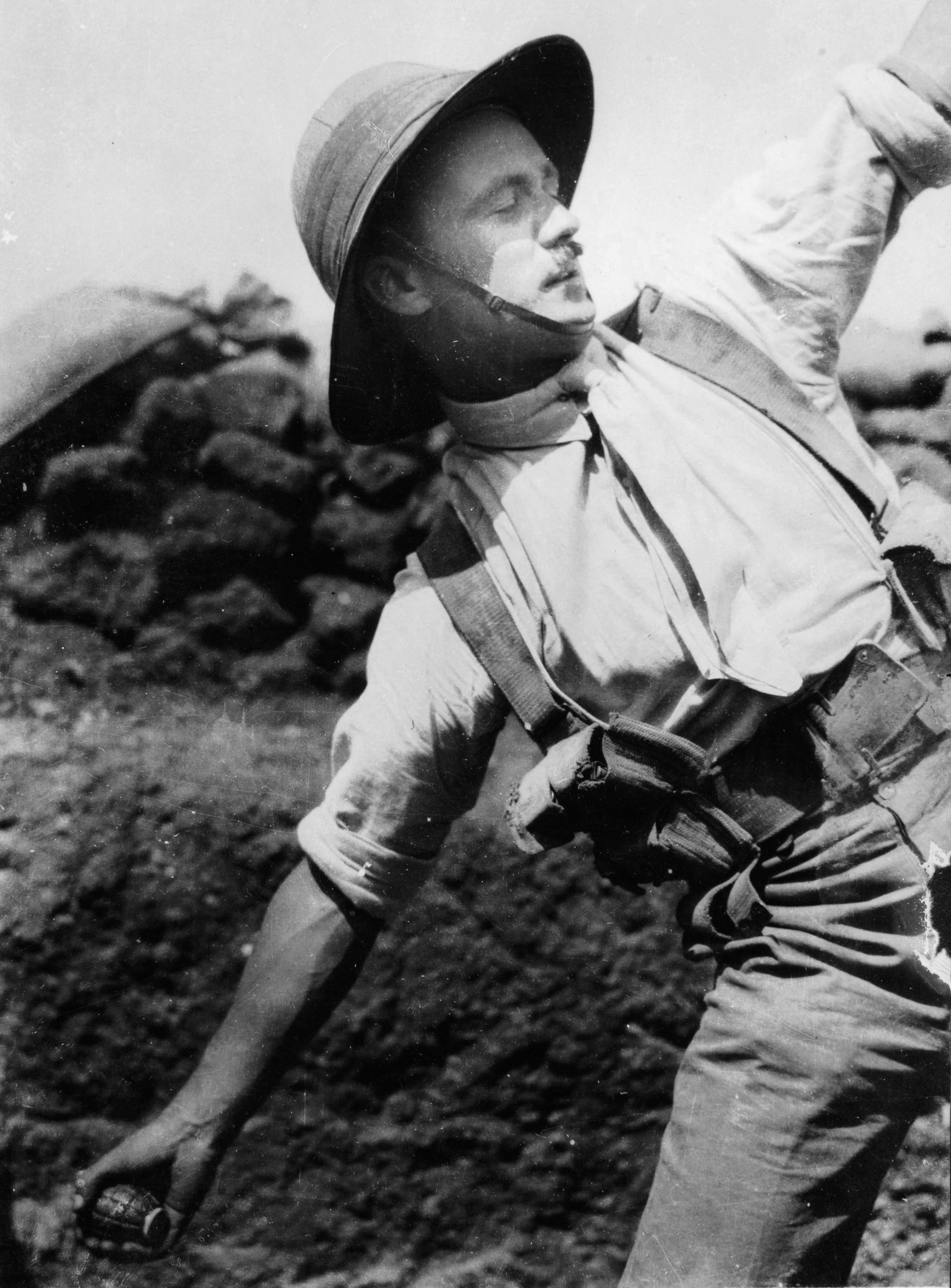
An officer of the British Salonika Army demonstrates how to "lob" a Mills bomb during the First World War

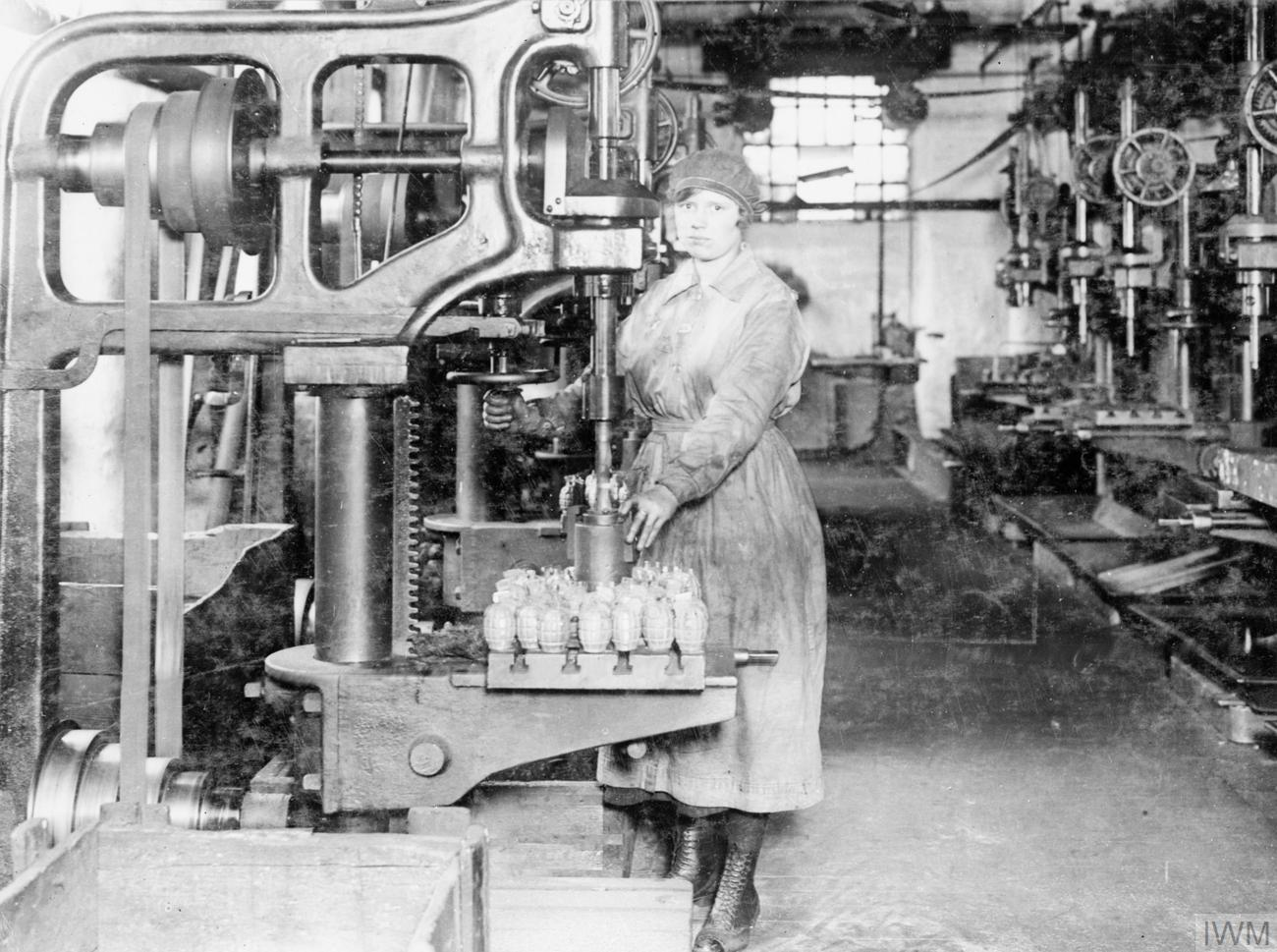
A worker manufacturing Mills bombs during World War I

William Mills, a hand grenade designer from Sunderland, patented, developed and manufactured the "Mills bomb" at the Mills Munitions Factory in Birmingham, England, in 1915.

The Mills bomb was inspired by an earlier design by Belgian captain Leon Roland, who later engaged in a patent lawsuit. The Roland grenade was a segmented sphere with multiple internal chambers for the fuze and filled with cast iron segments, which made it a complex and expensive design. In January 1915, the Mills Factory made four Roland grenades for evaluation by the War Office; during testing the grenades failed to detonate properly and was promptly rejected as unreliable and unsafe.

Mills continued working on the Roland design and by early February 1915, he made some technical drawings. The first proposed design had a cylindrical shape with external serrations instead of the spherical or oval shapes used by the Roland and the production Mills grenades respectively; the first prototypes were tested on 20 February 1915, and with a few modifications the Mills Bomb was soon approved mass production, with the British government placing orders for 150,000 grenades in April 1915.

Col. Arthur Morrow, a New Zealand Wars officer, also believed aspects of his patent were incorporated into the Mills Bomb.

Besides slow initial production rates, which forced the British to standardize improvised designs such as the Jam tin grenade and the Hairbrush grenade for mass production as a stopgap measure, the Mills bomb No. 5 also suffered from some design flaws, including premature detonations and a poorly designed safety pin, which could be accidentally dislodged with a minimal amount of movement, leading to modifications to the design itself and training procedures; The No. 5 was later modified as the No. 23, which could be either thrown by hand or launched as a rifle grenade.

Due the No. 5 initial flaws, the British worked on the No. 54 grenade as a replacement from 1916 until 1935, when the Army decided to retain the improved and combat-tested Mills bomb No. 36M in service.

== Design ==
The Mills was 121 mm (4.75 in) long and 58 mm (2.3 in) in diameter filled with just over 57 g (2 oz) of explosive filler: Alumatol, (Note: A mixture of Ammonium nitrate, trinitrotoluene, and aluminium powder.) Ammonal, Baratol, Bellite, (Note: Essentially a mixture of ammonium nitrate and meta-dinitrobenzene that was used as explosive for coal mining.) Cilferite, (Note: A mixture of ammonium nitrate, ferrosilicon (also giving Cilferite its name), aluminium powder, and powdered wood.) Sabulite, (Note: An explosive containing ammonium nitrate, trinitrotoluene, and calcium silicide.) or Trotyl, while the grenade body was coated inside and out with shellac to prevent rusting and chemical reactions with some fillers. Combat experience during WWI showed that the Trotyl and Amatol fillings used in France weren't suitable for the heat of Mesopotamia, which led to the development of the Baratol-filled No. 23M grenade. All Cilferite-filled grenades were declared unsafe to use and disposed of in 1932 and from 1936, Trotyl was no longer used as filler.

According to Mills's notes, the casing was grooved to make it easier for soldiers to grip the grenade with muddy hands, not as an aid to fragmentation; and experiments conducted during World War II conclusively proved that external serrations have no effect whatsoever in controlling fragmentation.

The Mills was a defensive grenade meant to be thrown from behind cover at a target in the open, wounding with fragmentation, as opposed to an offensive grenade, which does not fragment, relying on short-range blast effect to wound or stun the victim without endangering the thrower with fragments, which travel a much longer distance than blast.

Despite the designations and their traits, "defensive" grenades were frequently used offensively and vice versa. A competent thrower could manage 49 ft (15 m) with reasonable accuracy, but the grenade could throw lethal fragments farther than this. The British Home Guard were instructed that the throwing range of the No. 36 was about 30 yd (27 m) with a danger area of about 100 yd (91 m).

=== Identification marks ===
- A green band around the middle originally indicated an Amatol filling (1915–1920s), while it later indicated a Baratol or Trotyl filling (1920s–1970s).
- A pink band around the middle indicates an Ammonal or Alumatol filling. A red band around the base plug on the bottom indicated the detonator was already installed and that the grenade was live.
- Three red Xs along each side indicates that it is the waterproofed No.36M model.

=== Rifle grenade variant ===
==== Early versions ====
The Mills bomb was developed into a rifle grenade by attaching a metallic rod to its base. This rod-type rifle-grenade had an effective range of about 150 yards (140 m).

The operating procedure was to insert the Mills bomb rod down the barrel of a standard rifle, put a special blank cartridge (Ballistite cartridge) in the rifle's chamber, place the rifle stock on the ground, then pull the Mills bomb's safety pin, releasing the safety lever and immediately fire the rifle. If the soldier did not launch the grenade quickly, the grenade's fuse would time out and explode.

The British soon developed a simple cradle attached to the rifle's bayonet lug to hold the safety-lever in place and prevent accidental detonations. However, it was found that the repeated launching of rod-type grenades caused damage to the rifle's barrel, causing the middle to bulge out due to the prolonged pressure spike from driving the much heavier, larger projectile up the barrel (typically a much faster process than with a normal bullet); a rifle cartridge rapidly burns up all the available powder, which fills the volume behind the bullet with extremely high pressure gases (tens of thousands of PSI), the pressure rising as the bullet moves up the barrel, peaking at some point before the bullet leaves the muzzle.

With the much heavier grenade and rod, the cartridge had to accelerate a much heavier mass, which resulted in the powder burning up and the pressure peaking before the rod had got more than a part of the way up the barrel, putting peak pressure on sooner and sustaining it for longer.

==== Later versions ====
The British subsequently developed a cup-type launcher to replace the rod-type rifle-grenade. In this design, a can-shaped launcher was attached to the muzzle of the rifle and a gas check disc was screwed onto the base of the grenade before the grenade was placed in the launcher. The safety pin could then be removed as the launcher cup kept the safety-lever in place.

The operator inserted the ballistite cartridge into the rifle before setting the stock, angled on the ground to absorb the recoil of the weapon. When the cartridge was fired it pushed the grenade out of the cup releasing the lever. The cup-type launcher could launch the grenade about 200 yards (180 m).

Lee–Enfield rifles equipped with the cup launcher were sometimes modified with copper wire wrapped around the stock, to prevent the wood from splitting under the increased recoil.

If necessary, both the rod and the gas check grenade could be thrown as a standard hand-grenade. The cup discharger was typically on issue to the British Home Guard rather than the regular British Army.

== Variants ==
=== United Kingdom ===
- No. 5 − Original version introduced in 1915, a total of 33,168,367 grenades produced until 1917, when production was discontinued in favour of improved designs
- No. 23 Mk. I − A rifle grenade adaptation introduced in 1916, the base plug was strengthened and a hole was bored to accept a 140 mm (5.5 in) steel rod that was launched via a blank cartridge giving it a range of approximately 75 m (82 yd); over 29 million were produced until June 1917
- No. 23 Mk. II − Improved version with a modified fuse
- No. 23 Mk. III − A substantial redesign, with an enlarged filling hole slightly lower on the body, a recess for the arming lever, modified lever brackets, base plug changed for a better fit, plus additional improvements to the fuse and sealing
- No. 23M Mk. I − A modified No. 23 grenade for use in the Mesopotamian region with the Trotyl and Amatol fillings replaced with Baratol, and improved sealing against the elements during storage
- No. 23M Mk. II − 'Mesopotamian' variant of the No. 23 Mk. II
- No. 23M Mk. III − 'Mesopotamian' variant of the No. 23 Mk. III
- No. 36 − A slightly modified No. 23 Mk III to speed up production and featuring improved fusing. Introduced in May 1918, remained the standard British hand grenade until 1923, when it was replaced by the No. 36M
- No. 36M − A No. 36 modified for service in the Mesopotamian region. While it could be used as a rifle grenade, it was no longer used as such in 1945, but not declared obsolete until 1962. Replaced in the late 1960s by the L2A1 grenade, though it remained in British service as a training grenade until remaining stockpiles were expended

=== British Commonwealth ===
- Blast attachment Mk I − A can almost twice the size of a No. 36M filled with TNT that was attached to the bottom of a regular grenade for attacking fortifications, it was issued to Australian troops
- Blast bomb Mk II − Australian design similar to the Blast attachment Mk I, but filled with Amatol
- India − Made No. 36Ms with instantaneous fuzes painted red for use as booby traps. The top of the cap chamber was knurled so soldiers could identify it at night. A tag warns users that 'This grenade MUST NOT be fired from a rifle or thrown by hand'
- Pakistan − Produced post-war No .36M grenades with a TNT filling instead of Baratol until the 1980s

== Adoption ==
=== WWI and interwar ===
The Mills bomb was adopted by the British Army as its standard hand grenade in 1915 as the No. 5. According to Ian V. Hogg, the No. 5 and No. 23 were withdrawn from service in 1918, while the No. 36 was declared obsolete in 1936. All Cilferite-filled grenades were declared as unsafe and disposed of by the end of 1932.

Ian V. Hogg also mentions that as early as 1916, the British were trying to develop a replacement for the Mills bomb, the No. 54 until development was halted in 1935 and the Army retained the combat-proven No. 36M. It was not until the late 1960s that a replacement was approved, the L2A1 grenade. The 36M remained in sporadic production until 1972.

=== WWII ===
At first the grenade was fitted with a seven-second fuse but in the Battle of France in 1940 this delay proved to be too long, giving defenders time to escape the explosion, or even to throw the grenade back. Therefore, the delay was reduced to four seconds.

The British Army continued to use grenades with a seven-second fuse for use in rifle mounted grenade projectors where the fuse time was required to allow the grenade to reach its full range.

=== Post-WWII ===
After the Second World War, Britain adopted grenades that contained segmented coiled wire in smooth metal casings.

The No. 36M Mk.I remained the standard grenade of the British Armed Forces and was manufactured in the UK until 1972, when it was replaced by the L2 series.

The 36M remained in service in some parts of the world such as India and Pakistan, where it was manufactured until the 2000s.

Mills bombs were still being used in combat as recently as 2004, for example in the incident which killed US Marine Jason Dunham and wounded two of his comrades.

The last major operator of the Mills bomb was India who only replaced it in August 2021 with a new Multi-Mode Hand Grenade (MMHG).

== Users ==
- Australia − Produced locally until 1972
- Belgium
- Canada − Produced locally
- Finland
- Free France
- Nazi Germany − Issued to saboteurs in Italy by the Abwehr
- Kingdom of Greece
- India − Produced locally until the 1980s
- Indonesia − Produced locally until the 1980s
- Italian resistance movement
- New Zealand − Produced locally
- Pakistan − Produced locally until the 1980s
- (Second Polish Republic) Polish Armed Forces in the West − Used in France and Italy
- Rhodesia − No. 36, replaced by the South African-made M962 grenade
- South Africa
- United Kingdom − Produced until 1972
- United States − Used in WWI and at the Battle of Buna–Gona in WWII
- Yugoslav Partisans

== Gallery ==
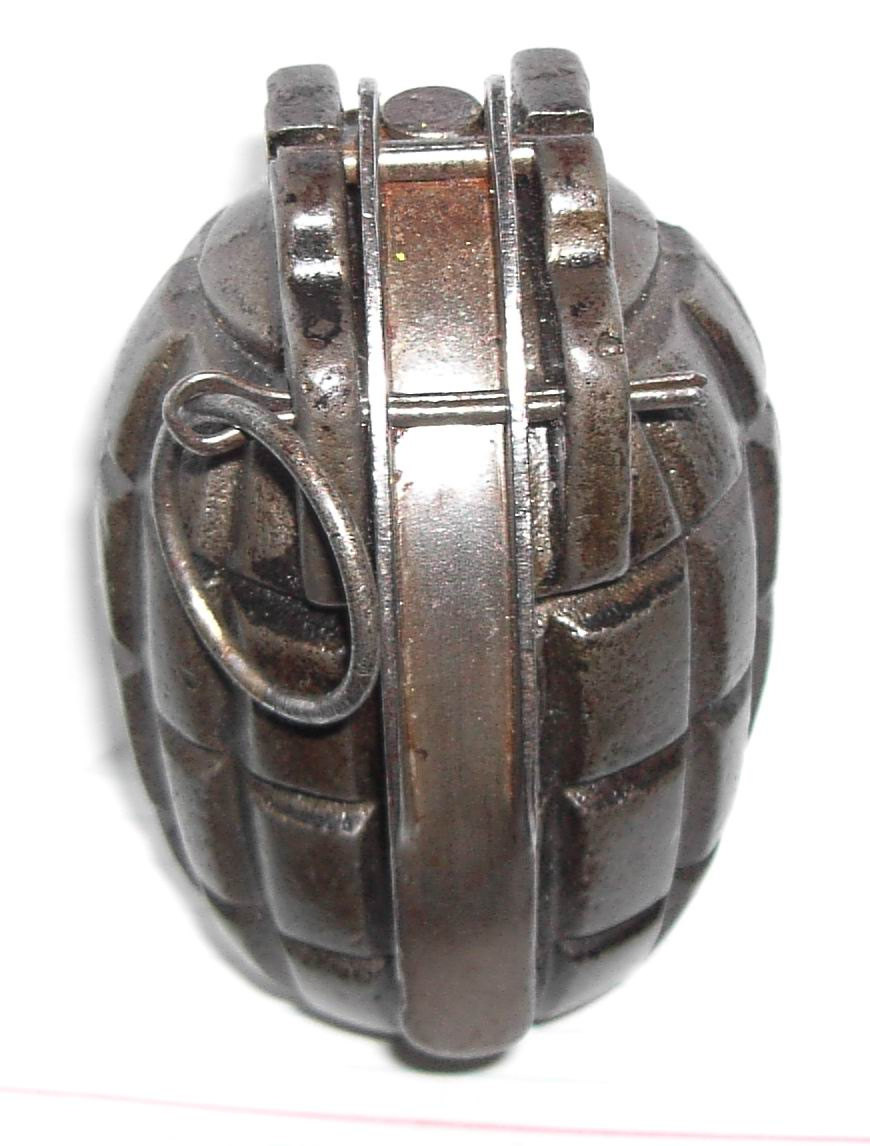
No. 5 Mk II Mills bomb

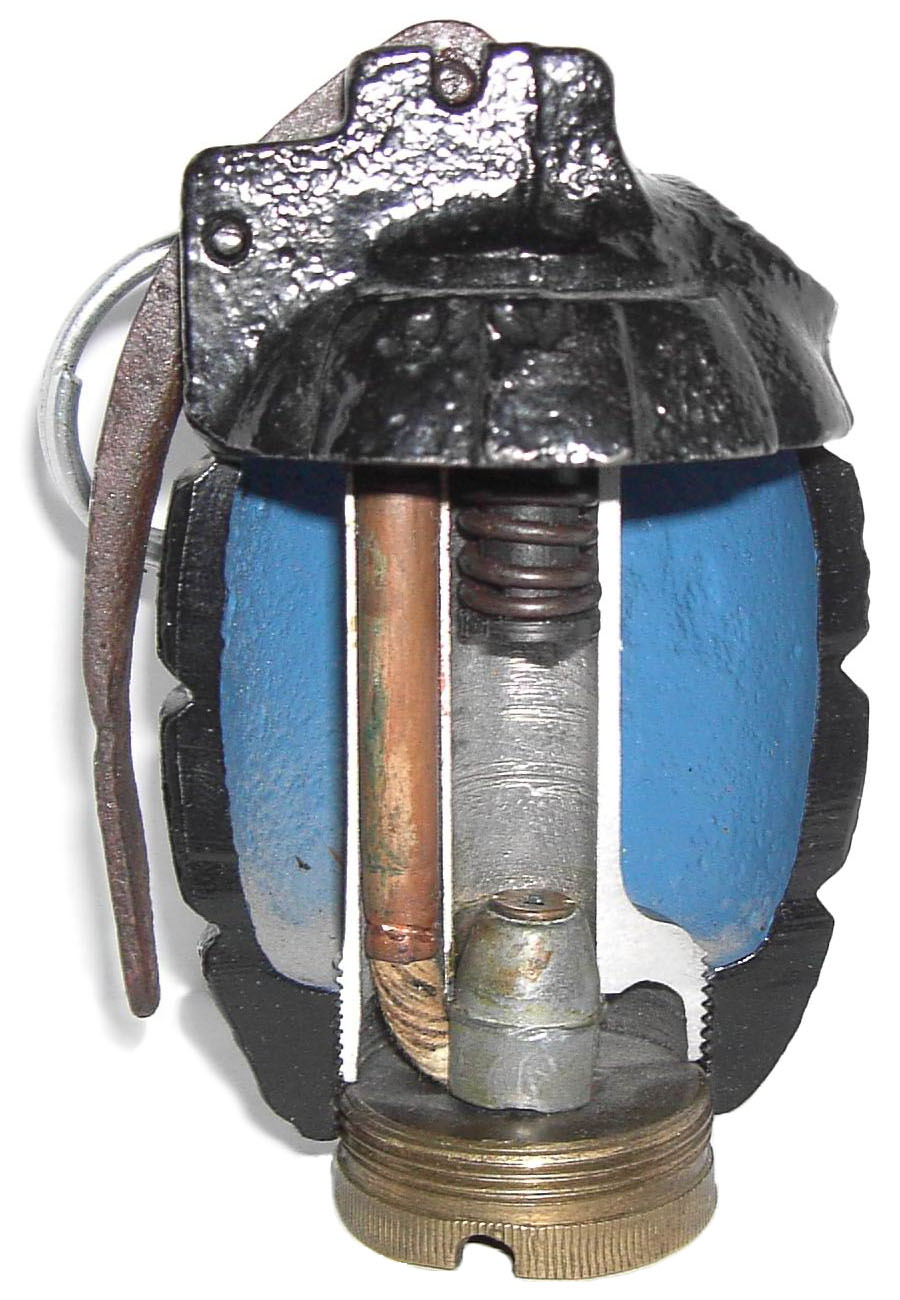
Cutaway view of a No. 5 Mills bomb

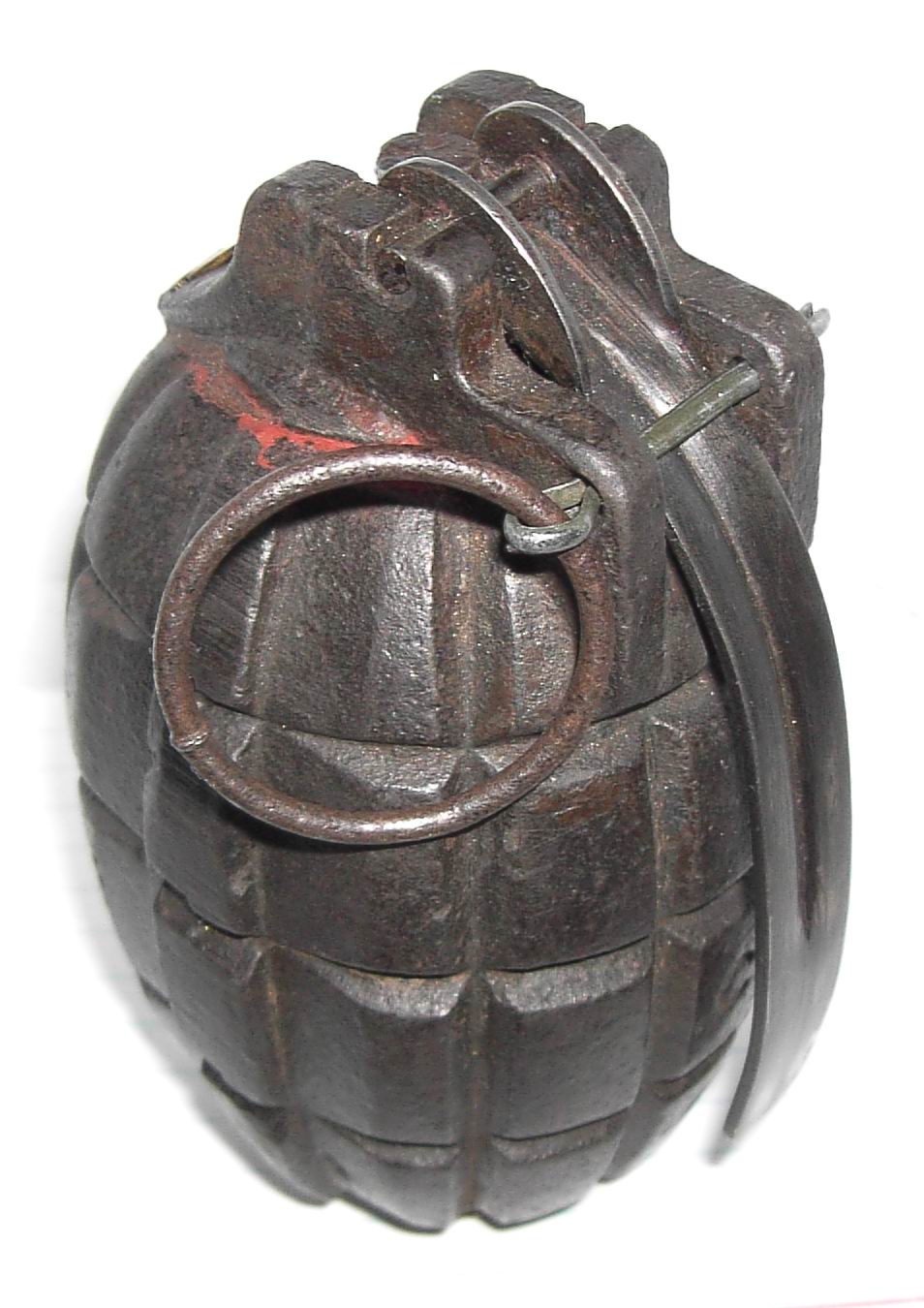
No. 23 Mk II Mills bomb

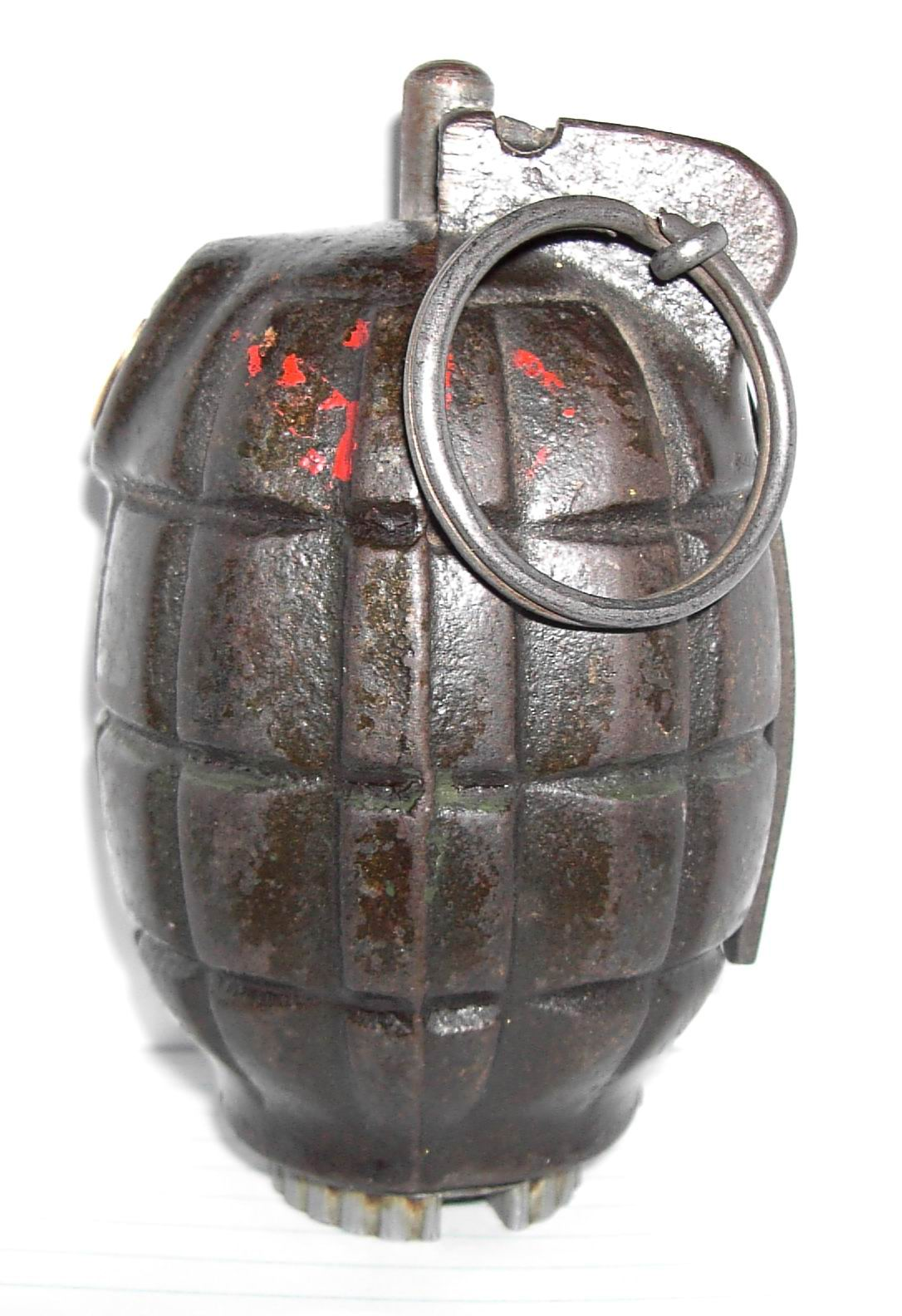
36M grenade dated 1940

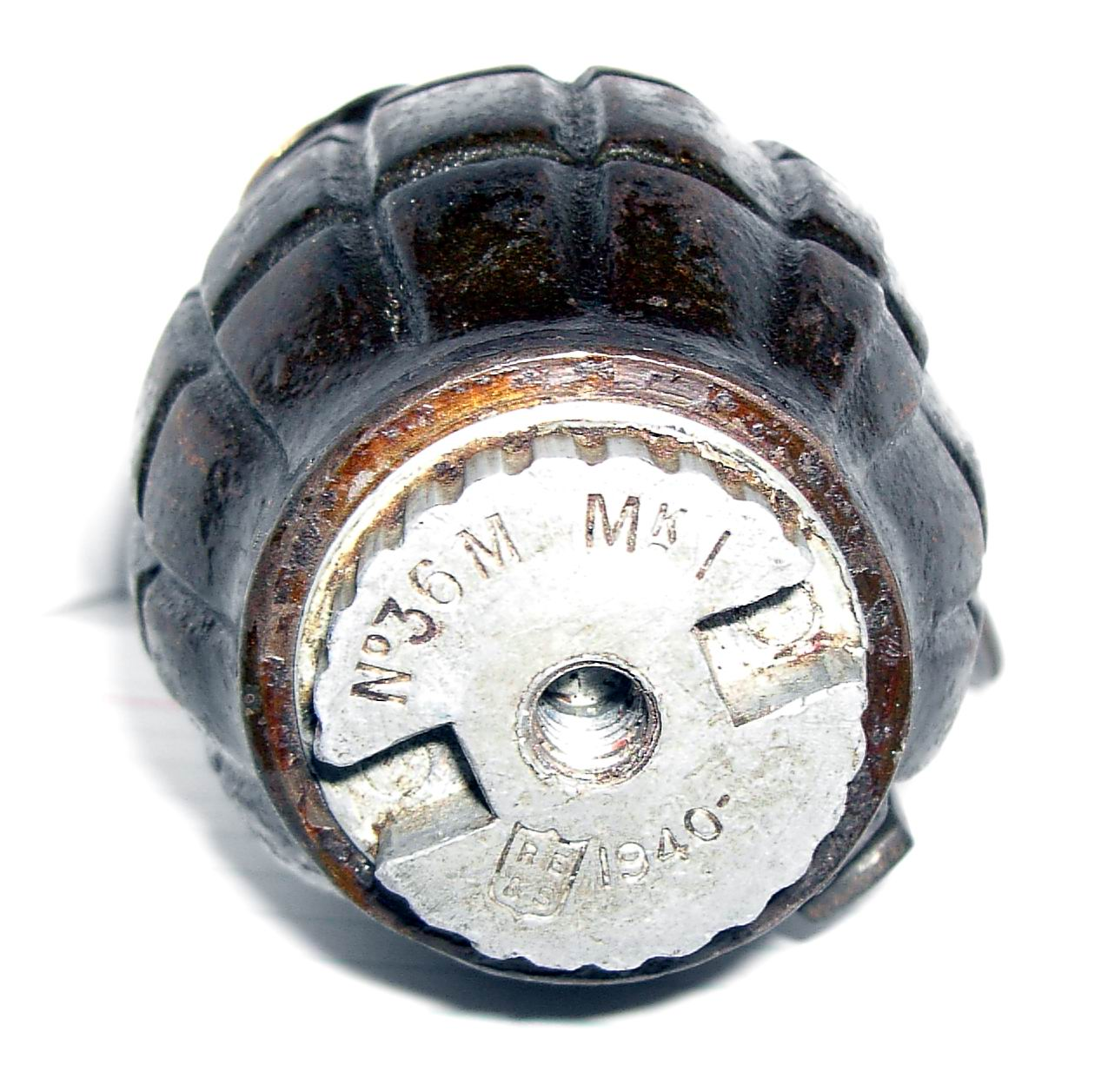
Base of 36M grenade dated 1940

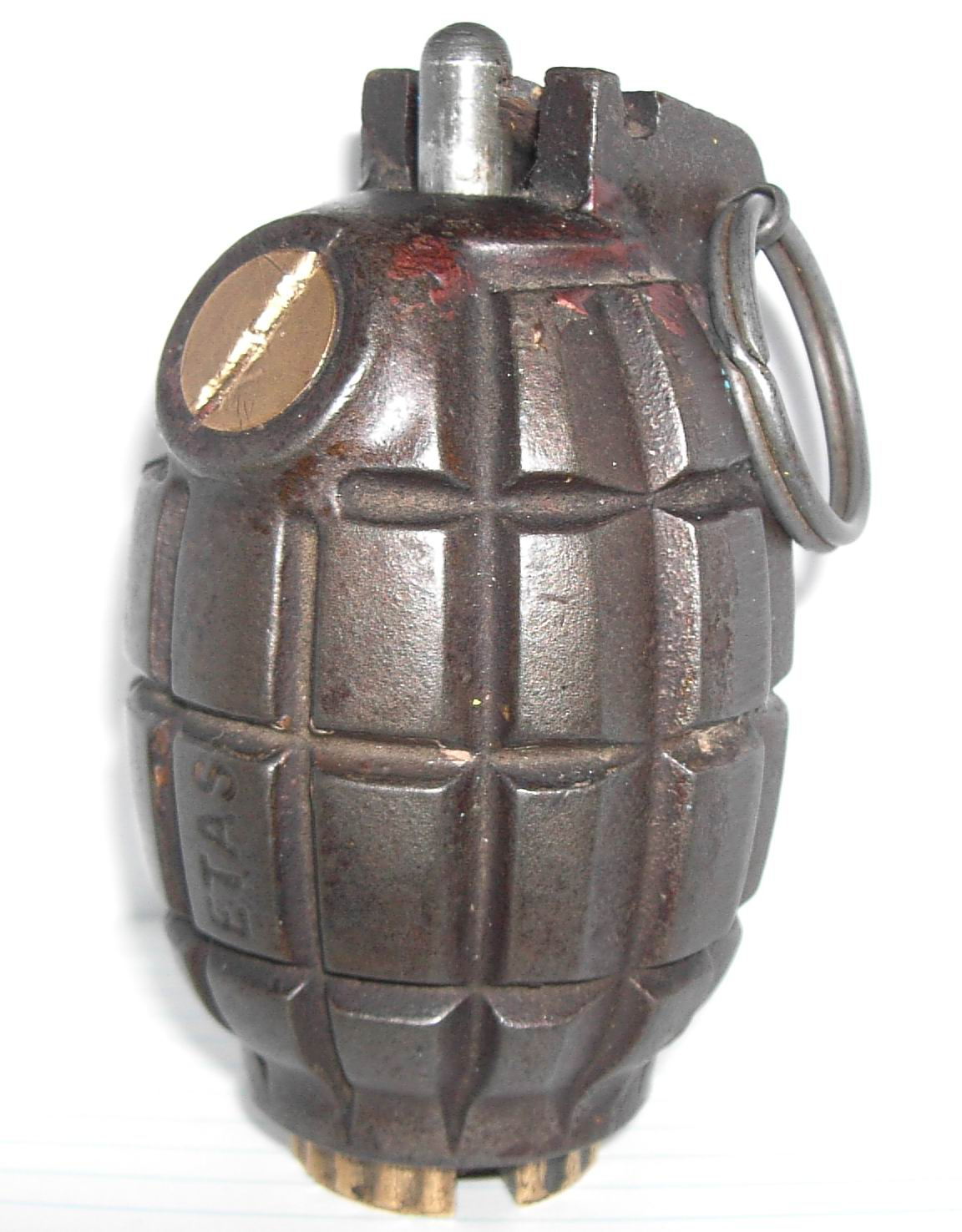
36M Mills bomb

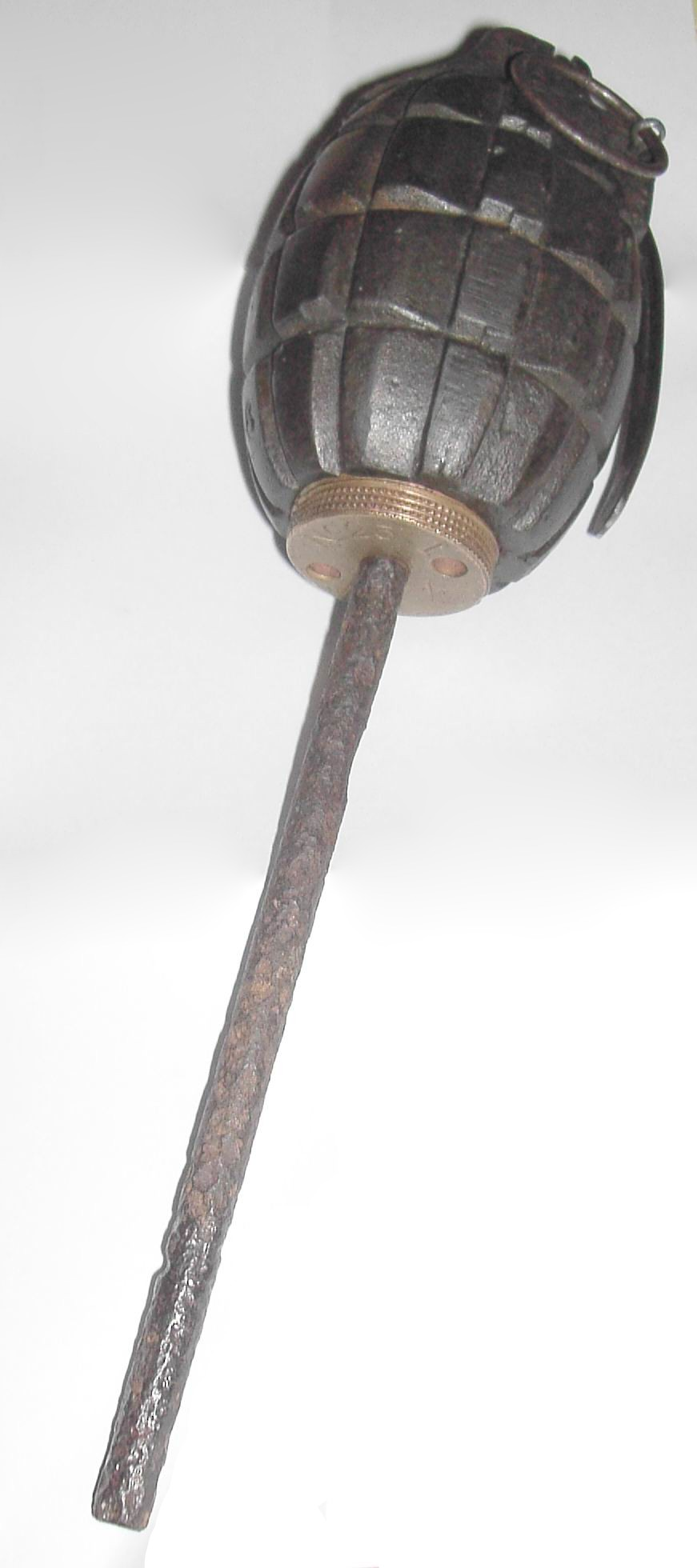
Mills bomb No. 23 Mk II, with rod for launch by rifle

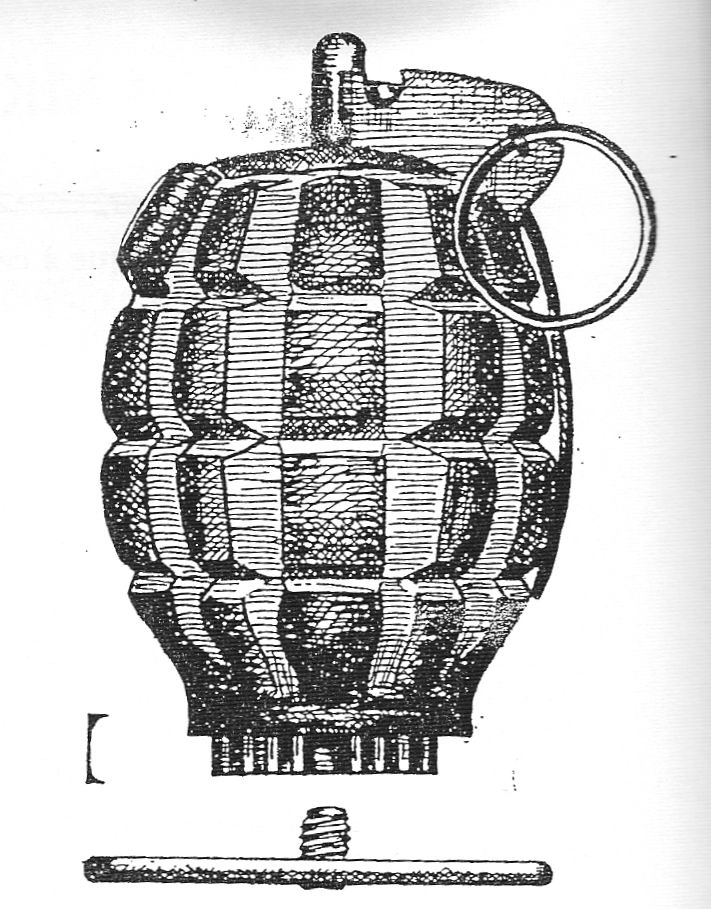
Drawing of the Mills No. 36 rifle grenade, with its gascheck disk for use with cup-launcher

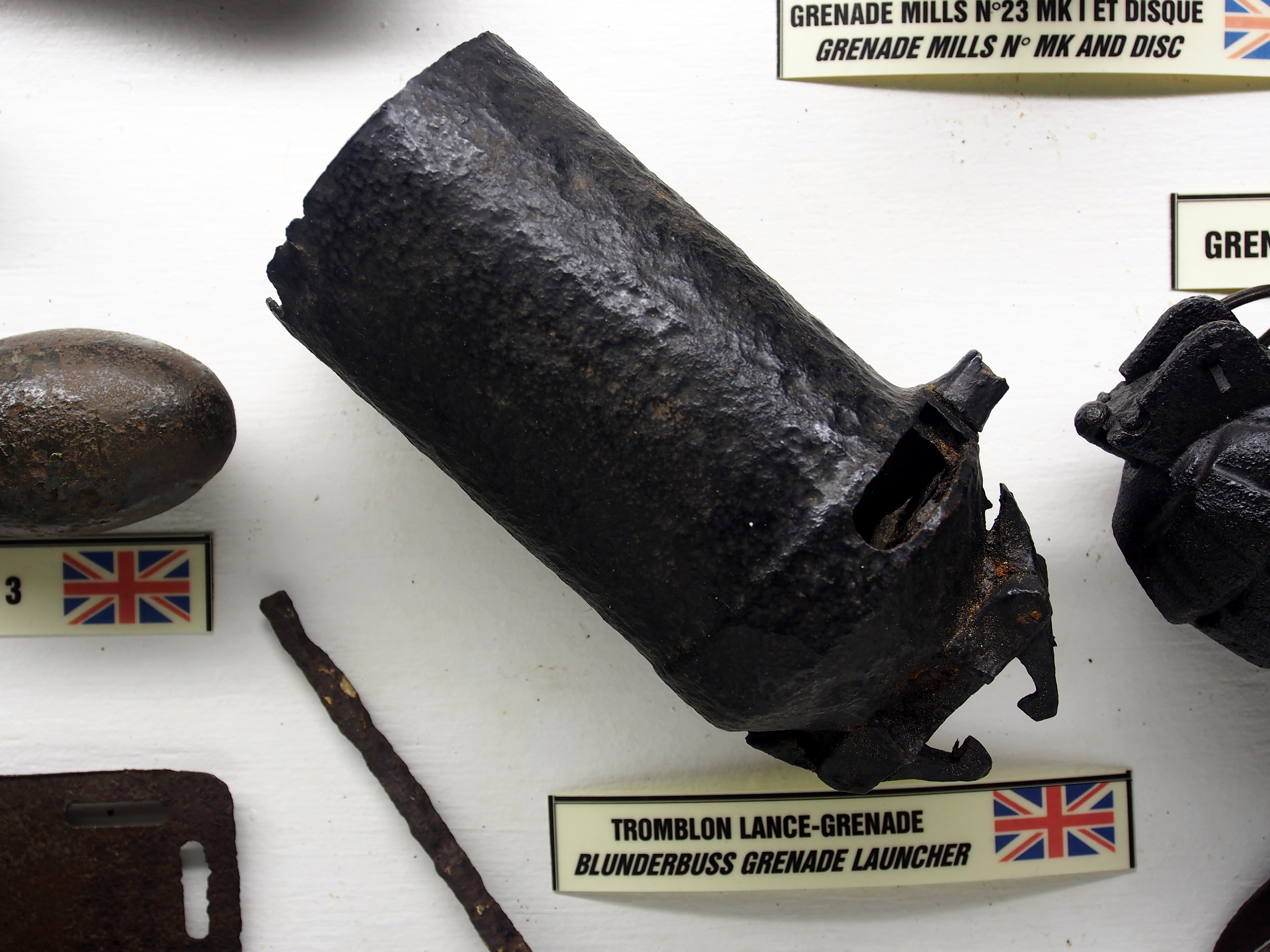
Lee-Enfield cup-launcher in the 1916 Somme Battlefield Museum, France

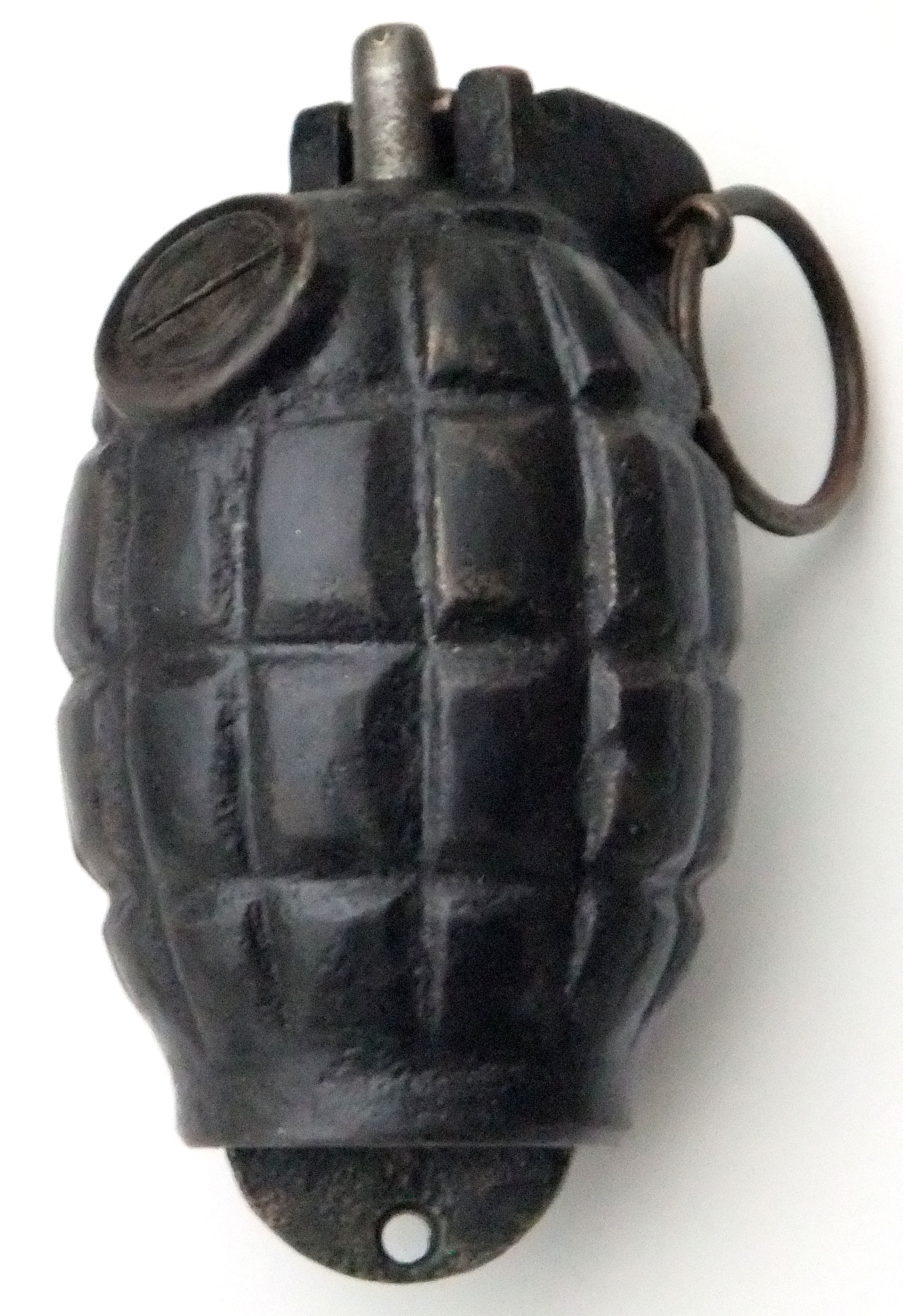
A case of derived type with special base plug

== See also ==
- Kugelhandgranate
- Stielhandgranate
- F1 grenade (France)
