= Thomas E. Wilson =

American businessman (1868-1958)

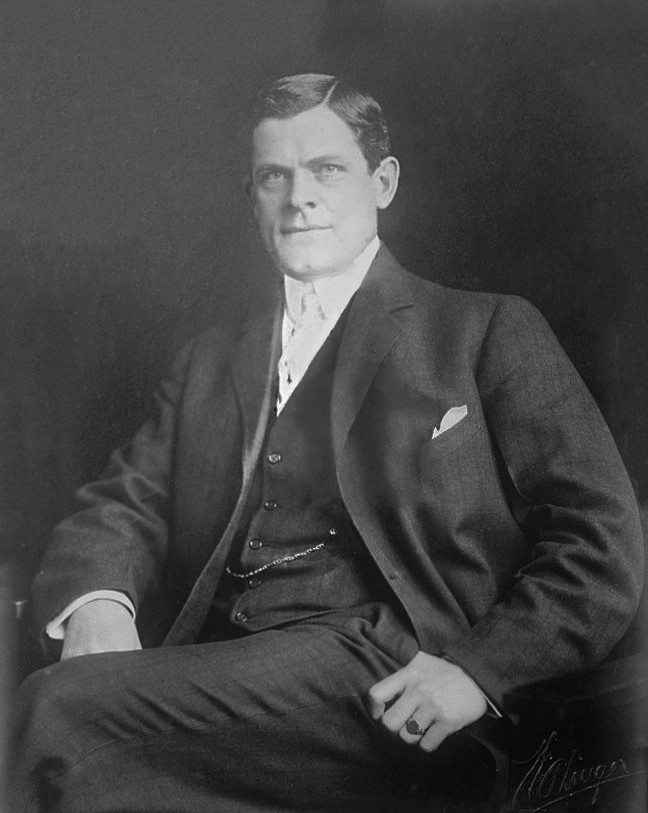
- Born: July 22, 1868; London, Ontario, Canada
- Died: August 4, 1958 (aged 90); Lake Forest, Illinois, U.S.
- Known for: Wilson Sporting Goods, Wilson and Company

Thomas E. Wilson (July 11, 1868 – August 4, 1958) was a Canadian-born American businessman. In 1926, he created one of the most recognizable sports brand names in the world, known as Wilson Sporting Goods. He served as President and Chairman of the Board of Wilson & Co for 35 years.

== Early life ==
Thomas Edward Wilson was born on a farm near London, Ontario, Canada, on July 22, 1868 to Scottish parents, Moses and Mary Ann Wilson (née Higgins). He was one of eight children. The family immigrated to the United States when Thomas was nine years old, settling in Chicago, Illinois. As a young man, he worked as a railroad car checker in the city’s bustling stockyards.

== Career ==
Wilson spent 25 years working his way up the ranks of Morris & Co, becoming Vice-President of the packing house in 1906, and president in 1913 following the death of its founder, Edwin Morris. In 1916, bankers succeeded in luring Wilson away from Morris & Company, in order to run a failing New York-based meat packer Sulzberger & Sons. Originally founded by Ferdinand Sulzberger 1853 as Schwartzchild & Sulzberger, it was often called S&S for short.

Wilson renamed the firm eponymously as Wilson & Co., Inc. on July 27, 1916, and moved its headquarters to Chicago's Union Stock Yards. It soon joined Armour and Swift at the top of the U.S. meat industry.

From 1916 until the 1950s Thomas Wilson built the company rapidly into one of 50 largest industrial corporations in the United States. Wilson was an important influence on the branding of processed meat foods, having developed many of today's popular value added beef and pork products. Wilson & Company was responsible for introducing numerous well-known brands, such as Wilson Certified Hams, Wilson's Continental Deli and Wilson's Corn King. He was an important figure in both the American Meat Institute and in the sporting goods industry. He was a leader of the national 4H program and breeder of shorthorn cattle.

In a real estate transaction in the 1920s, Wilson & Co. bought the Ashland Manufacturing Company, including its inventory of sporting goods products. The contents were offered to Spalding, among others. There was insufficient interest by buyers, so Wilson & Co. decided to enter the business on its own. The subsidiary was called Wilson Sporting Goods, and was eventually spun off into an independent company, which continues to do business in 2022.

After Wilson's death, in the 1960s Wilson & Co. taken private by conglomerate LTV Corporation., LTV later the sporting goods division to WESRAY, with successive buyers PEPSI and AMER GROUP.

== Civic awards ==
In 1946, Wilson received the United States government's Medal for Merit from President Harry S. Truman for his services to the U.S. economy during World War II.

== Death ==
Wilson died at age 90 in Illinois on August 4, 1958.

== Personal life ==
He married Elizabeth L. Foss on November 1, 1899. The couple had two children, a son and a daughter.

An archive of Wilson's personal papers exists at the Special Collections Research Center of the University of Chicago Library.
