= Duncan MacDougall =

Duncan MacDougall may refer to:

- Duncan MacDougall, Donnchadh of Argyll (died 1240s), Scottish noble
- Duncan MacDougall (British Army officer) (1787–1862), British Army officer
- Duncan Peck MacDougall (1909–1990), American explosives scientist
- Duncan MacDougall (doctor) (c. 1866–1920), American doctor
