= William Mills (inventor) =

British inventor (1856–1932)

Sir William Mills
- Sir William Mills
- Born: 24 April 1856; Wear Street, Southwick, Sunderland, England
- Died: 7 January 1932 (aged 76); Weston-super-Mare, Somerset, England
- Relatives: Wife (died 1930)
- Military career
- Awards: A Knighthood and a Gold Medal from the Mercantile Marine Service Association.

Sir William Mills (24 April 1856 – 7 January 1932) was an English engineer. He invented the Mills bomb, which was developed and manufactured at his factory in Birmingham, England.

The Mills bomb was the hand grenade most widely used by British and Imperial forces during the First World War. He was knighted in 1922.

A blue heritage plaque and Mills Bomb artwork commemorating Sir William Mills' achievements are placed on The Times Inn public house in Wear Street, Low Southwick, Sunderland, SR5 2BH. He was born here in 1856.

During and after the First World War, he resided in East Boldon on Front Street. Notable places near this area include: East Boldon Cenotaph, East Boldon Methodist Church, The Black Bull Public House and Brewery

== Early life ==
William Mills was born on 26 April 1856 in Wear Street, Southwick, Sunderland. He was the son of David Mills, a shipbuilder, and his wife Sarah Ann Kirkaldy.

The Sunderland historian James Watson Corder recorded that David Mills had an interest in the Sunderland-based Mills shipbuilding firm, however it was run by his brothers George and John.

By 1871, William Mills and his family had moved to 22 Camden Street, Sunderland. David Mills was recorded as a joiner in the Census taken that year. William was a butcher, however he soon switched careers and began a seven-year apprenticeship with George Clarke, the famous Marine Engineers of Sunderland.

After completing his apprenticeship, Mills spent seven years at sea, obtaining a first class Certificate as a Marine Engineer in 1884.

During his time at sea Mills witnessed great loss of life caused by the unsafe engaging and disengaging methods used on ship lifeboats. The experience prompted him to invent a simple, safe and efficient method, which was first exhibited at the Liverpool Shipowners' Exhibition in 1886. Mills was awarded a gold medal by the Mercantile Marine Service's Association for his efforts, as well as an Exhibition Gold Medal. The Board of Trade quickly approved his design and it came into worldwide use in both naval and merchant vessels.

== Down to business ==
After leaving the sea, Mills went into business as a General Engineer in Sunderland in 1885, when he established the first Aluminium foundry in the United Kingdom at The Atlas Works, Bonnersfield. Monkwearmouth.

Whilst here he produced some of Britain's earliest aluminium golf clubs: Patent, No 13545. known as Metallic Golfing Instrument Heads. He was a keen golfer and had joined the Wearside Golf Club in around 1892.

Apart from his company in Sunderland, Mills also set up a company in Birmingham of the same name, which produced castings for the motor car and aircraft industries.

== His bombs ==
Early in 1915, Mills opened the Mills Munitions Factory in Birmingham, making the Mills Bomb Hand Grenade. Until then, grenades had often proved as deadly to the thrower as to the intended target. The first grenade used when war broke out in 1914 was a cast-iron canister on an 18-inch stick, which was dangerous to use because it often caught on the trench front when lobbed.

Mills carried out extensive research into common design faults and came up with his own grenade, which had a central spring-loaded firing-pin and spring-loaded lever locked by a pin. A four-second time fuse allowed the thrower to take cover before it exploded. His bombs were used exclusively and successfully by the British and other Allies throughout the war and 75,000,000 were supplied. His services were rewarded by a Knighthood in 1922.

== Other inventions ==
Besides the hand grenade and golf clubs, Mills was also the inventor of the Patent Instantaneous Engaging and Disengaging Gear for Ships and Boats. It was used worldwide and had a great reputation for efficiency and for life saving. Another of his inventions was a telescopic walking stick seat.

Mills was an active member of the Executive of the Birmingham Chamber of Commerce, Chairman of the James Watt Centenary Committee and, in his spare time, a collector of pictures, china and antiques.

== Arms ==
Coat of arms of William Mills
Notes Granted 4 December 1923 (ref:91/181) Crest On a wreath of the colours issuant from the battlements of a tower a dexter hand grasping and in the act of throwing a Mills' hand grenade all Proper. Escutcheon Azure a mill-rind Or on a chief Argent three mills' hand grenades Proper. Motto Fortissima Veritas
