= Vera Kistiakowsky =

American physicist (1928–2021)

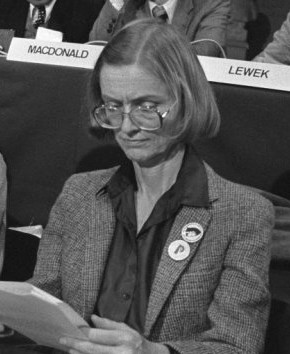
- Vera Kistiakowsky (1981)
- Born: September 9, 1928; Princeton, New Jersey, U.S.
- Died: December 11, 2021 (aged 93); Providence, Rhode Island, U.S.
- Education: Mount Holyoke College; University of California, Berkeley
- Parent: George Kistiakowsky
- Scientific career
- Fields: Physics
- Workplaces: Massachusetts Institute of Technology
- Thesis: A study of the isotopes of promethium
- Doctoral advisor: Glenn Seaborg

Vera Kistiakowsky (September 9, 1928 – December 11, 2021) was an American research physicist, teacher, and arms control activist. She was professor emerita at Massachusetts Institute of Technology in the physics department and Laboratory for Nuclear Science, and was an activist for women's participation in the sciences. Kistiakowsky was an expert in experimental particle physics and observational astrophysics. Her hobbies included climbing mountains, and she liked to maintain an energetic and fit lifestyle. She was the first woman appointed MIT professor of physics in 1972.

== Education and family ==
Kistiakowsky was born in Princeton, New Jersey in 1928. She was the daughter of physical chemist George Kistiakowsky, who taught at Harvard and served as President Dwight D. Eisenhower's science adviser. Her mother, Hildegard Moebius, was the daughter of a Lutheran pastor and she went to school in Berlin to get her M.D. However, she never got her M.D, and instead worked as a technician and supported medical units on the front lines of World War I. Kistiakowsky's early education in the sciences was greatly influenced by her father. He made special arrangements so that she could spend summers in Los Alamos with him where he was working on the Manhattan Project. During this time she was also attending Mount Holyoke College where "she excelled in chemistry and math, just like her father. 'I thought very highly of my father,' says Vera. 'He told me very seriously that I should find something to do that would support me and not rely on getting married and finding someone who would support me.'"

She earned her A.B. in chemistry from Mount Holyoke College in 1948 and a Ph.D. in chemistry from the University of California, Berkeley in 1952. After earning her Ph.D. in 1952, specializing in promethium isotopes at the University of California, Berkeley, she transitioned to experimental nuclear physics during her postdoctoral fellowship with Luis Alvarez. She married Gerhard Fischer, a fellow student at the University of California, Berkeley, in 1951, and had two children.

== Career ==
Kistiakowsky's professional career began in the nuclear chemistry field, later moving to nuclear physics, and then particle physics, and finally astrophysics. She worked at Columbia University from 1954–1959, first as a research fellow in chemistry, assisting a nuclear chemist; she then found support to become a research associate in the physics department assisting Chien-Shiung Wu. Kistiakowsky and her family moved to Cambridge, Massachusetts when her husband got a job at Cambridge Electron Accelerator. She then worked at Brandeis University for a short time as an assistant professor before starting work at MIT in 1963. At MIT she began her career as a staff member of the MIT Laboratory for Nuclear Science where she worked from 1963 to 1969. She was senior research scientist in the MIT Department of Physics from 1969 to 1971.

In 1972 she was the first woman appointed MIT professor of physics. Still, at MIT’s Laboratory for Nuclear Science, Vera demonstrated a passionate commitment to addressing gender disparities within the scientific community. She co-founded WISE (Women in Science and Engineering), with two colleagues, Elizabeth Baranger and Vera Pless, which advocated for women scientists and developed a committee within the American Physical Society to address gender equality further.

Kistiakowsky published more than 70 scientific papers during her career, covering experimental nuclear physics, experimental high-energy particle physics, and later astrophysics. Her early research included measurements of promethium isotopes, work that formed part of her doctoral research at the University of California, Berkeley. In a 1952 paper in Physical Review, she reported measurements of the half-lives and radiation characteristics of several promethium isotopes, including promethium-141, -142, -143, -144, -146, -149, and -150. She subsequently conducted nuclear-physics research at Columbia University, including a 1955 study of metastable states in several isotopes produced by proton bombardment. Later in her career, she moved into observational astrophysics, studying astronomical sources including supernovae and planetary nebulae.

== Committee and organization work ==
In 1969 she co-founded the Boston area group Women in Science and Engineering (WISE), a precursor to the Boston chapter of the Association for Women in Science (AWIS). Kistiakowsky served as chair or member on numerous MIT committees and groups relating to women at MIT and affirmative action at MIT, including the Women's Forum, and the Ad Hoc Committee on the Role of Women at MIT. In 1971 she founded the American Physical Society (APS) Committee on the Status of Women in Physics, securing a US$10,000 Sloan Foundation grant to produce a questionnaire on women's conditions of employment. The committee also created a roster of female physicists, "to counter claims that there were no qualified ones to hire". The committee's two and a half inch report convinced the APS to establish the Committee on the Status of Women in Physics in 1972, a committee still working today.

Other committees that she has been involved in include the National Research Council Conference on Women in Science and Engineering, and the Association for Women in Science, Women in Science and Engineering.

As a result of Kistiakowsky's innovative work and strong leadership, the Association for Women in Science elected her president in 1982 and 1983. She brought attention to the difficulties faced by women in science through speeches and writings. Her fellowships in the American Physical Society and the American Association for the Advancement of Science attest to her lasting influence. Her advocacy of these programs has made science a more open field and served as an inspiration for later generations of women in STEM.

Kistiakowsky's campaign for female equality in the sciences has had a lasting effect, even though her individual scientific inventions may not have resulted in a physical product or technology still in use today. More women are represented in scientific professions due to the awareness she created and the organizations she helped build. Her transformation continues to influence policy, provoke thought, and motivate action, resulting in a scientific community that is more equal and diverse.

Kistiakowsky died on December 11, 2021.

== Selected publications ==
- An Outlook Book about Atomic Energy, Publication: Oliver and Boyd, 1963
- One Way is Down: A Book about Gravity, Publication: Little, Brown, 1967
