= Alexander Kistiakowsky =

Oleksandr Bohdanovych Kistiakivskyi (Ukrainian: Олександр Богданович Кістяківський; 13 August 1904 – 22 June 1983) was a Ukrainian ornithologist and a specialist on bird lice. He was a brother of physical chemist George Kistiakowsky. His contributions to ornithology included ideas on navigation by migrating birds, the mechanics of bird flight, and the publication of several regional avifaunas.

Oleksandr was born in Khatky, Poltava. Oleksandr's father Bohdan was a lawyer, philosopher, sociologist, and a professor at the University of Kyiv. Bohdan's father, Oleksandr, was also a renowned professor of Criminal Law at the University of Kyiv. A leftist revolutionary, Bohdan died in 1920. Oleksandr had three siblings, one died in Poland, while two others became scientists. George fled to Germany and influenced by his uncle Volodymyr Kistiakivskyi, a pioneer in electrochemistry, studied physics and chemistry. He moved to the US in 1926 and joined Harvard University, heading a department in the Los Alamos National Laboratory from 1944 to 1945. At the age of fifteen, Oleksandr became interested in birds and insects and worked as an assistant at the Zoological Museum of the Kyiv Academy of Sciences. In the 1920s he travelled on several natural history expeditions and lived in the richly furnished apartment of his parents. He worked at the museum and studied the Mallophaga. He then worked on biological pest control.

In 1941, he was drafted into the 2nd Ukrainian Front. He was posted in a unit to defend a bridge but this was destroyed by the Germans. He received several military awards and later learned that this bridge in the south was deliberately made a target for the Germans while a bridge in the north was used by the Soviets to liberate Kyiv.

He returned from the war to continue research at the University of Kyiv in 1946. Discovering that his wife had, during the war, sold off his parents' apartment including antique paintings to Germans, along with loss of his manuscripts, he divorced her. He later married an assistant at the university and they lived in a small apartment. He became a lecturer, was promoted to professor in 1961 and shortly after became head of the zoology department in the Shevchenko University, Kyiv.

A Ukrainian patriot, he was not in support of the communist government of the time and therefore did not find favour within the higher ranks of the university or government. In the 1960s the USSR under Nikita Khrushchev was in diplomatic talks with the United States of America and a delegation of American scholars including George Kistiakowsky were due to visit. George wished to meet his brother at his home in Kyiv. The officials did not like the idea of his being seen in a small apartment clogged with books and Oleksandr was surprised to receive a letter allocating a large three-room apartment. After more than 40 years the brothers met. George then invited Oleksandr to the United States but the travel documents took long to obtain. After boarding a ship at Odesa, he was told that his documents were not in order and the KGB stopped him from travel, and believed that he was going to defect. Oleksandr subsequently swore never to travel abroad. In 1981, under Leonid Brezhnev, the travel restrictions were removed and Oleksandr visited his brother in the United States for three weeks during which time he was also able to meet the ornithologist Ernst Mayr.

His wish was that after his death, his ashes be scattered into the river Dnipro. His friends found this a difficult proposal and fulfilled his wishes by sprinkling ashes from the urn onto a big wreath and then placing the wreath in the river while the empty urn was buried in his grave.
