= Medal for Merit =

American civilian decoration (1942–1952)

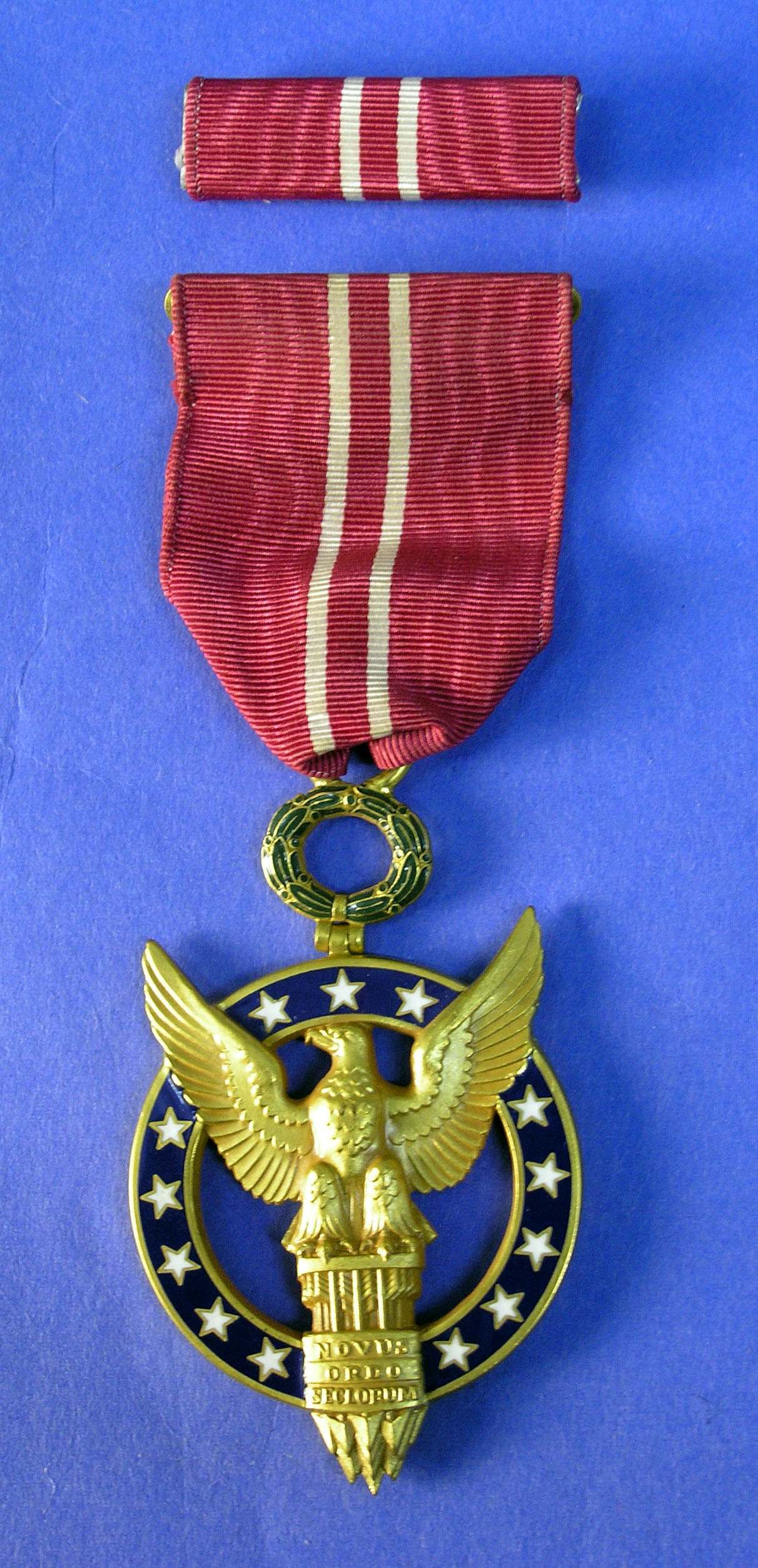
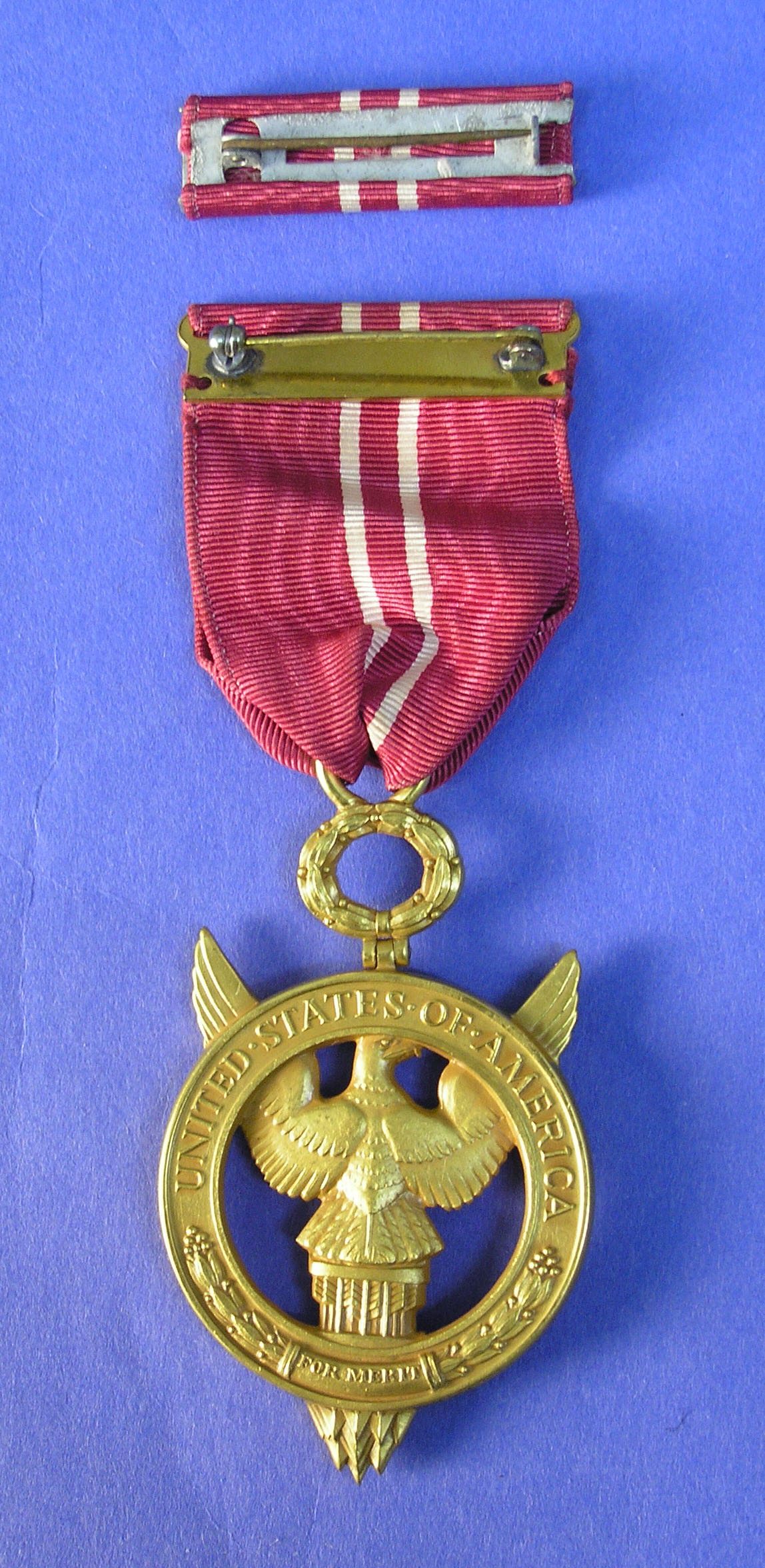
- Obverse and reverse of the Medal for Merit
- Type: Single grade decoration
- Awarded for: Exceptionally meritorious conduct in the performance of outstanding services during World War II
- Country: United States
- Presented by: President of the United States
- Eligibility: Civilians of the United States and allied nations
- Status: No longer awarded
- Established: 20 July 1942
- First award: 28 March 1944
- Final award: 1952
- Ribbon bar of the medal

Precedence
- Next (higher): None (At the time of its awarding)
- Next (lower): Medal of Freedom

The Medal for Merit was the highest civilian decoration of the United States in the gift of the president. Created during World War II, it was awarded by the president of the United States to civilians who "distinguished themselves by exceptionally meritorious conduct in the performance of outstanding services" in the war effort "since the proclamation of an emergency by the President on September 8, 1939". Awards to civilians of foreign nations were eligible "only for the performance of exceptionally meritorious or courageous act or acts in furtherance of the war efforts of the United Nations." It was last awarded in 1952.

The medal is made of gold-finished bronze and enamel and is worn on the left chest from a ribbon.

== History ==
The Medal for Merit was created by Public Law 77-671 and its awarding codified by Executive Order 9286 – Medal for Merit on 24 December 1942, later amended and restated by Executive Order 9857A of 27 May 1947. Created during World War II, and awarded to "civilians of the nations prosecuting the war under the joint declaration of the United Nations and of other friendly foreign nations", the medal has not been awarded since 1952.

The first medals were awarded to John C. Garand and Albert Hoyt Taylor on 28 March 1944.

The Medal for Merit is seventh in order of precedence of U.S. civilian decorations, below the Silver Lifesaving Medal and above the National Intelligence Distinguished Service Medal.

Civilians of foreign nations could receive the award for the performance of an exceptionally meritorious or courageous act or acts in furtherance of the war efforts of the Allies against the Axis powers. The first person to receive this medal who was not an American citizen was Sir Edward Wilfred Harry Travis Director of the British Government Code and Cypher School in World War II, on 12 January 1946. The next foreign civilian to receive the medal was Edgar Sengier, the director of the Belgian Union Minière du Haut Katanga during World War II. Sengier was awarded the Medal for Merit on 9 April 1946. The next foreign civilian to receive the medal was the Canadian spymaster William Stephenson in November 1946. Stephenson had the code name "Intrepid" during World War II. Some writers consider Stephenson to be one of the real life inspirations for the fictitious character "James Bond". Another recipient was Sir Robert Watson-Watt, a British pioneer of radar, who created a chain of radar stations around the UK which enabled advance information to be available to the Royal Air Force of incoming German aircraft and was instrumental in the winning of the 1940 Battle of Britain. He was sent to the US in 1941 to advise on air defense, after Japan's attack on Pearl Harbor. He was awarded the US Medal for Merit in 1946.

All proposed awards were considered by the Medal for Merit Board, consisting of three members appointed by the president, of whom one was appointed as the chairman of the board. This medal cannot be awarded for any action relating to the prosecution of World War II after the end of hostilities (as proclaimed by Proclamation No. 2714 of 31 December 1946), and no proposal for this award for such services could be submitted after 1947. The last medal of this type was awarded in 1952 after a long delay in processing.

== Notable recipients ==
- Dean Acheson (30 June 1947)
- Leason H. Adams (1948)
- Homer Burton Adkins (1948)
- Luis W. Alvarez (1947)
- James Gilbert Baker (1948)
- Chester I. Barnard
- Irving Berlin (1945)
- Patrick Blackett
- Barnett R. Brickner (1947)
- Vannevar Bush (27 May 1948)
- G. Edward Buxton Jr. (30 November 1946)
- Samuel H. Caldwell
- Arthur Compton (12 January 1946)
- Karl Taylor Compton (1946)
- James B. Conant (27 May 1948)
- Granville Conway (16 July 1947)
- Ralph K. Davies (1945)
- Albert de Vleeschauwer
- Joseph Desch (16 July 1947)
- Lee Alvin DuBridge (2 February 1948)
- Louis G. Dunn (21 March 1949)
- John R. Dunning (1946)
- William Frederick Durand (1946)
- Enrico Fermi (1946)
- Alexander Fleming
- Howard Florey (1948)
- William Alfred Fowler (2 February 1948)
- Edwin Broun Fred (1945)
- William F. Friedman (1946)
- Jack Frye (18 December 1946)
- John C. Garand (28 March 1944)
- Ivan A. Getting
- David T. Griggs (15 April 1946)
- Leroy Randle Grumman (1948)
- Gaylord P. Harnwell
- W. Averell Harriman (1946)
- Clarence N. Hickman (1948)
- J. Edgar Hoover (8 March 1946)
- Cordell Hull (15 April 1947)
- Jerome Clarke Hunsaker (1946)
- Frederick Vinton Hunt (1947)
- Mary Shotwell Ingraham (1946)
- Robert H. Jackson (7 February 1947)
- Louis Johnson (1 October 1947)
- Eric Johnston (1947)
- Al Jolson (1950)
- Ben Kanahele (1941)
- Paul E. Klopsteg (1948)
- Edward F. Knipling (1947)
- Frank Knox (31 May 1945)
- Harry C. Kramer (22 November 1946)
- Julius A. Krug (1 May 1946)
- William L. Langer (18 July 1946)
- Charles Christian Lauritsen (1948)
- Ernest Lawrence (1946)
- George William Lewis (1948)
- Alfred Lee Loomis
- Duncan Peck MacDougall (2 February 1948)
- William L. Marbury Jr. (late 1940s)
- Max Mason (2 February 1948)
- Thomas B. McCabe (1946)
- Paul V. McNutt (27 November 1946)
- George W. Merck (1946)
- Clark B. Millikan (21 March 1949)
- Robert A. Millikan (21 March 1949)
- Raymond D. Mindlin
- Henry Morgenthau Jr. (12 December 1945)
- Philip McCord Morse (December 1946)
- William Beverly Murphy (1946)
- Dillon S. Myer
- David K. Niles (20 August 1947)
- Brian O'Brien
- J. Robert Oppenheimer (1946)
- Linus Carl Pauling (2 February 1948)
- William D. Pawley (13 May 1946)
- Howard C. Petersen (1947)
- Byron Price (15 January 1946)
- I. I. Rabi (1948)
- Eddie Rickenbacker
- Richard B. Roberts (1947)
- Donald Roebling (1948)
- Samuel I. Rosenman (24 January 1946)
- A. P. Rowe (1947)
- Leonard Rowntree (1946)
- Edgar Sengier (9 April 1946)
- James Augustine Shannon (1948)
- Edward Raymond Sharp (1947)
- William Shockley (1946)
- Cyril Stanley Smith
- John Wesley Snyder (14 May 1947)
- William Stephenson (1946)
- Sir Reginald Stradling (1947)
- Julius Adams Stratton (1946)
- Herbert Bayard Swope (1947)
- Myron C. Taylor (20 December 1948)
- Albert Hoyt Taylor (28 March 1944)
- Frederick Emmons Terman
- Charles Allen Thomas (30 January 1946)
- Sir Edward Wilfred Harry Travis (12 January 1946)
- Juan T. Trippe (27 September 1946)
- Fred M. Vinson (3 October 1947)
- Theodore von Kármán (1946)
- John von Neumann (1947)
- Sir Robert Watson-Watt (1946)
- Thomas J. Watson Sr. (19 May 1947)
- Sidney James Weinberg (19 September 1946)
- Eugene Wigner (1946)
- Charles Erwin Wilson (1946)
- Thomas E. Wilson (1946)
- Stephen J. Zand

== See also ==
- President's Certificate of Merit
