= Committee on Science, Engineering, and Public Policy =

The Committee on Science, Engineering, and Public Policy (COSEPUP) is a committee of the United States National Academy of Sciences (NAS), the National Academy of Engineering (NAE), and the National Academy of Medicine (NAM). It is chartered by the Academies to address "the concerns and requests of the President's Science Advisor, the Director of the National Science Foundation, the Chair of the National Science Board, and heads of other federal research and development departments and agencies, and the Chairs of key science and technology-related committees of the Congress."
