= Baratol =

Explosive blend

Baratol is an explosive made of a mixture of TNT and barium nitrate, with about 1% of paraffin wax acting as a phlegmatizing agent. TNT typically makes up 25% to 33% of the mixture.

Baratol, which has a detonation velocity of only about 4,870 m/s (16,000 ft/s) (Note: For comparison, the fastest filler used in explosive lenses, HMX has a detonation velocity of 9,110 m/s (29,900 ft/s) at a pressed density of 1.89 g/cm^{3} (118 lb/cu ft).) at a cast density of 2.55 g/cm^{3} (159 lb/cu ft), was used as the slow-detonating explosive in the explosive lenses of implosion-type nuclear weapons, with Composition B often used as the fast-detonating component, including the United States Gadget and Fat Man bombs; the Soviet Union and India also reportedly used Baratol on the Joe 1 and Smiling Buddha bombs.

Baratol was also used in the Mills bomb, a British hand grenade.
