= Republic of Vietnam National Police =

South Vietnamese police (1955–1975)

Republic of Vietnam National Police Cảnh sát Quốc gia Việt Nam Cộng hòa
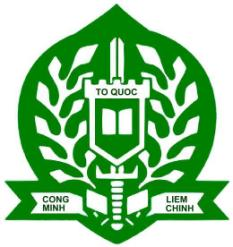
- Emblem

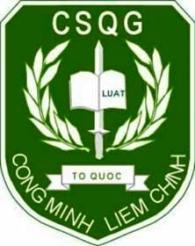
- Patch

- Flag
- Common name: police (cảnh sát)
- Abbreviation: RVNP (CSQG)
- Motto: Tổ quốc, Công minh, Liêm chính (Fatherland, Justice, Integrity)

Agency overview
- Formed: 1955
- Dissolved: 1975
- Employees: 130,000 agents (at height in 1973)
- Annual budget: 7,000,000 piastres

Operational structure
- Headquarters: Saigon
- Agency executive: Nguyễn Ngọc Loan, Director-General of the National Police

The Republic of Vietnam National Police – RVNP (Vietnamese: Cảnh sát Quốc gia Việt Nam Cộng hòa), Police Nationale de la République du Vietnam or Police Nationale for short (Vietnamese: Cảnh sát Quốc gia – CSQG) in French, was the official South Vietnamese national police force from 1962 to 1975, operating closely with the Army of the Republic of Vietnam (ARVN) during the Vietnam War.

== History ==
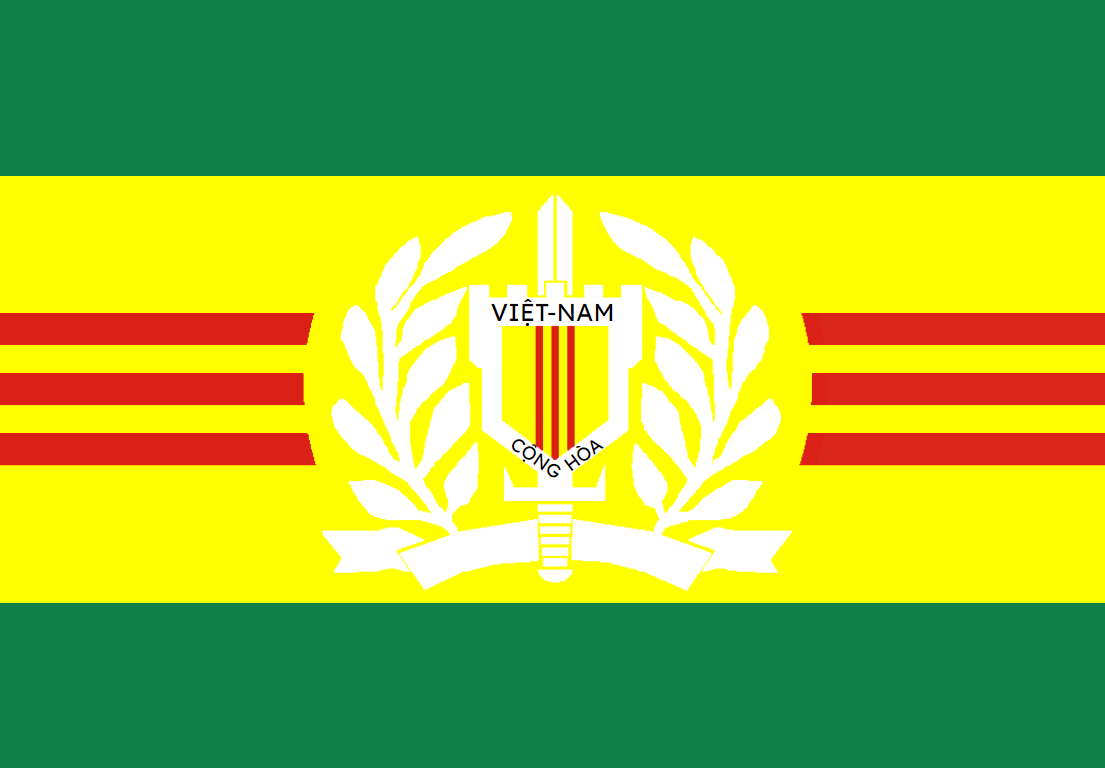
Republic of Vietnam National Police flag variant 1955-1975

The Republic of Vietnam National Police was officially created by President Ngô Đình Diệm's national decree in June 1962, integrating all the existing internal security and paramilitary agencies raised by the French Union authorities during the First Indochina War between 1946 and 1954, into a single National Police Force who answered to the Directorate General of National Police (Vietnamese: Tổng cục cảnh sát quốc gia – TCCSQG). These included the Vietnamese section of the indochinese Sûreté Générale secret police, the Saigon Municipal Police (French: Police municipale de Saïgon, or Công an thành phố Sài Gòn in Vietnamese), elements of the colonial National Guard of South Vietnam (French: Garde Nationale du Viet Nam Sud – GNVS, or Vệ binh quốc gia Nam Việt Nam – VBNV in Vietnamese), a rural Gendarmerie force or 'Civil Guard' (French: Garde Civile, or Cảnh Sát Dân Sự – CSDS in Vietnamese), the Combat Police (French: Police de Combat, or Cảnh Sát Chiến Dấu – CSCD in Vietnamese) and various provincial militia forces made of irregular auxiliaries (French: Supplétifs).

Transferred to South Vietnamese control in 1955, all the aforementioned security units were integrated in the early 1960s into a new national police force with the exception of the Civil Guard, which was placed under the authority of the Ministry of Defence. The CSQG had an initial strength of only 16,000 uniformed and plainclothes agents, being essentially an urban constabulary with no rural Gendarmerie component to counter the threat posed by the increasing Viet Cong (VC) insurgency in the countryside.

=== The National Police under Diệm 1955–1963 ===
Even before the official creation of the National Police, President Diệm was quick to employ the security forces inherited from the French in repressing both internal political dissent and organized crime. Throughout the late 1950s and into 1960, they helped the Vietnamese National Army (VNA) in suppressing the Hòa Hảo and Cao Đài militant religious and political sects, with approximately 25,000 armed militiamen, and the smaller but better organized Bình Xuyên Saigon-based gangster group.

=== 1964–1970 ===
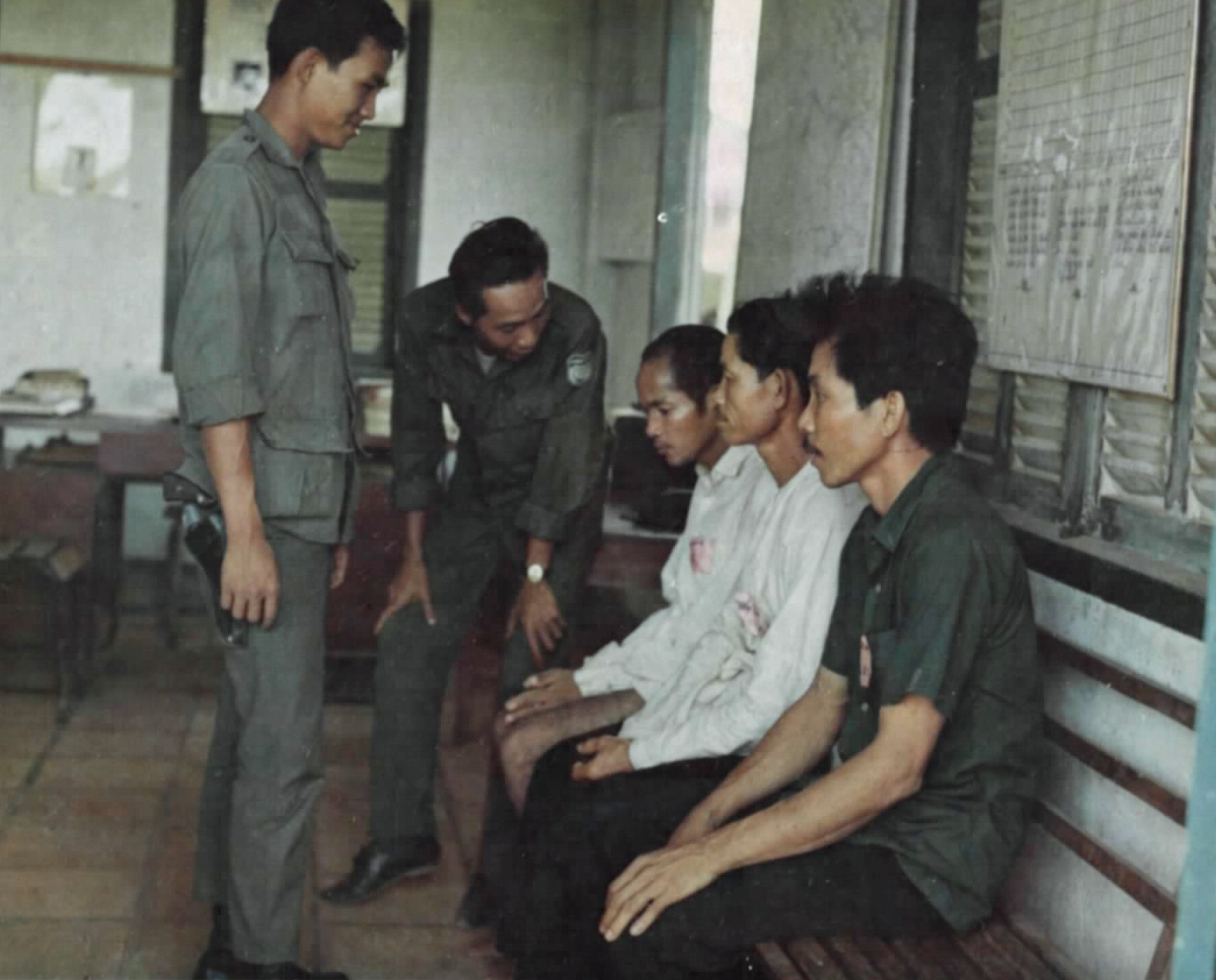
A Vietnamese National Policeman questions three civil defendants inside the Dinh Chanh District National Police HQ, December 8, 1968.

In February 1965 the new South Vietnamese government removed the popular and effective National Police chief, Colonel Ben, and replaced him with Colonel Pham Van Lieu, who was described by a US advisor as a man who "doesn't know the difference between a pair of handcuffs and a spittoon." Col. Lieu immediately removed numerous subordinates, seriously undermining the morale of the agency that was supposed to be leading the battle against the Viet Cong's subversive infrastructure.

By mid-1965 the force had met the American recommended goal of having three police officers for every 1,000 people, a rate higher than the 1.8 officers per 1,000 in the US.

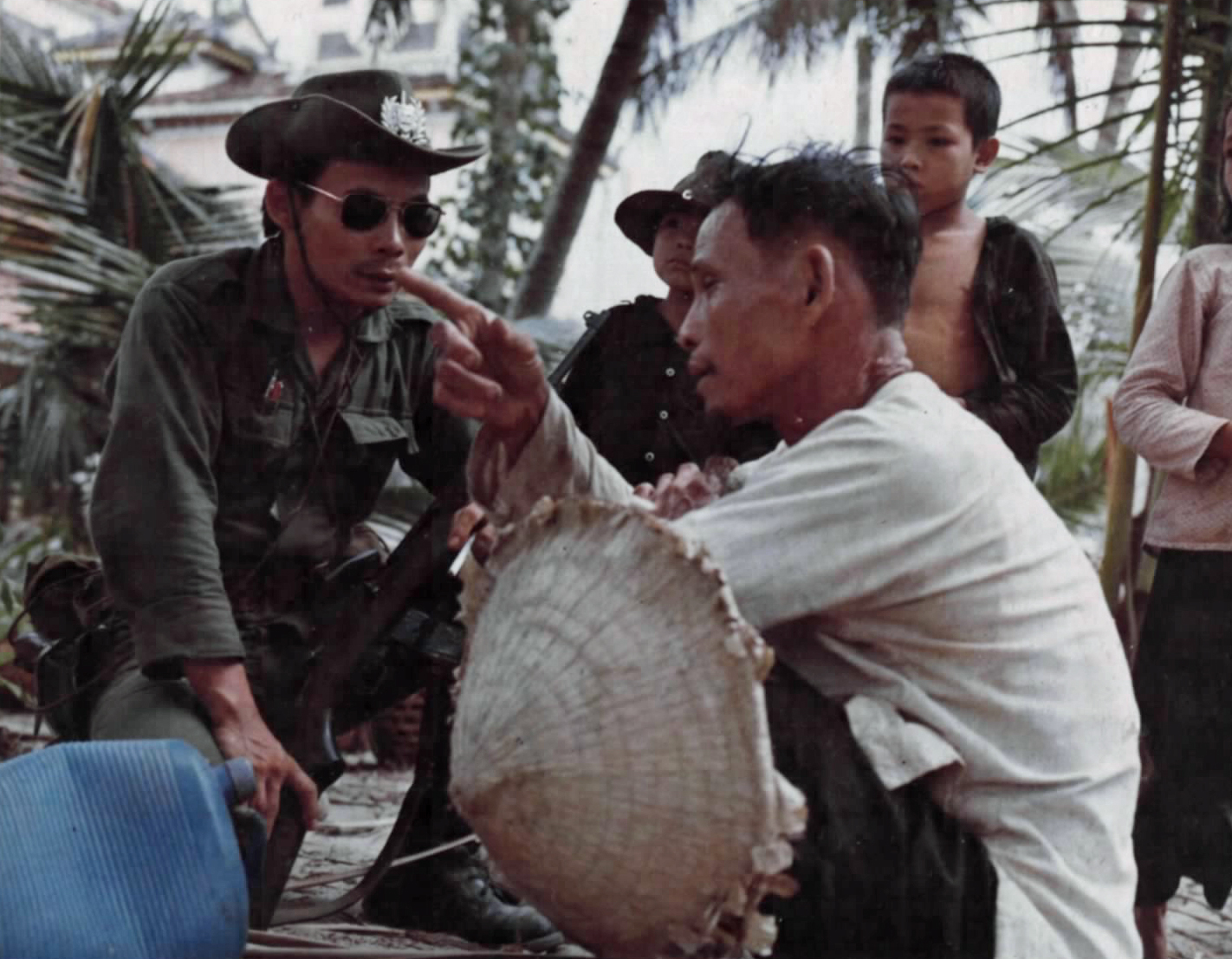
A Vietnamese National Policeman questions a suspected Vietcong in the village of Troung Lan, Binh Dinh Province, June 9, 1967.

=== The final years 1971–75 ===
The CSQG strength peaked in February 1971 at 103,859 personnel – including 3,144 female agents, mostly engaged in clerical work –, 4,450 vehicles and some 830 motorcycles of various types. However, out of this total only 27,565 officers and enlisted men were of career status, the remainder being on contract, daily paid or floating assimilated. Plans were drawn late that year to further expand the Police to 124,050 and later to 160,000, though the actual authorized strength in 1973 stood at about 130,000 men and women.

== Structure ==
The CSQG was organized at national level with logistical and administrative support from Saigon, but individual police departments were under the operational control of the provincial police chiefs. All components of the Police system were administered directly by the Directorate General of National Police (TCCSQG) at the National Police Headquarters in Saigon, which also provided technical or combat support for law-enforcement and other internal security duties throughout the Country. The Directorate General was headed by Sub-Brigadier general Nguyễn Ngọc Loan, who led a staff comprising a deputy director and six assistant directors for administration, personnel and training, intelligence, operations, Field Forces and scientific police. By the late 1960s, the Vietnamese National Police was organized into nine major specialized departments or 'branches', which were:

- River and Coastal Police
- Traffic Control Police
- Judiciary Police
- Special Police
- Scientific Police
- Police Medical Service
- Administration Service
- VIP Protection Service
- Field Police

== Training facilities ==
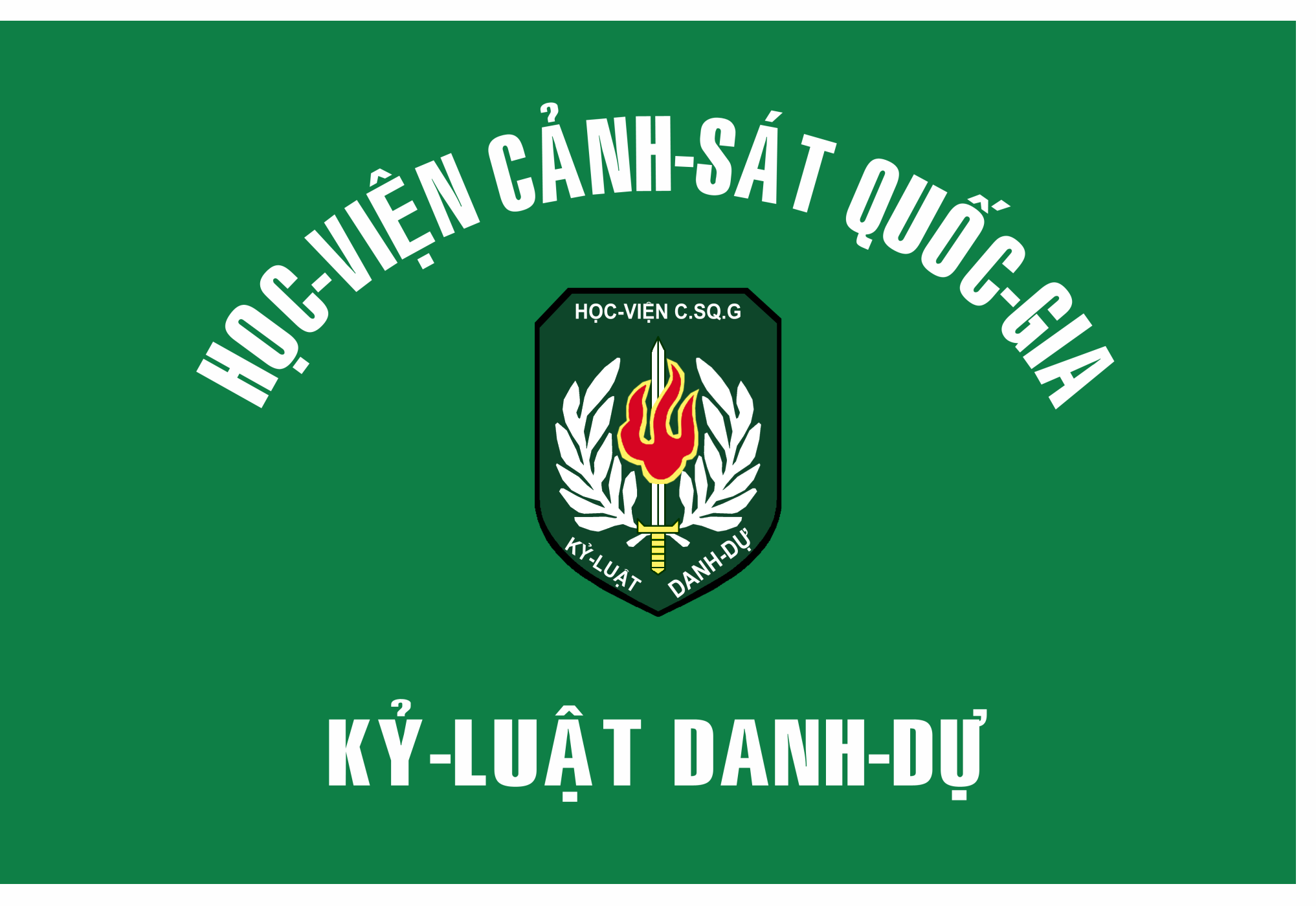
Flag of the Republic of Vietnam National Police Academy

All instruction and management of training facilities fell upon the Personnel and Training Directorate (Vietnamese: Ban nhân sự và đào tạo) at National Police headquarters in Saigon. Recruits first underwent the basic 12-week course, which consisted primarily of weapons handling, tactics, Taekwondo and drill, ministered at the main National Police Elementary Training Centre (Vietnamese: Trung tâm huấn luyện so ca) located at Rach Dua, near Vũng Tàu. After finishing the course, the best-qualified students were selected to be sent for officer training to the National Police Academy (Vietnamese: Học viện cảnh sát quốc gia) at Thủ Đức near Saigon, where they attended advanced instruction programs at all levels, which comprised:

- Officer promotion courses up to and including the rank of Lieutenant colonel
- Administrative and staff training
- Senior officer seminars
- Judicial Police training for officers and NCOs
- Instructors' courses at both officer and lower rank levels

Those recruits with lower qualifications went instead to the Non-commissioned Officer (NCO) School run by the ARVN at its Combat Training Centre (Vietnamese: Trung tâm huấn luyện chiến đấu) in Da Lat, co-located to the namesake South Vietnamese Armed Forces Military Academy, where they received special training that would enable them to graduate as Police NCOs.

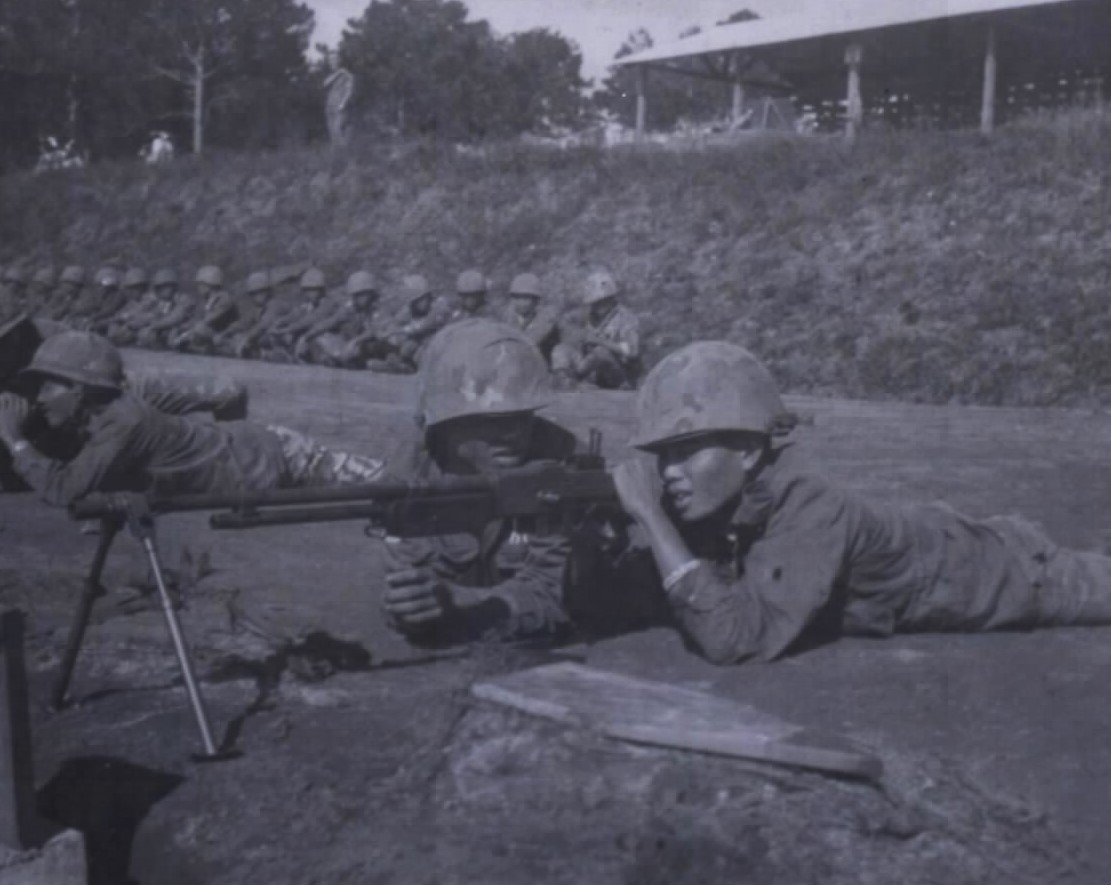
Trainees fire BARs at the National Police Field Forces Training Center, August 22, 1970.

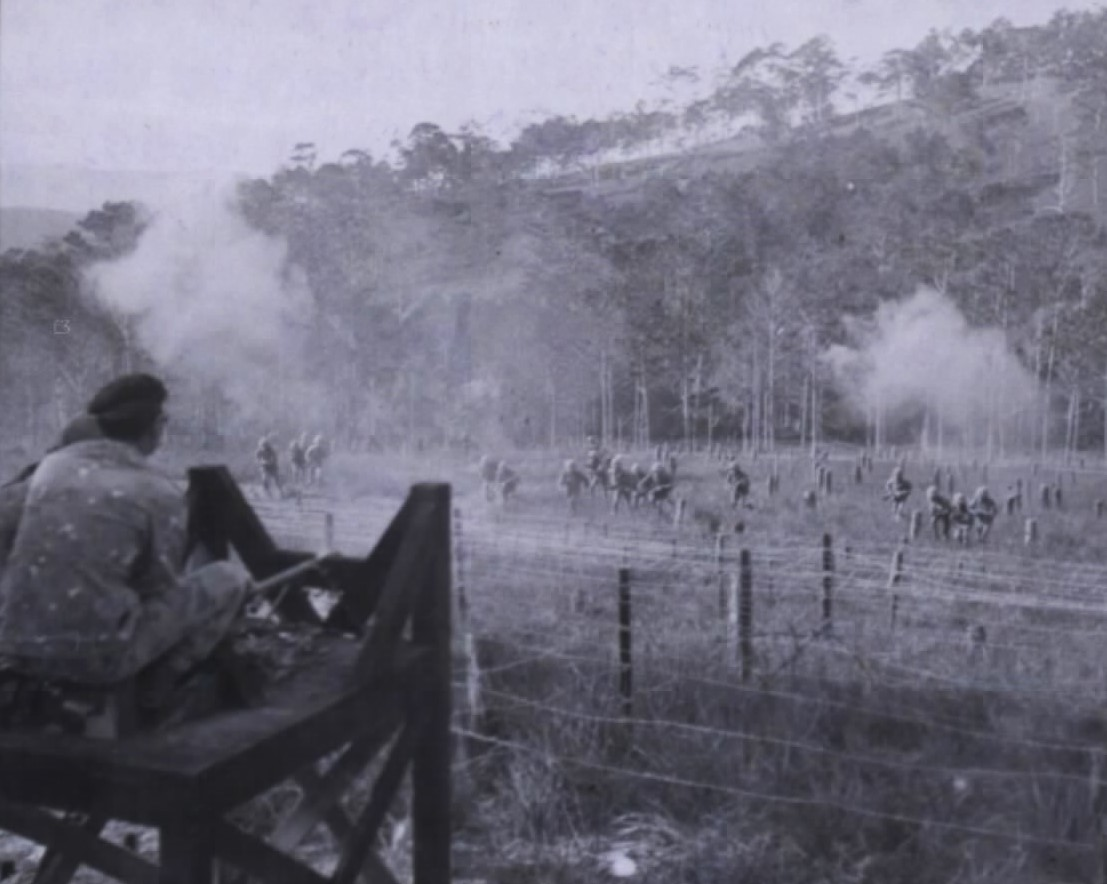
Instructors at the National Police Field Forces Training Center, fire .30 caliber machine guns over the heads of trainees, August 22, 1970.

Specialists such as field policemen, patrol boat crewmen, vehicle drivers (this category included squad car, armoured car and Jeep drivers, and motorcyclists), radio operators, medics, mechanics, and clerks were trained in various other National Police and Armed Forces' schools. More specialized training was also provided to selected male and female personnel assigned to the other CSQG branches. River and Coastal Police boat crews were trained at the Riverine Force Training Centre (Vietnamese: Trung tâm huấn luyện lực lượng sông nước) co-located at their Phú Xuân HQ, near Huế. Field Police personnel – including officers and NCOs – underwent eight weeks' of training in paramilitary skills at the police training Centres of Malaysia and the Philippines. Instruction covered subjects such as jungle warfare, intelligence-gathering operations, law-enforcement and riot control techniques. To upgrade their capabilities, squads and platoons were returned periodically to these training centers for six weeks of unit refresher training, but for most CSDC companies and battalions posted in the provinces their refresher course actually took place in-country at the regional training centers.

=== Foreign assistance ===
Additional military "on the job" training was provided to Field Police units in the field by U.S. Mobile Training Teams or by Australian advisors from the Australian Army Training Team Vietnam (AATTV). Selected officer students attended specialized courses at the International Police Academy in Washington, D.C. while other students were sent to the Malaysian Police Field Force Special Training Centre (Malay: Sekolah Latihan Pasukan Polis Hutan; SLPPH) at Kentonmen, Ulu Kinta, Perak in Malaysia to attend advanced specialized police and instructor's courses. After graduation, some of these new National Police officers upon returning to South Vietnam would them be posted as Field Police instructors at the Police training centers to pass on their skills to CSDC recruits.

== List of National Police Directors-General ==
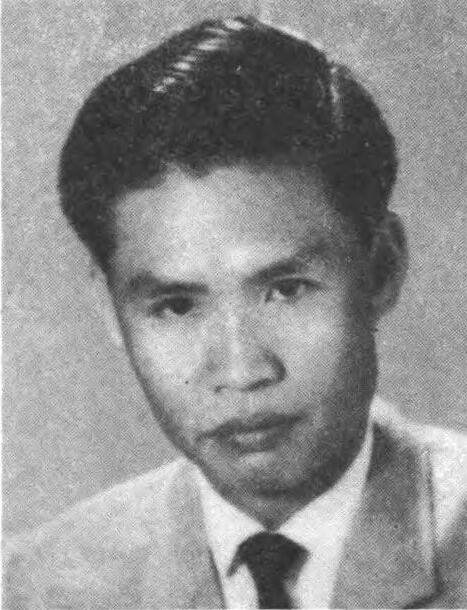
Nguyễn Văn Lễ, 1968.

- Lại Văn Sang
- Mai Hữu Xuân
- Nguyễn Ngọc Lễ
- Nguyễn Văn Tôn
- Trần Vĩnh Ðắt
- Trần Bá Thành
- Nguyễn Chữ
- Nguyễn Văn Hay
- Trần Văn Tư
- Nguyễn Văn Là
- Nguyễn Ngọc Loan
- Phạm Xuân Chiểu
- Ðàm Trung Mộc
- Nguyễn Văn Y

== List of National Police Commanders ==
- Trần Thanh Phong
- Nguyễn Khắc Bình

== Weapons and equipment ==
The CSQG was lightly armed by military standards, but heavily armed by conventional police standards. Initially, most of its weaponry was surplus French and U.S. World War II/Korean War-vintage. From 1969, rifles, carbines and submachine guns began to be replaced by assault rifles and although the latter became the CSQG's primary weapon, it never displaced entirely the earlier weaponry. Police units had no crew-served weapon systems such as mortars or any other indirect fire weapons.

- United States M1917 revolver
- United States Smith & Wesson Model 10 revolver
- United States Smith & Wesson SW2 Bodyguard .38 Special snub-nose revolver
- United States Colt Cobra .38 Special snub-nose revolver
- United States Smith & Wesson Model 39 pistol
- United States Colt.45 M1911A1 automatic pistol
- United States M1 Garand battle rifle
- United States M1/M2 carbine
- United States M3/M3A1 "Grease Gun" submachine gun
- Israel IMI Uzi submachine gun
- United States M1A1 Thompson submachine gun
- United States M16A1 assault rifle
- United States Ithaca model 37 pump-action shotgun
- United States Stevens model 77E pump-action shotgun
- United States M1918A2 BAR light machine gun
- United States M60 machine gun
- United States Browning M1919A4 .30 cal medium machine gun
- United States M79 grenade launcher

=== Vehicles ===
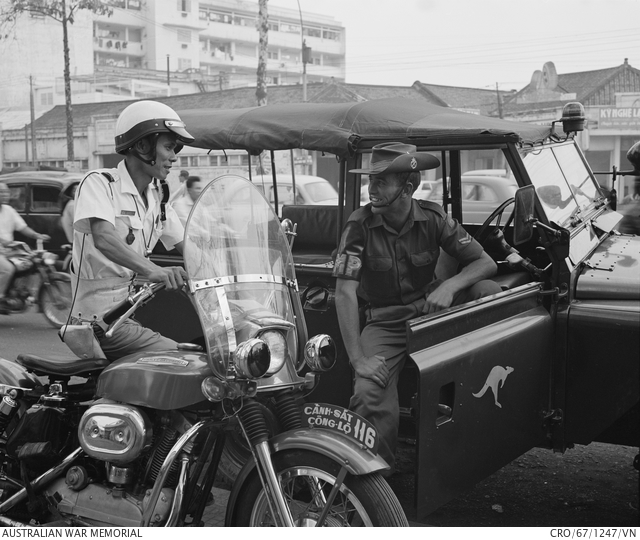
Australian MP and South Vietnamese motorbike policeman in Saigon, 1967.

- United States Willys MB Jeep
- United States Willys M38 MC Jeep
- United States Willys M38A1 MD Jeep
- United States Dodge M37 utility truck
- United States Kaiser Jeep M715 utility truck
- United States M8 Greyhound Light armoured car
- United States V-100 Commando armoured personnel carrier/Internal security vehicle
- United States 1960 Ford Falcon patrol car
- United States Harley-Davidson 1957 XLB Sportster motorcycle

== Uniforms and insignia ==
The Traffic Control Police agents were given an all-white cotton service uniform consisting of a long-sleeved shirt and trousers, worn with a matching white peaked cap; the shirt had dark blue removable shoulder boards and badges and other insignia were in silvered metal.

=== Headgear ===
Both Field Police and River and Coastal Police troopers were distinguished from the rest of the National Police by a black beret made of a single piece of wool attached to a black leather rim-band provided with two tightening-straps at the back. Berets were often carefully molded to achieve a pointed shape or 'Cockscomb crest', affected by so many South Vietnamese military personnel since it reportedly gave the wearer a more imposing figure and aggressive 'Shock trooper' or 'Commando' allure. It was worn French-style pulled to the left, with the National Police cap badge placed above the right eye. Originally intended to be worn with the regulation National Police dress uniform in formal occasions, the beret was sometimes seen in the field but it was often replaced by camouflage jungle hats and US M-1 model 1964 steel helmets, the latter worn with a matching 'Clouds' camouflage cover. A US M-1 Helmet liner painted in shiny black, marked with white-and-red stripes at the sides and the initials "TC" (Vietnamese: Tuần Cảnh – patrol) was worn by National Police constables assigned patrol duties or riot control in urban areas.

=== Footwear ===
Black leather low laced shoes were perscribed to wear by uniformed Police agents assigned patrol duties on urban areas. Black leather combat boots were provided by the Americans who issued both the early U.S. Army M-1962 'McNamara' model and the M-1967 model with DMS 'ripple' pattern rubber sole, standard issue in the ARVN. Field policemen generally wore the highly prized U.S. Army Jungle boot and Japanese-produced black canvas-and-rubber Indigenous Combat Boots, or Vietnamese-produced green canvas-and-rubber "Goalong" tropical boots, replaced by commercial plastic or rubber flip-flops and leather peasant sandals while in garrison. Some individuals had zippers put into the insides of their Jungle boots so that they could be laced permanently in a fancy 'airborne' pattern, while the wearer could get into and out of his boots quickly and easily by using the zipper.

=== Rank insignia ===
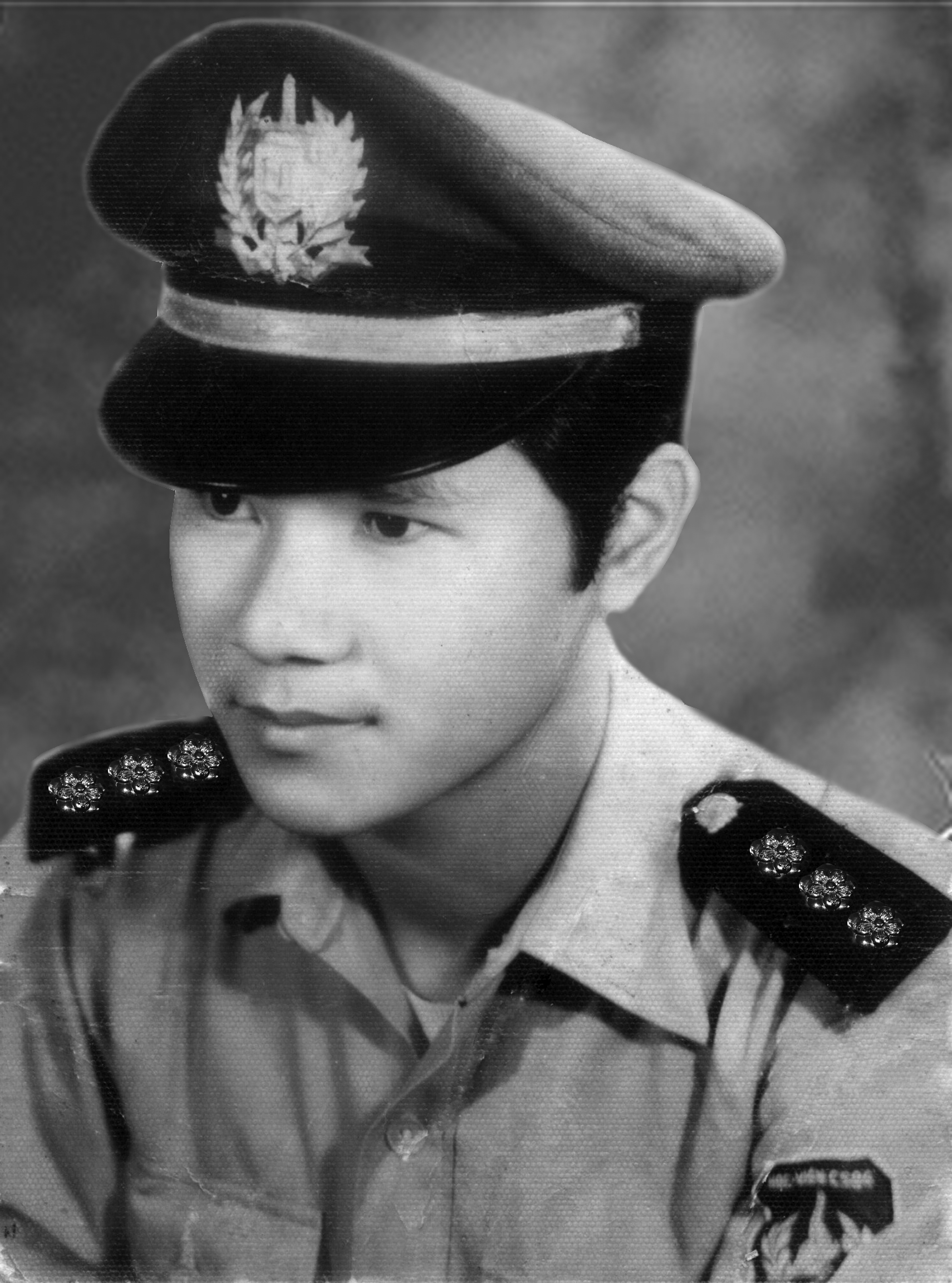
Captain Nguyen Van Diep

==== 1955–1962 ranks ====
- Tổng kiểm tra – Controller General
- Kiểm tra – Controller
- Quận trưởng – Commissioner
- Biên tập viên – Redactor
- Thẩm sát viên – Inspector
- Cảnh sát viên – Patrolman/Patrolwoman

==== 1962–1971 ranks ====
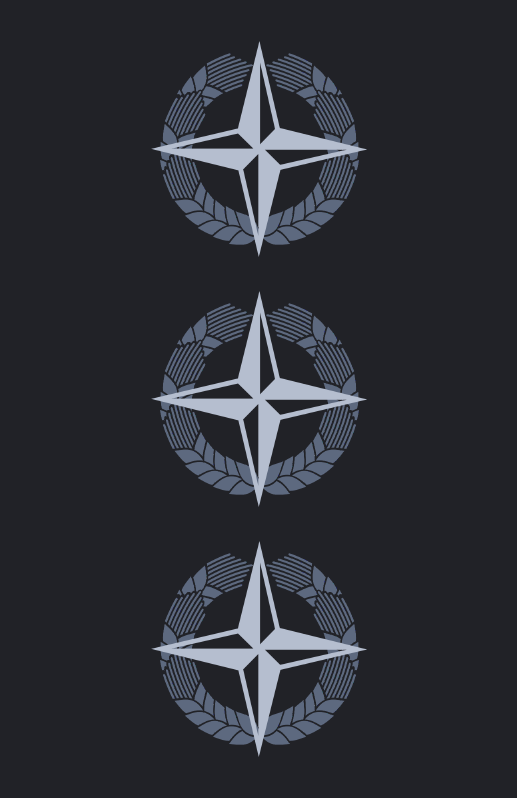
- Tổng kiểm tra – Director General of Police
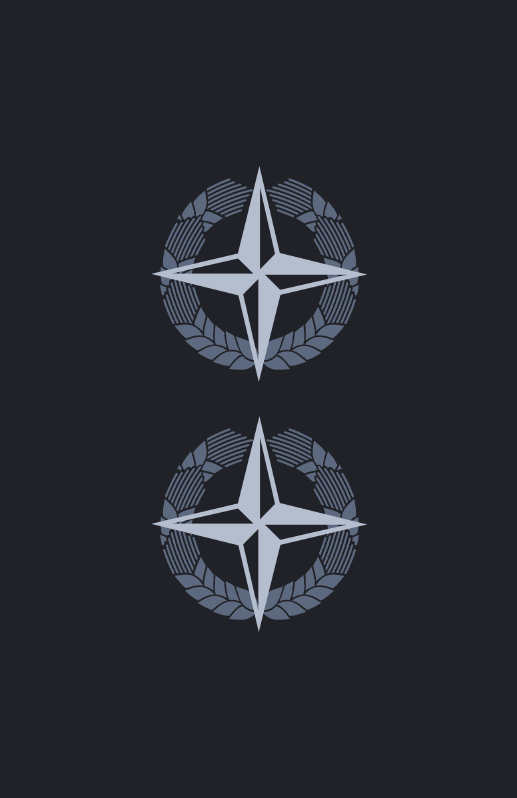
- Kiểm tra – Director
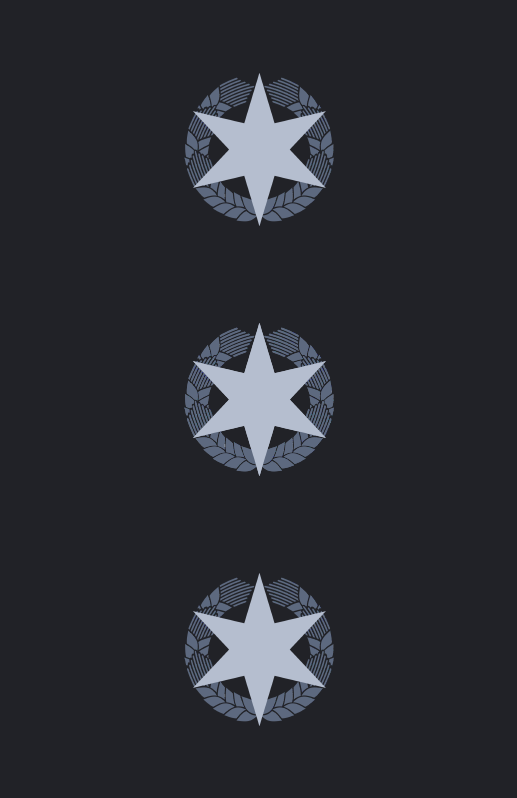
- Quận trưởng thượng hạng – Commissioner 1st class
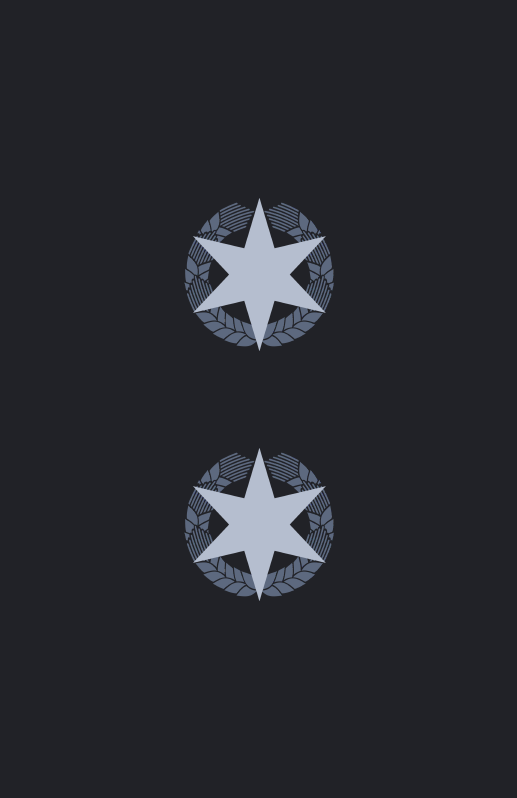
- Quận trưởng – Commissioner
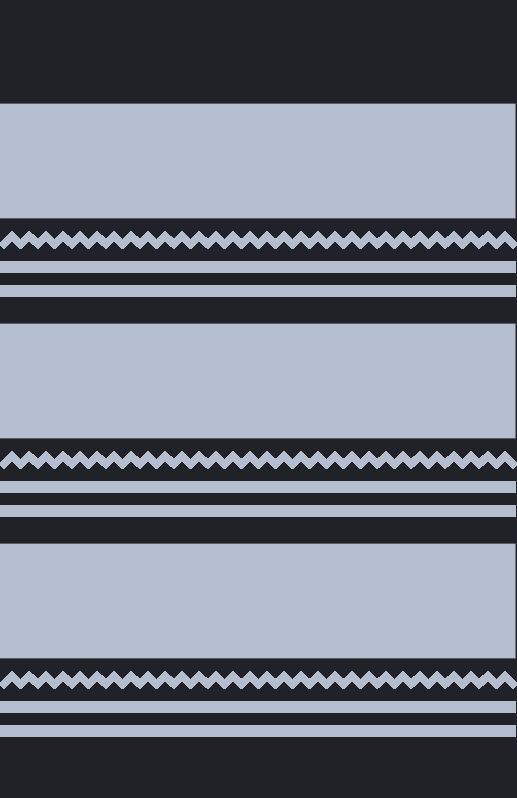
- Biên tập viên thượng hạng – Deputy commissioner
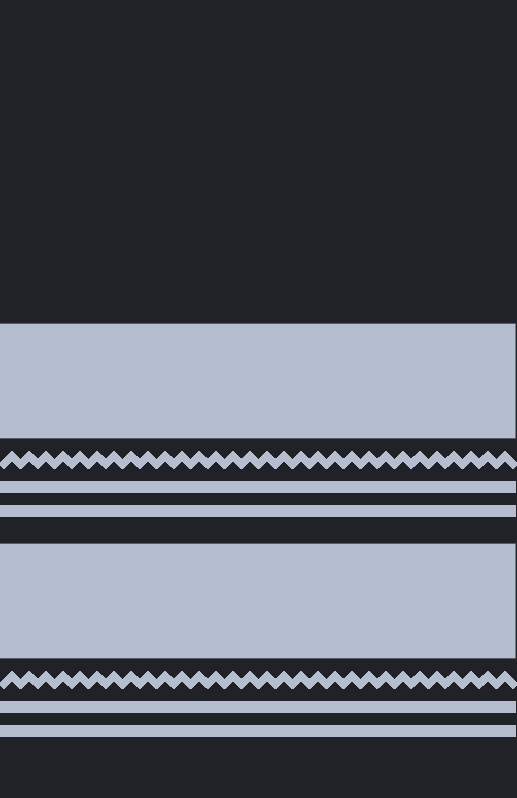
- Biên tập viên – Chief superintendent
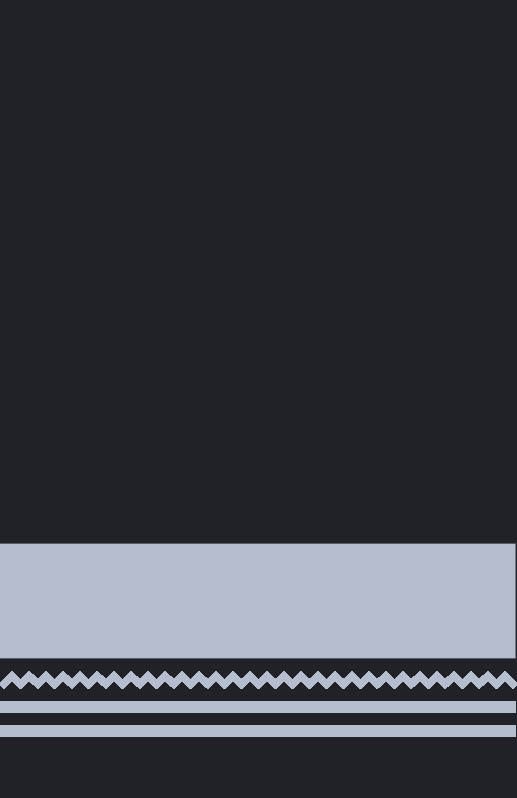
- Biên tập viên công nhựt – Superintendent
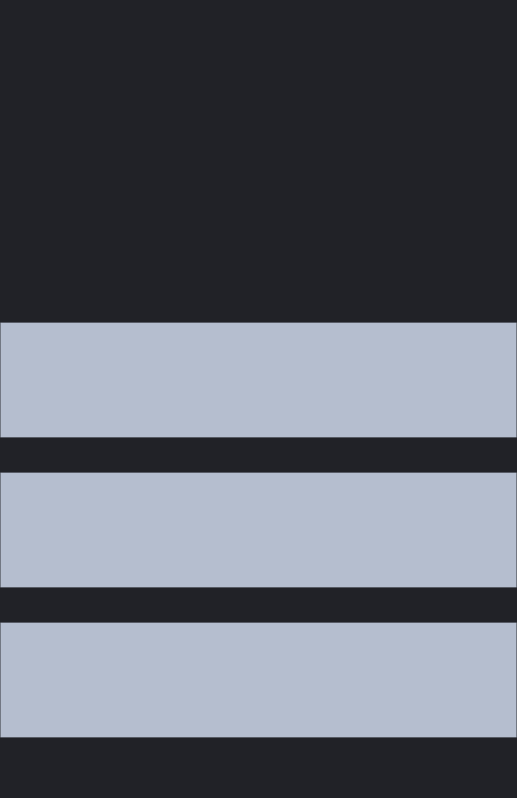
- Thẩm sát viên thượng hạng – Chief inspector
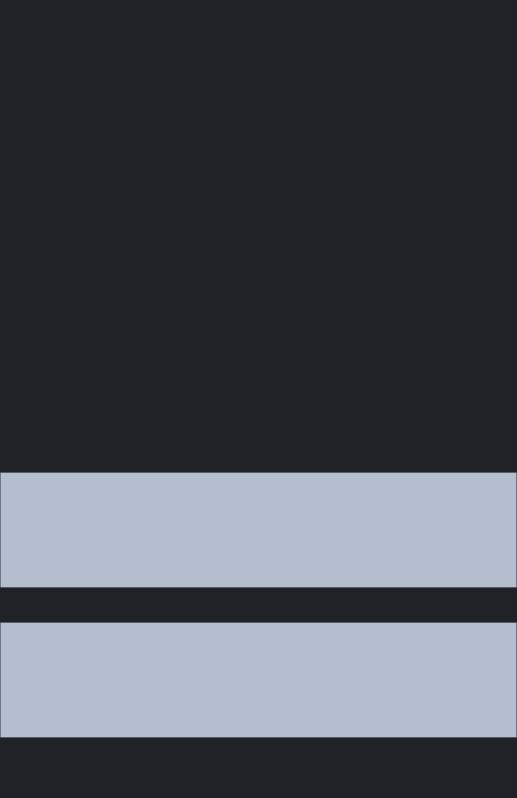
- Thẩm sát viên – Inspector
- Thẩm sát viên công nhựt – Station inspector
- Phó thẩm sát viên thượng hạng – Sub-inspector 1st class
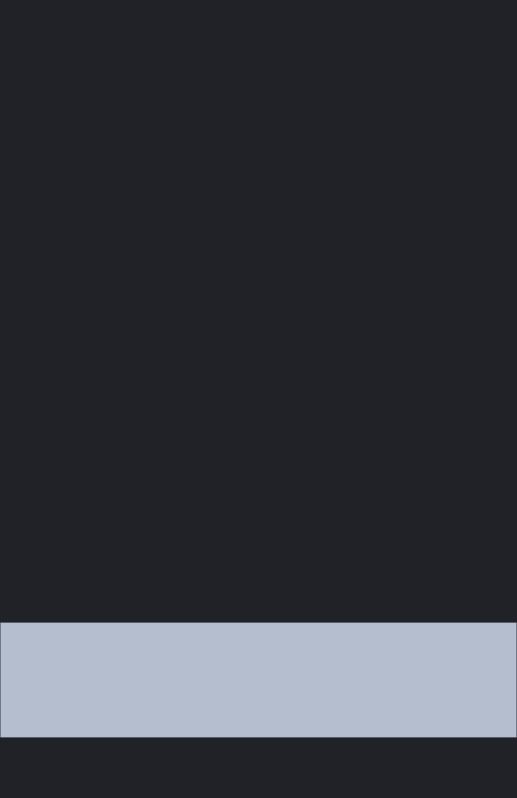
- Phó thẩm sát viên – Sub-inspector
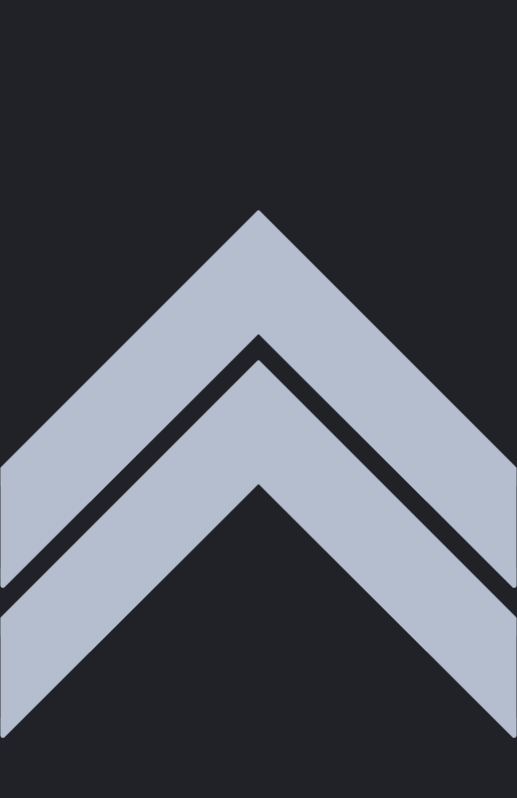
- Phó thẩm sát viên công nhựt – Acting Sub-inspector
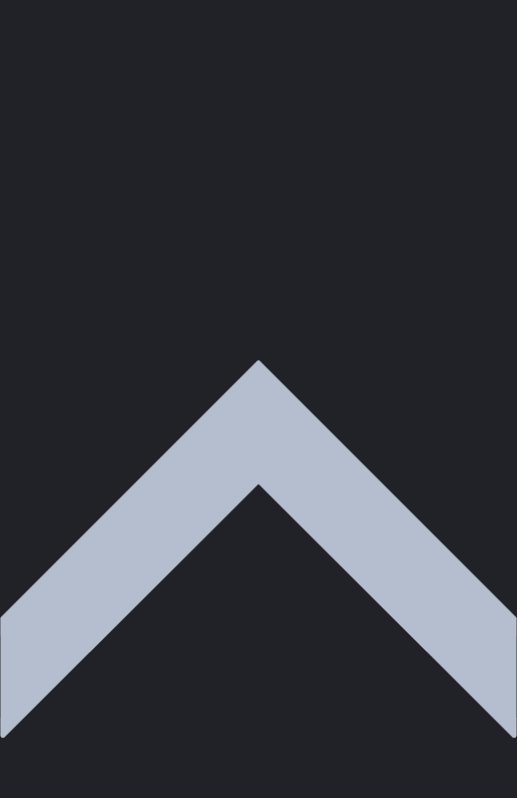
- Cảnh sát viên – Patrolman/Patrolwoman

==== 1971–1975 ranks ====
- Đại tướng – General/Director-General
- Trung tướng – Lieutenant general/Deputy Director-General
- Thiếu tướng – Major general
- Chuẩn tướng – Brigadier general
- Đại tá – Colonel
- Trung tá – Lieutenant colonel
- Thiếu tá – Major
- Đại úy – Captain
- Trung úy – First lieutenant
- Thiếu úy – Second lieutenant
- Thượng sĩ nhất – First sergeant
- Thượng sĩ – Master sergeant
- Trung sĩ nhất – Sergeant first class
- Cảnh sát viên – Patrolman/Patrolwoman

=== Insignia ===
Regarding the placement of insignia, the Field Police (CSDC) had a system of its own, originally adapted from their dress uniform. Most CSDC troopers wore no insignia on their field camouflage uniforms while on operations, or sometimes just their Company patch in either cloth or metal versions in a pocket hanger following the French model suspended from the right shirt pocket. Special Recon Teams were issued a round embroidered black patch edged red, with red 'CSQG' and 'TSDB' lettering and winged sword-bayonet pointed down.

== See also ==
- Junk Force
- List of weapons of the Vietnam War
- MIKE Force
- Phoenix Program
- Provincial Reconnaissance Units
- Republic of Vietnam Military Forces
- Royal Thai Police Aerial Reinforcement Unit (PARU)
- Royal Lao Police
- South Vietnamese Regional Forces
