= Police judiciaire =

Police judiciaire is French for judicial police.

Police judiciaire may also refer to:

== Law enforcement agencies ==
=== France ===
- Judicial police (France), known in French as police judiciaire
  - Direction centrale de la Police judiciaire, or Central Directorate of the Judicial Police, which oversees the judicial police in France
  - Direction régionale de la police judiciaire de la préfecture de police de Paris, the Paris division of the judicial police
  - Police judiciaire in overseas territory Saint Pierre and Miquelon, see Law enforcement in Saint Pierre and Miquelon

=== Elsewhere ===
- Police judiciaire (Belgium), a division of the Belgian federal police
- Police judiciaire (Burkina Faso), a division of the Municipal Police of Burundi
- Police judiciaire (Burundi), a division of the National Police of Burundi
- Police judiciaire (Central African Republic), the criminal investigation division of the National Police of the Central African Republic
- Police judiciaire (Niger), a division of the National Police of Niger
- Republic of Vietnam Judiciary Police

== Other uses ==
- P.J. (TV series) (Police judiciaire) a French TV series starring Bruno Wolkowitch (1997–2009)
