= Ted Serong =

Australian brigadier

Francis Philip "Ted" Serong
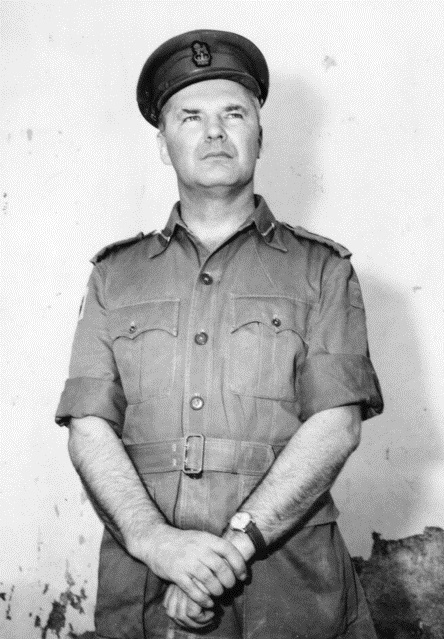
- Colonel Serong as commanding officer AATTV, c. 1962
- Born: 11 November 1915; Abbotsford, Victoria
- Died: 1 October 2002 (aged 86); Melbourne, Victoria
- Military career
- Allegiance: Australia
- Branch: Australian Army
- Service years: 1934–1968
- Rank: Brigadier
- Commands: Australian Army Training Team Vietnam
- Conflicts: Second World War; Malayan Emergency; Vietnam War
- Awards: Distinguished Service Order; Officer of the Order of the British Empire; Legion of Merit (United States); Knight of the National Order of Vietnam; Cross of Gallantry (Vietnam)

Brigadier Francis Philip "Ted" Serong, DSO, OBE (11 November 1915 – 1 October 2002) was a senior officer of the Australian Army. Born into a Roman Catholic family in 1915, Serong's opposition to communism led him to join the army, graduating from the Royal Military College, Duntroon, in 1937. During the Second World War he mainly served in training and staff roles, but saw combat against the Japanese at Wewak late in the war. In the post-war period he had a significant influence on the training of the Australian Army, which he helped re-orient to warfare in South East Asia, heading the jungle training centre at Canungra in 1955 and developing the army's counter-insurgency doctrine. He instructed the armed forces of Burma in jungle warfare in the late 1950s and was a strategic advisor to the Burmese Army from 1960 to 1962.

Serong was appointed to command the Australian Army Training Team Vietnam (AATTV) in 1962. He was later seconded to the Americans and was senior advisor to the South Vietnamese Police Field Force between 1965 and 1968. Leaving the army in 1968, he remained in Vietnam as a security and intelligence adviser to the South Vietnamese government, as well as working for the Rand organisation, Hudson Institute and other corporations, and consulting to the Pentagon and several US presidents. He continued to serve in Vietnam until the fall of Saigon in 1975. He was considered a world authority on counter-insurgency warfare and wrote widely on the subject. In later life he maintained an interest in Australian defence issues and was at times a controversial figure due to his support for several citizens' militia groups, conspiracy theories and right-wing political causes. He died, aged eighty-six, in 2002.

== Early life ==
Ted Serong was born in the suburb of Abbotsford in Melbourne on 11 November 1915, the first child of William and Mabel Serong. His father was of Portuguese heritage from the island of Madeira; the family had first settled in Australia in 1824. An apprentice blacksmith, William had served in the Citizens Military Force (CMF) and later the First Australian Imperial Force (1st AIF) in France during the First World War, before specializing in the maintenance of weapons and engineering stores, and working for the Department of Defence as a quality control engineer. Serong's younger brother, Raymond, was born in 1917. William believed in physical fitness and discipline, and he taught both of his sons to box, as well as to scout, shoot rabbits, and live off the land. Between 1930 and 1932, during the Great Depression, the boys lived in the bush for extended periods, relying on their hunting skills to survive.

Raised as Roman Catholics, Ted and his younger brother initially went to school at the local Good Shepherd convent, before attending St Joseph's Primary School at Abbotsford. In 1928, at the age of 13, Ted moved to St Colman's School in Fitzroy; at the end of the year he won a government scholarship to continue his studies the next year at Parade College, in East Melbourne, where he completed his Intermediate Certificate in 1930. He subsequently completed Leaving Honours, achieving highly in maths, physics and English. After winning a scholarship he attended St Kevin's College in 1931, where he was later influenced by its culture of Irish Roman Catholicism, notions of Australian—as opposed to British—patriotism, and a belief in the constant struggle between "the forces of freedom and atheistic communism". He also met his lifelong friend, B. A. Santamaria, who was two years ahead of him at St Kevin's, and with whom he developed a similar world-view. His politics were further affected by the later events of the Spanish Civil War from 1937, and the Chinese Communist Revolution in 1949.

== Military career ==
=== Early service and Second World War ===
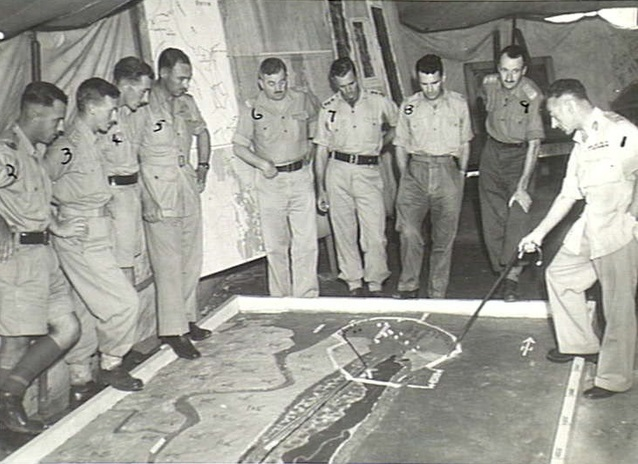
Officers of the 6th Division in 1944, including Serong, then a major, third from the right.

In November 1933 Serong applied to the Royal Military College, Duntroon, but was unsuccessful. He subsequently joined the CMF, serving in the 57th/60th Battalion, and was based in Heidelberg, in outer Melbourne. In a five-month period he went from the rank of private to lance corporal. He also studied the military and civilian subjects that made up Duntroon's first-year curriculum in the hope of gaining entry into the college at second-year level in 1934. Serong successfully completed the service entry exam in August 1934, entering RMC in February 1935. In 1936 Serong won the welterweight category of the RMC boxing championship. At the end of 1937 he graduated from Duntroon as a lieutenant, and initially served with the coastal artillery, being posted to Queenscliff in 1938. Subsequent postings included Fort Largs near Adelaide to help raise and train Militia and develop the artillery installation there, before returning to Queenscliff as an instructor in 1940.

With the outbreak of the Second World War, Serong was concerned he might spend the entire conflict in the coastal artillery. After transferring to Second Australian Imperial Force (2nd AIF) to be able to serve overseas, he arranged a posting to the Armoured Corps and was posted to the 2/8th Armoured Regiment as its adjutant in July 1941. Serong's division, the 1st Armoured Division, had initially been earmarked to deploy to North Africa to fight the Germans and Italian, but in early 1942 it had been ordered to northern Australia to defend against a possible Japanese invasion instead. During this time Raymond had been serving as a sergeant with the 2/8th Battalion, which was part of the 6th Division fighting in North Africa, Greece and Crete. Meanwhile, Serong had married a nurse, Kathleen Blayney, on 19 February 1942, and was promoted temporary captain, returning to Duntroon to complete the first wartime staff course. Raymond subsequently returned to Australia, but later died of malaria in Melbourne in May that year. Serong deployed to New Guinea in November 1942 as a major, posted to the operations staff of the 6th Division in Port Moresby, just as the Australians halted the advance of the Japanese at the height of the Kokoda Track campaign.

In 1943 Serong served as General Staff Officer 2 with the combined 6th and 7th Divisions on the Atherton Tableland in Far North Queensland, where they were resting and retraining prior to conducting further operations. In early 1944 he instructed on the staff course at Cabarlah. That August, he moved to Aitape to prepare for the deployment of the 6th Division. He was later attached to American forces for the landing on Morotai Island in the Netherlands East Indies in mid-September 1944. In the last few weeks of the war, Serong was mentioned in despatches for his actions fighting the Japanese at Wewak, whilst serving with the infantry in the 35th Battalion. During an incident on 21 July 1945, he commanded a force of three platoons and native police on a patrol to destroy a Japanese ammunition dump. Although serving more time in training roles than in combat, during the war Serong had made important contacts with whom he would later work in future postings, including Colonel Reg Pollard, who went on to become Chief of the General Staff (CGS), and Colonel Charles Spry, later the Director of Military Intelligence and the Director General of the Australian Security Intelligence Organisation (ASIO).

=== Post-war ===
Serong advanced rapidly in the years following the war. In November 1945 he was appointed Deputy Assistant Adjutant-General at the Directorate of Army Personnel Administration in Melbourne. He was promoted to temporary lieutenant colonel in January 1947; the rank became substantive in October 1948. In May 1948 he was posted to Army Headquarters, Eastern Command, in Sydney as General Staff Officer 1. He joined the Directorate of Military Training at Army Headquarters, Melbourne, in January 1952. In 1954 Serong was tasked with redirecting Army training towards jungle warfare, in preparation for operations in South East Asia. As a colonel, he headed the Jungle Warfare Training Centre (JWTC), which had been recently re-established at Canungra, in south-east Queensland, from 1955 to 1957. The centre trained personnel for counter-insurgency operations during the Malayan Emergency against communist guerrillas fighting the security forces there. Under his direction the course at Canungra taught soldiers automatic responses and contact drills to cover the situations they might encounter in jungle warfare, emphasising instinctive shooting and patrolling, as well "battle inoculation" and physical conditioning. These skills underpinned the Australian Army's methods of dispersed patrolling in small groups moving quietly through the jungle, techniques utilised while fighting the Japanese in New Guinea during the Second World War, and later in Malaya and Vietnam. According to Serong "...conventional soldiers think of the jungle as being full of lurking enemies. Under our system, we will do the lurking." Officers were also trained in battle tactics at Canungra, and various research and development activities were undertaken.

Following its independence from Britain in 1948, Burma had been fighting against ethnic unrest and Chinese Nationalist Kuomintang irregulars, and several Burmese Army officers had trained in Australia in the 1950s. A Burmese staff officer, Major Muang Muang, later requested the assistance of Serong or another Australian officer. As a result, Serong was sent to Burma as a counter-insurgency instructor with the Burmese armed forces, lecturing senior officers for a few months in 1957 before returning to Australia. Serong subsequently advocated the dispatch of a small team of Australian officers to assist in training the Burmese, but this did not occur. At the request of Muang Muang, Serong returned to Burma in 1960, serving in Rangoon as a strategic adviser to the Burmese armed forces. Muang Muang had resigned in early 1961, and as a consequence Serong's influence was limited from this time, During this period he worked to prepare the Burmese for a border war against China. While in Burma Serong's expertise brought him to the attention of the US Central Intelligence Agency (CIA), and as a result he was later invited to supervise counter-insurgency programs in Vietnam. In February 1962 he wrote to Pollard, by then CGS, to suggest the deployment of a small team of Australian officers under his command to South Vietnam to work with the US advisory group there. Soon after the Burmese Army staged a coup, seizing control and moving the country towards communist China, after which Serong made arrangements to leave.

In April 1962 Serong returned to Australia, visiting Vietnam on an information-gathering tour on his way home, though Australia had not yet made a decision to provide military assistance to South Vietnam. He was appointed an Officer of the Order of the British Empire (OBE) in the Queen's Birthday Honours List the same year. The award had been made on Pollard's recommendation on the basis of Serong's work at Canungra and its influence on the training of the post-war Australian Army during "its formative period". Pollard wrote that "...the position that establishment now occupies in the Australian Army and its reputation overseas is due in great measure to the foresight and determination shown by Colonel Serong." He believed that the extent of Serong's influence on the Army's training had been because of his "originality of mind" and "strength of character" which had allowed him to enact "ideas and techniques which a less determined person might not have succeeded in doing." Serong's influence on the training of the Australian Army during this period was significant, codifying its techniques for jungle training. He also helped develop its doctrine for counter-insurgency warfare, the basis of which he had laid down in several planning initiatives.

=== Vietnam War ===
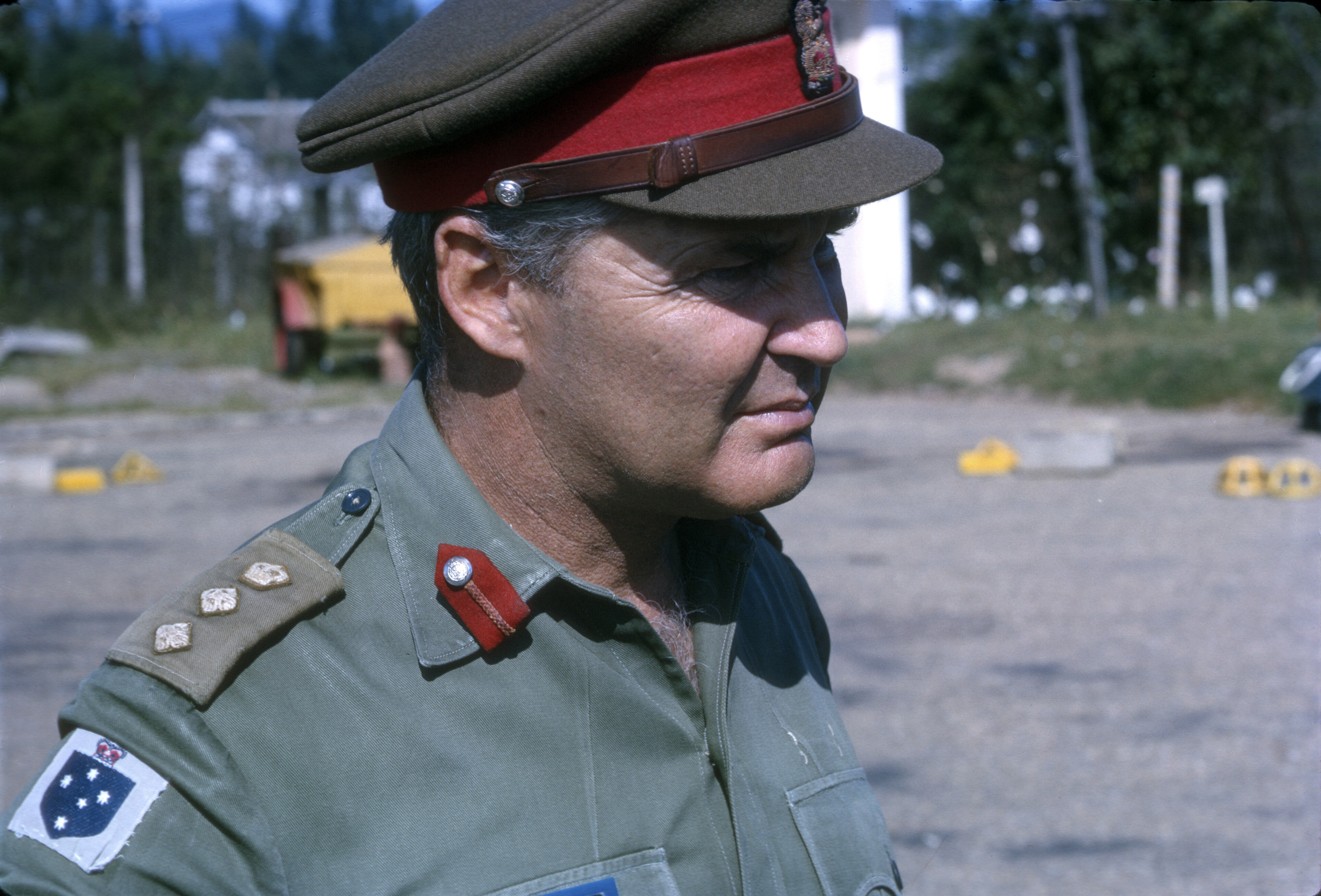
Colonel Ted Serong, CIC Australian forces in Saigon, Vietnam

In May 1962, Serong was selected to lead the 30-man Australian Army Training Team Vietnam (AATTV) of instructors to South Vietnam. Serong had been appointed by Pollard—with whom he was close friends—and was given authority to act unilaterally. He conducted a reconnaissance of South Vietnam in June, and the main body of the AATTV began arriving in early August. Serong based his headquarters in Saigon; the rest of the team was located at various installations throughout the country. Although the AATTV was mostly involved in training the South Vietnamese forces, a few had been attached to the Combined Studies Division, run by the CIA as a counter-insurgency organisation. Serong later became a counter-insurgency advisor to General Paul Harkins, Commander US MACV, but this relationship ended under Pollard's successor, Lieutenant General John Wilton, who reduced Serong's autonomy while continuing to grant him considerable latitude. In May 1963 Serong accepted an invitation to visit the US Special Warfare School in North Carolina, informing the Military Board only after doing so, and he later visited West Germany to become familiar with intelligence activities there, again without informing Wilton, who reacted angrily after finding out about it from a newspaper report. Meanwhile, in late 1963, Serong started to redeploy members of the team into combat advisory roles, and by February 1964 some officers and NCOs were working with Special Forces teams involved in counter-insurgency operations. Resulting in the first involvement of Australian personnel in combat during the conflict, this was a significant decision; it was retrospectively approved by Wilton, who lifted earlier restrictions on the role of AATTV personnel that had prevented them being involved in combat.

According to his biographer Anne Blair, Serong believed in the need to prevent the spread of communism throughout South East Asia, conceiving his mission in South Vietnam in terms of the Domino Theory. In August 1964, Sir Walter Cawthorn, then head of the Australian Secret Intelligence Service (ASIS), had instructed Serong to "...Get me ten years...", time that had to be bought to strengthen the other nations of the region against insurgency, as well as to destroy the Soviet Union economically. After handing over command of the AATTV to Colonel David Jackson in 1965, Serong remained in Vietnam as an advisor, seconded to the US Department of State. In 1965 he was awarded the Distinguished Service Order (DSO) for "outstanding courage and devotion to duty" while commanding the AATTV. During the 2 1/2 years he led the team he had worked hard to remain in personal contact with its members despite their geographic dispersion, and on occasion while visiting advisors in outstations he had become involved with clashes with the enemy during which his courage and leadership "contributed to the success of operations". Serong declined a formal presentation of the award. From 1965 to 1967 he was senior advisor to the South Vietnamese Police Field Force. Serong left the Australian Army in August 1968, at which time he was granted the honorary rank of brigadier.

Blair later wrote that Serong had accepted the defence of South Vietnam from communism as his "personal mission", and his decision to take an early retirement had been due to his increasing involvement with US organisations, the value they placed on his work and his profile as an international figure, as well as a growing "emotional distance" from the Australian Army and its senior leadership. He later wrote that he "... found a way of being of more service to the country outside it than in it." Serong stayed in South Vietnam as a security and intelligence adviser to the Vietnamese government. He also instructed at the National Defense College of South Vietnam and worked for the Rand organisation, Hudson Institute and other corporations, preparing strategic analyses. He was also a consultant to the Pentagon and the policy planning teams of several US presidents, including the Nixon administration. In 1971, Serong declared that South Vietnam had essentially won the war. Remaining long after the withdrawal of Australian forces, he continued to serve in South Vietnam until the Fall of Saigon. Serong departed Saigon the day prior to its capture, leaving by helicopter in the final airlift from the US embassy on 29 April 1975. He received several US and South Vietnamese awards, including the United States Legion of Merit, the (Vietnam) Medal of Honour, Cross of Gallantry (with palm), and Knight of the National Order of Vietnam.

== Later life ==
Following the war, Serong returned to Melbourne but struggled to return to civilian life and lived apart from his family, who had begun to live their own lives in his long absence. He was considered a world authority on counter-insurgency operations, and wrote widely on the subject in the 1970s. Described by John Farquharson as a major Cold War figure, Serong was recognised internationally for developing new tactics for counter-insurgency and jungle warfare. In retirement he became involved in anti-communist organisations and citizens' militia groups such as the World Anti-Communist League, Australian League of Rights, and the Ausi Freedom Scouts (Australians United for Survival and Freedom), of which he was a patron. He also supported conspiracy theories about the Port Arthur shooting in 1996 and allegations of government corruption (later found to have been based on a hoax, albeit unbeknown to Serong) as well as speaking on Australian defence issues. He was at times associated with right-wing individuals or organisations, advocating nationalism and the need for increased defence spending as part of a "forward defence" strategy, as well as strengthening of the peace-time Army Reserve, the development of inland Australia, opposition to gun control, concerns about the loss of national sovereignty and financial autonomy to the United Nations and International Monetary Fund, and limitations on immigration. While at times a controversial figure, his public reputation remained high and his opinions were rarely the subject of criticism in the media. Serong died of heart disease on 1 October 2002 aged 86 and was survived by his wife and their three daughters and three sons.
