= Republic of Vietnam National Police Administration Service =

The Republic of Vietnam National Police Administration Service or Police Administration (Vietnamese: Cảnh sát hành chánh – CSHC), ‘Service Administratif’ in French, was the bureaucratic and administrative department of the Republic of Vietnam National Police (Vietnamese: Cảnh Sát Quốc Gia – CSQG) from 1962 to 1975.

== Role ==
The CSHC assisted in the issuing of passports, visas, national identification cards, radio licenses, price controls, and weapons permits.

== See also ==
- ARVN
- First Indochina War
- List of weapons of the Vietnam War
- Republic of Vietnam
- Republic of Vietnam Military Forces
- Vietnam War
