= Republic of Vietnam National Police VIP Protection Service =

The Republic of Vietnam National Police VIP Protection Service (Vietnamese: Công an Quốc Gia Việt Nam Đóng dịch vụ bảo mật), also designated 'Close Protection Service' (Vietnamese: Đóng dịch vụ bảo mật) or 'Service de Securité Rapprochée' in French, was the close protection unit of the Republic of Vietnam National Police (Vietnamese: Cảnh Sát Quốc Gia – CSQG) from 1962 to 1975.

== See also ==
- ARVN
- Central Intelligence Agency (CIA)
- First Indochina War
- List of weapons of the Vietnam War
- Phoenix Program
- Republic of Vietnam
- Republic of Vietnam Military Forces
- Vietnam War
