= Republic of Vietnam River and Coastal Police =

Republic of Vietnam National River and Coastal Police Lực Lượng Giang Cảnh
- Flag of the Republic of Vietnam National River and Coastal Police
- Active: 1965 – 30 April 1975
- Country: South Vietnam
- Allegiance: Republic of Vietnam
- Branch: Republic of Vietnam National Police
- Type: Water police
- Role: Brown-water navy Close-quarters combat Counterinsurgency; Counterintelligence; Direct fire Force protection HUMINT; Jungle warfare Law enforcement Naval boarding Raiding; Reconnaissance
- Size: 2,404 men, 380 river and inshore patrol craft (at height in 1971)
- Headquarters: Phú Xuân
- Nicknames: LLGC (RCP in English); Riverine Force
- Engagements: Tet Offensive; Phú Quốc Island; Fall of Saigon

Commanders
- Notable commanders: (Unknown)

The River and Coastal Police – RCP, officially designated Riverine Force (Vietnamese: Lực Lượng Giang Cảnh – LLGC) or River Police (Vietnamese: Giang Cảnh), also variously known as Marine Police and 'Police Nautique' or 'Police Fluviale et Côtière' in French, was the "naval" branch of the Republic of Vietnam National Police (Vietnamese: Cãnh Sát Quốc Gia – CSQG), active from 1965 to 1975.

== History ==
The RCP was officially established in 1965 by the south Vietnamese government to provide a waterborne law-enforcement capability to assist the CSQG in countering Viet Cong (VC) activity on the more than 3,000 miles of navigable inland waterways. This effort was directed primarily at the Mekong Delta area. The RCP had responsibility for control and maintenance of security on navigable waterways and sea ports in the Republic of Vietnam, the support of resources control, the enforcement of civil and maritime law, and assistance in other police activities.

== Structure ==
Headquartered at Phú Xuân, near Huế in Thừa Thiên Province, the RCP had an initial strength of 350 men, who operated 100 river patrol boats from three bases in the Mekong delta and patrolled 40 miles of waterways by late 1966. The RCP was placed in 1969 under the control of the Field Police Command (Vietnamese: Cãnh Sát Dã Chiên – CSDC) co-located to the CSQG Headquarters at Saigon. By 1970–71, it had grown to a force of 2,404 men operating from 22 riverine and coastal bases located in all of the four Military Regions, patrolling 440 miles of waterways and the sea coast in 380 river and inshore patrol craft. Boat crews were trained at the Riverine Force Training Centre (Vietnamese: Trung tâm huấn luyện lực lượng sông nước) co-located at their Phú Xuân HQ, which also housed the Police repair yard.

== See also ==
- Brown Water Navy
- First Indochina War
- Junk Force
- List of weapons of the Vietnam War
- Republic of Vietnam
- Republic of Vietnam Military Forces
- Republic of Vietnam Navy
- South Vietnamese Regional Forces
- Vietnam War
