= Australian Army Training Team Vietnam =

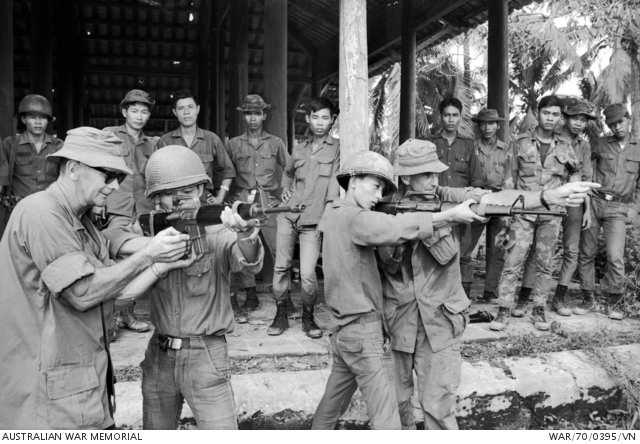
- AATTV advisers instruct South Vietnamese Regional Forces on the M16 rifle in Ben Tranh District, June 1970
- Active: 31 July 1962 – 16 February 1973
- Country: Australia
- Branch: Australian Army
- Type: Military advisors
- Role: Counter-insurgency; Military education and training
- Size: ~30–227 men
- Part of: Australian Force Vietnam
- Garrison/HQ: Saigon, South Vietnam
- Nicknames: "The Team" "The Expendables"
- Motto: "Persevere"
- Engagements: Battle of Duc Lap; Battle of Kham Duc
- Decorations: Meritorious Unit Commendation (United States); Vietnam Gallantry Cross Unit Citation (South Vietnam)

Commanders
- Notable commanders: F.P. Serong

The Australian Army Training Team Vietnam (AATTV) was a specialist unit of military advisors of the Australian Army that operated during the Vietnam War. Raised in 1962, the unit was formed solely for service as part of Australia's contribution to the war, providing training and assistance to South Vietnamese forces. Initially numbering only approximately 30 men, the size of the unit grew several times over the following years as the Australian commitment to South Vietnam gradually grew, with the unit's strength peaking at 227 in November 1970. Members of the team worked individually or in small groups, operating throughout the country from the far south to the Demilitarized Zone (DMZ) in the north. Later they were concentrated in Phước Tuy Province as Australian forces prepared to withdraw from Vietnam. It is believed to be the most decorated Australian unit to serve in Vietnam; its members received over 100 decorations, including four Victoria Crosses, during its existence. The unit was withdrawn from South Vietnam on 18 December 1972 and was disbanded in Australia on 16 February 1973. A total of 1,009 men served with the unit over a period of ten years, consisting of 998 Australians and 11 New Zealanders.

== History ==
=== Formation ===
The Australian Army Training Team Vietnam (AATTV) was raised in 1962 and initially consisted of approximately 30 officers and warrant officers and was tasked to train and advise units of the Army of the Republic of Vietnam (ARVN) as part of the existing US advisory effort controlled by Military Assistance Advisory Group (MAAG), and later United States Military Assistance Command Vietnam (MACV). Most of the advisors were career officers and senior NCOs, with the majority from the infantry, SAS or Commandos, although there were a number of signalers, engineers and other specialist corps represented. They were hand picked for the task and were considered experts in counter-revolutionary warfare and jungle operations, with many having served in the Malayan Emergency. Due to the nature of service as a combat advisor personnel serving with the AATTV were all mature and experienced soldiers, with an average age of 35.

The Australian government's decision to raise the force was announced on 24 May 1962 and shortly afterwards personnel began concentrating at the Intelligence Centre at Mosman, New South Wales. After initial induction training, the team moved to the Jungle Training Centre at Kokoda Barracks, in Canungra, Queensland, for field training. Initially, the unit was designated the "Australian Army Component – Vietnam" on 1 July 1962, and then the "Australian Army Training Component", but on 12 July 1962, the unit was redesignated the "Australian Army Training Team Vietnam". This was soon abbreviated to "The Team". At the conclusion of pre-deployment training, the 30 advisors departed Australia from Mascot, New South Wales, aboard a Qantas charter flight on 29 July 1962. The unit's first commanding officer, Colonel Ted Serong, arrived in Saigon on 31 July – the date that is mistakenly considered the unit's "birthday" – and the main body arrived three days later. (Note: According to Davies and McKay, 31 July is "mistakenly celebrated as the units birthday" because the unit was raised on the Order of Battle on 1 July 1962 and served in Australia prior to deploying to Vietnam.) Serong would later be seconded, and in one capacity or another would remain in Vietnam until the Fall of Saigon in April 1975, serving as a senior advisor to both the US and South Vietnamese governments.

=== Operations ===
On arrival, the unit joined a large group of US advisors and were dispersed across South Vietnam in small groups. Three groups were dispatched to South Vietnam's northern provinces, training members of the ARVN at the National Training Centre at Dong Da near Phu Bai Combat Base and South Vietnamese Regional Forces (RF) at Hiep Khanh northwest of Huế, while a fourth was based at the Ranger Training Centre at Dục Mỹ Camp near Nha Trang in the south; a headquarters was established in Saigon. The groups began training the Vietnamese in barracks, providing instruction in "jungle warfare techniques and technical areas such as signals and engineering". The jungle-warfare methods practiced by the AATTV emphasised patrolling and contact drills which taught soldiers to react automatically in battle with the aim of providing them with an advantage over an enemy which was reliant on command. Initially, the team was prevented from actively taking part in combat operations, and while this restriction was later lifted, until this occurred, the advisors deployed on operations as observers only.

Over time the role and of the AATTV changed, and in addition to training, individuals would often command units, advise South Vietnamese personnel and officials, serve as staff on headquarters and determine policy. On 1 June 1963, Sergeant William Francis Hacking became the AATTV's first casualty when he was accidentally killed while on duty. In late 1963 members of the team were redeployed into combat advisory roles, with two officers and eight NCOs working with Special Forces teams involved in counter-insurgency operations by February 1964. In mid-1964, the restriction on the AATTV advisors taking part in combat operations was lifted. The first advisor officially killed in action was Warrant Officer Class Two Kevin Conway at the Battle of Nam Dong on 6 July 1964. With the war escalating the AATTV increased, first to 60 in June and then to approximately 100 personnel – 15 officers and 85 warrant officers – by December. Soon its area of operations stretched from the far south to the Demilitarized Zone (DMZ) forming the border between North Vietnam and South Vietnam in the north.

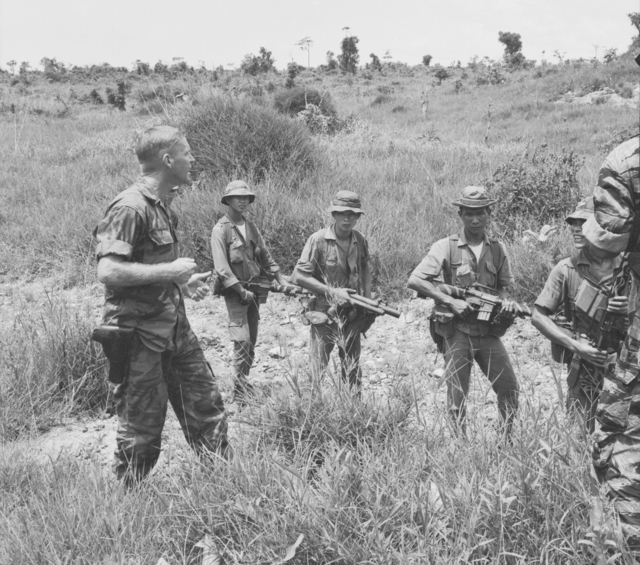
A member of the AATTV speaking with South Vietnamese soldiers undergoing field training in Phuoc Tuy Province during 1968

After June 1964, members of the team were involved in many combat operations, often leading formations of Vietnamese soldiers. Some advisors worked with regular ARVN units and formations – at first mainly infantry, but after 1967 artillery and cavalry units as well – while others, such as Captain Barry Petersen, worked with the Montagnard hill tribes in conjunction with US Special Forces (USSF). A few were attached to Provincial Reconnaissance Units with whom they became involved in the controversial Phoenix Program run by the US Central Intelligence Agency, which was designed to target the Vietcong infrastructure through infiltration, arrest and assassination. Others were attached to the all-Vietnamese RF and Popular Forces and the National Field Police Force, or served with the USSF Mobile Strike Force. Members of the AATTV served tours of duty of between 12 and 18 months in Vietnam.

In mid-1965, Australia's involvement in the war increased as the government committed a full infantry battalion, the 1st Battalion, Royal Australian Regiment. By mid 1966 Australia's contributions had expanded, resulting the formation of the 1st Australian Task Force (1 ATF), operating in its own area of operations in Phước Tuy Province, which was in the III Corps Tactical Zone (III CTZ). But despite the concentration of Australian forces, the AATTV members remained dispersed, often serving with only one other advisor, either Australian or American. Unlike 1 ATF, the majority of team members were deployed in I CTZ and the Central Highlands, where the fighting was often of a higher tempo and more protracted. Thus, due to its small size and widespread area of operations, it was rare for the entire AATTV to be in the same place at the same time; this usually occurred only on ANZAC Day – the only other occasion the whole unit paraded together was when it received the Meritorious Unit Commendation from COMUSMACV on 30 September 1970.

From October 1970 a small group of New Zealanders, consisting of one officer and four SNCOs, were attached to the AATTV. That year, as the Australians, New Zealanders, and Americans prepared to withdraw, a process of Vietnamization began, and the AATTV established a jungle training centre in Phuoc Tuy Province. Some members of the AATTV also served in Mobile Advisory and Training Teams (MATTs) operating within Phuoc Tuy Province at this time. In November 1970, the unit's strength peaked at 227, at which time the team was expanded with an intake of corporals. In 1971, the 1 ATF combat units were withdrawn and the AATTV reverted to their original role of training only. As the final 1 ATF units left the country in early 1972 the AATTV, having been reduced to around 70 personnel, remained in Phuoc Tuy to provide training and advisory assistance to the ARVN and to training Cambodian soldiers of the Force Armée Nationale Khmère (FANK). The last Australians left Vietnam in mid-December 1972 – the AATTV left on 18 December – following the election of the Whitlam Labor government. The AATTV had the longest tour of duty of any Australian unit in Vietnam, serving a total of ten years, four months and sixteen days. The unit also had the distinction of being the first Australian unit committed to Vietnam and the last to be withdrawn.

=== Disbandment ===
The unit was disbanded in Australia on 16 February 1973. The AATTV was Australia's most decorated unit of the war, including all four Victoria Crosses awarded during the conflict (awarded to Warrant Officer Class Two Kevin Wheatley, Major Peter Badcoe, Warrant Officer Class Two Rayene Simpson and Warrant Officer Class Two Keith Payne respectively). The unit also received the United States Army Meritorious Unit Commendation and the Vietnamese Cross of Gallantry with Palm Unit Citation. Individuals who served with the 5th Special Forces Group between 1 November 1966 and 31 January 1968 are also entitled to wear the United States Army Presidential Unit Citation. The Valorous Unit Award was also awarded to B-20, 1st Mobile Strike Force Battalion for service between 3–11 April 1970 and a few members of the AATTV are also entitled to this award.

Members of the AATTV received many decorations for their service and the unit "gained the distinction of being probably the mostly highly decorated unit for its size in the Australian Army". According to the Australian War Memorial, AATTV personnel received the following decorations: four Victoria Crosses, two Distinguished Service Orders, three Officers of the Order of the British Empire, six Members of the Order of the British Empire, six Military Crosses, 20 Distinguished Conduct Medals, 15 Military Medals, four British Empire Medals, four Queen's Commendations for Brave Conduct and 49 Mentions in Despatches. In addition, 245 US and 369 South Vietnamese awards were bestowed on unit members and the unit itself also received two unit citations. Because of the nature of the AATTV's work in Vietnam, all members, regardless of their corps, were awarded the Infantry Combat Badge.

Over the course of its service, a total of 1,009 men served with the unit, consisting of 998 Australians and 11 New Zealanders. (Note: Slightly lower figures are provided by McNeill, who lists a total of 1,000 men as having served with the unit, including 990 Australians and 10 New Zealanders.) Many men served multiple tours over the ten years of the unit's existence. During the 10 years that the unit was deployed to Vietnam, it lost 33 personnel killed and 122 wounded. These members are commemorated by a memorial at Kokoda Barracks at Canungra, Queensland. In 2002, the AATTV's badge and an Australian flag were included on a memorial unveiled in North Carolina, in the United States, dedicated to US special forces that served during the war. The unit was "one of the first groups of foreign soldiers to be honoured on a US war memorial". In October 2004, the Australian Army training contingent in Iraq was renamed the "Australian Army Training Team Iraq" in honour of the AATTV.

== Unit badge ==
Unit badge

Although initially the intention was that the AATTV would wear Australian uniforms in order to ensure that Australia's contribution was clearly identifiable, due to infrequent resupply AATTV personnel often wore a mixture of uniforms and equipment drawn from a variety of nations including Australia, Britain, the US, and South Vietnam. In 1966, the AATTV's commanding officer, Lieutenant Colonel Andrew Milner, decided that the unit and its far-flung members needed an identifying unit badge. Warrant Officer Class Two Laurie Nicholson, who had been temporarily attached to AATTV HQ, was instructed by Milner to come up with designs for his consideration. This instruction included no guidelines except that the design had to include the motto Persevere.

Nicholson developed a design that incorporated symbolism representing various facets of the AATTV's service in Vietnam including the Australian advisory relationship with South Vietnam, the co-operative relationship with the USMACV, and the people of South Vietnam to whom Australia was providing military support in their fight against communism. To represent the environment, a green background was chosen. For the nexus with the Republic of Vietnam, the red and yellow colours of their national flag were chosen, and for America, the badge was shaped as a shield similar to that of the US MACV badge. Inspiration for the symbol representing the South Vietnamese people was provided by a crossbow – a weapon which was as iconic in Vietnam as the boomerang was in Australia – which an AATTV member, who had been serving with the Nung tribal people, had left at the unit's headquarters for safe keeping. These symbols of the indigenous peoples of the two nations were chosen to represent all of the peoples of each nation. The AATTV initials were imprinted on the boomerang at the head of the badge and the motto Persevere on a scroll at the base of the badge. Both texts were in red whilst the boomerang and scroll were in yellow.

On the shield version, the AATTV unit name on the boomerang was in block higher case text and the motto on the scroll was in heraldic higher case. On unit correspondence, all text was displayed in block higher case. As the boomerang is a ready-to-use weapon, the crossbow was presented loaded so that both symbolised the AATTV and the ARVN as being ready for action. Each item on the badge, each colour, each item of text and the shape of the shield, in combination, are symbolic of Australia's military traditions, the individual Australian soldier's reputation in combat and, in particular, the AATTV's record of valour. Ironically the crossbow was not a symbol of the Army of the Republic of Vietnam, but a weapon used by the Montagnard and banned by President Ngo Dinh Diem in 1955.

In 1967 Commander Australian Forces Vietnam authorised the patch to be worn on the right shoulder of field uniform as a "theatre-specific" item. An initial batch was subsequently produced using unit funds in Japan, and then later locally in Vietnam. In October 1969 the badge was officially confirmed as a catalogue item, and in September 1969 it was subsequently approved as an item of dress which could be issue at public expense. In 1970 a metallic version of the badge became available, and was worn on a unique "rifle green" beret which was adopted in an attempt to standardise the uniform of members of the team. Produced locally in Vietnam of low quality pressed brass, it was allowed to dull to a dark patina. The beret and badge were initially authorised for wear only in Vietnam, but this decision was later changed by an Army Headquarters Dress Committee authorisation in July 1971 allowing them to be worn by AATTV members in Australia while posted to the unit. In 2012 the Chief of Army, Lieutenant General David Morrison, officially recognised the AATTV unit badge.

== Commanders ==
The following officers commanded the AATTV:

- Colonel F.P. Serong (1962–65);
- Colonel O.D. Jackson (1965);
- Lieutenant Colonel A.V. Preece (1965);
- Lieutenant Colonel R.G.P. St V. McNamara (1965–66);
- Lieutenant Colonel A.J. Milner (1966–67);
- Lieutenant Colonel M.T. Tripp (1967–68);
- Lieutenant Colonel R.L. Burnard (1968–69);
- Lieutenant Colonel R.D.F. Lloyd (1969–70);
- Colonel J.A. Clark (1970–71);
- Colonel G.J. Leary (1971);
- Lieutenant Colonel J.D. Stewart (1971–72);
- Lieutenant Colonel K.H. Kirkland (1972); and
- Lieutenant Colonel P.T. Johnston (1972–73).

== See also ==
- Military history of Australia during the Vietnam War
- Republic of Vietnam National Police Field Force (NPFF)
- Army of the Republic of Vietnam Special Forces (LLDB)
- Khmer Special Forces

== Notes ==
Footnotes

Citations
