= Republic of Vietnam Special Police =

The Special Police (Vietnamese: Cảnh Sát Đặc Biệt – CSĐB) or ‘Police Speciale’ in French, was the Special Branch of the Republic of Vietnam National Police (Vietnamese: Cảnh Sát Quốc Gia – CSQG) from 1962 to 1975. The CSĐB served as an intelligence agency tasked with national security by acquiring and developing intelligence on internal and external threats to the Republic of Vietnam, subversive activities, and prevent acts of sabotage and espionnage.

== History ==
The CSĐB traced back its origins to the Vietnamese section of the Indochinese Sûreté Générale secret police raised by the French Union authorities during the First Indochina War between 1946 and 1954.

== See also ==
- ARVN
- Central Intelligence Agency (CIA)
- First Indochina War
- List of weapons of the Vietnam War
- Phoenix Program
- Republic of Vietnam
- Republic of Vietnam Military Forces
- Vietnam War
