= Republic of Vietnam National Police Medical Service =

The Republic of Vietnam National Police Medical Service (Vietnamese: Dịch vụ y tế Cảnh Sát Quốc Gia Việt Nam) or ‘Service de Santé de la Police’ in French, was the medical support department of the Republic of Vietnam National Police (Vietnamese: Cãnh Sát Quốc Gia – CSQG) from 1962 to 1975.

== See also ==
- ARVN
- First Indochina War
- List of weapons of the Vietnam War
- Republic of Vietnam
- Republic of Vietnam Military Forces
- Vietnam War
