= Republic of Vietnam National Police Field Force =

Republic of Vietnam National Police Field Force Cảnh Sát Dã Chiến
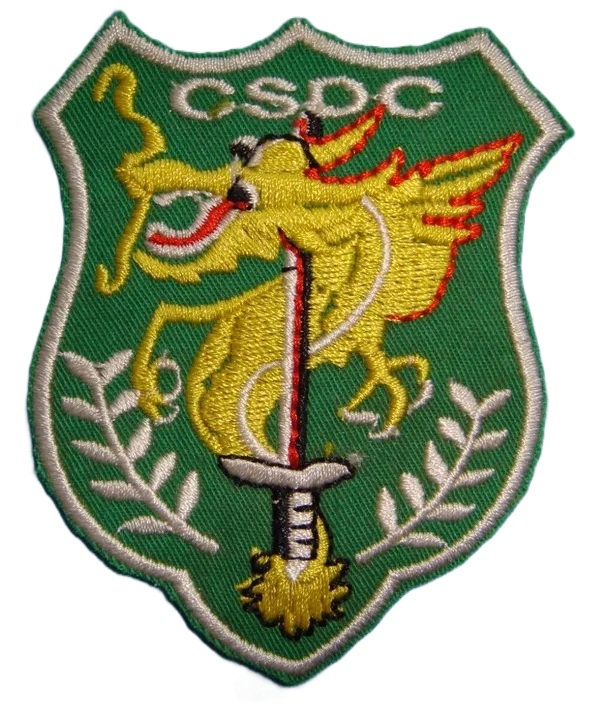
- Republic of Vietnam National Police Field Force shoulder patch (1966-1975)
- Active: 27 January 1966 – 30 April 1975
- Country: South Vietnam
- Allegiance: Republic of Vietnam
- Branch: Republic of Vietnam National Police
- Type: Armed Support Unit (Gendarmerie)
- Size: 16,500 men (at height in 1971)
- Headquarters: Saigon
- Nickname: CSDC (NPFF in English)
- Mottos: Danh Dự (Honor), Trách Nhiệm (Duty)
- Engagements: Tet Offensive; Battle of An Loc; Phú Quốc Island; Fall of Saigon

Commanders
- Notable commanders: Nguyen Van Long

The Republic of Vietnam National Police Field Force (Vietnamese: Cảnh Sát Dã Chiến – CSDC), also designated Police de Campagne by the French and variously as National Police Field Force (NPFF), Field Police or Field Force for short by the Americans, was a paramilitary élite branch of the Republic of Vietnam National Police (Vietnamese: Cảnh Sát Quốc Gia – CSQG). Active during the Vietnam War, the CSDC operated closely with the Army of the Republic of Vietnam (ARVN) and the American Central Intelligence Agency (CIA) from 1966 to 1975.

== Origins ==
The CSDC was created on 27 January 1966 by the South Vietnamese government as an armed support unit for the National Police.

== Role ==
The missions performed by the CSDC went well beyond the normal duties of a civil police force, functionally serving as another branch of the South Vietnamese armed forces, being organized and trained for paramilitary operations in the field on both rural and urban areas. Primarily assigned to counter-insurgency and humint duties, CSDC companies and battalions were also employed in various other tasks such as guarding important public buildings, VIP protection, public security, counterintelligence, riot control, cordon and search, jungle, mountain and urban combat operations.

Between 1967 and 1972, the CSDC was deeply involved in the highly controversial CIA-run Phoenix Program (Vietnamese: Chiến dịch Phụng Hoàng), participating actively in the "neutralization" – which often involved arbitrary arrests without charge, routine torture, and extrajudicial executions – of suspected members of the civil infrastructure or "shadow administration" of the Viet Cong (VC), also known as the "Vietcong Infrastructure" (VCI).

== Composition ==
CSDC members' were usually ethnic Vietnamese National Policemen that volunteered to Field Force service, although the unit also accepted military personnel either transferred or retired from the Army of the Republic of Vietnam (ARVN). The latter included former members of the Army of the Republic of Vietnam Special Forces (Vietnamese: Lực Lượng Đặc Biệt Quân Lực Việt Nam Cộng Hòa – LLDB) following its disbandment in December 1970.

== Structure and organization ==
The Field Police Command Staff reported directly for operational orders to the National Police Command and was co-located to the CSQG Headquarters at Saigon. Under the designation of 'Armed Support Unit' (Vietnamese: Đơn vị hỗ trợ vũ trang), by 1969 the CSDC Command was in charge of the Field Police units and of the River and Coastal Police. Rechristened 'Reaction Unit' (Vietnamese: Đơn vị phản ứng) in 1972, the Field Police Command integrated the Provincial Investigation Force (Vietnamese: Lực lượng điều tra tỉnh) and in 1973 changed again its designation to 'Mobile Operations Department' (Vietnamese: Phòng điều hành di động).

The basic unit of the Field Police was the company (Vietnamese: Dai Đội – DD), organized into a 24-man company headquarters (HQ) and several 40-man combat platoons (Vietnamese: Trung Đội – TRD), each with four 10-man squads (Vietnamese: Tiệu Đội). Until 1968, one company was assigned to each province and main cities and fielded a number of platoons ranging from two to 13 according to the number of rural or urban districts. For example, up to five districts a single company was assigned, but if a province or town counted more than six districts, two companies could be deployed. After 1969, a major re-organization was implemented, with the provincial companies being expanded to battalions (Vietnamese: Tiệu Doàn – TD). By August 1971, the CSDC strength totaled 16,500 officers and enlisted men organized into 44 provincial battalions comprising some 90 companies, 242 district platoons and one independent armoured cavalry platoon. Two independent companies of four platoons each were based respectively at Vũng Tàu and Da Nang, two autonomous port cities which had their own municipal police services separated from the province in which they were located.

To provide supervision and support to all these provincial and urban Field Police units, Regional Headquarters and Service Companies were located at each of the country's four Military Regions. A CSDC company was usually commanded by an Inspector (a Captain after 1971), who came under the operational command of the National Police provincial chief (Vietnamese: Trưởng công an tỉnh) whilst platoons assigned to the districts were firmly under operational control of the district police chief (Vietnamese: Trưởng công an huyện) who, in turn, was directly answerable to the district political chief (Vietnamese: Trưởng phòng chính trị huyện).

=== Armoured car unit ===
A predominantly light infantry force, the CSDC operated a single independent armoured cavalry platoon (Vietnamese: Trung đội kỵ binh độc lập), provided with eight World War II-vintage US M8 Greyhound light armoured cars. Headquartered at Saigon, it was tasked of providing security to the National Police HQ and the adjoining National Bank building and their environs. This unit specialized in patrolling on urban areas and manoeuver warfare.

=== Tactical Mobile Groups ===
In addition, the Field Police maintained two Tactical Mobile Groups – TMG (Vietnamese: Biêt Doàn – BD) totalling 5,000 men and designated BD 5 and BD 222 respectively, which conferred the National Police the capacity to engage independently in either defensive or offensive actions according to its mission of operational defense.

Based at Saigon, BD 5 was in fact an enlarged battalion since it fielded, in addition to one headquarters' (HQ) company, 12 to 14 combat companies of four platoons each. The battalion operated on the wider Saigon-Gia Định region, assigned to the Saigon Municipal Police Directorate (Vietnamese: Tổng cục cảnh sát thành phố Sài Gòn) which was encharged with the internal security and internal defense of the capital. During the Tet Offensive in January 1968 the unit was committed in the defense of President Nguyễn Văn Thiệu's residence, the Independence Palace alongside other National Police and ARVN units, distinguishing itself at the battles for the Tan Son Nhut Air Base, Cholon, the Phu Tho Racetrack and the Cha Tam Church, where they inflicted heavy losses on attacking VC units.

Also headquartered at Saigon, BD 222, a smaller battalion with just six combat companies, was in turn assigned to the General Reserve (Vietnamese: Tổng dự trữ) of the National Police as a quick reaction unit that could be deployed nationwide, being tasked with specific missions and reinforcement duties. Engaged in Saigon during the Tet in 1968, the field policemen of BD 222 succeeded in flushing out the VC "Sappers" (Vietnamese: Đắc Cộng) entrenched in the National Radio Broadcasting Station building, located a few hundred meters away from the American Embassy, but also fought elsewhere. Between 1968 and 1975, the Battalion's combat companies were deployed at various times and locations throughout the country, engaging in defensive and offensive operations in conjunction with other National Police or ARVN units at Huế, Da Nang, Bình Định, Tuyên Duế, Gia Định, Long An, Biên Hòa, and Phú Quốc Island. When the city of An Lộc was besieged in April 1972 during the Easter Offensive by three People's Army of Vietnam (PAVN) armoured divisions, BD 222 was rushed in to bolster the city's defenses and successfully held its ground against repeated assaults by enemy tanks.

=== Police Special Recon Teams ===
Reconnaissance and scouting missions were performed by the Special Recon Teams – SRT (Vietnamese: Trinh Sát Dac Biêt – TSDB). Recruited amongst ethnic minorities such as the Khmer Krom, Nùng or Montagnard hill tribesmen, they were organized into platoon-sized units attached to each CSDC company.

== Training ==
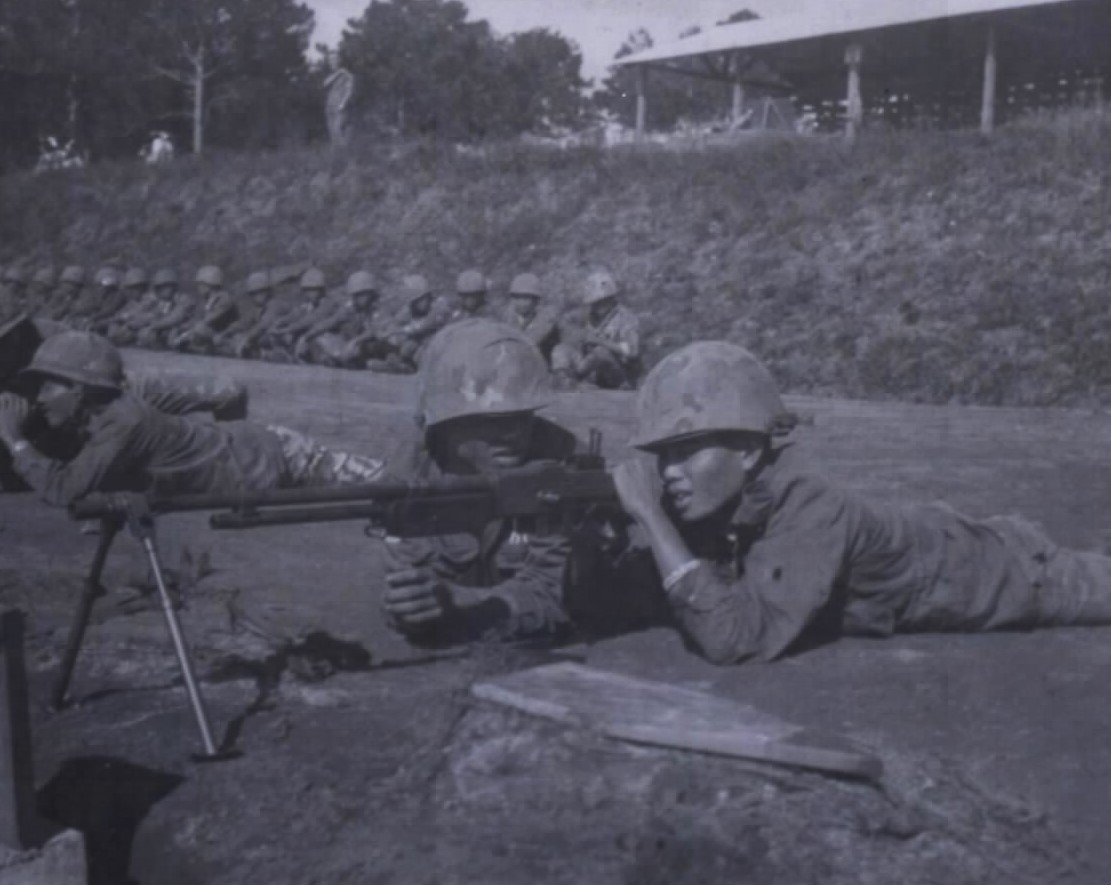
Trainees fire BARs at the National Police Field Forces Training Center, August 22, 1970.

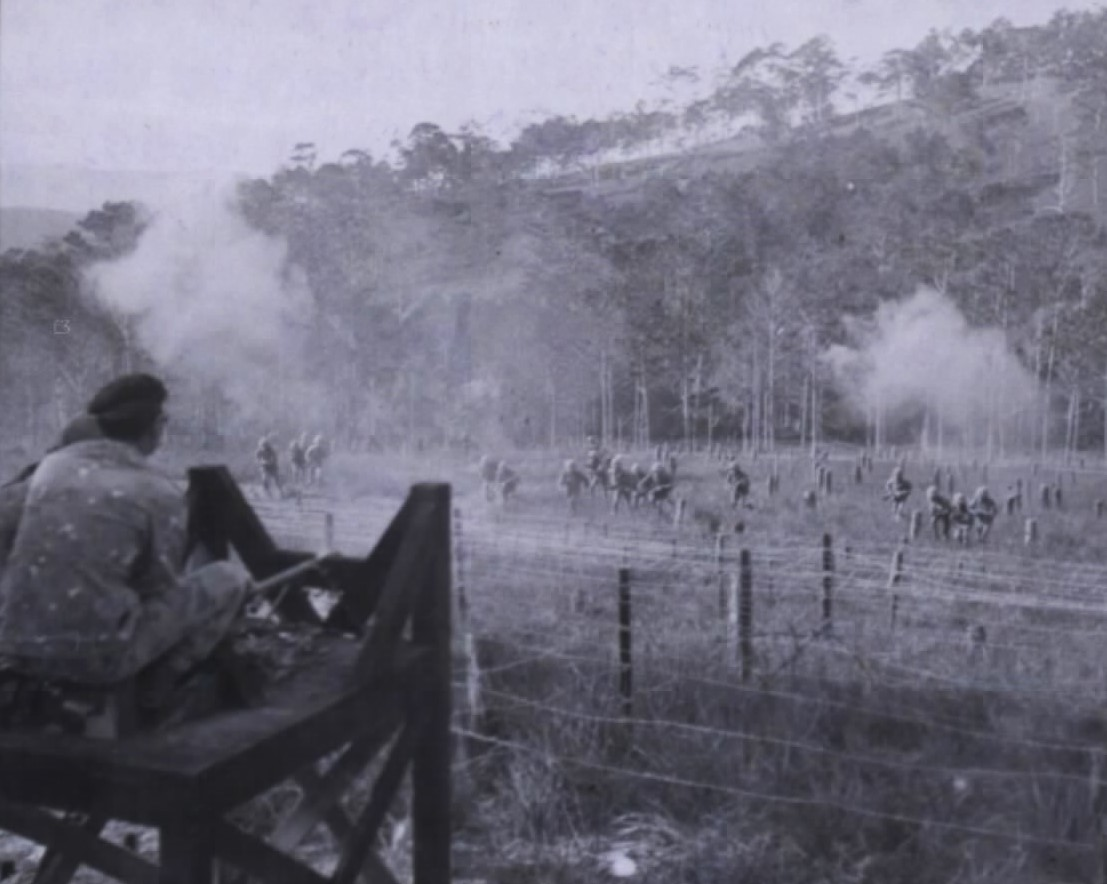
Instructors at the National Police Field Forces Training Center, fire .30 caliber machine guns over the heads of trainees, August 22, 1970.

National Policemen who volunteered to Field Force service, in addition to their basic police instruction, also received advanced paramilitary training. Probatier officers recently graduated by the Saigon Police Academy or the Da Lat Military Academy had to undergo a complete instruction cycle on combat tactics at the ARVN Infantry School for officers in Thủ Đức, Saigon, whilst patrolmen who had completed their basic training at Rach Dua also attended a similar program at the ARVN Combat Training Centre and NCO School co-located at Da Lat. At this stage, all combat training was carried out at squad- and platoon-level, which enabled the recruits to attain a good tactical manoeuver capacity in the field.

Following this, the would-be Field Policemen – including officers and NCOs – underwent further eight weeks' of training in CSDC paramilitary skills at the National Police Training Centres in Malaysia and the Philippines. Instruction covered subjects such as jungle warfare, intelligence-gathering operations, law-enforcement and riot control techniques. To upgrade their capabilities, squads and platoons were returned periodically to these training centres for six weeks of unit refresher training, but for most CSDC companies and battalions posted in the provinces their refresher course actually took place in-country at the regional training centres. Additional military "on the job" training was provided to Field Police units in the field by U.S. Mobile Training Teams or by Australian advisors from the Australian Army Training Team Vietnam (AATTV).

Selected officer students were also sent to the Royal Malaysian Police Field Force Special Training Centre (Malay: Sekolah Latihan Pasukan Polis Hutan; SLPPH) at Kentonmen, Ulu Kinta, Perak in Malaysia to attend advanced specialized police and instructor's courses. After graduation, some of these new National Police officers upon returning to South Vietnam would them be posted as Field Police instructors at the Police training centres to pass on their skills to CSDC recruits.

== List of CSDC Commanders ==
- Lieutenant colonel Nguyen Van Long (?–1975)

== Weapons and equipment ==
The CSDC was lightly armed by military standards, but heavily armed by conventional police standards. Initially, most of its weaponry was surplus World War II/Korean War-vintage – the standard issue weapon was the heavy M1 Garand semi-automatic rifle, complemented by M1/M2 Carbines, M3 and Thompson submachine guns and BAR light machine guns. From 1969, rifles, carbines and submachine guns began to be replaced by the M16 rifle and although the latter became the CSDC's primary weapon, it never displaced entirely the earlier weaponry. In addition, each platoon had an M79 Grenade Launcher and a .30 caliber medium machine-gun. Twenty-four shotguns were available in the company weapons pool. The Field Police had no crew-served weapon systems such as mortars or any other indirect fire weapons.

- United States M1917 revolver
- United States Smith & Wesson Model 10 revolver
- United States Smith & Wesson SW2 Bodyguard .38 Special snub-nose revolver
- United States Colt Cobra .38 Special snub-nose revolver
- United States Smith & Wesson Model 39 pistol
- United States Colt.45 M1911A1 automatic pistol
- United States M1 Garand battle rifle
- United States M1/M2 carbine
- United States M3/M3A1 "Grease Gun" submachine gun
- Israel IMI Uzi submachine gun
- United States M1A1 Thompson submachine gun
- United States M16A1 assault rifle
- United States Ithaca model 37 pump-action shotgun
- United States Stevens model 77E pump-action shotgun
- United States M1918A2 BAR light machine gun
- United States M60 machine gun
- United States Browning M1919A4 .30 cal medium machine gun
- United States M79 grenade launcher

=== Vehicles ===
- United States Willys MB Jeep
- United States Willys M38 MC Jeep
- United States Willys M38A1 MD Jeep
- United States Dodge M37 utility truck
- United States Kaiser Jeep M715 utility truck
- United States M8 Greyhound Light armoured car
- United States V-100 Commando armoured personnel carrier/Internal security vehicle

== Uniforms and insignia ==
Field Police personnel were initially given the same standard ARVN olive green fatigues as the other National Police branches, but from 1967 they began to receive a new 'Leopard' camouflage fatigues, dubbed the 'earth-colour flower' (Vietnamese: Hoa Mâu Dât) uniform by the Vietnamese. This was a locally produced copy of the American-designed Mitchell 'Clouds' camouflage pattern, which incorporated overlapping dark brown, russet, beige, light brown and ochre cloud-shaped blotches on a tan background.

Olive green U.S. M-1951 field jackets or locally made copies in camouflage cloth were issued to Field Police companies operating in the chilly mountain environment of the Central Highlands.

=== Headgear ===
Field Police troopers were distinguished from the rest of the National Police by a black beret made of a single piece of wool attached to a black leather rim-band provided with two tightening-straps at the back. Berets were often carefully molded to achieve a pointed shape or 'Cockscomb crest', affected by so many South Vietnamese military personnel since it reportedly gave the wearer a more imposing figure and aggressive 'Shock trooper' or 'Commando' allure. It was worn French-style pulled to the left, with the National Police cap badge placed above the right eye. Originally intended to be worn with the regulation National Police dress uniform in formal occasions, the beret was sometimes seen in the field but it was often replaced by camouflage jungle hats and US M-1 model 1964 steel helmets, the latter worn with a matching 'Clouds' camouflage cover. A US M-1 Helmet liner painted in shiny black, marked with white-and-red stripes at the sides and the initials "TC" (Vietnamese: Tuấn Chân – patrol) was worn by Field Police troopers assigned patrol duties or riot control in urban areas.

=== Footwear ===
Black leather combat boots were provided by the Americans who issued both the early U.S. Army M-1962 'McNamara' model and the M-1967 model with DMS 'ripple' pattern rubber sole, standard issue in the ARVN. In the field, CSDC troopers generally wore the highly prized U.S. Army Jungle boot and Japanese-produced black canvas-and-rubber Indigenous Combat Boots, or Vietnamese-produced green canvas-and-rubber "Goalong" tropical boots, replaced by commercial plastic or rubber flip-flops and leather peasant sandals while in garrison. Some individuals had zippers put into the insides of their Jungle boots so that they could be laced permanently in a fancy 'airborne' pattern, while the wearer could get into and out of his boots quickly and easily by using the zipper.

=== Insignia ===
Regarding the placement of insignia, the CSDC had a system of its own, originally adapted from their dress uniform. Most CSDC troopers wore no insignia on their field camouflage uniforms while on operations, or sometimes just their Company patch in either cloth or metal versions in a pocket hanger following the French model suspended from the right shirt pocket. Special Recon Teams were issued a round embroidered black patch edged red, with red 'CSQG' and 'TSDB' lettering and winged sword-bayonet pointed down.

== See also ==
- Army of the Republic of Vietnam (ARVN)
- Army of the Republic of Vietnam Special Forces (LLDB)
- Battle of Saigon (1968)
- Central Intelligence Agency (CIA)
- Civilian Irregular Defense Group program (CIDG)
- Directorate of National Coordination (Laos)
- General Operations Force (Malaysia)
- List of weapons of the Cambodian Civil War
- List of weapons of the Laotian Civil War
- List of weapons of the Vietnam War
- MIKE Force
- Phoenix Program
- Provincial Reconnaissance Units (PRUs)
- Republic of Vietnam Military Forces
- Royal Lao Police
- Royal Thai Police Aerial Reinforcement Unit (PARU)
- Royal Malaysian Police
- South Vietnamese Regional Forces
- Vietnam War
