= Junk Force =

Vietnamese naval security unit

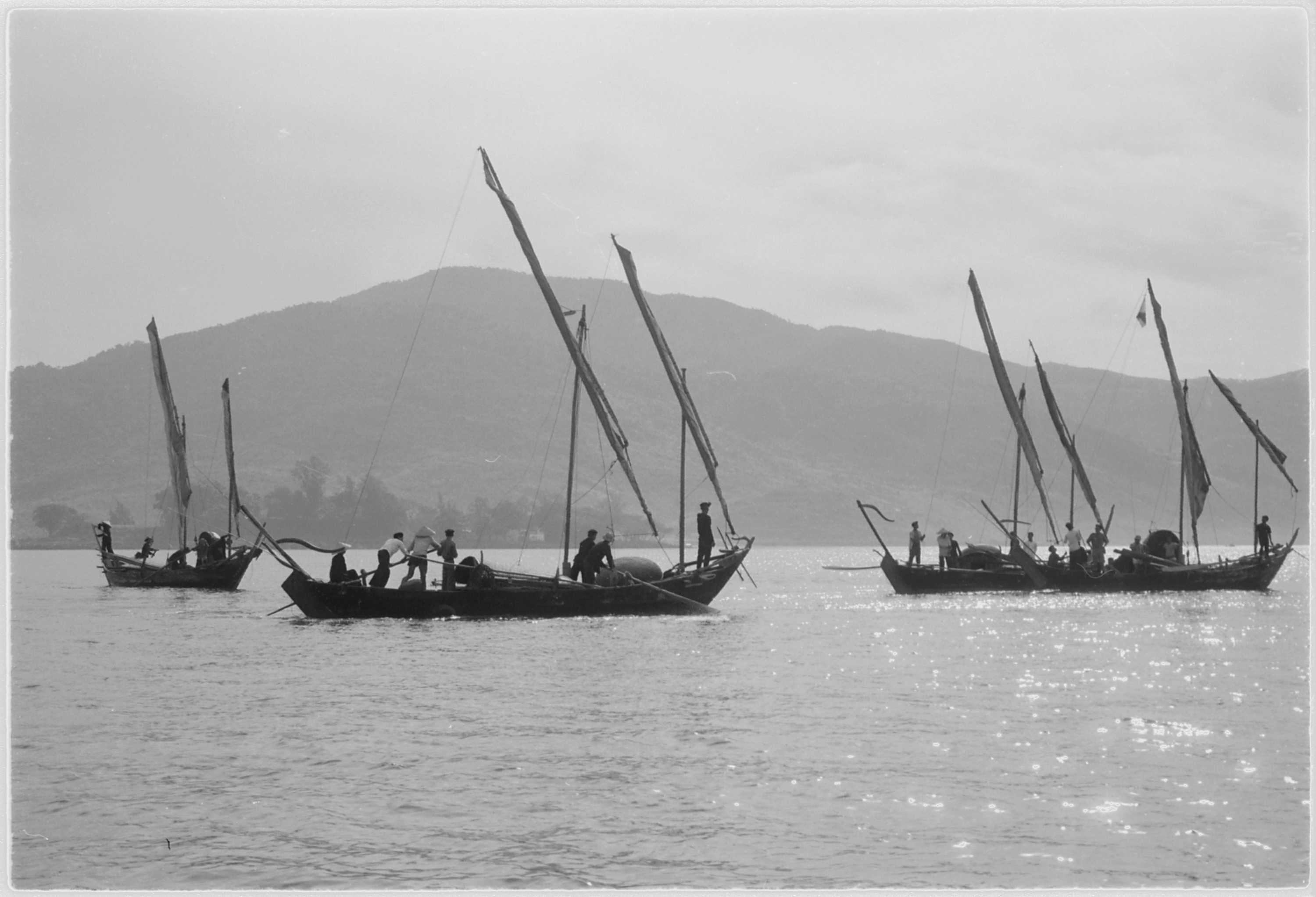
Junk Force at anchor, 1962

The Junk Force (Vietnamese: Lực Lượng Hải Thuyền) officially the Coastal Force was a naval security unit of the Republic of Vietnam, composed of civilians trained by the Navy and working in conjunction with the Republic of Vietnam National Police. The Force was formed in 1960, and integrated into the Republic of Vietnam Navy (RVNN) in 1965.

== History ==
=== Establishment ===
The genesis of the Coastal Force dates to April 1960, when Admiral Harry D. Felt, Commander in Chief, U.S. Pacific Command (CINCPAC), recommended that the RVNN assume a larger role in curbing the flow of enemy supplies coming into South Vietnam from the sea. Partly because of this recommendation, President Ngo Dinh Diem established the Coastal Force, often referred to as the "junk force", as an autonomous unit directly under South Vietnam's Department of State for National Defense. The idea of a coastal force as a paramilitary unit fit in well with the Kennedy administration's belief that self-defense units represented one of the best means of fighting the Viet Cong (VC) insurgency. Consequently, the administration ordered the Defense Department to support the new force by funding the construction of 501 junks by South Vietnamese shipyards.

The original plan for the Coastal Force, written by RVNN Commander Hồ Tấn Quyền, called for 420 sailing junks and 63 motorized junks, crewed by 2,200 civilian irregulars drawn from local fishing villages, to patrol the inshore coastal waters up to 5 miles (8.0 km) from the coast. Quyền hoped that his force would blend in naturally with coastal fishing junks, allowing his units to keep their true identity secret until they drew up to a suspect junk for a search and boarding mission. The plan called for creating 21 junk divisions (also known as coastal divisions), each with 23 junks. Every division would patrol a 30 miles (48 km) stretch of the South Vietnamese coastline, and their operations would be coordinated by radio from coastal command surveillance centers. Coastal divisions, in turn, reported to one of four VNN coastal districts. These districts were headquartered in Danang (I), Nha Trang (II), Vung Tau (III) and An Thoi (IV), and each district commander controlled all naval forces operating within his district. On 16 October 1963, the advisory team persuaded the RVNN to create four naval zone commands, from the 1st Naval Zone in the north to the 4th Naval Zone in the Gulf of Thailand. Thereafter, an overall commander whose area of responsibility now corresponded with that of an army corps commander controlled operations of the Sea Force, River Force and Coastal Force in a particular zone.

=== Conditions of service and vessels ===
By the end of 1963, the junk force had grown to 632 junks and 3,700 civilian crewmembers. From its inception, however, problems beset the fledgling organization. Recruiting sailors for the new force proved more difficult than expected. Vietnamese fishermen made an adequate living from the sea during this period and had little interest in joining the junk force. The RVNN instead recruited urban peasants and refugees from the north. With no seafaring tradition, these northerners were prone to leave or desert the service at first opportunity. Enlistments rarely kept up with attrition, which averaged over 106 sailors per month during 1963–1964. Desertion and absent-without-leave rates also were high due to the deplorable conditions under which these men served.

A February 1963 survey of the men in the Fourth Coastal District found that over 500 of the 657 men on duty in the unit had not received any pay in the past six months, and none had ever received any formal training. "Many men on the junks at this time had never fired a gun or been on a junk before... Needless to say, morale was non-existent and approximately 50 men per week were deserting.” A 1964 study by the Naval Advisory Group Saigon confirmed these observations, stating that the root cause of the problem was poor pay and benefits for junk force sailors.Not only were these men paid meager wages, but commands rarely received funds for messing, berthing, and basic medical care for the sailors. In a medical survey of Junk Division 33 in 1963, one advisor found that over 50 percent of the junkmen had some type of treatable disease. Many illnesses resulted from unsanitary water because his coastal division lacked funds for water treatment tablets (iodine). Only 30 percent of the junkmen had received a tetanus shot and just 15 percent, regular doses of chloroquine, a malaria prophylaxes.

Wooden junks required much more maintenance than planned because they were prone to infestations of marine worms and rot. A RVNN/USN survey conducted in May 1964 found that 174 junks were sidelined for repairs, and 64 others were beyond repair. In the Fourth Coastal District, 98 of the 121 junks were out of commission because of maintenance problems. The Vietnamese government deserved much of the blame for these problems because it tended to fund continued expansion of the force at the expense of maintenance for existing units, but lack of regular preventative maintenance on the part of the naval units was also to blame.

=== Operations ===
Operationally, the work of the junk force was not only tedious but dangerous. Motorized VC junks often out-sailed and out-gunned the force's many sailing junks; their wooden hulls offered little protection from VC bullets. In the shallow waters of canals and tributaries, junks often could not follow the smaller VC sampans. Several attempts to augment the junk patrols with Republic of Vietnam Air Force (RVNAF) surveillance aircraft foundered because of the unavailability of aircraft and communications difficulties between aircraft and junks.

In spite of its many problems, the junk force generated impressive statistics. During 1963 alone, the Coastal Force and the Sea Force, a deepwater force of larger vessels, checked 127,000 junks and 353,000 fishermen. Additionally, the Coastal Force detained 2,500 VC suspects, and the Sea Force, another 500.

Following the Vũng Rô Bay incident in February 1965 when a North Vietnamese 130 feet (40 m) long steel-hulled freighter manage to slip through RVNN's coastal patrols and it took the RVNN (with Army of the Republic of Vietnam (ARVN) and RVNAF support) over four days to secure the area and seize the ship's goods, a report on the RVNN found that the Junk Force's personnel were "by and large, illiterate," operating "under the most difficult living conditions and on an extremely austere basis." In addition to suffering nearly constant maintenance problems, the force's inadequate wooden junks could not pursue the faster motorized junks, not to mention steel trawlers like Ship 145. Many of the Junk Division bases also were situated in VC-dominated areas with little or no local security forces. Lines of communication within the force were "almost negligible."

In 1965, the state of the coastal junk force was worse. Although this force patrolled the vital inner barrier of the Operation Market Time blockade and was responsible for controlling vast stretches of the coastline, it was in many respects the weakest link in the chain. On average, less than 40 percent of the force was on patrol at any given time with the remaining 60 percent either undergoing repairs or inoperative due to manpower shortages, base defense requirements, or lack of aggressiveness. North of Vung Tau, the VC controlled approximately 142 miles (229 km) of the 591 miles (951 km) coastline and south of that town, 300 miles (480 km) of the 400 miles (640 km) coast. In many instances the Coastal Force bases were little more than government islands in a sea of hostile territory.

At the beginning of 1965, the Coastal Force consisted of 526 junks assigned to 28 Coastal Force divisions spread out along the entire coast of South Vietnam. The force included 81 command, 90 motor-sail, 121 motor-only, and 234 sail-only junks. The command junks were relatively capable vessels. Armed with one .50-caliber and two .30-caliber machine guns, these 54 feet (16 m) junks could reach a maximum speed of 12 knots—more than adequate to intercept similar vessels used by the VC. The 31 feet (9.4 m) sail-only junks, on the other hand, were more of a liability than an asset. Their small three- to five-man crews carried nothing but small arms and had no hope of stopping motorized blockade runners. Beginning in 1964 the Naval Advisory Group recommended that all of these junks be stricken from the fleet; 134 were retired during 1965, with the remainder scheduled to go in early 1966. To replace them, the Saigon Naval Shipyard built 90 "Yabuta" junks during 1965. Mr. Yabuta, a Japanese engineer at the Saigon Naval Shipyard in 1961, originally designed the 57 feet (17 m) junk. Armed with a .30-caliber machine gun, it featured a 110-horsepower diesel engine capable of generating ten knots of speed and was built entirely out of fiberglass, which obviated the need to treat the hulls for wood-boring Teredo worms. Wooden junks, by contrast, needed to have their hulls scraped, blow-torched and resealed every three months. The U.S. Military Assistance Program provided funds for building materials and engines, and the Vietnamese paid the wages of the shipyard laborers who built the junks. After the first Yabutas were completed, output slowed significantly. In 1966 the Saigon Naval Shipyard built only nine junks and in 1967, just 15. Production went from three junks a week in 1965 to one every five weeks in 1967 as private construction firms lured shipyard workers away with salaries, on average, three times higher than what the government had paid them.

Between 28 March and 17 April 1965 Task Force 71 reported 14,962 junks in its area of operation. Forty percent of these were within 3 miles (4.8 km) of the South Vietnamese coast, and the remaining 60 percent between 3 and 40 miles (64 km) from the coastline. The RVNN inspected 2.5 percent of the former contacts and 7 percent of the latter. Clearly, the Coastal Force could not keep up with the flow of contacts being reported by TF 71 units. Of the 530 junks assigned to Market Time from the Coastal Force, only 33.7 percent were utilized in patrols during this same period, and only half of the 44 assigned Sea Force ships participated. In a report to the Chief of Naval Operations, Vice Admiral Paul P. Blackburn, the United States Seventh Fleet commander, summarized the situation as follows: "The VNN Coastal and Sea Forces effort in Market Time Operations has degenerated to the point where it is effectively non-existent. . . . We must recognize that this US/VNN anti-infiltration chain is no stronger than its weakest link." Ultimately, some of the problems with the Coastal Force were alleviated by integrating it into the regular navy in July 1965, but the sorry state of the service as a whole continued throughout 1965.

By 1967 the Coastal Force consisted of 27 coastal groups located at 22 sites spread out along the coast of South Vietnam. Each base consisted of approximately 10 junks and 148 sailors. The men, most of whom had just a few years of grade school education, lived in primitive conditions far from the comforts of larger towns or cities.

== See also ==
- Brown Water Navy
- Republic of Vietnam
- Republic of Vietnam River and Coastal Police
- Republic of Vietnam Military Forces
- Republic of Vietnam Navy
- Vietnam War
- Weapons of the Vietnam War
