= Republic of Vietnam Traffic Control Police =

The Traffic Control Police or "Road Police" (Vietnamese: Cảnh Sát Công Lộ – CSCL), "Police de la Route" or simply "Circulation" in French and nicknamed the "white mice" due to their all-white service uniforms, was the traffic regulation branch of the Republic of Vietnam National Police (Vietnamese: Cảnh Sát Quốc Gia – CSQG). During the Vietnam War, the Traffic Control Police operated closely with the ARVN Military Police Corps from 1962 to 1975.

== Uniforms and insignia ==
Traffic Control Police agents were given an all-white cotton service uniform consisting of a long-sleeved shirt and trousers, worn with a matching white peaked cap; the shirt had dark blue removable shoulder boards and badges and other insignia were in silvered metal.

== See also ==
- ARVN Military Police
- First Indochina War
- List of weapons of the Vietnam War
- Phoenix Program
- Republic of Vietnam
- Republic of Vietnam Military Forces
- South Vietnamese Regional Forces
- Vietnam War
