= Republic of Vietnam Judiciary Police =

The Judiciary Police or Justice Police (Vietnamese: Cảnh Sát Tư Pháp – CSTP), ‘Police Judiciaire’ in French, was the plainclothes Criminal Investigation Department (CID) or Detective branch of the Republic of Vietnam National Police (Vietnamese: Cảnh Sát Quốc Gia – CSQG) from 1962 to 1975.

== See also ==
- ARVN
- Central Intelligence Agency (CIA)
- First Indochina War
- List of weapons of the Vietnam War
- Phoenix Program
- Republic of Vietnam
- Republic of Vietnam Military Forces
- Vietnam War
