= Provincial Reconnaissance Unit =

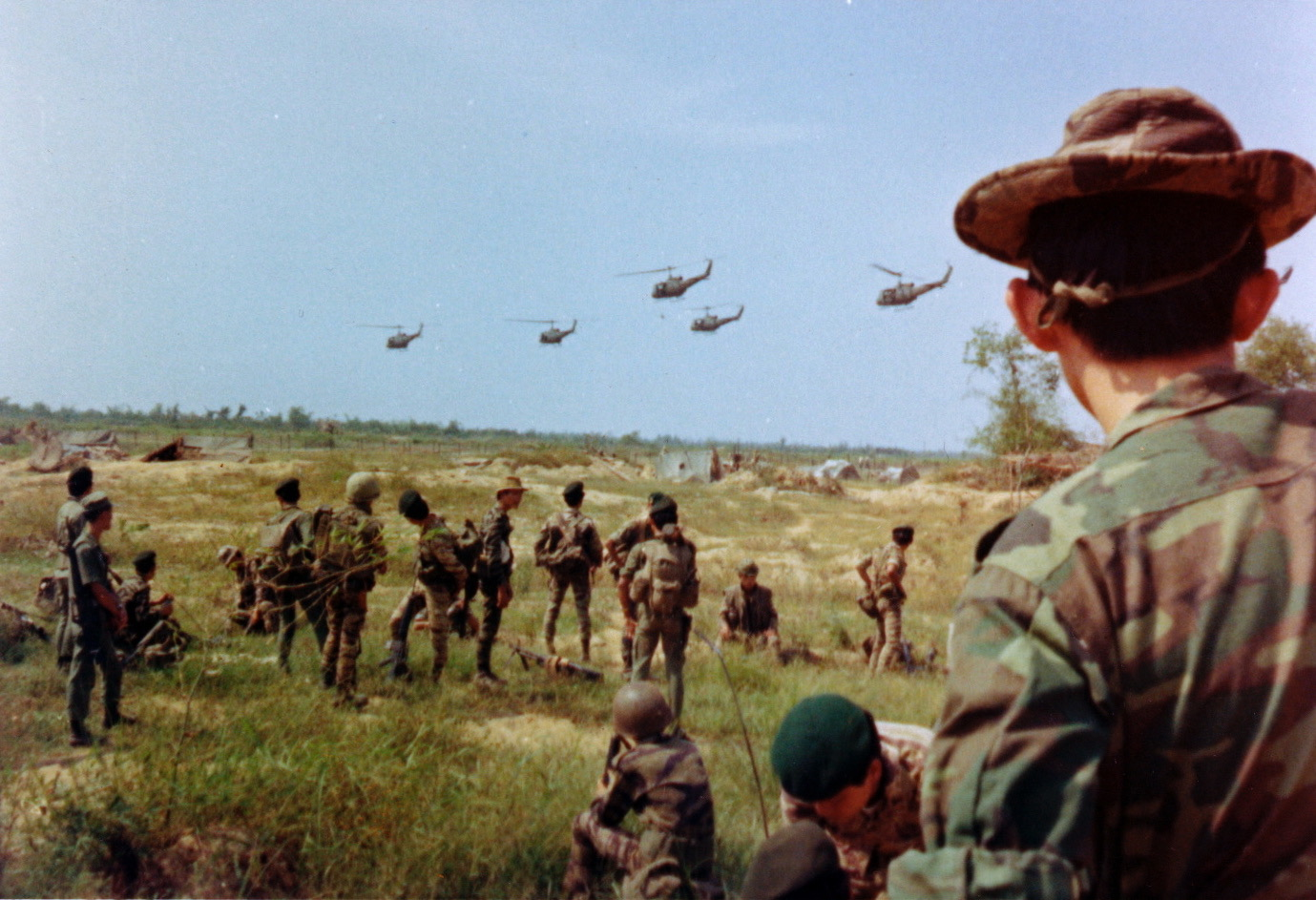
- A Provincial Reconnaissance Unit deploys on Go Noi Island, south of Danang, 1969
- Active: 1967 – 1973
- Disbanded: 1973
- Country: South Vietnam
- Type: Paramilitary police
- Engagements: Vietnam War

The Provincial Reconnaissance Units (PRUs) (Vietnamese: Thám sát Tỉnh) were South Vietnamese special paramilitary units, led by U.S. military and Central Intelligence Agency (CIA) personnel. The PRU was tasked with finding and neutralizing Vietcong (VC) cadre and their political leadership under the Phoenix Program during the Vietnam War. The PRU’s preferred method was to capture and interrogate Viet Cong insurgents.

== History ==
=== Structure ===
The PRUs served in both an investigatory function and as a paramilitary force to attack VC infrastructure. Before 1967 the PRUs existed at the provincial level and less than half of the provinces in South Vietnam had such units. They ranged in size from 30 to 300 men, depending on the size of the province and the need for their services by the provincial chiefs and the CIA. District Intelligence and Operation Coordinating Centers (DIOCC) would be staffed by representatives from the CIA’s Census Grievance, PRU, Rural Development and Police Special Branch, along with the National Police and Military Security Service. They would be run by the district chief’s S-2 and advised by an American officer. Many of the early PRU units were organized along strictly military lines since they were often employed in military operations against main force VC units. In 1967, when Civil Operations and Rural Development Support (CORDS) took over operation of the PRU program, the CIA decided to give the PRU a countrywide presence and a standard table of organization for a PRU team. It was decided that each PRU team would consist of 18 men broken down into three six-man squads. The senior squad leader in each team became the team leader. The idea was to assign an 18-man PRU team to each district so the team could react quickly to any targets identified by the DIOCC in that district. In theory, each province would be given enough PRU teams for one to be assigned to each DIOCC. This new organization went into effect in late 1967 and was maintained until the PRUs were integrated into the National Police in 1973. This new national-level PRU organization resulted in most districts receiving an 18-man PRU team, which meant that small provinces with only a few districts or no districts had fewer than 50 PRU members assigned while larger, more populous provinces with many districts had as many as 300 PRU members assigned. In total, 4,000 to 6,000 Vietnamese PRU personnel were assigned countrywide to the program during the years 1967 to 1973.

A typical post-1967 provincial PRU organization was the one found in Tây Ninh Province in III Corps. In this organization, each of the four districts in Tây Ninh Province was assigned an 18-man PRU team and an additional 18-man team was assigned to the capital of the province as a “city team” that could mount operations in the densely populated Tây Ninh or be used to reinforce one or more of the district teams. A very small headquarters cell consisting of the South Vietnamese PRU commander; his deputy, who was also the leader of the Tây Ninh PRU team; and an operations/intelligence officer provided the staff planning and interagency coordination for the province. According to the Marines assigned to the PRU, this form of organizational structure worked well despite the paucity of personnel assigned to staff duties.

=== Recruitment ===
The recruitment of PRU personnel varied from province to province. Many PRU members were former VC or former Army of the Republic of Vietnam (ARVN) soldiers. Some were former Special Forces soldiers or former members of a Citizen Irregular Defense Group (CIDG), while a few were simply local youths who did not want to join the regular ARVN and preferred to serve their country in their own home province. In a few provinces, some paroled criminals were allowed to join the PRU, but the number of such people was few and greatly reduced after 1968. Some had strong religious and community affiliations that made them natural enemies of the VC, such as Catholics, Cao Dai, Hòa Hảo and Montagnard tribesmen. Most PRU members were strongly motivated by their hatred of the VC. Since there were many people in every province who had a grudge against the VC, there were many South Vietnamese who were eager to join the PRU and this made them a very formidable force and one that made it very difficult for the VC to infiltrate or proselytize. According to Colonel Terence M. Allen, the senior military advisor to the PRU Program in Saigon from 1968 to 1970, the most effective PRU teams were those who were recruited among the Cao Dai and Catholic religious communities and the Montagnard tribes since these groups had a visceral hatred of the VC and a vested interest in protecting their communities from the ravages inflicted on them by the VC.

=== Uniforms and equipment ===
PRU teams were equipped with an assortment of uniforms, weapons, and equipment. Most PRU members dressed in the black pajamas worn by Vietnam’s peasants or tiger-striped camouflage uniforms when they went to the field, but some units actually used VC/People’s Army of Vietnam (PAVN) grey or light green uniforms when such uniforms gave them a tactical advantage. In garrison, most PRU members wore either civilian clothes or the standard PRU tiger-striped camouflage uniform. This wide variety of uniforms made it difficult for both the enemy and friendly units to identify them. Therefore, it was essential that the U.S. PRU advisors coordinate closely with friendly units if the PRU were to operate in areas where U.S. and ARVN units were located. The Marine PRU advisors normally wore black pajamas or tiger-striped camouflage uniforms in the field and civilian clothes while in garrison. Some advisors even wore civilian clothes on PRU operations but this was rare.

Weapons consisted primarily of M16 rifles, 45-caliber pistols, M79 grenade launchers and M60 machine guns. However, many PRU units maintained extensive armories of captured weapons, and they often used these in operations against the VC. The PRUs found it convenient to equip some of their men with AK-47 rifles and RPG grenade launchers, so any VC encountered during an operation in enemy territory would initially think they were fellow VC. This gave the PRUs a distinct tactical advantage in any engagement. Other weapons that were employed by PRU members and their advisors were Browning 9mm automatic pistols, Colt Cobra revolvers, Browning Automatic Rifles (BAR), M2 Carbines, Swedish K submachine guns and Bren machine guns. This wide assortment of weapons posed a logistical challenge to some PRU teams, but in most cases there were never any serious shortages of ammunition. Captured enemy ammunition was readily available, and the CIA supply system was able to obtaining almost any ammunition required for operational use. Ammunition for the PRU was often stored within the CIA “embassy house” compounds or in the various PRU armories throughout the provinces so it could be rapidly issued.

For communications, the PRUs were equipped with the PRC-25 radio and its ancillary equipment. A few PRU units maintained some high frequency radios for long-range communications, but such radios were not standard issue, and most PRUs needed to establish temporary radio relay sites on mountaintops to support their long-range missions. This was especially true in the mountainous areas of I Corps. The PRUs were given their own frequencies for tactical communications. They were wary of the enemy intercepting their radio communications, so they seldom used their radios for the transmission of operational details while they were in garrison, choosing instead to use their radios sparingly and primarily during field operations. The PRUs had neither encrypted communications equipment nor code pads, so communications security was often nonexistent, ad hoc, or rudimentary. One of many valuable assets an American PRU advisor brought with him whenever he accompanied a PRU team to the field was the ability to encode communications; however, the use of encoding materials was not frequently employed during most PRU operations, even those that were accompanied by U.S. PRU advisors. Some PRUs did not use radios on their operations, preferring to maintain complete silence until the mission was completed.

PRU forces were equipped with ground transport in the form of commercial light trucks and motorcycles, which were purchased by the CIA. These trucks and motorcycles were typical of the trucks and motorcycles used by Vietnamese civilians, so their use did not arouse suspicion or draw unwanted attention to them when they were employed by the PRU. It also made repair of these transport assets easy since parts, automotive supplies and repairs could be readily obtained locally. When major repairs were needed, PRU vehicles were taken to the CIA’s automotive repair facility in Saigon. The trucks and motorcycles were never provided in the numbers needed by the PRU. Often, only two to three trucks were given to each province, thus they had to be shared by each district team or kept at province level for use as needed. Most PRU teams suffered because of the lack of organic transport. As a result, the PRUs also used public transportation, such as cyclos and buses, or privately owned motorcycles or bicycles to insert themselves into operational areas. Dressed in civilian clothes and posing as civilian travelers, they were able to blend in with the locals using these modes of transportation until they were near their operational area and ready to engage their targets.

Although most PRU operations did not require U.S. military or ARVN transportation assets, the PRUs did avail themselves of such transport when it was provided to them, usually through the good offices of the Vietnamese province chief, a district U.S. military advisor, or the U.S.PRU advisor. For operations over long distances and in mountainous terrain, the PRUs would rely primarily on U.S. helicopters for insertion and extraction. Most U.S. PRU advisors felt the PRUs would have been even more effective had they possessed additional organic transportation assets, such as three-quarter-ton trucks and motorcycles, and a dedicated helicopter package in each military region. The U.S. PRU advisors stated that they often lost valuable time trying to obtain nonorganic transportation for deep or difficult PRU operations, and these delays often had an adverse impact on the success rate of such operations. Since most PRU targets were fleeting in nature, a timely response, often within 24 hours, was needed to achieve success. The lack of organic or rapidly available transportation assets often meant that the target was gone by the time the transportation had been arranged.

=== Command and control ===
The PRUs were under the operational control of the CIA. However, under an agreement between the GVN and the CIA, the Vietnamese province chiefs were given some control over how and when the PRUs could be used. In some instances, this dual-command relationship caused friction between the local CIA leadership in the province and the province chiefs. The relationship was certainly a violation of the unity of command principle. Theoretically, all PRU operations in a province required both the approval of the Provincial Officer in Charge (POIC), who was the senior CIA officer in the province, and the province chief. In many provinces, the PRUs followed this arrangement, but in some provinces, the CIA disregarded it. Some PRU advisors simply obtained the permission of the POIC and assumed the POIC would get the province chief’s approval. As the program matured, the necessity to fully coordinate PRU arrest orders and operations with the province chiefs became institutionalized.

The PRU command and control authority on the Vietnamese side came down from the president through the Minister of Interior to the province chiefs and finally down to the district chiefs, but this was more administrative than operational since day-to-day operations of the PRUs were planned and executed under direct CIA supervision. In a practical sense, the CIA POICs controlled the PRUs and used the American PRU advisors to ensure the PRU teams were properly employed on counter-VC Infrastructure (VCI) operations. A great deal of authority and independence of action was given to the PRU advisors, often amounting to outright autonomy. Since many POICs were busy with their primary duties, not the least of which was the collection of political and strategic intelligence on the enemy’s Central Office for South Vietnam and the North Vietnamese government, they simply did not have the time to micromanage the PRU advisor. In addition, many POICs lacked military experience or their military experience was dated. This meant that they did not feel they had the technical expertise to plan and control the types of operations the PRUs were conducting and preferred to leave the operational details to the initiative of the American PRU advisors. Because the PRU advisors had a great deal of control over how and when their PRU teams were employed, the job required a level of maturity and sophistication not commonly found among the normal special operations soldier, sailor, or Marine. The American PRU advisors were unanimous in their recommendation that the best men for assignment to this form of duty should be in the age range of 25 to 30 years old and should have obtained at least the equivalent rank of Sergeant (E-5) for enlisted and First lieutenant (O-2) for officers. Ideally, they felt the enlisted advisors should be the equivalent of Gunnery sergeants (E-7) and the officers should be Captains (0–3). The American PRU advisors were also unanimous in their belief that immaturity and emotionalism were two of the most destructive and corrosive characteristics a PRU advisor could possess and, along with a lack of cultural sensitivity, the root causes of most serious problems. The number of U.S. military PRU advisors was small; perhaps no more than 400 were assigned to the program from 1967 to 1971.

== See also ==
- Central Intelligence Agency (CIA)
- Civilian Irregular Defense Groups (CIDG)
- Phoenix Program
