= NLF and PAVN strategy, organization and structure =

Topic in the Vietnam War

A Northern-aided T-54B, which fought in the Ho Chi Minh campaign and famously breached the Independence Palace under the name of the Liberation Army of South Vietnam (LASV). It is being preserved with LASV insignia and colors.

During the Vietnam War, the National Liberation Front of South Vietnam (NLF), and the People's Army of Vietnam (PAVN), used a distinctive land warfare strategy to defeat their South Vietnamese Army of the Republic of Vietnam (ARVN) and American opponents. These methods involved closely integrated political and military strategy – what was called dau tranh – literally "to struggle".

The NLF, also known as the Viet Cong (VC), was an umbrella of front groups, set up by North Vietnam (Democratic Republic of Vietnam (DRV)) to conduct the insurgency in South Vietnam. The NLF also included fully armed formations – regional and local guerrillas, and the People's Liberation Armed Forces (PLAF). The PLAF was the "Main Force" – the Chủ Lực or full-time soldiers of the NLF's military wing. Many histories lump both the NLF and the armed formations under the term "Viet Cong" or "VC" in common usage. Both were tightly interwoven and were in turn controlled by the DRV. Others consider the Viet Cong, or "VC" to primarily refer to the armed elements. The term PAVN (People's Army of Vietnam), identifies regular troops of the North Vietnamese Army or NVA. Collectively, both the southern guerrillas and the regulars from the north were part of PAVN.

Terms such as "NLF" and "VC" or "NVA" and PAVN" are used interchangeably due to their widespread popular usage by both South Vietnamese and American military personnel and civilians, and common usage in standard histories of the Vietnam War.

== Historical development ==
=== Formation of the VC/NLF ===
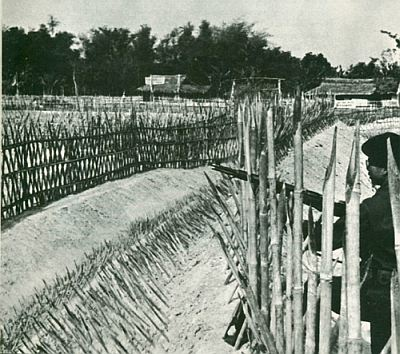
South Vietnamese "fortified hamlet." Early in the war, the VC actually controlled numerous such villages, using them for rest, recruitment and resupply.

The formation of the National Liberation Front (NLF) and People's Army of Vietnam (PAVN) lies in the communist dominated resistance to the French and the State of Vietnam – the Viet Minh. The expulsion of the French had still left a clandestine organization behind in the South, reinforced by thousands of Southerners that had gone North after the communist victory ("regroupees"). This clandestine organization initially focused on political organization and propaganda, and came under heavy pressure by the Diem regime. Diem was an implacable enemy of the Communists and his nationalist credentials were comparatively clean, but he had inherited a very fragile situation. From the beginning he faced the threat of military coups, thrusting criminal gangs, a weak bureaucracy and army, and fierce factional fighting within South Vietnam between not only political factions, but religious groups (Buddhists and Catholics) as well.

==== Successes and failures of Diem: main NLF opponent ====
Some of Diem's authoritarian methods and nepotism alienated a variety of groups in South Vietnamese society. Diem's "Denounce Communism" campaign for example, indiscriminately persecuted and alienated numerous civilians (including people who helped the anti-French resistance) who may or may not have had strong links or sympathies with Communism. Diem's coldness towards Buddhist sensibilities in some areas also aggravated an already shaky situation. Nevertheless, Diem's efforts caused substantial damage to the communist apparatus, as attested to by complaints of setbacks in the documents of his Communist opponents. Some historians argue that Diem was no more corrupt or incompetent than other Third World leaders facing the difficult task of governing a new nation born of conflict, and that he was dealt a very harsh opening hand- including a ruthless communist foe that attacked every initiative he started, opposition from the French and numerous internal enemies, and a number of assassination attempts- both by the communists and his own military. Diem's bravery and calm demeanor during these attempts to kill him often won the esteem of American supporters. In addition, some Buddhist opponents of Diem it is held, were not the innocent religious leaders often portrayed in the press but sometimes collaborated with or were manipulated by that opposition. Vigorous communist efforts to destroy his reforms did not only target him personally for murder but singled out government personnel such as hamlet chiefs and school teachers for death.

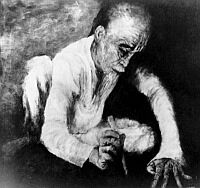
US caricature of Ho Chi Minh

While his administration was not immune from problems, Diem also appeared to have some success in social development during his tenure. His land reform measures for example, while not going to the extent urged by American advisers (such as more sharply limiting the number of hectares one farmer could own), in the words of one historian, "did succeed in breaking up the vast estates in the delta, and it changed the landless peasants in the South from the large majority to a minority. The Communists would later lament that this redistribution of land "seriously interfered" with their subsequent efforts to win over the peasantry through land reform." Ironically, Diem's American backers also failed to provide him with adequate funding to help buy land for redistribution to small peasants. Diem's other reforms emphasized agriculture rather than the forced-draft industrial development of the north, and the general restoration of order under his regime saw rising indicators of prosperity. Rice production for example which had fallen below pre-World War II production levels in 1954, surpassed the previous level by 1959. Production of rubber rose from 54,917 tons in 1954 to 75,374 in 1950, and cattle and pigs registered a threefold jump over the same period. Diem also placed limits on foreign capitalists and the amount of control they could exercise in various sectors. Per one study:

The agricultural boom, combined with the opening of hundreds of new primary and secondary schools and new hospitals staffed by American-trained nurses and physicians, raised South Vietnamese living standards at a pace that would have been impressive in any underdeveloped country, not to mention a country that was simultaneously bracing for a massive attack on its homeland.

==== Death of Diem and expansion of northern takeover campaign ====
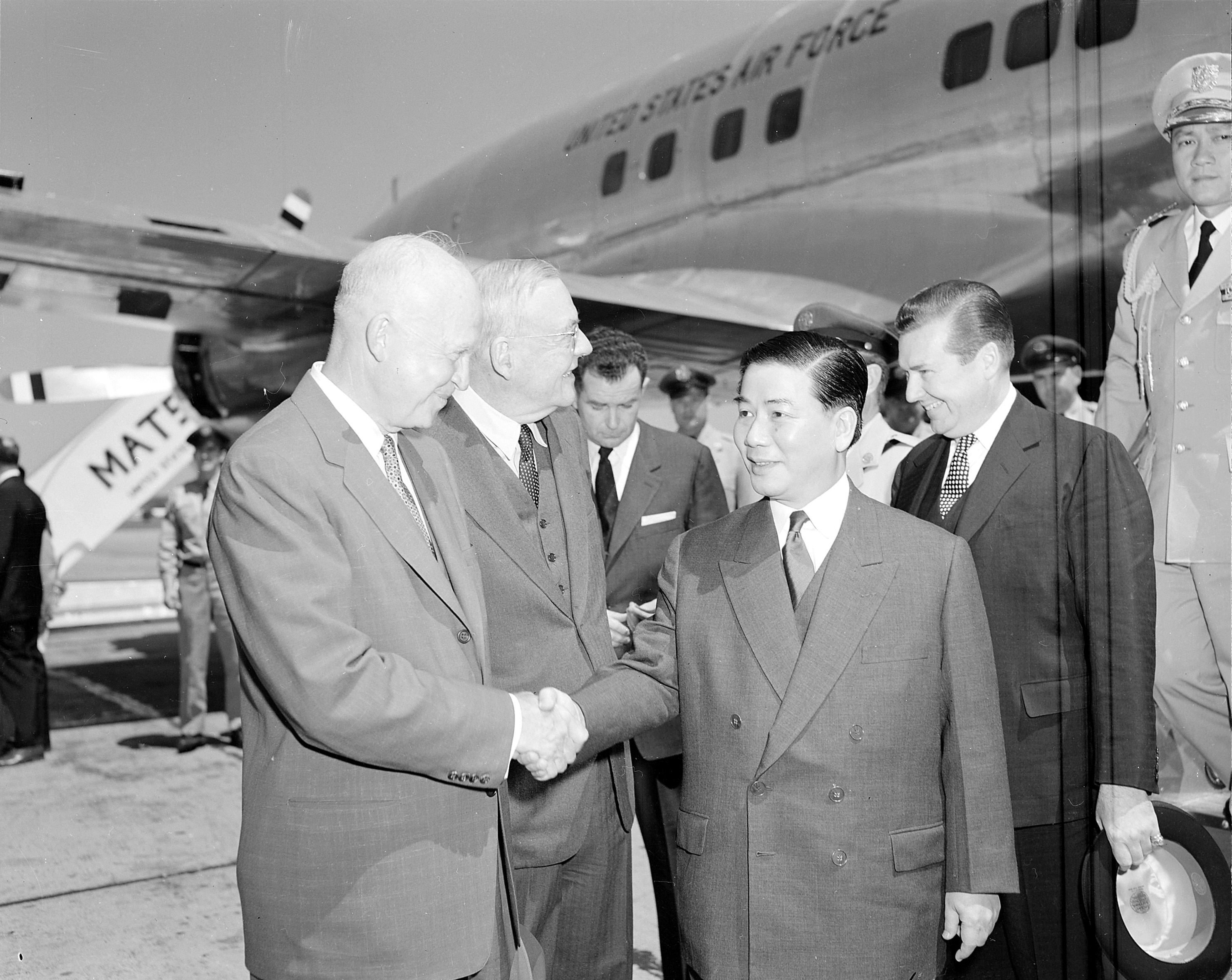
Ngô Đình Diệm

Diem also experienced several failures during his tenure. Harsh methods to suppress dissent, and abrasive personalities in his administration alienated a number of South Vietnamese, particularly Buddhists. His large scale resettlement of the peasantry, a key component of his rural strategy, floundered due to communist infiltration, poor planning and arbitrary implementation. While dependent on US aid, Diem was not afraid to disagree with or stand up to his American sponsors when he felt their demands were unworkable, incurring the enmity of the new US Ambassador Henry Lodge (1963–64) and certain US media figures that kept up a steady drumbeat of negative press, undermining his efforts. In an interview some months before his death, the South Vietnamese President again criticized what he claimed was American naivete at the difficult situation and American interference, including threats to cut US aid unless he kowtowed to opponents like the Buddhists. Said Diem:

Am I merely a puppet on Washington's string? Or – as I had hoped – are we partners in a common cause?.. If you order Vietnam around like a puppet on a string, how will you be different – except in degree – from the French?

Diem was assassinated with the connivance of his erstwhile American allies- with coup plotters maintaining "contact with Ambassador Lodge over a direct wire installed between their officers' club and the US Embassy.. Ambassador Lodge boasted privately to Kennedy that "the ground in which the coup seed grew into a robust plant was prepared by us.." Ho Chi Minh on hearing of Diem's assassination reportedly considered the US role foolish, as Diem was the most effective opponent to communist plans, and predicted subsequent years of instability for South Vietnam.

Diem's successful initial campaign provoked increasing assistance from the Communist North to the clandestine southern formations. As early as 1959, the Central Committee of the Party had issued a resolution to pursue armed struggle. Thousands of regroupees were re-infiltrated south, and a special unit was also set up, the 559th Transport Group, to establish way-stations, trails, and supply caches for the movement of fighting men and material into the zone of conflict. In 1960 the Central Committee formed the National Liberation Front (NLF). Its military wing was officially called the People's Liberation Armed Forces (PLAF) but became more popularly known as the Viet Cong (VC). The NLF/VC took in not just armed guerrillas but served as a broad front for a variety of groups opposed to Diem. While much propaganda was expended in presenting armed elements opposed to Diem as independent and spontaneous, all communist forces in the field - from village guerrillas, to Main Force Units and PAVN regulars were under a single command structure set up in 1958, and controlled by Hanoi.

=== Northern build-up of early southern insurgent forces ===
The North stiffened the early NLF effort in four ways:

1. Sending thousands of northern cadres into the south as leaders and trainers, sometimes aggravating a regional culture clash within revolutionary ranks.
2. Standardizing the polyglot VC inventory of fighting arms, including rifles (the AK-47) and machine guns using a common caliber round. Other excellent arms included the RPG-2 and various recoilless rifles.
3. Organization of VC units into larger formations, from battalions to regiments, to the first VC division, the famous 9th VC.
4. Deployment of PAVN regulars to build up logistical networks for later infiltration, (the 559th Transport Group) and insertion of complete regular units such as the 325th Division in remote border areas.

=== Early effectiveness of the Viet Cong ===
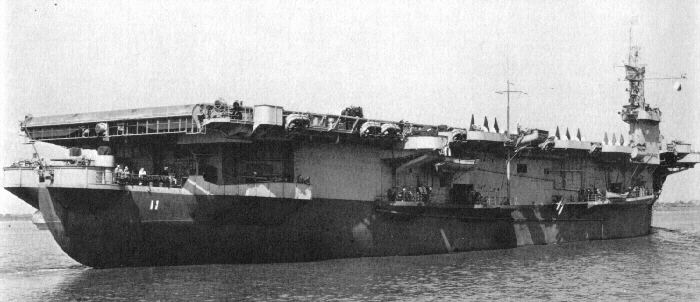
By 1964, the VC were attacking in regimental strength with growing success. A VC demolition team even damaged USS Card while pierside.

By 1964 the VC, supported by smaller numbers of PAVN, were increasingly effective, conducting attacks up to regimental strength. The Battle of Binh Gia (also known as The Battle of Ap Bac in many Western histories), where the victorious VC held the battlefield for 4 days rather than simply melt away as in earlier times is a vivid example of their confidence and effectiveness. Their operations regularly drubbed Diem's troops, and although Diem's forces controlled a number of urban areas and scattered garrisons, the security situation had become critical.

VC confidence also showed in a number of attacks against American installations and troops, from assaults against places where US soldiers and advisers gathered, to sinking of an American aviation transport ship, the USS Card at a Saigon berth in 1964. Viet Cong forces also struck hard at American air assets, destroying or damaging large numbers of US aircraft during daring raids at the Bien Hoa in 1964, and Pleiku in 1965. Viet Cong Main Force units were not the only communist forces on the offensive in the early 1960s. In areas near the North Vietnamese border, PAVN regulars joined in the assault against South Vietnam with strong conventional units, including divisions like the PAVN 304th and 325th, and inflicted severe losses on the ARVN. The communist strategy was to kill as many ARVN effectives as possible, paving the way for a collapse of the South Vietnamese regime before the Americans could arrive in force. In other areas, PAVN regulars operated in disguise as "local farmers" - adopting peasant garb like black pajamas and straw hats, and removing manufacturing marks from weapons made in Soviet Bloc countries and shipped to Vietnam. The PAVN also positioned numerous base camps near South Vietnam's borders from which they sallied out to strike at will. These border zone strike forces were soon to clash with the Americans in one of the war's fiercest battles- at a place called the Ia Drang Valley. Total NLF/PAVN fighting strength is controversially estimated by the American Military Assistance Command- Vietnam (MACV) at around 180,000 men in 1964. Opposing them during the war's early phases were (on paper by various estimates) over 300,000 ARVN troops and a US troop level that stood at around 16,000 in 1964, This was to increase rapidly in later years.

== Strategy ==
=== The Protracted War conflict model ===
Prosecution of the war followed the Maoist model, closely integrating political and military efforts into the concept of one struggle, or dau tranh. Dau Tranh was and remains the stated basis of PAVN operations, and was held to spring from the history of Vietnamese resistance and patriotism, the superiority of Marxism–Leninism and the Party, the overwhelming justice of Vietnam's cause, and the support of the world's communist and socialist forces. War was to be waged on all fronts: diplomatic, ideological, organizational, economic and military. Historian Douglas Pike notes that Dau Tranh was divided into military and political spheres:

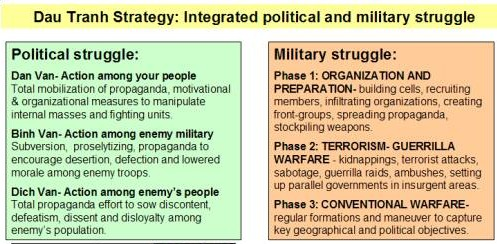

==== Political dau tranh: three elements ====
- Dan Van- Action among your people: Total mobilization of propaganda, motivational & organizational measures to manipulate internal masses and fighting units. Example: Intensive indoctrination and total mobilization of all civilian and military personnel in North Vietnam.
- Binh Van- Action among enemy military: Subversion, proselytizing, and propaganda to encourage desertion, defection and lowered morale among enemy troops. Example: contribution to large number of South Vietnamese Army deserters and draft evaders in early years.
- Dich Van- Action among enemy's people: Total propaganda effort to sow discontent, defeatism, dissent and disloyalty among enemy's population. Involves creation and/or manipulation of front groups and sympathizers. Example: work among South Vietnamese and US media, activist and academic circles.

==== Military dau tranh: the three phases ====
The strategy of the communist forces generally followed the protracted Revolutionary Warfare model of Mao in China, as diagrammed above. These phases were not static, and elements from one appear in others. Guerrilla warfare for example co-existed alongside conventional operations, and propaganda and terrorism would always be deployed throughout the conflict.

1. Preparation, organization and propaganda phase
2. Guerrilla warfare, terrorism phase
3. General offensive – conventional war phase including big unit and mobile warfare

As part of the final stage, emphasis was placed on the Khoi Nghia, or "General Uprising" of the masses, in conjunction with the liberation forces. This spontaneous uprising of the masses would sweep away the imperialists and their puppets who would already be sorely weakened by earlier guerrilla and mobile warfare. The Communist leadership thus had a clear vision, strategy and method to guide their operations.

==== Translation of Dau Tranh doctrine into military action ====
Militarily this strategy translated into a flexible mix of approaches on the ground:

- Continued efforts to build the revolutionary VC infrastructure and weaken GVN forces via propaganda and organization.
- Broad use of terrorism and low intensity guerrilla warfare
- Widening the field of conflict logistically by expanding bases and troop movement in Laos and Cambodia
- Small-unit mobile warfare using NLF Main Forces and PAVN regulars over the expanded space- especially during seasonal offensive thrusts
- Limited conventional operations where overwhelming numerical superiority could be concentrated to liquidate the maximum number of enemy effectives or control strategic blocks of territory
- A General Uprising by the aggrieved masses as the enemy weakened
- Full-scale offensives by conventional forces with secondary guerrilla support

Overall, this approach was generally successful. It did not occur in a vacuum however. It both shaped and reacted to events in the arena of struggle.

=== South Vietnamese counter-strategy ===
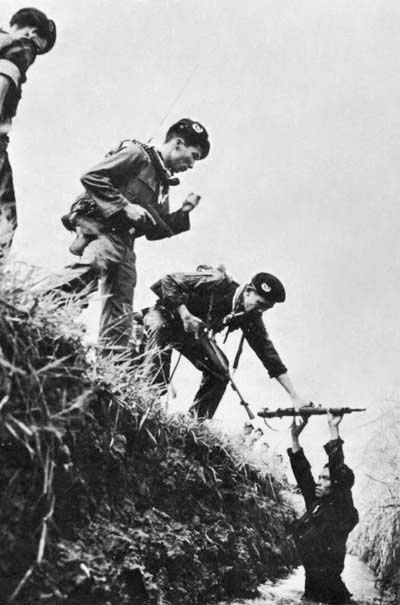
South Vietnamese forces capture a VC fighter c. 1964

Struggles of GVN forces under Communist pressure

While segments of the government of South Vietnam suffered severe problems in leadership, motivation and administration, it is clear that millions of ordinary South Vietnamese opposed insurgent and northern efforts to take over South Vietnam. These included some 900,000 refugees who voted with their feet to move South when Vietnam was partitioned in 1954. Faced with a well-organized, ruthless foe, South Vietnamese (GVN- Government of South Vietnam) counter-strategy was heavily dependent on American aid and personnel. Coordination between the two allies was poor, and both seemed to fight separate wars for much of the conflict.

Much emphasis was placed on pacification, and rhetorical claims of "revolutionary" rural development paralleled Communist propaganda. However needed reforms in cleaning up government corruption, land redistribution, attacking the VC infrastructure, and improving the ARVN armies were uneven, or poorly implemented, especially after the death of Diem. Unlike Communist forces, the GVN also failed to effectively mobilize a critical mass of its populace behind a nationalist or even an anti-communist narrative on a sustained, large scale basis, although several initiatives were started. The GVN's "Strategic Hamlet" program for example boasted much progress, but this was primarily on paper, and ineffective in halting VC infiltration, terror, and organizing efforts.

ARVN units were often moulded in the American image and style, but without the training or technical knowledge to execute effectively. This style involved heavy logistical tails, ponderous organizational structures, dependence on firepower, and frequent roving "sweep" tactics that shortchanged the vital conterinsurgency war for the population base.

Improvement of conventional warfare capabilities was also uneven, although elite ARVN units often performed well. A primary GVN weakness was motivation and morale of its general issue forces. ARVN desertion rates in 1966 for example had reached epidemic proportions, and draft dodging was also serious, with some 232,000 evaders failing to report for duty. In 1966, US General Westmoreland forbade the creation of any more ARVN units until the existing ones were brought up to some minimum level of strength. Leadership in the ARVN was a significant problem, with corruption or political considerations often taking precedence over defeating the communist threat. Understrength units for example, sometimes kept "phantom" soldiers on the roster, with leaders pocketing the extra payroll of the bogus troops. Some ARVN commanders sometimes refused to commit enough troops to an operation, or found ways to delay or sabotage execution, because orders from Saigon forced or encouraged them to keep troops on hand to guard against coups, or participate in some other internal political maneuver. The people least likely to see promotion were often the front-line battlefield commanders, continually passed over in favor of political cronies or those paying bribes. In 1968 for example less than 2 percent of all officers promoted to higher rank held their new positions based on battlefield competence. Relations with the civilian population in many areas remained hostile, playing into VC hands.

Improvements in ARVN performance

The Tet Offensive saw some steady ARVN performances and military defeat of the VC during Tet allowed the ARVN to consolidate its gains. The GVN made measurable progress in securing its population base—retaking areas once dominated by the VC and rooting out their clandestine infrastructure. While old problems like corruption, leadership and political interference continued to dog them, some historians argue that with continued US material aid, the improved South Vietnamese forces, might have contained and overcome a moderate guerrilla-level war. By 1972, the guerrilla threat had essentially been reduced to low-level proportions and the Southern regime's hand was strengthened. The war however had ceased being primarily a guerrilla conflict and had become conventional, with Hanoi openly bidding for victory during the 1972 Easter attack. ARVN troops simply could not cope in the long term without US assistance and firepower against a ruthless, well organized, and well supplied conventional Northern foe.

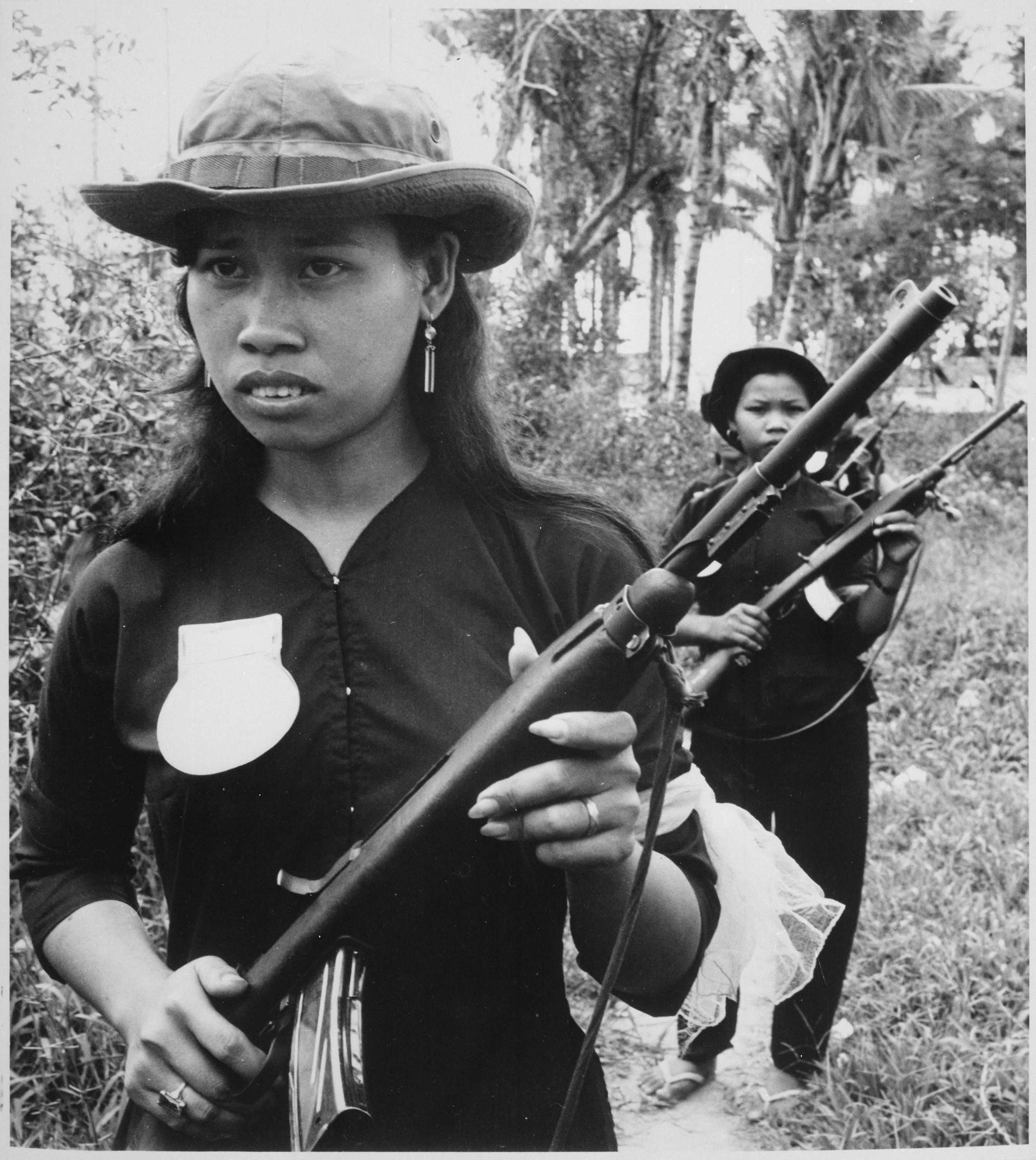
Often overlooked, and continually shortchanged in resources, South Vietnamese militia units suffered higher casualty rates than the regular ARVN yet accounted for up to 30% of NLF/PAVN combat deaths inflicted by ARVN forces.

With hundreds of thousands dead, and many localized examples of excellent combat performance, important segments of South Vietnamese society put up a strong fight against Northern hegemony. During the 1972 Easter Offensive for example, such resistance highlighted credible performances, not only by elite units like Rangers, Marines or Paratroops, but among elements of regular divisions as well. Strong leadership in the form of commanders like Maj. General Ngo Quang Truong also galvanized and inspired the ARVN effort at places like Hue and An Loc.

Credible performance of many local and regional militia forces

Of special note are the paramilitary units- the Popular Forces and Regional Forces (RF/PF – aka "Ruff-Puffs"). These militia troops were locally or regionally based, and continually shortchanged in terms of equipment, weaponry, pay, leadership, supplies and combat support like air, artillery or gunship strikes. Knowing their local areas in detail they had significant potential for local population security and represented a constant threat to communist troop movements and the Viet Cong Infrastructure (also known as the Revolutionary Infrastructure). As such they came under special attack, suffering a higher casualty rate than ARVN regulars. Overlooked by both the US Army and their ARVN leaders, they made a credible impact- using less than 20% of the ARVN military budget and just 2–5% of overall war expenditure, the despised militia men accounted for some 30 percent of NLF/PAVN combat deaths inflicted by the South Vietnamese combat effort, despite lacking the heavy weaponry and resources of the regular army. Serious efforts to arm and train them properly however came comparatively late in the conflict (after the Tet Offensive) and their efforts however were often sidetracked by the American and ARVN preference for big-unit sweeps. They were never really integrated into the total war effort.

Demise of ARVN

Old difficulties however continued into the "Vietnamization" era and are well illustrated in the 1971 Laotian Lam Son 719 incursion, and these were magnified by the 1972 Offensive. By 1973, the Nixon regime faced growing public dissatisfaction, and unremitting pressure by the US Congress, anti-war protesters and segments of the US media, to quickly exit Vietnam, despite promises made of continued aid. The American pull-out left over 150,000 PAVN troops in strong tactical positions inside South Vietnam. While aid from the Soviet bloc and China to the North continued unabated, American congressional action cut off the use of US military assets and sharply reduced promised aid to the South. By 1975, when the final conquest by the NVA/PAVN began, the South Vietnamese were on their own.

=== American counter-strategy ===
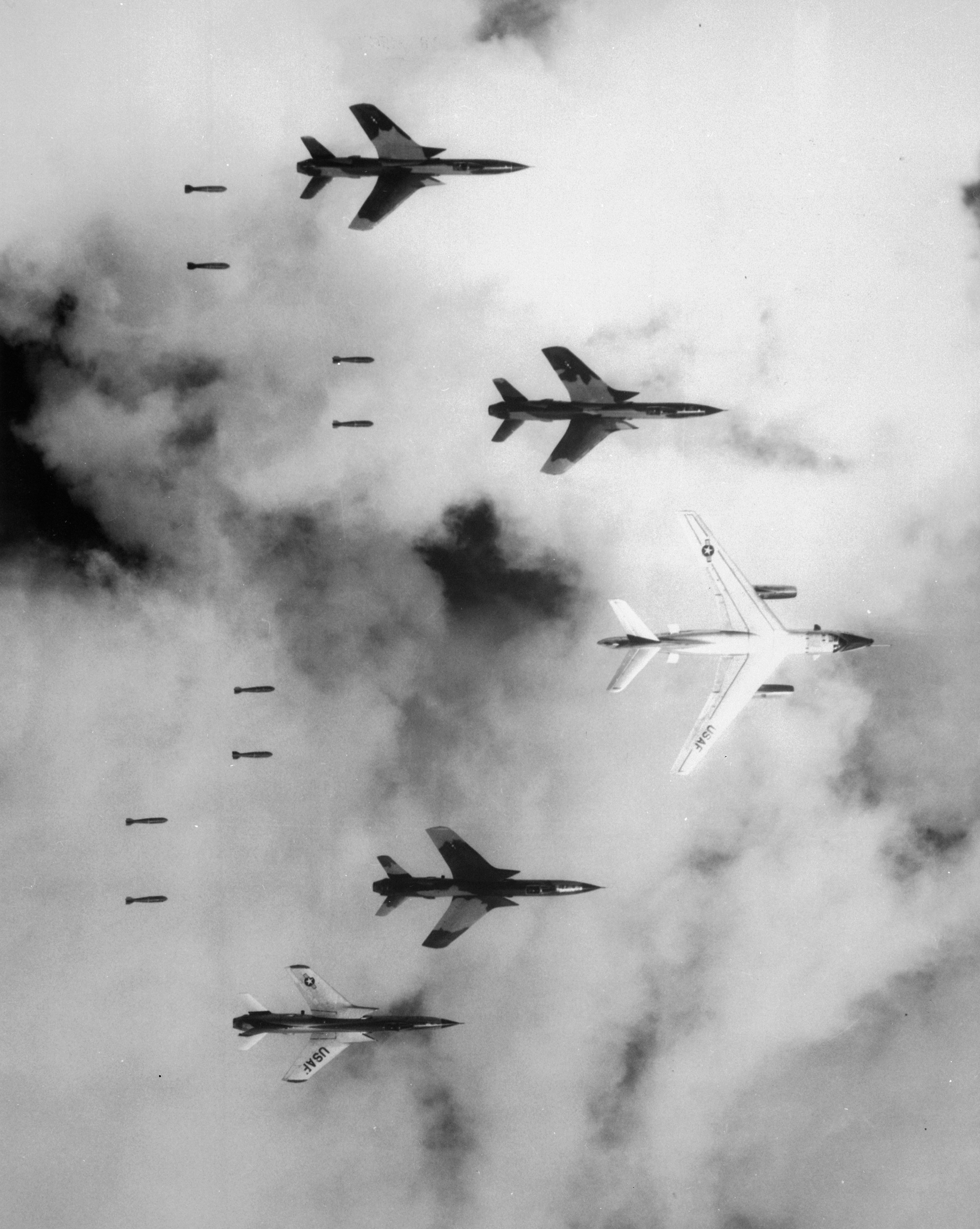
The gradualist US bombing campaign against the North in the early phases of the war had limited effect. Numerous targets were off-limits including some shipment points where war material was imported from the Soviet Union and China. Most of the US bomb tonnage dropped was on the territory of its ally, South Vietnam.

==== Debates over the gradualist approach and bolder plans ====
The US counter-strategy was ineffective in a number of ways against Communist forces. This ineffectiveness was predicted by Hanoi's analyses of weaknesses and contradictions in their enemy's camp (Vo Nguyen Giap, Big Victory, Great Task) An initial policy of gradualism against North Vietnam for example, saw the American President and his Secretary of Defence huddled over maps and charts, planning piecemeal airstrikes on limited targets. These inflicted some localized damage, but had little significant effect on the overall NLF/PAVN buildup in the south.

Fear of adverse Chinese, Soviet and public reaction also caused US policymakers to put numerous restrictions on American forces until comparatively late in the war. Plans drawn up by the military Joint Chief of Staff, US MACV commander General Westmoreland, and naval chief Admiral Sharp proposed bolder strategic action. This included airborne-amphibious landings north of the DMZ, corps-sized thrusts to liquidate enemy sanctuaries in the DMZ, Laos and Cambodia, a shutdown of incoming war material by mining the vital Haiphong harbor and more bombing of key targets in the Hanoi/Haiphong zone. All of these were rejected by civilian policymakers, with one or two implemented very late in the American War. By that time, the focus was on withdrawal of US forces. Some critics have argued that the Joint Chiefs in particular should have been more forceful in standing up to civilian leadership about their misgivings, but whether this would have made any difference is unknown. All of the more ambitious plans above had their own technical and political difficulties, some historians argue – including the threat of Chinese intervention, a repeat of the guerrilla warfare in the North as the Viet Minh did with the French, or other countermeasures by the North Vietnamese, who, in conjunction with allies such as the Pathet Lao, could have simply widened the war in Cambodia, Laos and even into Thailand as a reaction to American moves elsewhere.

Some writers contend that a defensive strategy would have made more sense for the US, conceding the sparsely populated Central Highlands and concentrating combat power in the more important and more populous coastal zones, at a cost of far fewer US troops, and less loss of public support. Others argue that a fundamental flaw in the American ground strategy was a focus on attrition rather than counterinsurgency to secure the population.

American war games conducted in 1964, (Sigma I and Sigma II) predicted that US airpower alone would not defeat Hanoi's will to fight because of the relatively small amount of supplies needed to keep communist operations in business. Sigma II concluded that the introduction of ground troops would fail to deliver victory and erode political support for the war at home. Both war games also held that cutting the Ho Chi Minh Trail would mean little without effective suppression of the VC, since the VC procured a substantial amount of their supplies, particularly food, inside South Vietnam.

==== Heavy footprint of US operations on South Vietnam ====
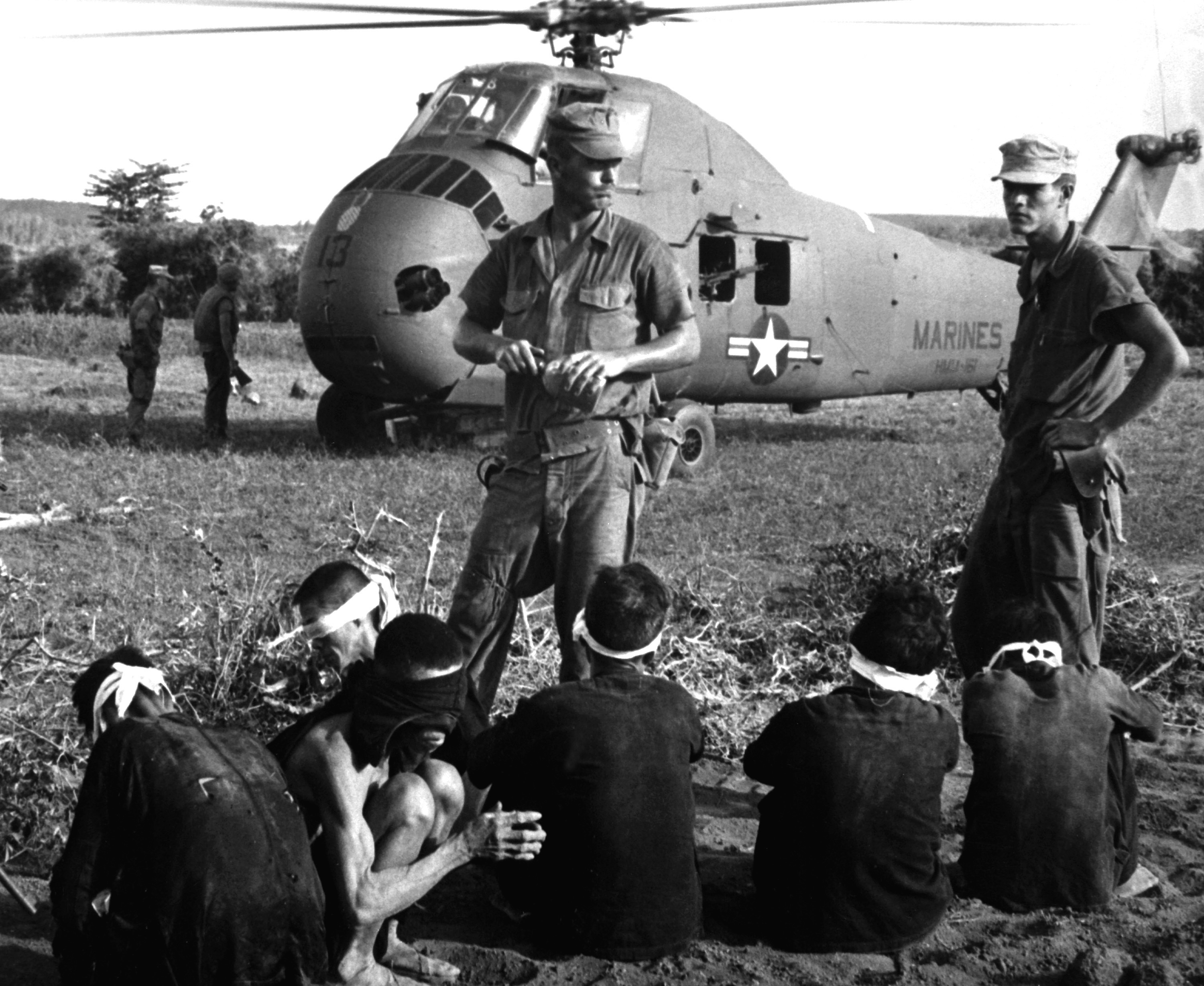
US Marines guard VC captives near Cu Chi 1965.

US forces relied heavily on firepower in their attempt to counter Communist advantages in local concentration, organization, knowledge of the terrain, and the element of surprise in where and when to strike. The NLF and PAVN had no qualms about provoking US attacks and deliberately using civilians as human shields, sometimes preventing them from leaving an area under attack. Such methods yielded both practical benefits and cynical propaganda opportunities. Some American tactics however caused collateral damage and extensive destruction to the countryside, including harassment and interdiction fires (H&I), deployment of heavy artillery and bombs in populated areas, defoliation and the creation of "free-fire" zones. Some historians also maintain that generation of refugees was a systematic US tactic, recommended a number of times in official US documents and implemented by military means. One State Department memo for example suggested that "Measures to encourage refugee flow might be targeted where they will hurt the VC most and embitter people toward the US/GVN forces least" and Undersecretary of State Nicholas Katzenbach "ordered the military to produce more refugees" in the Northern I Corps sector. According to one historian: "The actual generation of refugees involved three different destructive policies: intensive bombing and shelling, chemical destruction of crops and forests; and the physical removal of villages by ground troops."

This approach not only failed to consistently bring big enemy units to battle, but struggled to win the "hearts and minds" of the populace. By 1969, for example, some 20% of the country's population had been refugees at one time or another – an outcome caused by massive RVNAF and particularly US bombing and artillery. Widespread destruction among the civilian population is typical of many guerrilla conflicts—from the ancient Romans in Spain to the colonial wars of Africa—nevertheless such methods led many opponents of the US war to question both their legality and morality, and intensified political and diplomatic pressure against American involvement in the conflict.

Some US military sources also questioned their value. A Pentagon Systems Analysis study during the war for example concluded that H&I fires were ineffective and created a negative impression of indiscriminate force by US troops. There were also differences within the US command. Leaders such as Marine General V. Krulak favored a more restrained pacification-oriented approach, and his "Spreading Inkblot Theory" questioned the heavy 'search and destroy' philosophy of General W. Westmoreland as not only sometimes counter-productive, but neglectful of controlling key population bases, and developing more effective ARVN forces.

The heavy footprint of US operations can also be seen in its bombing campaign. More than twice the tonnage of bombs dropped during the entire World War II Pacific War was deposited on the South by the US. Over 7,000,000 tons of bombs were delivered in total by the Americans. Some 60% of this fell within the territory of its ally, South Vietnam. Another 1.5 million tons of bombs were unloaded on Laos and Cambodia. America's main enemy North Vietnam received approximately one million tons of bombs- between 10–15% of the total. The bombs left over 25 million craters on an area the size of New Mexico (121,666 square miles), and heavily damaged over half the forests of South Vietnam and 60% of its hamlets. Overall, approximately three times the amount of bombs dropped in World War II were dropped on Vietnam as a whole, making it the most bombed country in history. Along with bombs some 400,000 tons of napalm were dropped and some 19.1 million gallons of herbicides were applied. Most of this amount, like that of air-delivered bombs, also fell on the territory of South Vietnam.

==== Flawed use of US troops ====
Some Western historians of the Vietnam War assert that US troops were often used inefficiently. For example, the force structure came with a massive logistical burden, placing most of the manpower in support formations. The result was under-strength units up front, and huge wastage and theft of weapons, equipment and supplies in the rear. The US emphasis on "kill ratios" was logical in view of an attrition strategy, but such measures of success were often exaggerated and inflated. One study of captured enemy documents for example, alleged that actual enemy losses were 30 to 50 percent less than what MACV claimed in official reports. The attrition focus meant US troops could not stay to prevent the return of VC/PAVN troops but had to keep roving from area to area to flush out opponents. This constant movement generated problems of its own. Not only was the enemy elusive, but some American units developed "firebase psychosis" – a reluctance to move and fight too far away from the supporting fires of fixed bases.

Combat units also lacked cohesion, due to the reluctance of the Johnson administration to call up the reserves, and a rotation policy that did not secure the best trained personnel on a consistent, long-term basis for Vietnam. The result in many US units was an endless supply of less seasoned "green" draftees or short-training officers, "rotated" in the theater for one year. Such policies were a drag on overall stability and cohesion, and caused the loss of hard-won combat knowledge in-country. Troop rotation policies also hindered continuity in pacification. Adviser postings to the ARVN's regular or local forces for example, were not considered to be a desirable career tracks, and a one-year or six-month tour of duty left scant time to build the intimate knowledge of an area, its politics, and its people necessary to counter the clandestine Communist infrastructure. American advisers might just begin to see results on the ground when they were rotated out.

==== Pacification versus 'Search and Destroy' against the NLF/PAVN ====
Lively debate still surrounds the "search and destroy" attrition strategy of US General William Westmoreland in the early years of American involvement.

The pacification-first approach. Supporters of the "pacification-first" approach argue that more focus on uprooting the local Communist infrastructure, and cleaning up internal problems would have denied the enemy their key population base, reduced the destructiveness of US operations, strengthened the Southern regime, and yielded better overall results. Since 90% of the population resided on the coastal plain and in the Delta, massive sweeps into thinly populated areas like the Highlands, or remote border jungle, were deemed counterproductive. Resources were better spent securing key rice-producing villages under pressure by VC operatives, or training ARVN forces to be more effective. Such critics point to the success sometimes achieved by the US Marines in their I Corps zone of operations, and the US Special Forces in organizing large areas of tribal peoples before the 1965 intervention. Both these alternative approaches however were marginalized or sidetracked by the main-unit war.

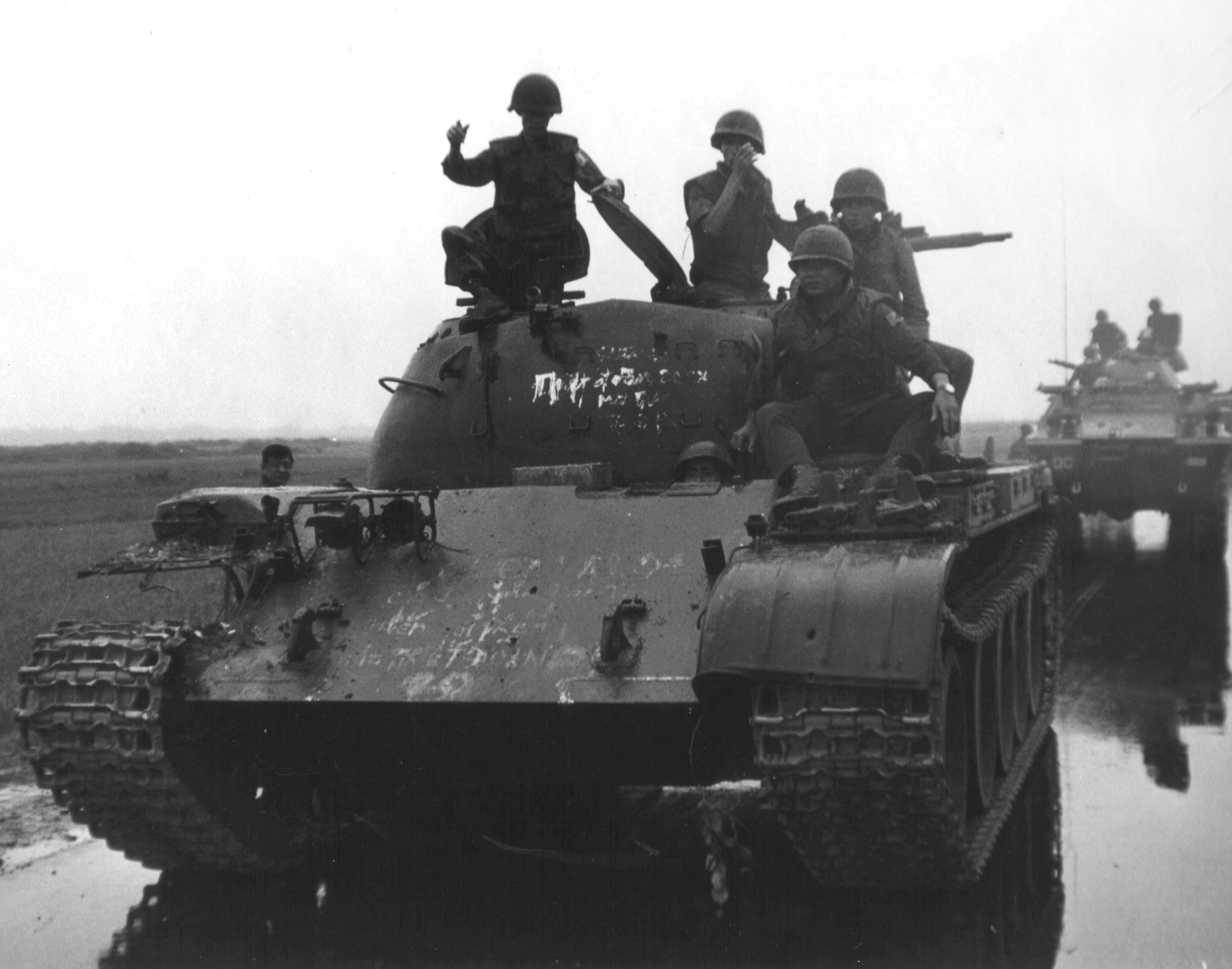
PAVN T59 Tank captured by South Vietnamese 20th Tank Regiment, south of Dong Ha.

The search and destroy approach. Defenders of "search and destroy" maintain that the Communist shift to Phase 3 warfare required "big battalion" activity to remove the most pressing conventional threats to the Saigon regime. They maintain that since Westmoreland was forbidden from striking with ground forces at Communist concentrations and supply routes in the three countries surrounding the battle zone (Laos, Cambodia and North Vietnam), his attritional strategy within the confines of South Vietnam was the only realistic option against an enemy that had the weak Saigon government on the ropes by 1964. Other analysts however, such as Andrew F. Krepinevich Jr., (The Army and Vietnam), maintain that there were equal or better alternatives available at the time besides large-scale attrition operations. In between are any number of variants on these themes.

Uneven progress of US pacification effort. The American pacification effort was also ineffective over several critical years, hampered by bureaucratic rivalries between competing agencies, a focus on big-unit operations, and lack of coordination between South Vietnamese civil agencies concerned with pacification, and the US military. The success of pacification efforts were closely linked to security and security and ARVN performance improved in the Creighton Abrams era after 1968's Tet battles. Some resources were shifted away from attrition towards counterinsurgency/pacification, and progress was made on the population base issue. However these reforms were haltingly implemented, and US forces largely continued to operate in the same way – seeking body counts and other attritional indicators, against an enemy that could always up the ante indefinitely by introducing more troops.

Phases of the war and the conflicting US approaches. Some writers have attempted to reconcile the different schools of thought by linking activity to a particular phase of the conflict. Thus Phase 2 guerrilla assaults might well be met by a pacification focus, while Phase 3 conventional attacks required major counter-force, not police squad or small-patrol activity. The early 1965 stabilization battles such as the Ia Drang, the 1967 border battles, and the 1968 Tet Offensive, are examples of the efficacy of big-unit warfare. Nevertheless, weaknesses were manifest in both areas. Some writers have questioned whether either pacification or "search and destroy" would have made any difference given dwindling American resolve, the big unit focus, other American and South Vietnamese weaknesses noted above, and the Communist strategy of attritional, protracted war.

=== Strategy disputes and shifts in the Communist high command ===
==== "Southern-firsters" versus "Northern-firsters" ====
Southerners were prominent among Hanoi's war directors, and included such men as Le Duan, who argued forcefully for more confrontation and the massive introduction of northern men and material into the conflict. The role of southerners was to diminish as the war ended, not only in the northern politburo but against VC remnants in the south as well.

The strategy to govern the war was often a matter of debate within Hanoi's upper echelons. The "northern-firsters" led by Vo Nguyen Giap and Truong Chinh, argued for a more conservative, protracted approach, which allowed the North to consolidate socialism and build its armed forces while the southern revolutionaries assumed primary responsibility for their liberation. Prominent "southern-firsters" led by Le Duan and Nguyen Chi Thanh maintained that the Diem regime was tottering on the ropes and quick victory could be assured by an aggressive push that required Main Force confrontations with both the South Vietnamese and the Americans. Debate still continues among some Western historians as to the exact line-up of Politburo personalities and issues, particularly that of Giap.

==== Phases of Northern strategy ====
Historian Douglas Pike asserts that there were 5 phases of Northern strategy.

Early 1958-late 1960: Revolutionary War Preparation

1961-late 1964: Revolutionary Guerrilla War

Early 1965-mid-1968: Regular Force Strategy

Late 1968-Easter 1972: Neo-Revolutionary Guerrilla War

Summer 1972-end of war: High-Technology Regular Force Strategy

1. 1958– late 1960: Preparation for war including organizing, training and sending of thousands of regroupees back to the south, and formation of the 559th Transport Group to develop the Ho Chi Minh Trail
2. 1962–64: South Vietnam was on the ropes under a Revolutionary Guerrilla War approach combining strong organization building, terrorism and guerrilla strikes.
3. 1965–68: The introduction of American airpower and troops presented a massive challenge that directors of the communist effort attempted to meet with a Regular Force Strategy. This includes the brutal border battles of 1967, and the Tet Offensive in 1968. Both approaches saw massive losses to US firepower, and decimated VC units were increasingly filled and dominated by northern soldiers.
4. Late 1968– Easter 72: After Tet, the North relied particularly on sapper attacks by small units of well trained commandos on US and ARVN bases and installations. Minor guerrilla action remained in the picture, as did stand-off attacks by fire (mortars, rockets etc.).
5. 1972–1975: Conventional warfare period using the full panoply of modern weapons. The 1972 Offensive was crushed by a combination of US Airpower and steadfast ARVN fighting, but Hanoi rebuilt after the American pullout to achieve a quick conventional victory in 1975.

==== Tet Offensive ====
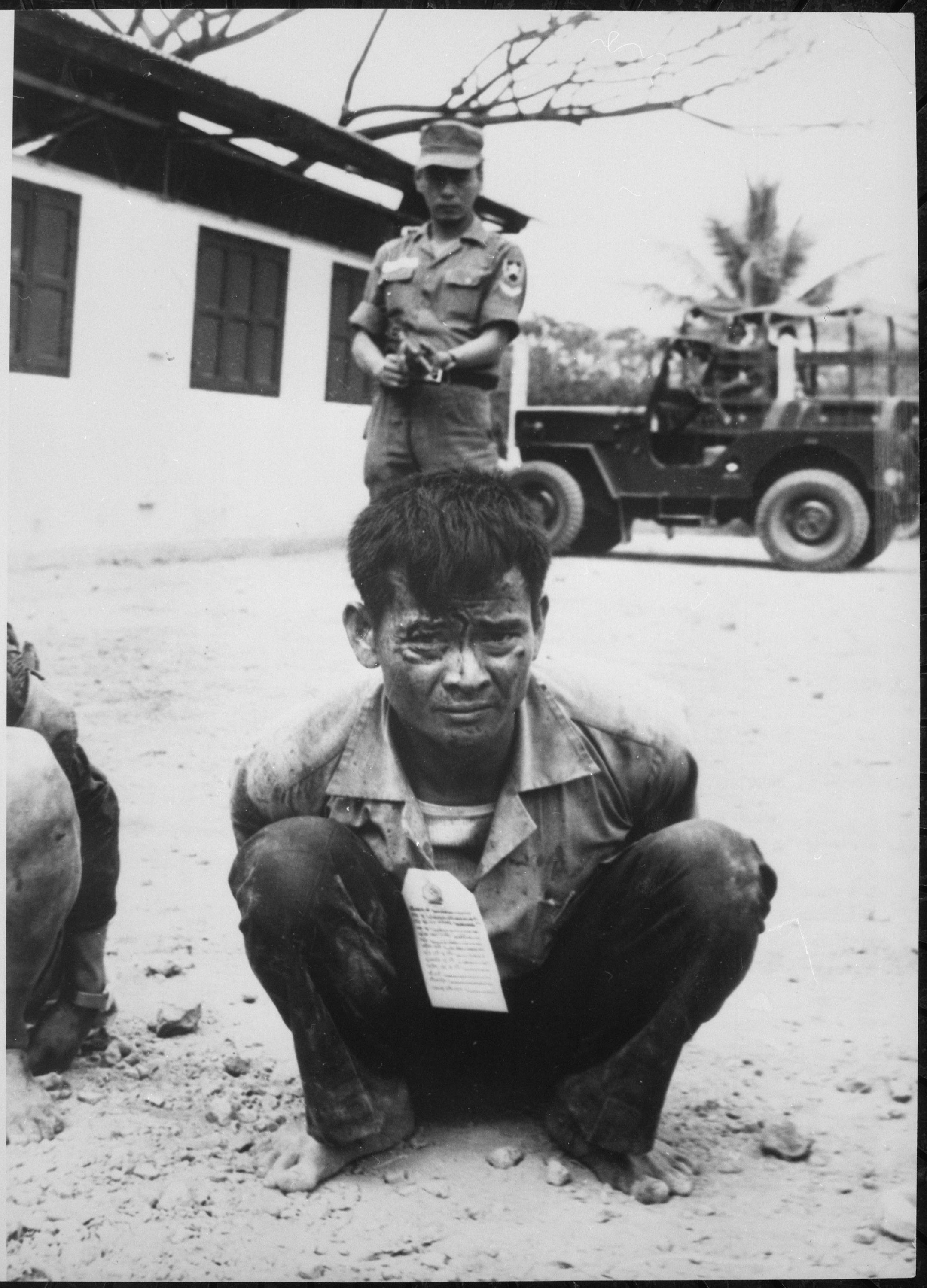
Captured Main Force Viet Cong during Tet

===== Tet as a VC defeat =====
As the border battles of 1967 wound down, Hanoi's war directors prepared for a savage blow- the Tong Cong kich, Tong Khoi Nghia or "General Uprising" among the Southern masses, known more popularly to Westerners as the Tet Offensive. The major phase of the Tet Offensive would consist of three parts: (a) a series of border assaults and battles to draw US forces out to the margins of South Vietnam, (b) attacks within South Vietnam's cities by VC forces These infiltrating attacks would bring about a rallying of the masses to the communist cause, and wholesale crumbling and defection of the ARVN forces and Saigon government under the combined pressure of military defeat and propaganda, and (c) large scale set-piece battles to drive the demoralized US imperialists back into coastal enclaves as their South Vietnamese allies wilted. Follow-on attacks in later months would attempt to improve tactical or negotiating positions after the main assault, which was set to begin in January 1968 and end with Phase 3, some 9 months later.

Tet was a definite change in strategy for the VC which largely had fought smaller-scale mobile and guerrilla warfare since the US arrival. During Tet they would stand and slug it out against the ARVN and Americans while enjoying the assistance of the aroused masses. The result was a military disaster, not only decimating the VC as an effective fighting force, but exposing much of their clandestine infrastructure. The Khe Sanh battle, while it did succeed in drawing a portion of American strength, was not sufficient to prevent or divert a strong US/ARVN response in the cities against the assaulting VC. The severe losses are noted even in official Communist sources.

It is significant that the main target of Tet was the GVN, the party tasked with pacification, the weak link in the defense of South Vietnam. Contrary to NLF dogma and expectations, the hoped for uprising of the masses never occurred. The South Vietnamese did not embrace the cause, and many ARVN units stood firm and fought back. Nevertheless, Tet demonstrates how Communist strategy was focused on the key element in a People's War- the population – whether to control it or demoralize it, while American strategy focused on kill ratios and attrition.

===== Tet as a strategic VC political and psychological victory =====
Little documentation from the Communist side shows influencing American public opinion as a primary or even secondary objective of the Tet Offensive. According to North Vietnamese General Tran Do in the aftermath:

In all honesty, we didn't achieve our main objective, which was to spur uprisings throughout the south. Still, we inflicted heavy casualties on the Americans and their puppets, and this was a big gain for us. As for making an impact in the United States, it had not been our intention – but it turned out to be a fortunate result.

Attacks on U.S. forces or influencing US elections were not of major importance during Tet. The main thrust was to destroy the GVN regime through demoralizing its armed forces and sparking the hoped for "General Uprising."

Some writers such as Stanley Karnow question whether there was an immediate American perception of Tet as a defeat however, given the drop in public support for the war prior to Tet, and polls taken during the initial Tet fighting showing a majority of the US public wanted stronger action against Communist forces. Nevertheless, according to Karnow, the Tet fighting seems to have shaken the determination of American political leaders, like US President L. Johnson.

Other writers such as US General Westmoreland, and journalist Peter Braestrup argue that negative press reports contributed to an attitude of defeatism and despair at the very moment American troops were winning against the VC. As such they claim, Tet was a major strategic political and psychological triumph for Communist forces in the conflict.

Whatever the merits of these debates or claims, it is clear that the Communist strategy of attritional conflict engendered an increasing war-weariness among their American opponents, whether the pressure was applied over time or more acutely during Tet, or whether guerrilla or conventional warfare was prominent at a particular time. After 1968, the US increasingly sought to withdraw from the conflict, and the future freedom of action by US leaders such as Richard Nixon was hindered by domestic anti-war opposition.

Tet not only exposed political weakness, but failures in America's military strategy as well – securing neither attrition or pacification after 3 years of war – an outcome predicted and achieved by the protracted strategy of the VC/PAVN. In the words of one US Department of Defence assessment called "Alternate Strategies" in March 1968, after the first phase or Tet:

We know that despite a massive influx of 500,000 US troops, 1.2 million tons of bombs a year, 400,000 attack sorties per year, 200,000 enemy KIA in three years, 20,000 US KIA, etc., our control of the countryside and the defence of the urban areas is now essentially at pre-August 1965 levels. We have achieved a stalemate at a high commitment.

==== The "other war:" the population base, tempo and strategy ====
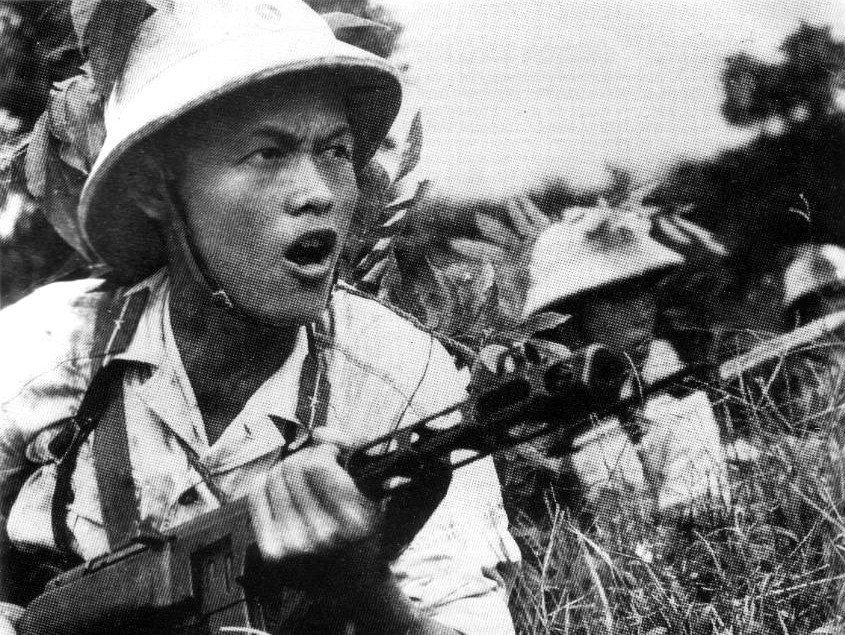
People's War strategy drew the Americans into remote areas, facilitating control of the real prize- the population base.

===== Drawing US forces to the periphery while shifting between phases =====
The flexible shifting of NLF/PAVN forces was sufficient against both their most potent enemy- the United States, and the GVN. Prior to 1965, the GVN faced near defeat with a mix of guerrilla and regular warfare. The introduction of the US saw a similar mix. Prior to 1972, VC and PAVN forces on the balance, refused to play the American game of big-unit confrontation. Instead, they shifted down to Phase 2 guerrilla and small unit mobile warfare to bleed their opponents, interspersed with occasional large-scale attacks when conditions and numbers were favorable. This strategy drew the Americans away from the key population concentrations on the coast and in the Delta, and into remote or sparsely populated areas, close to border sanctuaries in North Vietnam, Laos and Cambodia where resupply and escape was facilitated. It also widened the battlespace across a broad area, enhancing maneuvering room and survivability.

Even the costly urban center attacks of the Tet Offensive aided this pattern by (a) undermining pacification efforts as GVN troops from rural areas were diverted to defend the cities, and (b) luring significant US forces out to the periphery where they could be bled. This was so most notably at Khe Sanh, which drew 5% of MACV's operational strength, and tied down 15–20% of MACV's maneuver battalions- kept in reserve for relief of the base. Some American policymakers recognized this "peripheral draw" method but could do little significant about it. In the words of Henry Kissinger who helped negotiate the final US exit from Vietnam:

We fought a military war; our opponents fought a political one. We sought physical attrition; our opponent aimed for psychological exhaustion.. The North Vietnamese used their main forces the way a bullfighter uses his cape- to keep us lunging into areas of marginal political importance.

===== Successful control of the population =====
Failure to secure the population meant that the VC were able to tighten their grip- drawing a continual supply of recruits, food, intelligence, shelter and other resources to maintain their insurgency. The American concept of leaving the relatively ineffective ARVN to cope with this key other war, a task they had often failed at in several years prior to US intervention, played into the NLF's hands. In many cases where the population was separated from the insurgents via forced relocations, destruction of villages or generation of refugees, conditions still remained insecure, undermining GVN/US attempts at both pacification and attrition. Impressive as they seemed, big American or GVN sweeps inevitably moved on, failing to 'hold' an area and its population. Once their opponents had gone, the NLF and PAVN were able to return and resume business. This pattern is reflected even in the aftermath of the Tet attacks. They hurt the Viet Cong badly in military terms, and northern-born personnel were to increasingly dominate the Main-Force VC formations. However the critical population control and infrastructure effort continued, and the VC were still able to muster about 85,000 fresh recruits annually.

===== Mastery of the war's tempo =====
The VC/PAVN strategy also involved controlling the initiative of the struggle, when and where they would fight, and thus how many casualties they would take at various times and places. Initiative also meant controlling the size and composition of forces introduced to the battlefield, and thus the quantities of supplies needed. Material requirements were comparatively light, and much was procured inside South Vietnam itself. Additional PAVN troops could be introduced at will, more than matching American or GVN increases. The initiative factor, made the American attrition approach, and its elusive search for a "crossover" point (where communist losses would be more than available replacements) unworkable. Massive US troop sweeps and interdiction efforts while causing substantial pain to communist forces at different times and places, foundered on these realities.

The flexible shifting of tempo and styles however was not without cost. Tens of thousands of VC and PAVN regulars were required and on several occasions when attempts were made at confrontation in remote areas, such as at the Ia Drang in 1965 and in the 1967 border battles, heavy losses were suffered from US firepower.

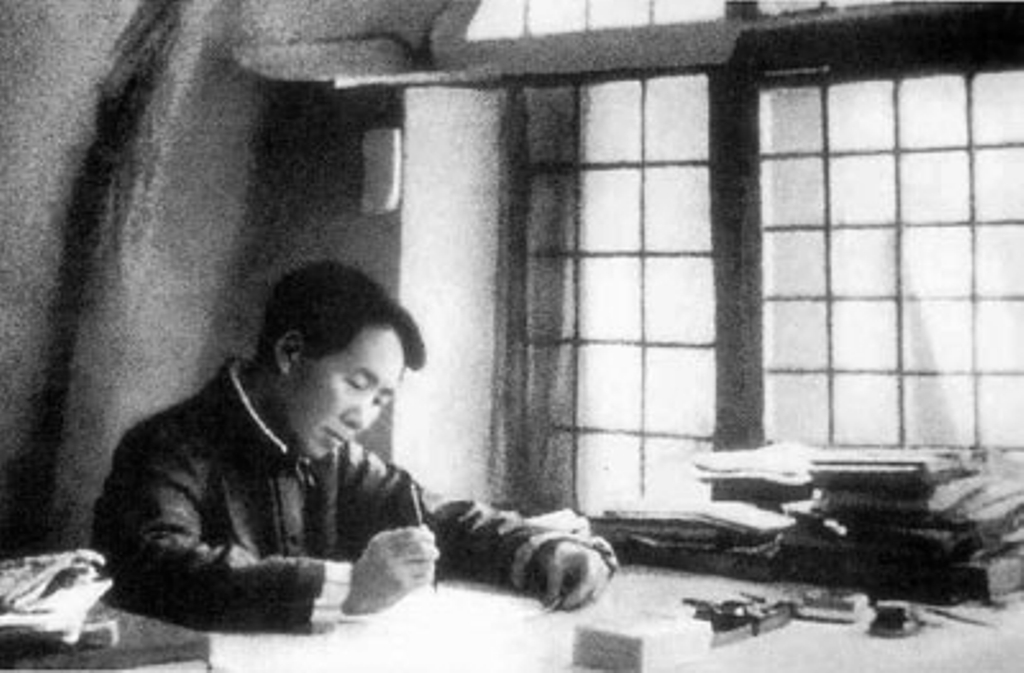
Mao Zedong's Protracted War model was modified by Hanoi's war directors, to incorporate more flexible shifting and the notion of a "General Uprising."

==== Effectiveness of overall Northern strategy ====
While numerous other aspects of the Tet Offensive and the complex strategies of the Vietnam War exist, Hanoi's ability to divide the strength of their opponents and maintain its grip on the population was a key part of its protracted war strategy. By 1972, the war was increasingly conventionalized, and population control became less critical as PAVN regulars took over most of the fighting. This final phase- victory by conventional forces was also part and parcel of the "people's war" approach.

A 1968 review of American strategy under US Commander C. Abrams, by the MACV "Long Range Planning Group" testifies to the efficacy of the PAVN/NLF strategy:

All of our US combat accomplishments have made no significant, positive difference to the rural Vietnamese—for there is still no real security in the countryside. Our large-scale operations have attempted to enable the development of a protective shield, by driving the PAVN and the NLF main force units out of South Vietnam—or at least into the remote mountain and jungle areas where they would not pose a threat to the population. In pressing this objective, however, we have tended to lose sight of why we were driving the enemy back and destroying his combat capability. Destruction of PAVN and NLF units and individuals—that is, the "kill VC" syndrome—has become an end in itself—an end that at times has become self-defeating. To accomplish the most difficult task of the war—and, really the functional reason for the US to be here—that of providing security to the Vietnamese people—we have relied on the numerous, but only marginally effective, ill-equipped and indifferently led Vietnamese paramilitary and police units. The Viet Cong thrive in an environment of insecurity. It is essential for them to demonstrate that the GVN is not capable of providing security to its citizens. And, they have succeeded..

== Recruitment and training ==
=== PAVN ===
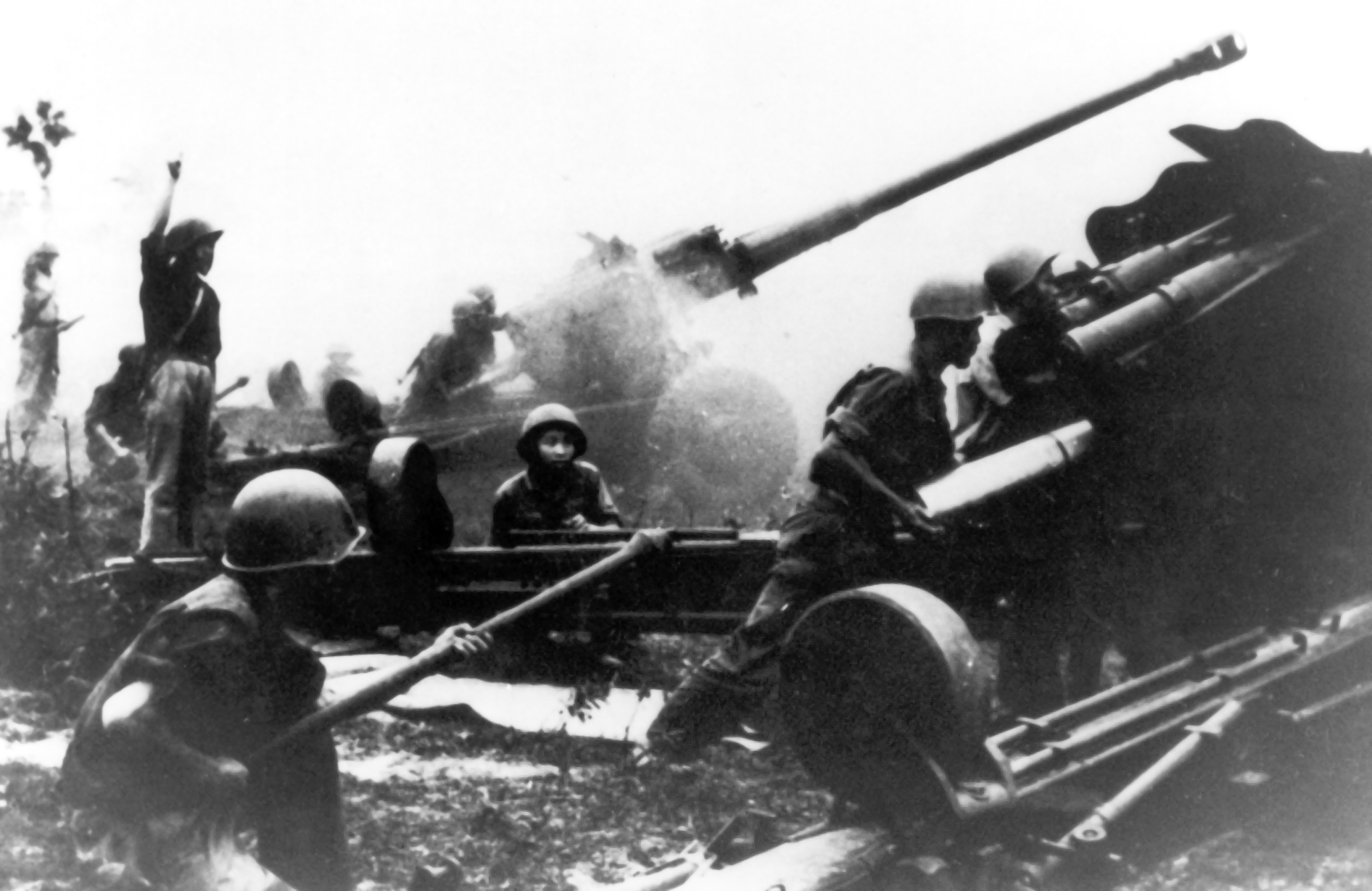
PAVN gunners manning a D-74 122 mm field gun, 1972

Initial recruitment and training. Based on a wide variety of accounts, the performance of some PAVN units was excellent, and at times they garnered a grudging respect among those they fought for their discipline, morale and skill. Recruitment was primarily based on the military draft of North Vietnam, and most PAVN soldiers served for the duration of the conflict. There were no "rotations" back to the homeland. The typical recruit was a rural youth in his early 20s, with three years of prior compulsory training and indoctrination in various militia and construction units. Draftees were mustered at indoctrination centers like Xuan Mia, southwest of Hanoi some months before their actual movement south.

A typical training cycle took 90 to 120 days for the recruit, with instruction on conventional military skills and procedure. Special emphasis was placed on physical conditioning. Heavy political indoctrination was part of the package throughout the cycle, most acutely during a special two-week "study" phase. Organization into three-man cells and kiem thao "criticism and self-criticism" sessions were part of the tight training regimen.

Men selected for infiltration to the South received more intense training – with more political indoctrination, weapons handling, and special emphasis on physical conditioning, particularly marching with heavy packs. Specialized training (heavy weapons, signals, medical, explosives) was given to selected individuals in courses that might last up to a year. Pay and rations for designated infiltrators was more than that given to other troops.

Assessment of the NVA/PAVN fighter. Compared to their NLF counterparts most PAVN had a higher standard of literacy. While his preparation was not especially impressive by Western standards, the typical PAVN soldier proved more than adequate for the task at hand. PAVN training was surprisingly conventional, with little special emphasis on jungle warfare. Most of the troops' learning occurred on the job. Service and indoctrination under the communist system prior to army recruitment made the typical PAVN fighter a bit older and more seasoned than his American or ARVN opponent. Throughout the conflict, PAVN defections and surrenders were extremely low, especially compared to that of the VC, a testimony to their motivation and organization.

=== VC ===
As in any guerrilla warfare, control of the populace is the key to the guerrilla's prosperity and survival. To this end, Communist forces made use of political influence and propaganda campaigns.

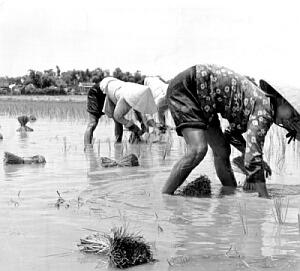
The villages: battleground for hearts and minds

Importance of the party cadres. Recruitment of VC fighters followed patterns similar to those in Mao's Revolutionary China. Party operatives dominated or influenced most significant activities, and so the initial agents of recruitment were the party cadres, tightly organized into small cells. The cadre, or team of cadres, typically were southern regroupees returning to help the insurgency. Since such persons would have some knowledge of the local area, theirs would not be a "cold call". They would enter a village, and make a careful study of its social, political and economic structure. Cadres usually downplayed communism, stressing local grievances and resentments, and national independence. All was not serious discussion. Musical groups, theater troupes and other forms of entertainment were frequently employed. The personal behavior of cadres was also vital. They were expected to lead austere, dedicated lives, beyond reproach. This would enable villagers to contrast their relatively restrained, non-pecuniary way of life, with the corruption of government representatives or targeted enemies. Female cadres sometimes made effective recruiters, being able to shame and goad young males into committing for the Revolution.

Use of local grievances and individuals. Local grievances and resentments were carefully catalogued by cadres, and detailed information was harvested on each potential supporter or recruit for later use. The cadres would then hit their targets with a variety of methods – friendship, casual political discussions, membership in some community organization, sponsorship of some village festival or event, or activism related to some local grievance or issue. As targets were softened up, the pressure increased. A small nucleus of followers was usually gathered, and these were used to further expand recruitment. The cadres exploited the incompetence, corruption or heavy-handedness of local government officials to stoke the fires. They also seized on perceived injustices by private parties – such as landlords. One vital part of the political effort was to encourage ARVN desertion, draft evasion, lowered morale, and if possible active or tacit support of the Front (NLF/VC). Friends and relatives of soldiers could make effective persuasive appeals while VC operatives who directed the prostelyzing remained hidden in the background.

Creation and manipulation of front groups or infiltration of existing organizations. While the Communist presence in the "united Front" against the US/GVN was no secret, VC operatives took pains to screen the full extent of their influence, and stressed patriotism, anti-foreign sentiment, local grievances and other issues that could mobilize support. Integral to this process was the creation of "front" groups to mask the true VC agenda. Such groups lent an aura of populist spontaneity and voluntarism while the VC worked them behind the scenes. Such entities could be seemingly innocuous farming cooperatives, or cultural groups, or anything in between. Party members either manipulated these new groups behind the scenes or infiltrated existing ones and gradually took over or influenced them towards the VC line. The goal was to enmesh as many people as possible in some group which could then be manipulated. Thus for example a traditional, apolitical rice harvest festival would be eventually twisted into mobilizing demonstrations against a government official or policy. Members of a farming cooperative might be persuaded into signing a petition against construction of an airfield. Whatever the exact front, issue, or cover used, the goal was control and manipulation of the target population.

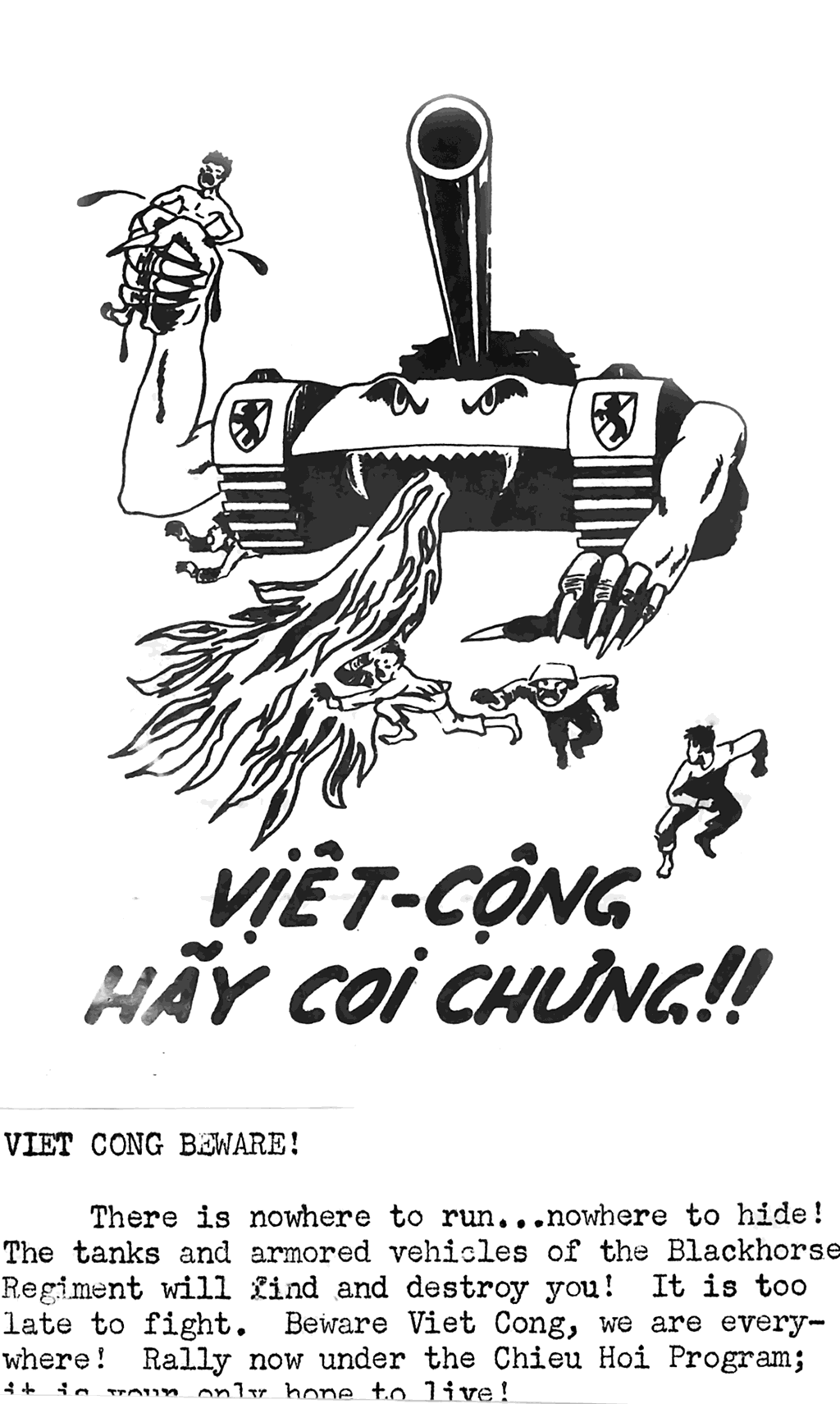
South Vietnamese propaganda poster urging Viet Cong fighters to surrender

The "parallel government" – strengthening the VC grip on the masses. As their web expanded, VC methods became more bold. Hit squads attacked and eliminated selected enemies. Ironically, officials who were too efficient or honest might also be liquidated since their conduct might mitigate the grievances and resentments the cadres sought to stoke. Farmers who owned "too much" land might also be fingered. Government facilities, or the private property of those on the target list might also be damaged and sabotaged. Such terror attacks not only eliminated rivals, they served as salutary examples to the villagers as to what could potentially befall them if they opposed the Revolution.

If fully successful, the once sleepy village might be turned into a functioning VC support base. In the early stages of the Vietnam War, American officials "discovered that several thousand supposedly government-controlled 'fortified hamlets' were in fact controlled by Viet Cong guerrillas, who 'often used them for supply and rest havens'." The VC intent was to set up a "parallel" administration, operating clandestinely. Such "revolutionary government" would set and collect taxes, draft soldiers to fight, impress laborers for construction tasks, administer justice, redistribute land, and coordinate local community events and civic improvements. All this activity had one aim – to further the VC/NLF cause, and tighten the Party's grip over the masses.

Intimidation. While a wide variety of front groups and propaganda campaigns were deployed and manipulated by VC political operatives, the VC also tapped effectively into local grievances and nationalist sentiment to attain a measure of genuine popular support in some areas. Parallel with this however, was an unmistakable track of coercion and intimidation. Villagers in a "liberated area" had little choice but to shelter, feed and finance the Revolutionary Forces, and were forced to expand the "liberated zone" by supplying manpower for constructing and maintaining supply dumps, fortifications, tunnels, and manufacturing facilities.

VC "Armed Propaganda" squads conducted a systematic campaign of assassination and kidnapping to eliminate competitors, intimidate the populace and disrupt or destroy normal social, political and economic life. These two tracks: popular support, and coercion/intimidation, were to run on together for a good part of the War.

Training of Main Force fighters. Recruits falling into the net were usually taken from the village to another location for political indoctrination and training, sometimes contradicting VC assurances that they would be able to serve near their home areas. Those showing promise were assigned to the Main Force Battalions, which were permanently organized military formations. Other recruits were expected to serve as part-time village helpers or guerrillas. Military training, like that of the PAVN was essentially conventional – marching, small unit tactics, basic weapons handling, etc. Illiteracy and lack of education was often a problem in VC ranks, and steps were made to correct this, with focus on the political task at hand. Specialized and advanced training, as in the PAVN was given to smaller groups of men. Political indoctrination continued throughout the VC Main Force fighter's training, with nightly "criticism and self-criticism" sessions to eliminate error, and purge incorrect thought.

Assessment of the VC fighter. The quality of VC training and recruitment was more uneven than that of the PAVN, and varied based on the war situation. Literacy was lower and defections were several times that of their Northern counterparts. In the context of the protracted insurgency however, and the communist willingness to expend lives, the VC fighting man was more than adequate to fulfill the goals determined by Communist leadership. In terms of their organization, one American Vietnam War historian calls the Viet Cong "more disciplined and organized than nearly any insurgents in history."

== Organization ==
=== Dominant role of Northern based Lao Dong (communist) party ===
The elaborate Communist command structure was supervised by multiple directorates and divided South Vietnam into operational zones.

Given the Communist Party's dominance over all spheres of Northern Vietnamese society, including the military struggle, it is impossible to understand NLF/PAVN organization, strategy and tactics without detailing party involvement. The bulk of the VC/NLF were initially southerners, with some distinctive southern issues and sensibilities. Nevertheless, the VC/NLF was clearly a creature of the Northern Lao Dong Party which manipulated and controlled it -furnishing it with supplies, weaponry and trained cadres, including regular PAVN troops posing as "local" fighters.

Hanoi also organized the Southern Communist party, the People's Revolutionary Party (PRP) in 1962, to mobilize communist party membership among southerners, and COSVN, Central Office for Southern Vietnam, which controlled a substantial range of military activity. While a measure of decentralization was necessary to pursue the conflict locally, the PRP, and COVSN, answered ultimately to their Northern handlers. The PAVN likewise was controlled by the PAVN High Command, which answered to the Lao Dong, with party committees and representatives supervising and monitoring all echelons. As the war progressed, southern influence weakened, and the northern grip, both military and politically via the Lao Dong Party, was strengthened. This development was lamented by some former VC personnel who were forced off the stage by the northerners.

Operating through the PRP, northern cadres, COSVN, and various front groups, communist leadership in Hanoi developed military and propaganda capabilities, gaining support within South Vietnam and internationally. Though heavily reliant on the Soviet Union and China for arms and equipment, North Vietnam maintained strategic autonomy by balancing its relationships with both major communist powers. This leadership ultimately secured victory in 1975 following nearly two decades of conflict.

=== Geographic commands ===
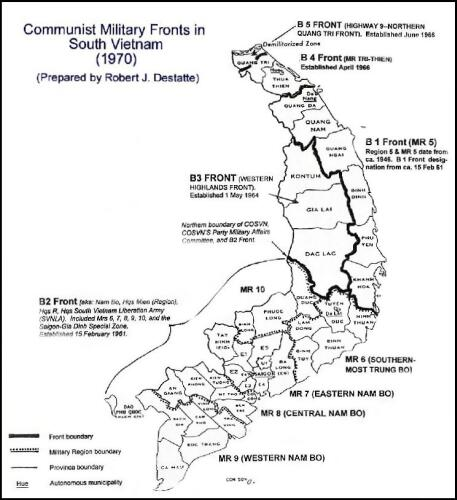
Military regions, 1970

The PAVN High Command supervised all regular PAVN forces, but also some Main Force VC formations in the two northernmost Military Regions, and the B-3 Front (Western Highlands). Military Affairs Committees were coordinating groups that liaisoned and coordinated activity with the Central Reunification Department, another coordination body for the complex effort. Each front was a military command but was supervised also by regional Party committees set up by Hanoi's Politburo. The deeper PAVN formations moved into South Vietnam, the more coordination was needed with NLF/VC and regional forces. Hence COVSN was prominent in the southernmost areas, closest to the Cambodian border, where it had its headquarters. COVSN supervised VC forces (Main Force, Regional and Village Guerrilla) in this zone.

There were five geographic/area commands covering South Vietnam in terms of military operations. These zones evolved from a simpler two-front division during the early phases of the conflict. The names given below are approximate. More detailed subdivisions existed.

- B-5 "Quang Tri" Front
- B-4 "Tri Thien" Front
- B-3 "Western Highlands" Front
- B-1 Military Region Five Front
- B-2 "Nam-bo" Front

=== VC structure and organization ===
Simplified view of the VC organization. Functions such as security or propaganda were duplicated at each admin. level.

A creature of the Northern regime, the overall Viet Cong structure was made up of three parts:

1. The Southern Communist Party- the PRP, controlled the VC effort on behalf of Hanoi's Lao Dong party. Hanoi coordinated its direction through the COSVN, Central Office for South Vietnam.
2. The NLF- National Liberation Front, a collection of groups, and sympathizers opposed to the Diem government and its successors or sympathizing with the communist cause. Some groups were deliberately created fronts of the PRP, or were taken over and manipulated. Others were loosely affiliated supporters or well-wishers.
3. The Liberation Armed Forces- the armed, military wing of the Viet Cong which carried out military operations

The 5-level administrative structure. Publicly, the NLF was part of a spontaneous people's movement for liberation. In reality it was controlled by COSVN, which in turn was controlled by the Lao Dong party. Some writers suggest that COVSN was an executive committee of the PRP, the Southern Communist Party, with associated staff for coordinating the war effort, but the exact structural arrangements remain ambiguous. The NLF was organized into 3 Interzone headquarters, that were subdivided into 7 smaller headquarters Zones. The Zones were split into Provinces and further subdivided into Districts. These likewise controlled Village and Hamlet elements. Each level was run by a committee, dominated as always by Communist Party operatives.

Military structure of the PLAF. The People's Liberation Armed Forces (aka "VC" in common usage) was the actual military muscle of the insurgency. The PLAF was also controlled by COVSN, which took its orders from the North. For military purposes South Vietnam was divided into 6 military regions, in turn broken down by province, district, village and hamlet. A military structure thus stood parallel with, and operated with the NLF "front" structure as cover, lending a popular gloss to the insurgency. Each level in theory was subject to the dictates of the next highest one. Interlocking party memberships, committees, and groupings like COSVN assured coordination between the NLF, the PLAF, the PRP (southern communist party), and Hanoi's war directors. Indeed, party membership was required to hold most significant command positions within the PLAF, and party operatives supervised activity all the way down to the hamlet level.

Three tier VC military formation: The VC/PLAF military formations were generally grouped into 3 echelons.

- VC Main-Force Units. The elite of the VC were the chu luc or Main Force Units, made up of full-time fighters. These units generally reported to one of the Interzone headquarters or were controlled directly by COSVN. Many of the soldiers were southern-born and had been trained in the north before re-infiltrating back to serve the Revolution. A majority of main-force fighters were party members, wore the pith helmet common to the PAVN, carried the same weapons, and could operate in battalion or even regimental size strengths. A typical battalion was similar to a PAVN one, with 400–600 men organized into 3 infantry companies backed by a fire support company. Recon, signals, sapper and logistics units rounded out the formation.
- The Regional Forces. Regional or territorial units were also full-time soldiers but they generally served within or close to their home provinces. They did not have the degree of literacy of the main-force personnel, and did not have the percentage of Party members present in their ranks. They were not as well armed as the chu luc and usually operated in units that seldom exceeded company strength.
- Village guerrillas. Village, hamlet or local guerrillas were part-time fighters and helpers, carrying out minor harassment operations like sniping or mine/booby trap laying, building local fortifications or supply caches, and transporting supplies and equipment. Mostly peasant farmers, these militia style units were under the control of low level NLF or Front leadership.
- Transitions. Although manpower shortages sometimes intervened, a hierarchical promotion system was generally followed between the 3- levels. Promising guerrilla level operatives were moved up to the Regional Forces, and promising Regional Force fighters were promoted to the full-time Main Force units. This ensured that the Main Forces received the best personnel, with some seasoning under their belts.

=== PAVN structure and organization ===
The PAVN High Command retained control of PAVN regular formations. Individual PAVN might be used as replacement fillers for VC Main Force units

==== Organization of NLF/PAVN units in the field ====
The typical PAVN division had a strength of approximately 10,000 men grouped into three infantry regiments, with a supporting artillery regiment or battalion, and signals, engineers, medical and logistic formations. The artillery units were generally armed with mortars although they might use heavier weapons in an extended set-piece operation. The regiments were generally broken down into 3 foot-soldier battalions of 500–600 men each, along with the supporting units. Each battalion in turn was subdivided into companies and platoons, with heavy weapons units augmenting the small arms of the line troops.

Both the NLF and PAVN formations operated under a "system of three" – three cells to a squad, three squads to a platoon, 3 companies to a battalion etc. This could vary depending on operational circumstances. Small-arms dominated the armament of typical infantry battalions, which deployed the standard infantry companies, logistical support, and heavy weapons sub-units of modern formations. Heavier weapons like 82 mm mortars or recoilless rifles and machine guns were at the battalions combat support company. Members of the combat support unit were also responsible for placing mines and booby traps. Special detachments or platoons included sappers, recon, signals, etc. and were directly responsible to the battalion commander.

==== General command and control ====
Command and control was exercised via standard headquarters companies, always supervised by political cadres. While PAVN formations retained their insignia, signals and logistic lines, supervision followed the same pattern, with Party monitors at every level- from squad to division. Recruitment and training as discussed above was conducted in the North, and replacements were funneled from the North, down the Ho Chi Minh Trail to designated formations. Individual PAVN soldiers might be sometimes be assigned as replacement fillers for NLF Main Force Battalions.

Where distinct PAVN formations were kept intact, they remained under the control of the PAVN High command, although this was, like other military echelons, controlled in turn by the Northern Lao Dong Party. The NLF "front" framework, gave political cover to these military efforts. Since Party operatives were in place at all levels throughout the entire structure, coordination and control of the vast politico-military effort was enhanced.

=== Morale and discipline: the 3-man cell and "self-criticism" ===
- 3-man cells. All soldiers were grouped into 3-man cells. These had practical advantages in mutual support and assistance among soldiers, but when combined with the constant monitoring of the political cadres, they had the benefit of discouraging individual privacy, and potential thoughts of defection. Monitoring by other cell members was inherent in the system. By most accounts given by NLF/PAVN prisoners or defectors, the cell system served as a powerful instrument of cohesion.
- Criticism and self-criticism. Typical of most Maoist communist organizations, "criticism and self-criticism" sessions were frequently conducted to improve discipline, control and cohesion. Such sessions were conducted on a daily basis and after operations. Of key importance was individual confession of faults or errors, and the detection and purging of incorrect thoughts as a basis for behavioral changes. Leaders first critiqued individual soldiers, who in turn were critiqued by their comrades. Admission of faults and weaknesses was then expected from individuals. Lower ranks were not allowed to comment on the actions of higher ranks. Most communist troops seemed to accept the system, especially when it was conducted in a way that suggested Confucian ideals- that of an elder father or brother correcting wayward youth or siblings.

=== Role of the Party cadres and officers ===
At all levels of the structure, the control of the Communist party was constant. Party operatives manipulated civilian front groups and sympathizers, as well as military units. Cadres were assigned to each level of the structure, a "parallel" administration that constantly supervised and watched those tasked with the activities of the Revolution. Commanders of some military units, or leaders of various propaganda and civic fronts might also be Party members, operating openly or undercover.

Cadres were expected to be of exemplary proletarian, moral and political character, faithfully implementing the most recent party line, and monitoring assigned areas for erroneous thought. Class background was important with those from the middle and upper-classes receiving less favorable treatment. Of special importance was the activities of cadres in morale building and in organizing the ubiquitous "criticism and self-criticism" sessions.

The cadre system was a constant in both the NLF Main Force and PAVN formations down to the company level. Cadres had their own chain of command, parallel with that of the military structure. In any disputes between military officers and the political operatives, the political officers generally had the last word.

=== Organizational effectiveness ===
The Communist command structure was complex, with a series of interlocking committees and directorates, all controlled by the Central Committee of Hanoi's Lao Dong (Communist) Party. This same pattern of interlocking groups was repeated further down the chain to the lowliest hamlet- all controlled by party operatives.

This elaborate structure often appears ponderous to Western eyes, but it was extremely well adapted to the demands of the war effort, and its built in overlapping, duplication and redundancy made it resilient and able to adjust to defections, captures or deaths among its members. While the North Vietnamese and their allies made elaborate attempts to camouflage the organizational arrangements that drove the war, both the armed Viet Cong (properly the PLAF), and the regular troops of the PAVN were ultimately one joint force. Each had its distinct local characteristics, recruitment paths, resource bases, and missions, but collectively they were controlled as one by Hanoi, and are treated as such in official communist histories of the war.

== Use of terror ==
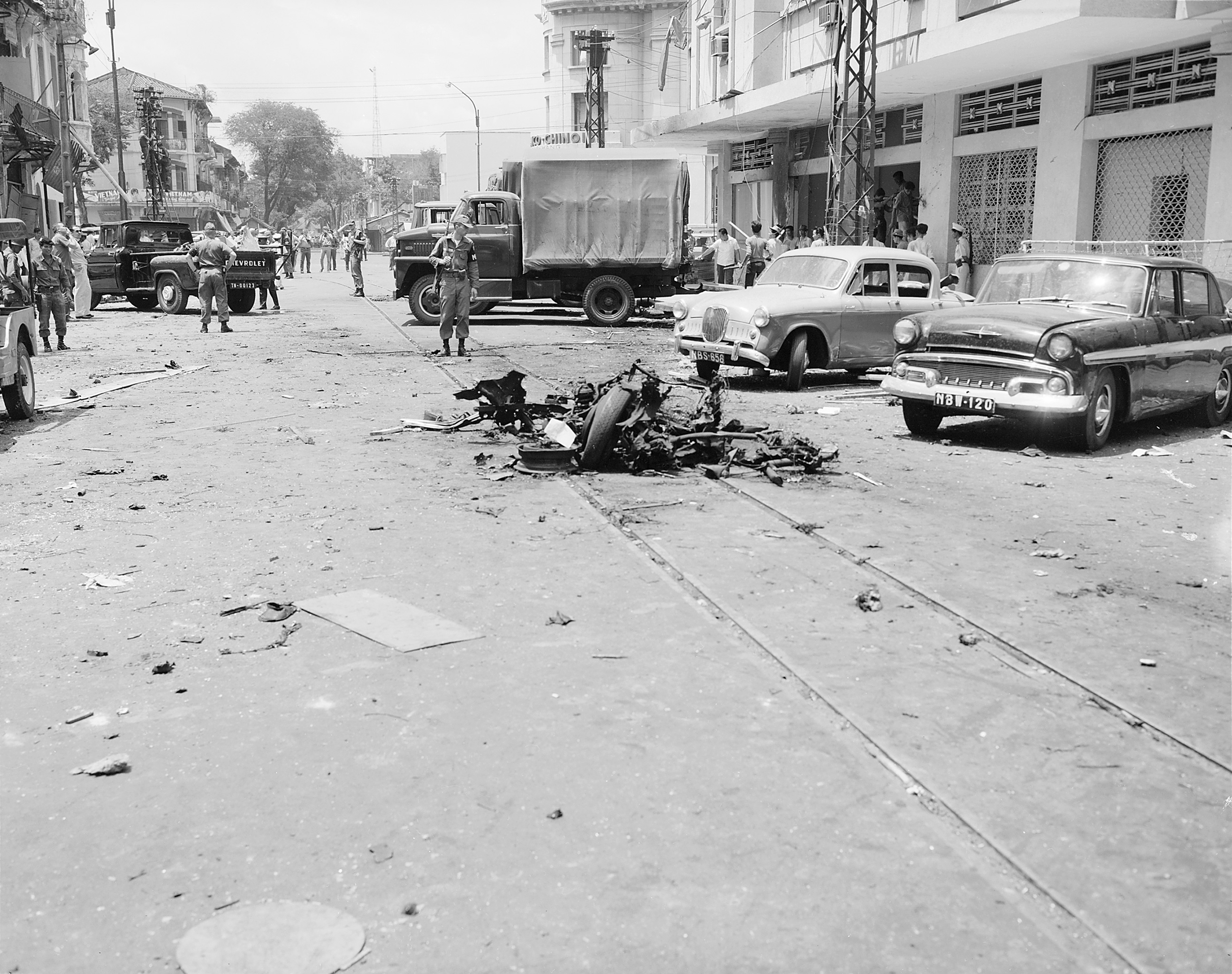
Scene of Viet Cong bombing in Saigon, 1965

Murder, kidnapping, torture and general intimidation were a routine part of NLF/PAVN operations and were calculated to cow the populace, liquidate opponents, erode the morale of the South Vietnamese government employees, and boost tax collection and propaganda efforts. This extensive use of terror on a daily basis received comparatively little attention from Western journalists occupied with covering the big unit war. Terror was meant to demonstrate that both the rural and urban dweller were powerless against the Viet Cong and that the government could not protect them. Terror extended beyond targeted murders and kidnappings, and included the frequent mortaring of civilians in refugee camps, and the placing of mines on highways frequented by villagers taking their goods to urban markets. Some mines were set only to go off after heavy vehicle passage, causing extensive slaughter aboard packed civilian buses.

Another terror method involved deliberate random shelling of populated areas with 122-mm rockets. Areas victimized included Saigon, Danang and other major cities. At other times the Viet Cong eschewed the use of stand-off weapons and directly attacked villages and hamlets with the express intention of killing men, women and children to sow havoc, panic and insecurity. A 1968 attack on the hamlet of Son Tra in Quang Ngai province for example, used flamethrowers to incinerate 78 civilians, wounded many more, and destroyed most of the hamlet.

Terror results could also be achieved by provoking hasty reaction or retaliation attacks by ARVN or American forces on villagers through sniping, raids, or placing of mines and booby traps in and near villages or hamlets. Such reactions had the benefit of sparking potential atrocities that could be used later in propaganda to help mobilize or radicalize elements of the populace. A 1965 Christian Science Monitor article by Japanese journalist Takashi Oka reported on what seemed to be use of the method. The VC entered a village and harangued the local populace about supporting the Revolution before digging in, and passing word to the district capital that they were active in the community. One day later, US planes bombed the village and its Catholic Church. VC operatives emerged after the destruction to tell survivors about the perfidy of the US imperialists. Such methods could sometimes backfire however, with villagers blaming Front forces for the destruction and death brought to their communities.

Several spectacular incidents of terror stand out in NLF/PAVN operations, although these were not publicized in the Western media to the extent of the American-perpetrated My Lai Massacre.

Massacre at Hue: During Tet for example, Communist forces seemed to have carefully planned for mass killings, with prepared hitlists carried both by the rebelling VC units and local infrastructure operatives. One of the sites of the worse atrocity was the city of Hue.

Civil servants, officers, teachers and religious figures were rounded up first and executed after quick "revolutionary" trials. A second roundup fingered leaders of civic organizations, intellectuals, professionals and individual civilians and their families who had worked for the Americans. A barber for example who had cut the hair of Americans had both his hands cut off before being liquidated.

The greatest number of people eliminated however appeared to be during the Viet Cong retreat from the city. They were usually shot and buried in well-concealed mass graves that were eventually to yield some 2,800 corpses. Lack of visible wounds on some bodies, including 2 Catholic priests, indicated that they had been buried alive. The 2,800 bodies in Hue were part of a larger group of some 5,800 civilians in the city targeted in Viet Cong attacks for liquidation or abduction. Most of the remaining victims have never been found.

Đắk Sơn: 1967 the VC used flamethrowers to incinerate 252 civilians, mostly women and children at the village of Đắk Sơn, in Phước Long Province.

Thanh My: In 1970, at the village of Thanh My, near Da Nang, the PAVN killed an estimated 100 civilians as they huddled in bunkers for shelter, by tossing in grenades and satchel charges.

Hit squads and assassinations. During the early years of the war, assassinations and other similar activity was organized via "special activity cells" of the VC. As the conflict extended, efforts were centralized under the VC Security Service estimated to number 25,000 men by 1970. By 1969, nearly 250 civilians were being murdered or kidnapped each week. The total tally of the NLF/PAVN terror squads from 1967 to 1972 stands at over 36,000 murders and almost 58,000 kidnappings according to one US Department of Defense estimate, c. 1973. Statistics for 1968–72 suggest that "about 80 percent of the terrorist victims were ordinary civilians and only about 20 percent were government officials, policemen, members of the self-defence forces or pacification cadres."

Communist forces and spokesmen consistently denied using any terror, and attributed the mass graves at Hue to spontaneous action by various aggrieved peoples of the city. The use of terror however is encouraged in official NLF documents, such as COSVN Resolution Number 9, published in July 1969, which noted: "Integral to the political struggle would be the liberal use of terrorism to weaken and destroy local government, strengthen the party apparatus, proselyte among the populace, erode the control and influence of the Government of Vietnam, and weaken the RVNAF."

== Intelligence ==
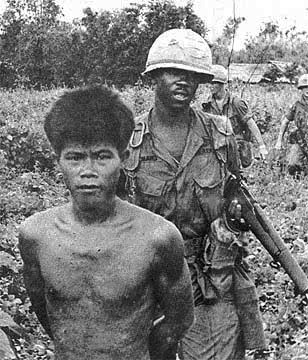
Viet Cong prisoner - 25th Infantry division- 1967

Communist forces deployed an extensive and sophisticated intelligence apparatus within South Vietnam, extending from the top echelons of the Southern regime, to village level guerrilla helpers informing on ARVN troop movements. Such was the penetration of the GVN that after the war the Communist government presented a medal to one of the top aides to South Vietnamese Prime Minister Nguyen Cao Ky. Ironically, the de facto chief of the South Vietnamese General Staff who was present on the last day of the war in Saigon (1975), was, according to Vietnamese sources, also a northern agent. Substantial assistance to the southern insurgency was rendered by the North via its Central Research Agency (CRA). This fifth-column built on the anti-French resistance of the Vietminh. The American CIA claimed that by the late 1960s, more than 30,000 enemy agents had infiltrated the GVN's "administrative, police, armed forces and intelligence" operations.

In the South, the NLF's COVSN organization supervised intelligence efforts, deploying a secret police in communist controlled areas, a bodyguard service for VIPs and most importantly, a "People's Intelligence System." Networks of informers were numerous and the system used blackmail, threats and propaganda to secure the cooperation of GVN functionaries, often working through their relatives. One South Vietnamese study of the communist apparatus cited several examples of intelligence gathering for the Front (NLF/PAVN) forces:

- A bicycle repairman on the road that reported on military traffic
- A farmer counting the number and type of aircraft that landed and took off on the airstrip near his fields
- A peasant woman outside her hut reporting on the size and composition of enemy troops by pre-arranged signal, when they approached.

== See also ==
- ARVN
- Communism
- Hans von Dach
- Guerrilla warfare
- History of Vietnam
- Ho Chi Minh Trail
- Military Assistance Command, Vietnam Studies and Observations Group
- NLF and PAVN logistics and equipment
- NLF and PAVN battle tactics
- Tet Offensive
- The United States and the Vietnam War
- Vietnam War
- Weapons of the Vietnam War
- Mass killings under communist regimes

== Notes ==
=== References ===
- Anderson, M.; Arnsten, M.; Averch, H. (1967). Insurgent Organization and Operations: A Case Study of the Viet Cong in the Delta, 1964–1966. Santa Monica: Rand Corp. RM-5239-1-ISA/ARPA.
- Davidson, Philip Davidson (1988). Vietnam at War: The History, 1946–1975. Presidio Press. ISBN 9780891413066.
- Doyle, Edward; Weiss, Stephen (1984). A Collision of Cultures: The Vietnam Experience. Boston Publishing Company. ISBN 9780939526123.
- Doyle, Edward; Lipsman, Samuel; Maitland, Terrence (1986). The North: The Vietnam Experience. Boston Publishing Company. ISBN 9780939526215.
- Hennessy, Michael A. (1997). Strategy in Vietnam: The Marines and Revolutionary Warfare in I Corps, 1965–1972. Praeger Publishers.
- Karnow, Stanley (1983). Vietnam: A History. Viking Press. ISBN 9780670746040.
- Krepinevich, Andrew F. Jr. (1986). The Army and Vietnam. Baltimore, MD: Johns Hopkins University Press. ISBN 9780801828638.
- Lanning, Michael Lee; Cragg, Dan (1993). Inside the VC and the NVA. Ballantine Books.
- Lewy, Gunther (1978). America in Vietnam. Oxford University Press.
- Maitland, Terrence (1983). A Contagion of War: The Vietnam Expercience Series. Boston Publishing Company. ISBN 9780939526055.
- Pike, Douglas (1986). PAVN: People's Army of Vietnam. Presidio. ISBN 9780891412434.
- Prados, John (1998). The Blood Road. New York: John Wiley and Sons.
- Sorley, Lewis (2007). A Better War: The Unexamined Victories and Final Tragedy of America's Last Years in Vietnam. Harvest Books.
- Tucker, Spencer (1999). Vietnam. Routledge.
