= Phoenix Program =

CIA-led effort to eliminate the Viet Cong during the Vietnam War

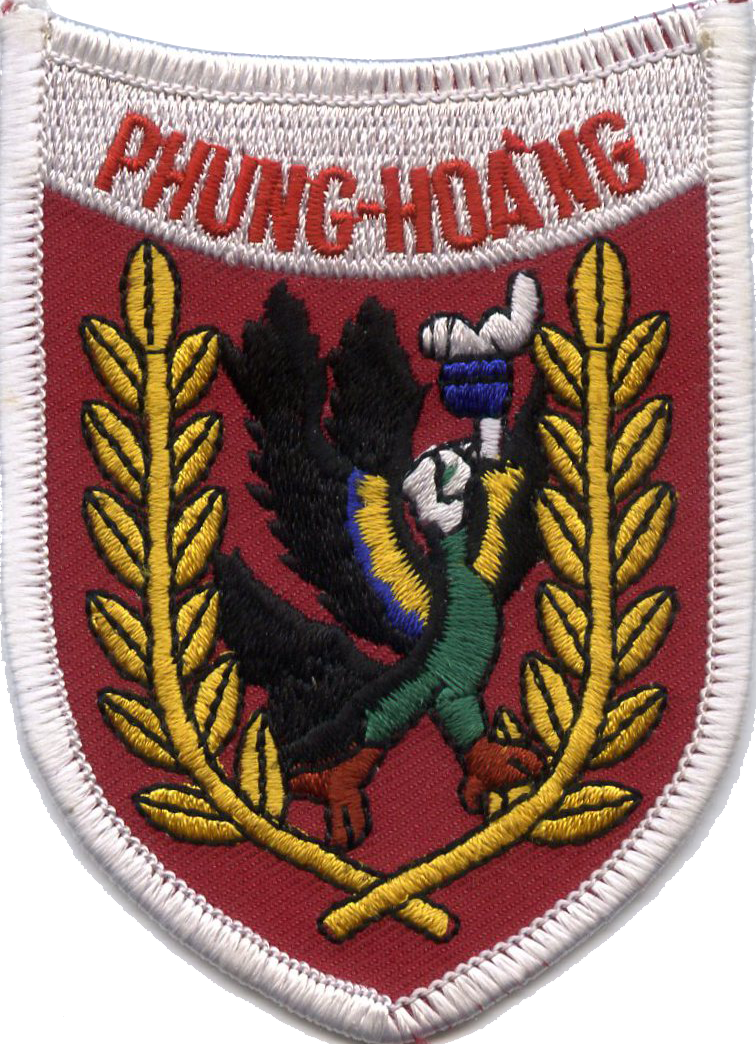
Original unissued patch

The Phoenix Program (Vietnamese: Chiến dịch Phụng Hoàng) was designed and initially coordinated by the United States Central Intelligence Agency (CIA) during the Vietnam War, involving the American and South Vietnamese militaries, and a small number of special forces operatives from the Australian Army Training Team Vietnam. In 1970, CIA responsibility was phased out, and the program was put under the authority of the Civil Operations and Revolutionary Development Support (CORDS).

The program, which lasted from 1968 to 1972, was designed to identify and destroy the Viet Cong (VC) via infiltration, assassination, torture, capture, counter-terrorism, and interrogation. The CIA described it as "a set of programs that sought to attack and destroy the political infrastructure of the Viet Cong." The Phoenix Program was premised on the idea that North Vietnamese infiltration had required local support within noncombat civilian populations, which were referred to as the "VC infrastructure" and "political branch" that had purportedly coordinated the insurgency.

Throughout the program, Phoenix "neutralized" 81,740 people suspected of VC membership, of whom 26,369 were killed, and the rest surrendered or were captured. Of those killed 87% were attributed to conventional military operations by South Vietnamese and American forces, while the remaining 13% were attributed to Phoenix Program operatives.

The Phoenix Program was heavily criticized on various grounds, including the number of neutral civilians killed, the nature of the program (which critics have labelled as a "civilian assassination program,") the use of torture and other coercive methods, and the program being exploited for personal politics. Nevertheless, the program was very successful at suppressing VC political and revolutionary activities. Public disclosure of the program led to significant criticism, including hearings by the US Congress, and the CIA was pressured into shutting it down. A similar program, Plan F-6, continued under the government of South Vietnam.

== Background ==
Shortly after the 1954 Geneva Conference and the adoption of the Geneva Accords, the government of North Vietnam organized a force of several thousand to mobilize support for the communists in the upcoming elections. When it became clear that the elections would not take place, these forces became the seeds of what would eventually become the Viet Cong, a North Vietnamese insurgency whose goal was unification of Vietnam under the control of the North.

While counterinsurgency efforts had been ongoing since the first days of US military involvement in Vietnam, they had been unsuccessful with dealing with either the armed VC or the VC's civilian infrastructure (VCI) which swelled to between 80,000 and 150,000 members by the mid 1960's. The VCI, unlike the armed component of the VC, was tasked with support activities including recruiting, political indoctrination, psychological operations, intelligence collection, and logistical support. The VCI rapidly set up shadow governments in rural South Vietnam by replacing local leadership in small rural hamlets loyal to the Saigon government with communist cadres. The VCI chose small rural villages because they lacked close supervision of the Saigon government or the South Vietnamese Army

VCI tactics for establishing local communist control began by identifying towns and villages with strategic importance to either the VC or North Vietnamese People's Army of Vietnam and local populations with communist sympathies with the Hanoi government putting a great deal of emphasis on the activities and success of the VCI. After a community was identified, the VCI would threaten local leadership with reprisals if they refused to cooperate or kidnap local leaders and send them to reeducation camps in North Vietnam. Local leaders who continued to refuse to cooperate or threatened to contact the Saigon government were murdered along with their families. After VCI agents took control of an area it would be used to quarter and resupply VC guerrillas, supplying intelligence on US and South Vietnamese military movements, providing taxes to VCI cadres, and conscripting locals into the VC.

== History ==
By April 1965, the CIA Counter-Terror Program supported 140 teams of between three and 12 men each. Aimed exclusively at the VCI, the teams claimed a kill ratio in excess of eight to one.

On 9 May 1967 all pacification efforts by the United States came under the authority of the Civil Operations and Revolutionary Development Support (CORDS). In June 1967, as part of CORDS, the Intelligence Coordination and Exploitation Program (ICEX) was created, from a plan drafted by Nelson Brickham. The purpose of the organization centered on gathering and coordinating information on the VC. In December 1967 the South Vietnamese Prime Minister signed a decree establishing Phụng Hoàng, named after the mythical bird, to coordinate the numerous South Vietnamese entities involved in the anti-VCI campaign. The 1968 Tet Offensive demonstrated the importance of the VCI. In July 1968 South Vietnamese President Nguyễn Văn Thiệu signed a decree implementing Phụng Hoàng.

The major two components of the program were Provincial Reconnaissance Units (PRUs) and regional interrogation centers. PRUs would kill or capture suspected VC members, as well as civilians who were thought to have information on VC activities. Many of these people were taken to interrogation centers and were tortured in an attempt to gain intelligence on VC activities in the area. The information extracted at the centers was given to military commanders, who would use it to task the PRU with further capture and assassination missions. The program's effectiveness was measured in the number of VC members who were "neutralized", a euphemism meaning imprisoned, persuaded to defect, or killed.

The interrogation centers and PRUs were originally developed by the CIA's Saigon station chief Peer de Silva. DeSilva was a proponent of a military strategy known as counter-terrorism, which encompasses military tactics and techniques that government, military, law enforcement, and intelligence agencies use to combat or prevent terrorist activities, and that it should be applied strategically to "enemy civilians" in order to reduce civilian support for the VC. The PRUs were designed with this in mind, and began targeting suspected VC members in 1964. Originally, the PRUs were known as "Counter Terror" teams, but they were renamed to "Provincial Reconnaissance Units" after CIA officials "became wary of the adverse publicity surrounding the use of the word 'terror'".

Officially, Phoenix operations continued until December 1972, although certain aspects continued until the fall of Saigon in 1975.

== Agencies and individuals involved in the program ==
- Central Intelligence Agency
- United States special operations forces
- U.S. Army intelligence collection units from the U.S. Military Assistance Command, Vietnam (MACV—the joint-service command that provided command and control for all U.S. advisory and assistance efforts in Vietnam)
- US Navy SEAL Detachment Bravo
- USMC, 1st Force Reconnaissance Company stationed near Da Nang
- Special forces operatives from the Australian Army Training Team Vietnam (AATTV)
- Republic of Vietnam National Police Field Force

== Operations ==
The chief aspect of the Phoenix Program was the collection of intelligence information. VC members would then be captured, converted, or killed. Emphasis for the enforcement of the operation was placed on local government militia and police forces, rather than the military, as the main operational arm of the program. According to journalist Douglas Valentine, "Central to Phoenix is the fact that it targeted civilians, not soldiers".

The Phoenix Program took place under special laws that allowed the arrest and prosecution of suspected communists. To avoid abuses such as phony accusations for personal reasons, or to rein in overzealous officials who might not be diligent enough in pursuing evidence before making arrests, the laws required three separate sources of evidence to convict an individual targeted for neutralization. If a suspected VC member was found guilty, they could be held in prison for two years, with renewable two-year sentences totaling up to six years. According to MACV Directive 381-41, the intent of Phoenix was to attack the VC with a "rifle shot rather than a shotgun approach to target key political leaders, command/control elements and activists in the VCI [Viet Cong Infrastructure]." The VCI was known by the communists as the Revolutionary Infrastructure.

Heavy-handed operations—such as random cordons and searches, large-scale and lengthy detentions of innocent civilians, and excessive use of firepower—had a negative effect on the civilian population. Intelligence derived from interrogations was often used to carry out "search and destroy" missions aimed at finding and killing VC members.

87% of those killed during the Phoenix Program were killed in conventional military operations. Many of those killed were only identified as members of the VCI following military engagements, which were often started by the VC. Between January 1970 and March 1971, 94% of those killed as a result of the program were killed during military operations (9,827 out of 10,443 VCI killed).

=== Torture ===
Torture was carried out by South Vietnamese forces with the CIA and special forces playing a supervisory role, however witnesses have stated "American advisers routinely carried out torture" as well.

According to Valentine, methods of torture that were utilized at the interrogation centers included:

Rape, gang rape, rape using eels, snakes, or hard objects, and rape followed by murder; electrical shock ("the Bell Telephone Hour") rendered by attaching wires to the genitals or other sensitive parts of the body, like the tongue; "the water treatment"; "the airplane," in which a prisoner's arms were tied behind the back and the rope looped over a hook on the ceiling, suspending the prisoner in midair, after which he or she was beaten; beatings with rubber hoses and whips; and the use of police dogs to maul prisoners.

Military intelligence officer K. Barton Osborn reports that he witnessed "the use of the insertion of the 6-inch dowel into the canal of one of my detainee's ears, and the tapping through the brain until dead. The starvation to death (in a cage), of a Vietnamese woman who was suspected of being part of the local political education cadre in one of the local villages ... The use of electronic gear such as sealed telephones attached to ... both the women's vaginas and men's testicles [to] shock them into submission."

According to author Gary Kulik, Osborn made exaggerated, contradictory and false claims and that his colleagues stated that he liked making "fantastic statements" and that he "frequently made exaggerated remarks in order to attract attention to himself." Mark Woodruff has claimed that Osborn served with the United States Marine Corps in the I Corps in 1967–1968 before the Phoenix Program was implemented. On the other hand, during testimony to the U.S. Congress, "CIA Director William Colby conceded that much of what Osborn said was likely to be true," despite "attempts by conservatives to discredit Osborn’s character." Similarly, historian Alfred McCoy writes that "To discredit [Osborn's] damaging testimony, the U.S. Army Intelligence Command conducted a thorough investigation of Osborn’s charges," however "Although the Army’s classified report nitpicked many of his secondary details, it did not challenge Osborn’s overall sense of Phoenix’s systematic brutality—an assessment confirmed by both eye-witness accounts and official studies." In early 1968, CORDS conducted an internal review of the program, finding that: "The truncheon and electric shock method of interrogation were in widespread use, with almost all [U.S.] advisers admitting to have witnessed instances of the use of these methods." According to the government report, "Most advisers claimed they did not personally take part in [tortures] but 'turned their backs on them.'"

=== Targeted killings ===
Phoenix operations often aimed to assassinate targets or kill them through other means. PRU units often anticipated resistance in disputed areas, and often operated on a shoot-first basis. Lieutenant Vincent Okamoto, an intelligence-liaison officer for the Phoenix Program for two months in 1968 and a recipient of the Distinguished Service Cross said the following:

The problem was, how do you find the people on the blacklist? It's not like you had their address and telephone number. The normal procedure would be to go into a village and just grab someone and say, "Where's Nguyen so-and-so?" Half the time the people were so afraid they would not say anything. Then a Phoenix team would take the informant, put a sandbag over his head, poke out two holes so he could see, put commo wire around his neck like a long leash, and walk him through the village and say, "When we go by Nguyen's house scratch your head." Then that night Phoenix would come back, knock on the door, and say, "April Fool, motherfucker." Whoever answered the door would get wasted. As far as they were concerned whoever answered was a Communist, including family members. Sometimes they'd come back to camp with ears to prove that they killed people.

William Colby denied that the program was an assassination program stating: "To call it a program of murder is nonsense ... They were of more value to us alive than dead, and therefore, the object was to get them alive." His instructions to field officers stated "Our training emphasizes the desirability of obtaining these target individuals alive and of using intelligent and lawful methods of interrogation to obtain the truth of what they know about other aspects of the VCI ... [U.S. personnel] are specifically not authorized to engage in assassinations or other violations of the rules of land warfare."

== Strategic and operational effect ==
Between 1968 and 1972, Phoenix officially "neutralized" (meaning imprisoned, persuaded to defect, or killed) 81,740 people suspected of VC membership, of whom 26,369 were killed, while Seymour Hersh wrote that South Vietnamese official statistics estimated that 41,000 were killed. A significant number of VC were killed, and between 1969 and 1971, the program was quite successful in destroying VC infrastructure in many important areas. 87 percent of those killed in the program were attributed to conventional military operations by South Vietnamese and American forces; the remainder were killed by Phoenix Program operatives.

By 1970, communist plans repeatedly emphasized attacking the government's pacification program and specifically targeted Phoenix officials. The VC imposed assassination quotas. In 1970, for example, communist officials near Da Nang in northern South Vietnam instructed their assassins to "kill 1,400 persons" deemed to be government "tyrant[s]" and to "annihilate" anyone involved with the pacification program.

Several North Vietnamese officials have made statements about the effectiveness of Phoenix. According to William Colby, "in the years since 1975, I have heard several references to North and South Vietnamese communists who state that, in their mind, the toughest period that they faced from 1960 to 1975 was the period from 1968 to '72 when the Phoenix Program was at work." The CIA said that through Phoenix they were able to learn the identity and structure of the VCI in every province.

According to Stuart A. Herrington: "Regardless of how effective the Phoenix Program was or wasn't, area by area, the communists thought it was very effective. They saw it as a significant threat to the viability of the revolution because, to the extent that you could ... carve out the shadow government, their means of control over the civilian population was dealt a death blow. And that's why, when the war was over, the North Vietnamese reserved "special treatment" for those who had worked in the Phoenix Program. They considered it a mortal threat to the revolution."

== Public response and legal proceedings ==
The Phoenix Program was not generally known during most of the time it was operational to either the American public or American officials in Washington. In 1970, author Frances FitzGerald made several arguments to then-U.S. National Security Advisor Henry Kissinger against the program, which she alludes to in Fire in the Lake. One of the first people to criticize Phoenix publicly was Ed Murphy, a peace activist and former military intelligence soldier, in 1970.

There was eventually a series of U.S. Congressional hearings. In 1971, in the final day of hearing on "U.S. Assistance Programs in Vietnam", Osborn described the Phoenix Program as a "sterile depersonalized murder program." Consequently, the military command in Vietnam issued a directive that reiterated that it had based the anti-VCI campaign on South Vietnamese law, that the program was in compliance with the laws of land warfare, and that U.S. personnel had the responsibility to report breaches of the law.

Former CIA analyst Samuel A. Adams, in an interview with CBC News, talked about the program as basically an assassination program that also included torture. They would also kill people by throwing them out of helicopters to threaten and intimidate those they wanted to interrogate. While acknowledging that "No one can prove the null hypothesis that no prisoner was ever thrown from a helicopter," Gary Kulik states that "no such story has ever been corroborated" and that the noise inside a helicopter would make conducting an interrogation impossible.

According to Nick Turse, abuses were common. In many instances, rival Vietnamese would report their enemies as "VC" in order to get U.S. troops to kill them. In many cases, Phung Hoang chiefs were incompetent bureaucrats who used their positions to enrich themselves. Phoenix tried to address this problem by establishing monthly neutralization quotas, but these often led to fabrications or, worse, false arrests. In some cases, district officials accepted bribes from the VC to release certain suspects.

After Phoenix Program abuses began receiving negative publicity, the program was officially shut down, although it continued under the name Plan F-6 with the government of South Vietnam in control. (Note: For more information F-6, see Andradé 1990, pp. 246–250; Vietnam Courier 1972, p. 116; (Note: For the reliability and biases of this newspaper, see Gidlund 1967) In Thieu's Prisons 1973, pp. 152–152; Nomination of William E. Colby 1973, p. 156; CounterSpy 1973; Subversion of law enforcement intelligence gathering 1976, p. 11; Moyar 1997, p. 208; Hunt 1995, p. 243)

== See also ==
- Edward Lansdale
- Nguyễn Hợp Đoàn
- Operation Condor
- Russell Tribunal
- Special Activities Division
- Tran Ngoc Chau
- United States war crimes
- Vietnam War Crimes Working Group
- Winter Soldier Investigation
