= Nelson Brickham =

American CIA officer

Nelson Henry Brickham, Jr. (23 January 1927 – 1 February 2007) was a Central Intelligence Agency officer, best known for his role in developing the Phoenix Program.

== Career ==
Brickham graduated from Yale University in 1949, and joined the Central Intelligence Agency the same year. After some years in the Directorate of Intelligence, he transferred to the Operations Division in 1955, serving in the Soviet-Russia Division. In 1960 Brickham was posted to Teheran, managing intelligence and counterintelligence operations against Soviet targets in Iran. By 1964 he was working in the Sino-Soviet Relations Branch.

In 1965-66 Brickham was the senior CIA officer in charge of Foreign Intelligence Field Operations throughout South Vietnam. In 1966 Saigon station chief John Limond Hart assigned Brickham to Robert Komer's staff, where in late 1966 to June 1967 Brickham developed ICEX-SIDE (later renamed the Phoenix Program) as a single organizational structure to coordinate intelligence, military and police activities in Vietnam. The system was modelled on the Ford Motor Company's executive staff structure. It was also inspired in part by David Galula's Counterinsurgency Warfare (1964), a book based on Galula's experiences in the Algerian War which Brickham was "very taken" with and carried with him around Vietnam.
