= Revolutionary Infrastructure =

Policy of the Communist Party of Vietnam

The Revolutionary Infrastructure (Vietnamese Hạ tầng cơ sở cách mạng), was designed by the Communist Party of Vietnam in the 1940s.

== Description ==
Revolutionary Infrastructure was the official title used by the Communist Party for their covert administrative system. During the First Indochina War the French labeled it l’infrastructure Clandestine Việt Minh whereas the Americans referred to it as the Việt Cộng Infrastructure (VCI) during the Vietnam War.

The Communist Party defined the Revolutionary Infrastructure as generally comprising three elements: “Communist Party cells,” which were then linked together by more advanced so-called “couriers” using a high number of corridor routes, and “guards.” When available, these guards could be mass sympathizers (such as in a village setting) or specific teams.

It was these so-called couriers and their courier corridors that Hồ Chí Minh said were the most important element for victory because they served their cause in much the same way that blood vessels and the nervous system served the human body.

The Revolutionary Infrastructure was so widespread and efficient that it became a comprehensive shadow government with all the associated services there to support, control and expand a “shadow nation.”

The Phoenix Program was designed during the Vietnam War with the purpose of destroying the Revolutionary Infrastructure.
