= Vietnamese military ranks and insignia =

Vietnamese military ranks and insignia were specified by the National Assembly of Vietnam through the Law on Vietnam People's Army Officer (No: 6-LCT/HĐNN7) on 30 December 1981.

The Vietnam People's Army distinguishes three career paths: Officers (sĩ quan), warrant officers (Quân nhân Chuyên nghiệp), non-commissioned officers (hạ sĩ quan), and enlisted personnel (chiến sĩ).

Because the shoulder insignia of all ranks are represented by an elongated pentagonal epaulette, they are, either detailed or colour-coded to indicate rank, branch, as well as unit.

The shoulder epaulettes from those of enlisted soldiers to field officers are detailed with a silver crest with an encircled silver star. Those of generals and admirals have fully golden epaulettes with corresponding golden crests and encircled stars.

Ranks can show information about branches of military personnel.

The branch colours that form the piping of the shoulder boards are as follows:

- Army (ground forces): red
- Navy: dark blue/navy blue
- Air Force/Air defence: azure
- Border Defence: green
- Coast Guard: blue

The shoulder insignia ranks are in gold shoulder boards in the Ground Forces, Air Force and Navy.

Border Defense Force's ranks are in dark green shoulder boards with red piping. Coast Guard rank and rating insignia are in blue with gold piping.

Beginning in the 2010s, Navy officers were given gold sleeve insignia following the practice of most international navies, which are worn on the cuff in the full dress with the executive curl.

== Table of ranks ==
=== Officers ===
The following are rank insignia of commissioned officers of the People's Army. The People's Army of Vietnam is an integrated force, ranks are the same in all services, with an exception of the flag officers of the Navy. In addition the Navy has separate sleeve insignia for officers only, which are not shown - they are worn on variants of the full dress and service uniforms.

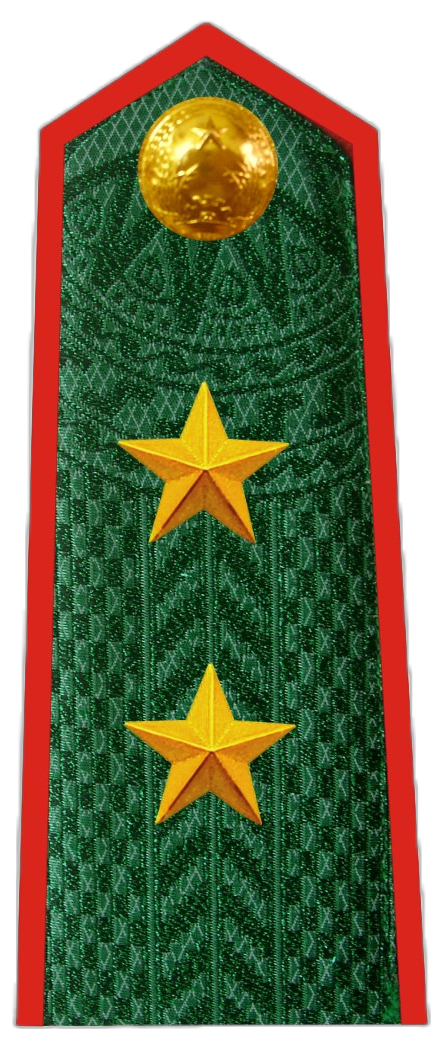
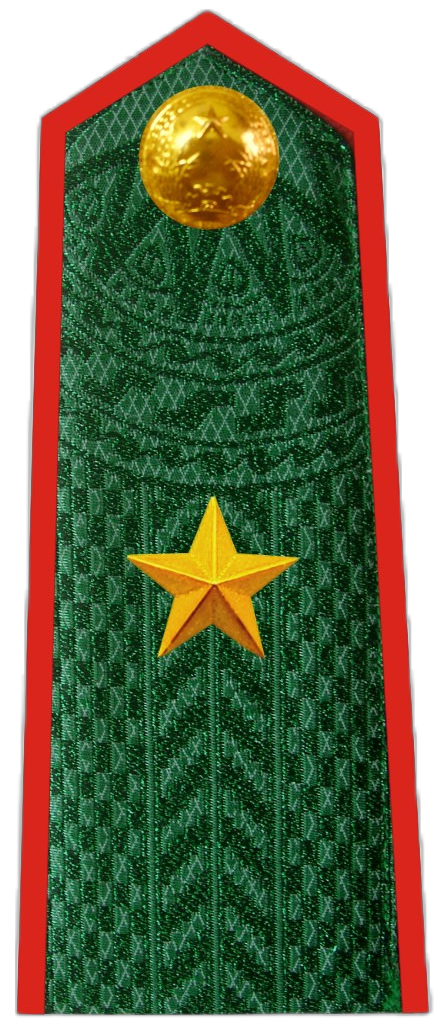
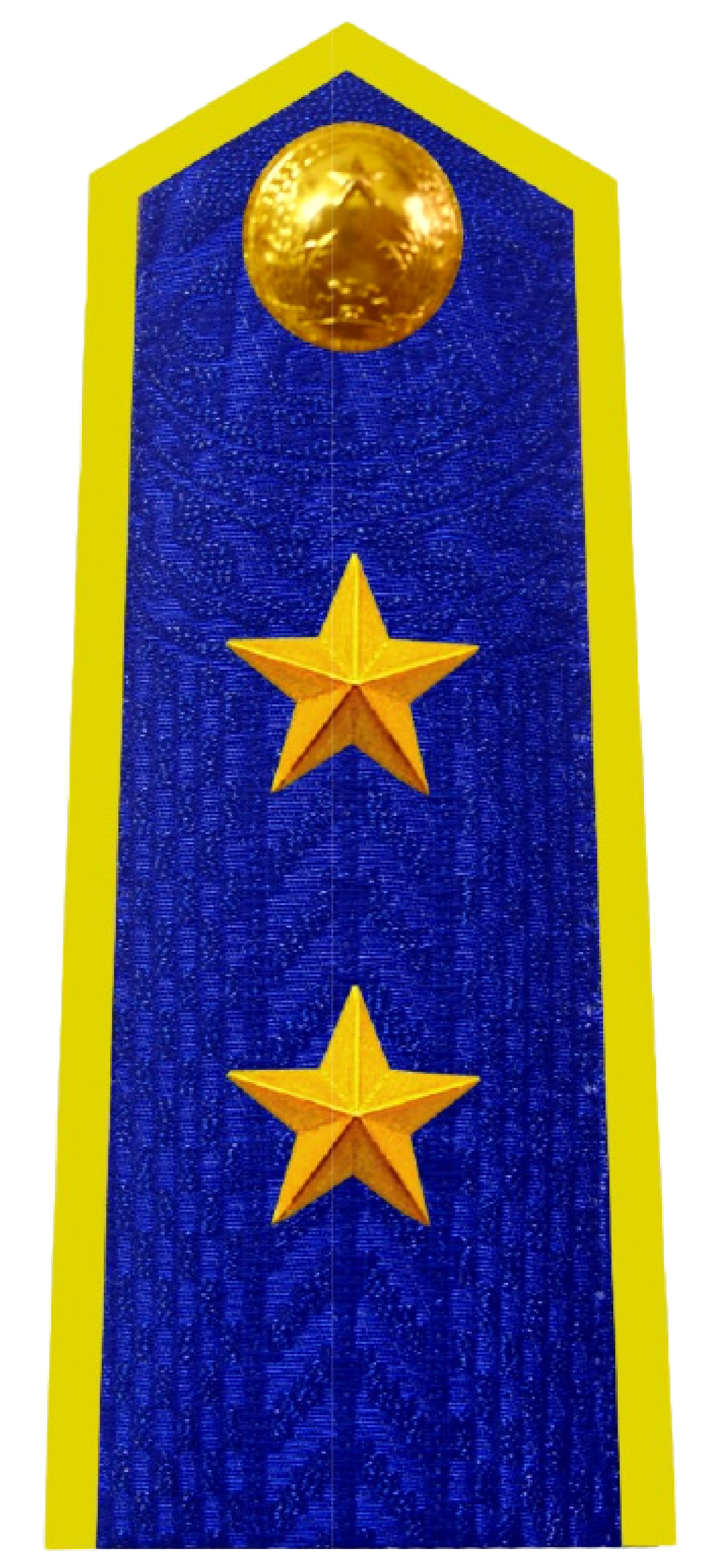
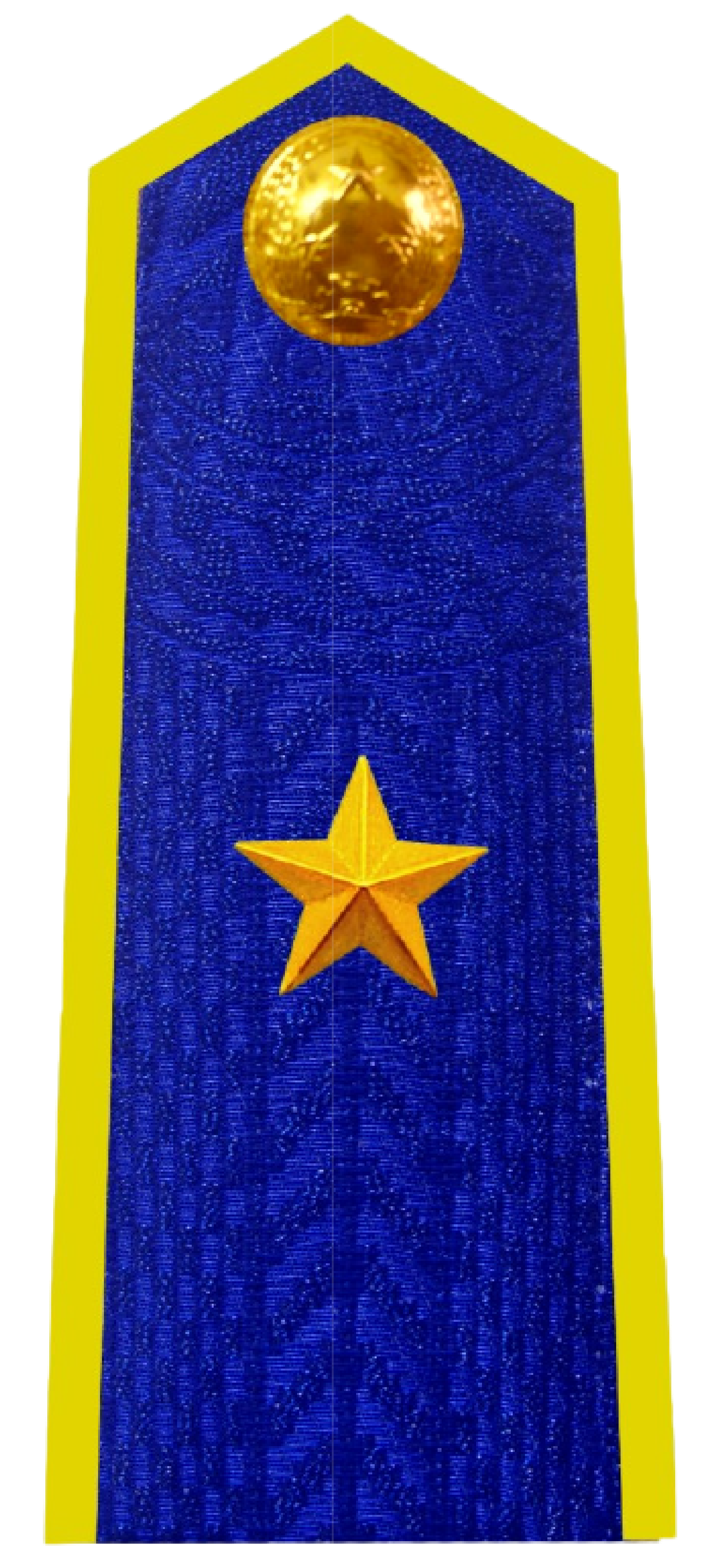
Rank group	General / flag officers				Senior officers				Junior officers
Vietnam People's Ground Force
Vietnam People's Ground Force	Đại tướng	Thượng tướng	Trung tướng	Thiếu tướng	Đại tá	Thượng tá	Trung tá	Thiếu tá	Đại úy	Thượng úy	Trung úy	Thiếu úy
Vietnam People's Navy
Vietnam People's Navy		Đô đốc	Phó đô đốc	Chuẩn đô đốc	Đại tá	Thượng tá	Trung tá	Thiếu tá	Đại úy	Thượng úy	Trung úy	Thiếu úy
Vietnam People's Air Force
Vietnam People's Air Force		Thượng tướng	Trung tướng	Thiếu tướng	Đại tá	Thượng tá	Trung tá	Thiếu tá	Đại úy	Thượng úy	Trung úy	Thiếu úy
Vietnam Border Guard
Vietnam Border Guard			Trung tướng	Thiếu tướng	Đại tá	Thượng tá	Trung tá	Thiếu tá	Đại úy	Thượng úy	Trung úy	Thiếu úy
Vietnam Coast Guard
Vietnam Coast Guard			Trung tướng	Thiếu tướng	Đại tá	Thượng tá	Trung tá	Thiếu tá	Đại úy	Thượng úy	Trung úy	Thiếu úy
Vietnam Cyberspace Operations
Vietnam Cyberspace Operations			Trung tướng	Thiếu tướng	Đại tá	Thượng tá	Trung tá	Thiếu tá	Đại úy	Thượng úy	Trung úy	Thiếu úy
President Ho Chi Minh Mausoleum Defence Force
President Ho Chi Minh Mausoleum Defence Force				Thiếu tướng	Đại tá	Thượng tá	Trung tá	Thiếu tá	Đại úy	Thượng úy	Trung úy	Thiếu úy
Rank group	General / flag officers				Senior officers				Junior officers

=== Warrant officer ===
The following are the insignia for warrant officers for the army, navy, air force, border guard and coast guard respectively. These officers are recruited to specific fields, and do not undertake the same military training as regular officers.

In addressing them, they are referred to using the rank displayed - e.g. as Major (Thiếu tá), Lieutenant (Trung úy) etc. They do not hold any command authority over regular officers.

Rank insignia used by the warrant officer corps since 2008 have a pink silk line running along the shoulder board (before 2008 it was a V-shaped chevron) to distinguish them from the regular officer corps. Naval specialist officers also have a pink border on their cuff insignia in their service dress.

Rank group	Warrant officers
Vietnam People's Ground Force
Vietnam People's Ground Force	Thượng tá Quân nhân Chuyên nghiệp	Trung tá Quân nhân Chuyên nghiệp	Thiếu tá Quân nhân Chuyên nghiệp	Đại úy Quân nhân Chuyên nghiệp	Thượng úy Quân nhân Chuyên nghiệp	Trung úy Quân nhân Chuyên nghiệp	Thiếu úy Quân nhân Chuyên nghiệp
Vietnam People's Navy
Vietnam People's Navy	Thượng tá Quân nhân Chuyên nghiệp	Trung tá Quân nhân Chuyên nghiệp	Thiếu tá Quân nhân Chuyên nghiệp	Đại úy Quân nhân Chuyên nghiệp	Thượng úy Quân nhân Chuyên nghiệp	Trung úy Quân nhân Chuyên nghiệp	Thiếu úy Quân nhân Chuyên nghiệp
Vietnam People's Air Force
Vietnam People's Air Force	Thượng tá Quân nhân Chuyên nghiệp	Trung tá Quân nhân Chuyên nghiệp	Thiếu tá Quân nhân Chuyên nghiệp	Đại úy Quân nhân Chuyên nghiệp	Thượng úy Quân nhân Chuyên nghiệp	Trung úy Quân nhân Chuyên nghiệp	Thiếu úy Quân nhân Chuyên nghiệp
Vietnam Border Guard
Vietnam Border Guard	Thượng tá Quân nhân Chuyên nghiệp	Trung tá Quân nhân Chuyên nghiệp	Thiếu tá Quân nhân Chuyên nghiệp	Đại úy Quân nhân Chuyên nghiệp	Thượng úy Quân nhân Chuyên nghiệp	Trung úy Quân nhân Chuyên nghiệp	Thiếu úy Quân nhân Chuyên nghiệp
Vietnam Coast Guard
Vietnam Coast Guard	Thượng tá Quân nhân Chuyên nghiệp	Trung tá Quân nhân Chuyên nghiệp	Thiếu tá Quân nhân Chuyên nghiệp	Đại úy Quân nhân Chuyên nghiệp	Thượng úy Quân nhân Chuyên nghiệp	Trung úy Quân nhân Chuyên nghiệp	Thiếu úy Quân nhân Chuyên nghiệp

=== Enlisted ===
The following are the rank insignia of non-commissioned officers and enlisted personnel.

Rank group	Senior NCOs		Junior NCOs	Enlisted
Vietnam People's Ground Force
Vietnam People's Ground Force	Thượng sĩ	Trung sĩ	Hạ sĩ	Binh nhất	Binh nhì
Vietnam People's Navy
Vietnam People's Navy	Thượng sĩ	Trung sĩ	Hạ sĩ	Binh nhất	Binh nhì
Navy sailor suit
Vietnam People's Air Force
Vietnam People's Air Force	Thượng sĩ	Trung sĩ	Hạ sĩ	Binh nhất	Binh nhì
Vietnam Border Guard
Vietnam Border Guard	Thượng sĩ	Trung sĩ	Hạ sĩ	Binh nhất	Binh nhì
Vietnam Coast Guard
Vietnam Coast Guard	Thượng sĩ	Trung sĩ	Hạ sĩ	Binh nhất	Binh nhì
President Ho Chi Minh Mausoleum Defence Force
President Ho Chi Minh Mausoleum Defence Force	Thượng sĩ	Trung sĩ	Hạ sĩ	Binh nhất	Binh nhì
Rank group	Senior NCOs		Junior NCOs	Enlisted

=== Cadet ===
Rank	Ground Force	Navy	Air Force	Border Guard	Coast Guard
Officer Cadet					
NCO Cadet & technical staff					

Prior to 2010, the rank of Aspirant was held by final-year students at military and security academies.

== Lapels ==
Level	Ground Forces	Air Force	Navy	Border Guard	Coast Guard	Cyberspace Operations	Mausoleum Defence
Emblem							
General Officers							
Field Grade Officers; Company Grade Officers							
NCO; Enlisted			No equivalent				

== Historical ranks ==
=== Commissioned officer ranks ===
Rank group	General / flag officers				Senior officers				Junior officers
Vietnam People's Ground Force (1946–1958)
Vietnam People's Ground Force (1946–1958)	Đại tướng		Trung tướng	Thiếu tướng	Đại tá		Trung tá	Thiếu tá	Đại úy		Trung úy	Thiếu úy
Vietnam People's Ground Force (1960–1992)
Vietnam People's Ground Force (1960–1992)	Đại tướng	Thượng tướng	Trung tướng	Thiếu tướng	Đại tá	Thượng tá	Trung tá	Thiếu tá	Đại úy	Thượng úy	Trung úy	Thiếu úy

==== Student officer ranks ====
Rank group	Student officer
1946–1958
1946–1958	Chuẩn úy
1960–1992
1960–1992	Học viên Sĩ quan

=== Other ranks ===
Rank group	Senior NCOs		Junior NCOs	Enlisted
Vietnam People's Ground Force (1946–1958)
Vietnam People's Ground Force (1946–1958)	Thượng sĩ	Trung sĩ	Hạ sĩ	Binh nhất	Binh nhì
Vietnam People's Ground Force (1960–1992)
Vietnam People's Ground Force (1960–1992)	Thượng sĩ	Trung sĩ	Hạ sĩ	Binh nhất	Binh nhì

== See also ==
- History of Vietnamese military ranks
- South Vietnamese military ranks and insignia
