= South Vietnamese military ranks and insignia =

South Vietnamese military ranks and insignia was used by the Republic of Vietnam Military Forces, specifically the Army, Navy, Marines and Air Force. Originally based on French ranks, the ranks were changed in 1967 to resemble US ranks more closely.

== Commissioned officer ranks ==
The rank insignia of commissioned officers.

| Rank group | General / flag officers | | | | | Senior officers | | | Junior officers |
|---|---|---|---|---|---|---|---|---|---|---|---|
| Army of the Republic of Vietnam (1955-1963) |
| Army of the Republic of Vietnam (1955-1963) | | Đại tướng | Trung tướng | Thiếu tướng | Chuẩn tướng | Đại tá | Trung tá | Thiếu tá | Đại úy | Trung úy | Thiếu úy |
| Army of the Republic of Vietnam (1964-1975) |
| Army of the Republic of Vietnam (1964-1975) | Thống tướng | Đại tướng | Trung tướng | Thiếu tướng | Chuẩn tướng | Đại tá | Trung tá | Thiếu tá | Đại úy | Trung úy | Thiếu úy |
| Republic of Vietnam Navy (1955-1963) |
| Republic of Vietnam Navy (1955-1963) | | Đô đốc | Phó đô đốc | Đề đốc | Phó đề đốc | Đại tá | Trung tá | Thiếu tá | Đại úy | Trung úy | Thiếu úy |
| Republic of Vietnam Navy (1964-1975) |
| Republic of Vietnam Navy (1964-1975) | Thủy sư Đô đốc | Đô đốc | Phó đô đốc | Đề đốc | Phó đề đốc | Đại tá | Trung tá | Thiếu tá | Đại úy | Trung úy | Thiếu úy |
| Republic of Vietnam Marine Division (1955-1963) |
| Republic of Vietnam Marine Division (1955-1963) | | | | Thiếu tướng | Chuẩn tướng | Đại tá | Trung tá | Thiếu tá | Đại úy | Trung úy | Thiếu úy |
| Republic of Vietnam Marine Division (1964-1975) |
| Republic of Vietnam Marine Division (1964-1975) | | | Trung tướng | Thiếu tướng | Chuẩn tướng | Đại tá | Trung tá | Thiếu tá | Đại úy | Trung úy | Thiếu úy |
| Republic of Vietnam Air Force (1955-1963) |
| Republic of Vietnam Air Force (1955-1963) | | | Trung tướng | Thiếu tướng | Chuẩn tướng | Đại tá | Trung tá | Thiếu tá | Đại úy | Trung úy | Thiếu úy |
| Republic of Vietnam Air Force (1964-1975) |
| Republic of Vietnam Air Force (1964-1975) | Thống tướng | Đại tướng | Trung tướng | Thiếu tướng | Chuẩn tướng | Đại tá | Trung tá | Thiếu tá | Đại úy | Trung úy | Thiếu úy |
| Rank group | General / flag officers | | | | | Senior officers | | | Junior officers |

=== Student officer ranks ===
| Rank group | Student officer |
|---|---|---|
| Army of the Republic of Vietnam (1955-1963) |
| Army of the Republic of Vietnam (1964-1975) |
| Republic of Vietnam Navy (1955-1963) |
| Republic of Vietnam Navy (1964-1975) |
| Republic of Vietnam Marine Division (1955-1975) |
| Republic of Vietnam Air Force (1955-1963) |
| Republic of Vietnam Air Force (1964-1975) |
| Name | Chuẩn úy | Sinh viên sĩ quan |

== Other ranks ==
The rank insignia of non-commissioned officers and enlisted personnel.

| Rank group | Senior NCOs | | | | Junior NCOs | | Enlisted |
|---|---|---|---|---|---|---|---|---|
| Army of the Republic of Vietnam (1954-1967) | | | | | | | | No insignia |
| Army of the Republic of Vietnam (1954-1967) | Thượng sĩ nhất | Thượng sĩ | Trung sĩ nhất | Trung sĩ | Hạ sĩ nhất | Hạ sĩ | Binh nhất | Binh nhì |
| Army of the Republic of Vietnam (1967-1975) | | | | | | | | No insignia |
| Army of the Republic of Vietnam (1967-1975) | Thượng sĩ nhất | Thượng sĩ | Trung sĩ nhất | Trung sĩ | Hạ sĩ nhất | Hạ sĩ | Binh nhất | Binh nhì |
| Republic of Vietnam Navy (1954–1967) | | | | | | | | No insignia |
| Republic of Vietnam Navy (1954–1967) | Thượng sĩ nhất | Thượng sĩ | Trung sĩ nhất | Trung sĩ | Hạ sĩ nhất | Hạ sĩ | Binh nhất | Binh nhì |
| Republic of Vietnam Navy (1967–1975) | | | | | | | | No insignia |
| Republic of Vietnam Navy (1967–1975) | Thượng sĩ nhất | Thượng sĩ | Trung sĩ nhất | Trung sĩ | Hạ sĩ nhất | Hạ sĩ | Binh nhất | Binh nhì |
| Republic of Vietnam Marine Division (1954-1967) | | | | | | | | No insignia |
| Republic of Vietnam Marine Division (1954-1967) | Thượng sĩ nhất | Thượng sĩ | Trung sĩ nhất | Trung sĩ | Hạ sĩ nhất | Hạ sĩ | Binh nhất | Binh nhì |
| Republic of Vietnam Marine Division (1967-1975) | | | | | | | | No insignia |
| Republic of Vietnam Marine Division (1967-1975) | Thượng sĩ nhất | Thượng sĩ | Trung sĩ nhất | Trung sĩ | Hạ sĩ nhất | Hạ sĩ | Binh nhất | Binh nhì |
| Republic of Vietnam Air Force (1954-1967) |
| Republic of Vietnam Air Force (1954-1967) | Thượng sĩ nhất | Thượng sĩ | Trung sĩ nhất | Trung sĩ | Hạ sĩ nhất | Hạ sĩ | Binh nhất | Binh nhì |
| Republic of Vietnam Air Force (1967-1975) |
| Republic of Vietnam Air Force (1967-1975) | Thượng sĩ nhất | Thượng sĩ | Trung sĩ nhất | Trung sĩ | Hạ sĩ nhất | Hạ sĩ | Binh nhất | Binh nhì |
| Rank group | Senior NCOs | | | | Junior NCOs | | Enlisted |

== See also ==
- Vietnamese military ranks and insignia
