= Huan Nguyen =

Engineer and former US Navy admiral (born 1950s)

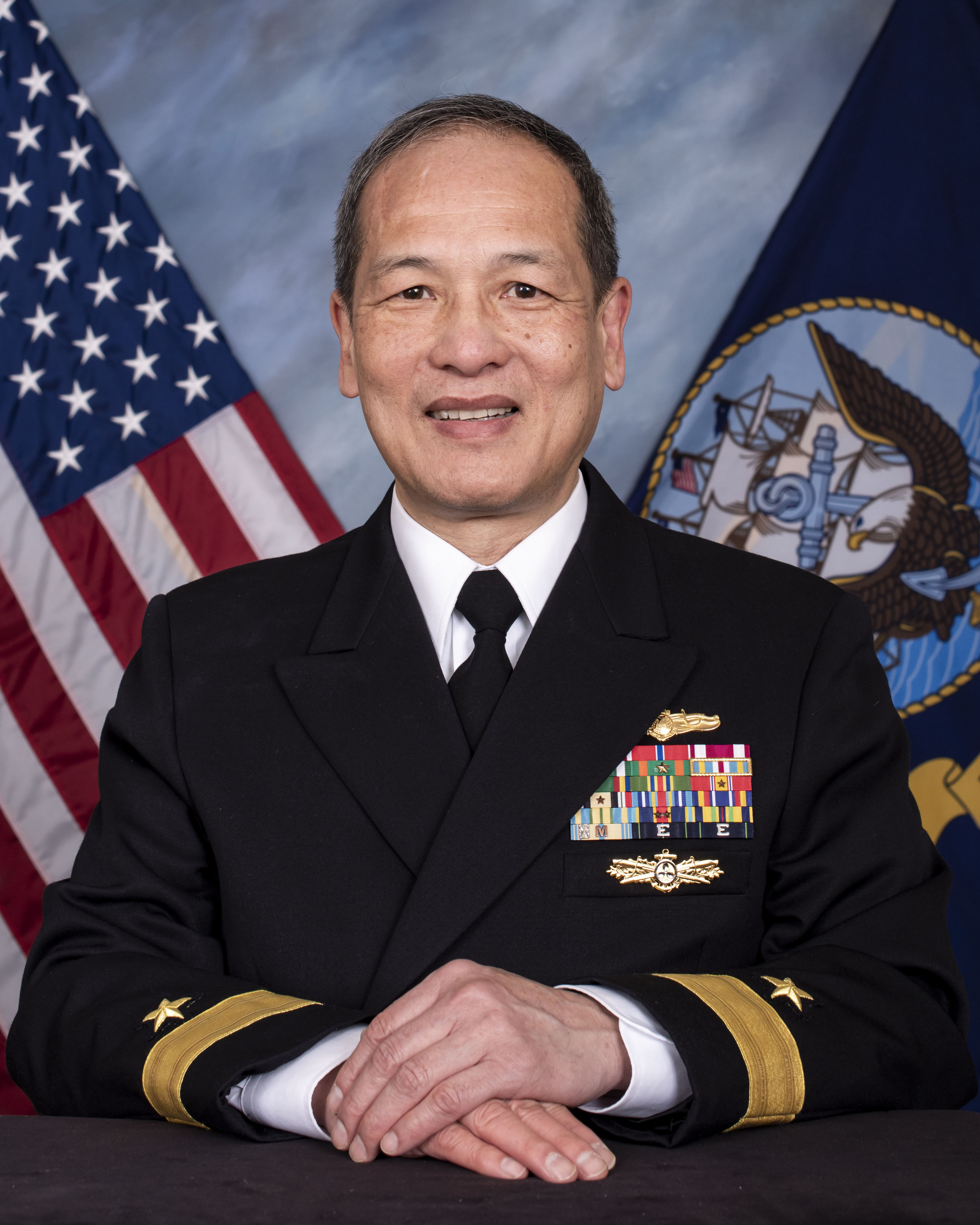
- Rear Admiral Nguyen (before Nov 2020)
- Born: Nguyễn Từ Huấn; 1958 or 1959 (age 67–68); Huế, South Vietnam
- Education: BS, Oklahoma State U (1981); MEng, Southern Methodist U; MEng, Purdue University; M.Sc.IT, Carnegie Mellon U
- Occupations: Engineer; Naval officer
- Employers: General Motors (1994); Bank of America (2006); Exelis Inc. (2009)
- Spouse: Nguyễn Kim Hương
- Children: 3
- Awards: Melvin R. Lohmann Medal
- Military career
- Allegiance: United States
- Branch: United States Navy
- Years: 1993–2022 (29 years)
- Rank: Rear admiral
- Unit: Naval Sea Systems Command
- Awards: Legion of Merit × 3

Huan Tu Nguyen (Vietnamese: Nguyễn Từ Huấn, born 1958 or 1959) is a Vietnamese-American engineer and retired rear admiral in the United States Navy.

== Personal life ==
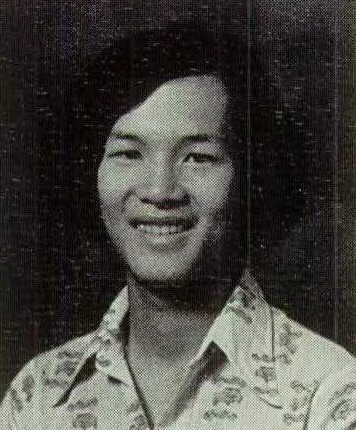
Nguyen in 1977

The son of Lieutenant Colonel Nguyễn Tuấn, Huan Nguyen was born in 1958 or 1959 in Huế, South Vietnam, During the Tet Offensive of 1968, Nguyen's parents and six siblings were killed at their Saigon-area home by alleged Vietcong guerrillas. Shot in the arm, thigh, and skull, nine-year-old Nguyen stayed in the house for two hours—while his mother bled to death—and then escaped after dark. News sources from the 2020s reported that one of the men who attacked Nguyen's family was Vietcong officer Nguyễn Văn Lém, whose execution by Nguyễn Ngọc Loan was famously photographed by Eddie Adams. In 2018, Max Hastings reported that historian Ed Moise regarded the attribution of the Nguyễn Tuấn family murders to Nguyễn Văn Lém as a postwar South Vietnamese propaganda fabrication. Moise did not dispute that Viet Cong forces murdered the family. There is substantial support that Lém was an active VC participant in Tet; the specific massacre allegation remains a separate, disputed claim. Hastings described Lém’s responsibility as unresolved, writing that “the truth will never be known. (Note: It is only the identification of Lem as the murderer, not the story of the murder itself, that Moise considers a postwar fabrication.)

Thereafter, Nguyen lived with his uncle, a colonel in the South Vietnam Air Force, until 1975, when they fled to the United States after the Fall of Saigon. Nguyen and his uncle's family first moved to Midwest City, Oklahoma, near Tinker Air Force Base. While his uncle was an auto mechanic for Volkswagen, Nguyen worked at Shotgun Sam's Pizza Palace for an hourly rate of US$2 (equivalent to $11.97 in 2025).

== Education ==
Nguyen was one of 560 graduates from Midwest City High School in 1977, where he was a member of the school's French club, Mathematics, Engineering, Science Achievement program, National Honor Society, and photo club.

In 1981, he graduated from Oklahoma State University (OSU) with a Bachelor of Science in electrical engineering. As of October 2019, he also held three master's degrees: electrical engineering from Southern Methodist University, engineering (manufacturing concentration) from Purdue University, and information technology (with highest distinction) from Carnegie Mellon University. In 2020, Nguyen was inducted into OSU's College of Engineering, Architecture and Technology Hall of Fame and received the school's highest honor, the Melvin R. Lohmann Medal.

== Career ==
=== US Navy ===
Nguyen was inspired to join the United States Navy after witnessing the sailors and Marines who cared for his family en route to the US in 1975. In 1993, he was commissioned through the Reserve Engineering Duty Officer program.

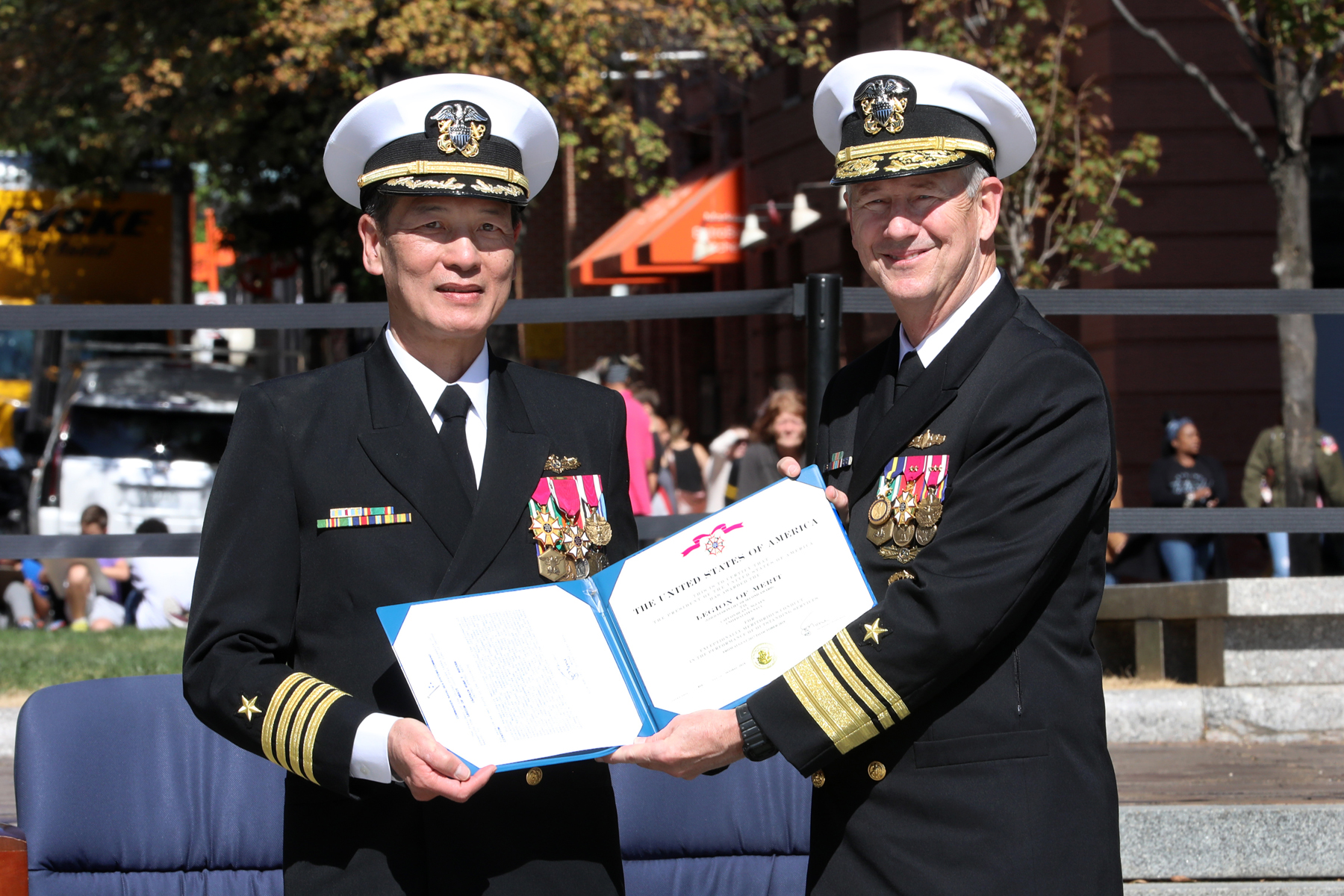
Nguyen and Thomas Moore (2019)

Since then, he has been assigned to United States Fleet Activities Yokosuka where he was test officer and officer-in-charge of Detachment 113 at the Ship Repair Facility in Yokosuka. Nguyen served as executive officer and chief engineer for Joint Counter Radio-Controlled Improvised Explosive Device Electronic Warfare (CREW), field office in Camp Victory, supporting Multi-National Corps – Iraq, where he was instrumental in the stand-up of Joint CREW Composite Squadron One at the Fleet Electronic Warfare Center. With Task Force Paladin and the Combined Explosive and Exploitation Cell, Nguyen supported Combined Forces Command-Afghanistan as CREW engineer. He also had assignments within the Naval Sea Systems Command, United States Pacific Fleet, and the Office of Naval Research. At the United States Navy Memorial in Washington, D.C., on 10 October 2019, Nguyen became the first Vietnamese-American promoted to rear admiral. Upon his promotion, he was assigned to Naval Sea Systems Command at the Washington Navy Yard as Deputy Commander for Cyber Engineering.

Nguyen retired from the Navy on 7 October 2022, with a retirement ceremony held at the Washington Navy Yard. During his career he was awarded the Legion of Merit three times, a Bronze Star Medal, a Meritorious Service Medal, two Navy and Marine Corps Commendation Medals, and two Navy and Marine Corps Achievement Medals among various other individual, and unit campaign and service awards.

After retirement he became the senior advisor to Naval Sea Systems Command, providing support on cybersecurity and digital transformation. In August 2023, the National Bureau of Asian Research announced that Nguyen will join its board of directors.

=== Civilian engineering ===
In August 1994, Nguyen began working for General Motors (GM) where he managed the team that designed and integrated the powertrain control module for all of GM's platforms. In 2006, he became the senior vice president of Bank of America and established computer security standards and processes. After joining Exelis Inc. in 2009, Nguyen "managed a multi-million-dollar portfolio of independent research and development projects on ground electronic warfare countermeasures, counter-remote improvised explosive device systems and interference mitigation systems."
