= People's Army of Vietnam =

Combined military forces of Vietnam

Vietnam People's Army
- Quân đội nhân dân Việt Nam
- Emblem

- "Determined to win" military flag
- Motto: Quân đội ta trung với Đảng, hiếu với dân, sẵn sàng chiến đấu hy sinh vì độc lập, tự do của Tổ quốc, vì chủ nghĩa xã hội. Nhiệm vụ nào cũng hoàn thành, khó khăn nào cũng vượt qua, kẻ thù nào cũng đánh thắng ("Our army is loyal to the Party, devoted to the people, and ready to fight and sacrifice for the independence and freedom of the Fatherland, and for socialism. Will complete any task, overcome any difficulty, and defeat any enemy.")
- Founded: 22 December 1944; 81 years ago
- Current form: 7 July 1976; 50 years ago (formal unification of the NVA and the LASV)
- Service branches: Combined Arms (de facto ground force; not a formally separated service branch); Naval Service; Air Defence - Air Force Service; Border Guard Command; Coast Guard Command (structurally under de jure administration of the Vietnamese Government); Artillery - Missile Command; Cyberspace Operations Command; HCM Mausoleum Protection Command
- Headquarters: Ministry of National Defence, Number 7 Nguyễn Tri Phương road, Điện Biên Ba Đình, Hà Nội
- Website: Official website

Leadership
- CMC Secretary, Commander-in-Chief and NDSC Chairman: Party General Secretary and State President Tô Lâm
- Head of Government and NDSC Vice Chairman: Prime Minister Lê Minh Hưng
- CMC Deputy Secretary and Defence Minister: General Phan Văn Giang

- Deputy Defence Minister and Chief of the General Staff: General Nguyễn Tân Cương

- Director of the General Department of Political Affairs: General Nguyễn Trọng Nghĩa

Personnel
- Military age: 18–25 years old (18–27 for those who attend colleges or universities)
- Active personnel: 450,000 (ranked 7th)
- Reserve personnel: 5,000,000

Expenditure
- Budget: 273 trillion dong = US$ 10.4 billion (2025)
- Percent of GDP: ~1.6% (2023; projected)

Industry
- Domestic suppliers: Viettel; Z111 Factory; Z113 Factory; Z153 Factory; Shipbuilding Industry Corporation; Hong Ha Shipbuilding Company (Z173 Factory); Z176 Factory; Z189 Shipyard; Ba Son Corporation; Song Thu Shipyard; Vietnam Helicopter Corporation; Vietnam Aerospace Association (VASA); A32 Factory
- Foreign suppliers: Historical: Czechoslovakia; East Germany; North Korea; Hungarian People's Republic; Romania; USSR; Modern: Australia; Belgium; Belarus; Brazil; Bulgaria; Canada; Cuba; Czech Republic; China; France; Germany; India; Indonesia; Israel; Italy; Japan; Montenegro; Netherlands; Poland; Russia; Singapore; South Korea; Switzerland; South Africa; Taiwan; Turkey; Ukraine; United Kingdom; United States

Related articles
- History: Military history of Vietnam List of engagements: World War II (Anti-Japanese Campaign 1944–1945); First Indochina War (against France, 1946–1954); Second Indochina War (Vietnam War) (against the United States and South Vietnamese forces, 1954–1975); Cambodian–Vietnamese War (against the Khmer Rouge, 1977–1989); Sino-Vietnamese War (against China, 1979); Sino-Vietnamese border conflicts (border clashes with China, 1979–1990); Vietnamese border raids in Thailand (against the Khmer Rouge insurgents and Thailand, 1979–1989); Thai–Laotian Border War (against Thailand to defend its ally, Laos, 1987–1988); Clashes in Cambodia (against the co-premier Norodom Ranariddh and the Khmer Rouge, 1997); Insurgency in Laos (secret war in Laos against Hmong separatists, 1975–2022); War against rebellions 1975–1992 (against FULRO and several insurgent groups); United Nations peacekeeping mission in Central African Republic (since 2015); United Nations Mission in South Sudan (since 2015)
- Ranks: Military ranks of Vietnam

The People's Army of Vietnam (PAVN; Quân đội nhân dân Việt Nam) (Note: officially the Vietnam People's Army (VPA; Vietnamese: Quân đội nhân dân Việt Nam, pronounced [kwʌ̄n ɗôˀj ɲʌ̄n zʌn viə̂tˀ nām]), or the Vietnamese Army (Vietnamese: Quân đội Việt Nam), the People's Army (Vietnamese: Quân đội Nhân dân) or colloquially Bộ đội (Vietnamese pronunciation: [ɓôˀ ɗôˀj], lit. 'the Troops')) is the national military force of the Socialist Republic of Vietnam and the armed wing of the ruling Communist Party of Vietnam (CPV). PAVN is the core component of the Vietnam People's Armed Forces and includes: Ground Force, Navy, Air Defence - Air Force, Border Guard and Coast Guard. Vietnam has not organized a formally-separated and structured ground force or army service command; instead, all ground troops, army corps, military districts and special forces are designated under the umbrella term "combined arms" (Vietnamese: binh chủng hợp thành) and directly administered by the Ministry of National Defence, under the command of the CPV Central Military Commission, the Minister of National Defence, and the General Staff of the Vietnam People's Army.

During the French Indochina War (1946–1954), the PAVN was often referred to as the Việt Minh, or precisely as the coalition's armed wing. In the context of the Vietnam War (1955–1975), despite already using PAVN as its official designation, the army was referred to by its opposition forces as the North Vietnamese Army (NVA; Quân đội Bắc Việt), serving as the mainline military force of the Democratic Republic of Vietnam. This allowed writers, the U.S. military, and the general public, to distinguish northern communists from the southern communists, known as the Viet Cong (VC) and was formally established as the National Liberation Front (NLF). However, both groups ultimately worked under the same command structure, despite Viet Cong (VC/NLF) - also proclaimed the Provisional Revolutionary Government (PRG) - having its own nominal military forces being the Liberation Army of South Vietnam (LASV), which was implicitly and practically considered a component and proxy of the PAVN by the North Vietnamese. In 1976, following the political reunification of Vietnam that institutionally unified the two governments of the Democratic Republic of Vietnam (North) and the Republic of South Vietnam (PRG), LASV was officially disbanded and merged into the so-called NVA to form the existing incarnation of PAVN, serving as the national military of the unified state of the Socialist Republic of Vietnam.

== Etymology and symbols ==
=== Etymology ===
After multiple reorganisations during the final days of World War II and subsequently First Indochina War, Viet Minh's primary armed wing was formally named Quân đội nhân dân Việt Nam (lit. 'Military of the people of Vietnam') by President Ho Chi Minh and his administration in 1954, and since then, the name has become the sole official designation for the mainline military forces under the governments of the former Democratic Republic of Vietnam and the contemporary Socialist Republic of Vietnam. It is usually translated into English as the People's Army of Vietnam (PAVN), however, there are more recent consensus and standardisation by official Vietnamese narratives to use Vietnam People's Army (VPA) as the uniformed English designation. The name shares the common "People" theming with many communist forces, and according to President Ho, this naming is to emphasise the military's morality of being "from the People, fight for the People, and serve the People."

The usage of the word "Army" in English translations has caused confusion by making people mistakenly identifying the Vietnam People's Army to be the land service branch of the combined Vietnam People's Armed Forces, just like how the United States Army is the principal land service of the United States Armed Forces. While VPA itself is already the entired combined military force and is indeed a part of the People's Armed Forces, in Vietnam, the Armed Forces is the umbrella designation to call the national uniformed services that consist of the military (VPA), the police (PPS), and the militia. In other words, Vietnam's "Army" is equivalent to most of the nations' "Armed Forces" or "Defence Forces", and in practice being similar to "Armies" such as the Soviet's Red Army, the Islamic Republic of Iran Army, the People's Liberation Army of China, and to some extent, the Army of the Czech Republic. VPA's land warfare arms have not been organised under an actual "Ground Force" (Lục quân) service branch, which would be comparable to many countries' "Army" or land force component.

=== Symbols and identification ===
According to codified regulations from the Government of Vietnam, the VPA emblem (Quân hiệu, lit. 'Military emblem') is "circular, with a shaded golden star in the middle, surrounded by two golden rice ears on a bright red background; below the two rice ears is a half golden cogwheel, with a golden outer rim" and will be employed by all VPA service branches and components, except Vietnam Coast Guard using slightly modified variants. There are different variants for different levels of usage from combat uniform to service dress and full ceremonial, as well as versions for general officers, with all of them respecting the cited symbolism.

The VPA flag (Quân kỳ, lit. 'Military flag') is the "red banner with golden star" national flag of Vietnam defaced with the motto Quyết thắng (Determination to win) added in yellow at the canton (the top corner by the flagpole), having the unit's formal name or designation to be inscribed below the golden star in ceremonial occasions. Vietnam does not issue any distinctive unit colours, formation patches or shoulder sleeve insignia besides the units' inscribed military flags, shoulder patches indicating the service branches, as well as physical collar tabs indicating the service branches, combat arms and ranking.

Most VPA armoured vehicles are decorated with "roundels", to be a red circular field with a central yellow five-pointed star, bordered by a thick yellow ring. Meanwhile, most military aircraft are also designated with the similar roundels, however added with a pair of yellow-bordered red wing devices.

== History ==
=== Before 1945 ===
The first historical record of Vietnamese military history dates back to the era of Hồng Bàng, the first recorded state in ancient Vietnam to have assembled military force. Since then, military plays a crucial role in developing Vietnamese history due to its turbulent history of wars against China, Champa, Cambodia, Laos and Thailand.

The Southern expansion of Vietnam resulted in the destruction of Champa as an independent nation to a level that it did not exist anymore; total destruction of Luang Prabang; the decline of Cambodia which resulted in Vietnam's annexation of the Mekong Delta and wars against Siam. In most of its history, the Royal Vietnamese Armed Forces was often regarded to be one of the most professional, battle-hardened and heavily trained armies in Southeast Asia as well as Asia in a large extent.

=== Establishment ===
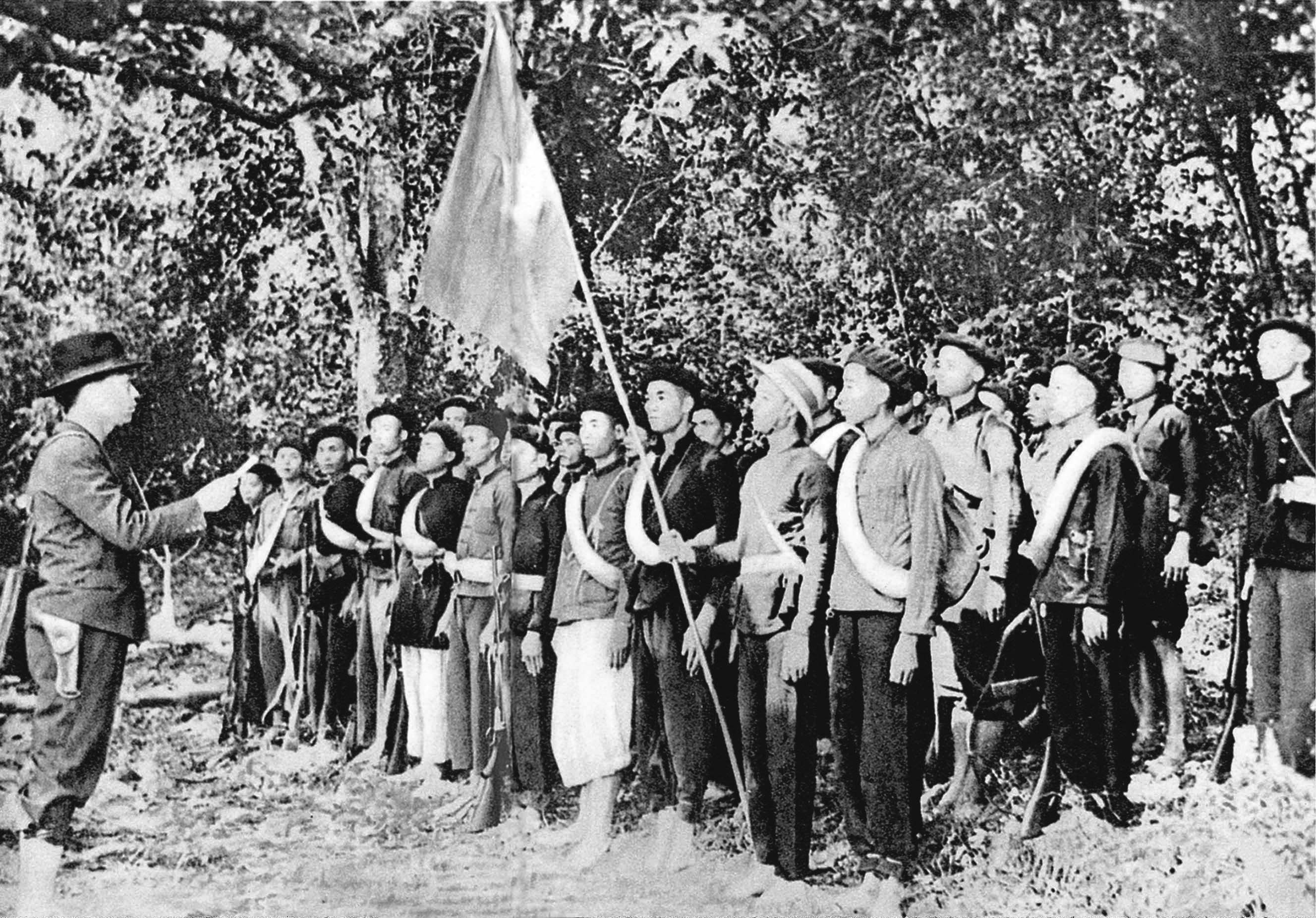
General Võ Nguyên Giáp on the date of the PAVN's establishment in 1944. Chief of General Staff Hoàng Văn Thái wearing a pith helmet and holding the flag.

The PAVN was first conceived in September 1944 at the first Revolutionary Party Military Conference as the Information, Communication and Education Unit of the Liberation Army (alternatively translated as the Vietnam Information, Communication and Education Liberation Army, Việt Nam Tuyên truyền Giải phóng Quân) to educate, recruit and mobilise the Vietnamese to create a main force to drive the French colonial and Japanese occupiers from Vietnam. Under the guidelines of Hồ Chí Minh, Võ Nguyên Giáp was given the task of establishing the brigades and the Propaganda Unit of the Liberation Army came into existence on 22 December 1944. The first formation was made up of thirty-one men and three women, armed with two revolvers, seventeen rifles, one light machine gun, and fourteen breech-loading flintlocks. It fought the PAVN's first ever engagement at the Battles of Khai Phat and Na Ngan against French soldiers in late 1944. The United States' OSS agents, led by Archimedes Patti – who was sometimes referred as the first instructor of the PAVN due to his role - had provided ammunitions as well as logistic intelligence and equipment. They also helped train these soldiers, who formed the backbone of the Vietnamese military to successfully fight the Japanese and other opponents. For instance, the PAVN's July 19, 1945 attack at Tam Dao internment camp in Tonkin saw 500 soldiers kill fifty Japanese soldiers and officials, freeing French civilian captives and escorting them to the Chinese border. The PAVN also fought the Japanese 21st Division in Thai Nguyen that year, and regularly raided rice storehouses to alleviate an ongoing famine.

There was another separate communist army called the National Salvation Army (Cứu quốc quân) which was founded and commanded by Chu Văn Tấn on 23 February 1941.

The Propaganda Liberation Army merged with the National Salvation Army into the Vietnam Liberation Army (Việt Nam Giải phóng Quân) on 15 May 1945. The Democratic Republic of Vietnam was proclaimed in Hanoi by Ho Chi Minh and Vietminh on 2 September 1945. Then in September, the army was renamed the Vietnam National Defence Force (Việt Nam Vệ quốc Đoàn). At this point, it had about 1,000 soldiers. On 22 May 1946, the army was called the National Army of Vietnam (Quân đội Quốc gia Việt Nam, not to be confused with the opposite Vietnamese National Army of the France-associated State of Vietnam which had a synonymous English name and exactly the same Vietnamese name). Lastly, in 1950, it officially became the People's Army of Vietnam (or Vietnam People's Army, Quân đội Nhân dân Việt Nam).

Võ Nguyên Giáp went on to become the first full general of the PAVN on 28 May 1948, and famous for leading the PAVN in victory over French forces at the Battle of Dien Bien Phu in 1954 and being in overall command against U.S. backed South Vietnam at the Fall of Saigon on 30 April 1975.

=== French Indochina War ===
On 7 January 1947, its first regiment, the 102nd 'Capital' Regiment, was created for operations around Hanoi. Over the next two years, the first division, the 308th Division, later well known as the Pioneer Division, was formed from the 88th Tu Vu Regiment and the 102nd Capital Regiment. By late 1950 the 308th Division had a full three infantry regiments, when it was supplemented by the 36th Regiment. At that time, the 308th Division was also backed by the 11th Battalion that later became the main force of the 312th Division. In late 1951, after launching three campaigns against three French strongpoints in the Red River Delta, the PAVN refocused on building up its ground forces further, with five new divisions, each of 10–15,000 men, created: the 304th Glory Division at Thanh Hóa, the 312th Victory Division in Vinh Phuc, the 316th Bong Lau Division in the northwest border region, the 320th Delta Division in the north Red River Delta, the 325th Binh Tri Thien Division in Binh Tri Thien province. Also in 1951, the first artillery Division, the 351st Division was formed, and later, before Battle of Dien Bien Phu in 1954, for the first time in history, it was equipped with 24 captured 105mm US howitzers supplied by the Chinese People's Liberation Army. The first six divisions (308th, 304th, 312th, 316th, 320th, 325th) became known as the original PAVN 'Steel and Iron' divisions. In 1954, four of these divisions (the 308th, 304th, 312th, 316th, supported by the 351st Division's captured US howitzers) defeated the French Union forces at the Battle of Dien Bien Phu, ending 83 years of French rule in Indochina.

The French Foreign Legion had been deployed to combat the Vietnamese insurgency during the First Indochina War. However, some of the legionnaires, such as Stefan Kubiak, deserted after witnessing torture of Vietnamese peasants at the hands of French troops and began fighting for the Việt Minh, volunteering to join the PAVN.

=== Vietnam War ===
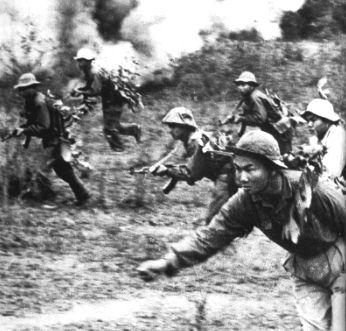
North Vietnamese troops in Vietnam War, 1967

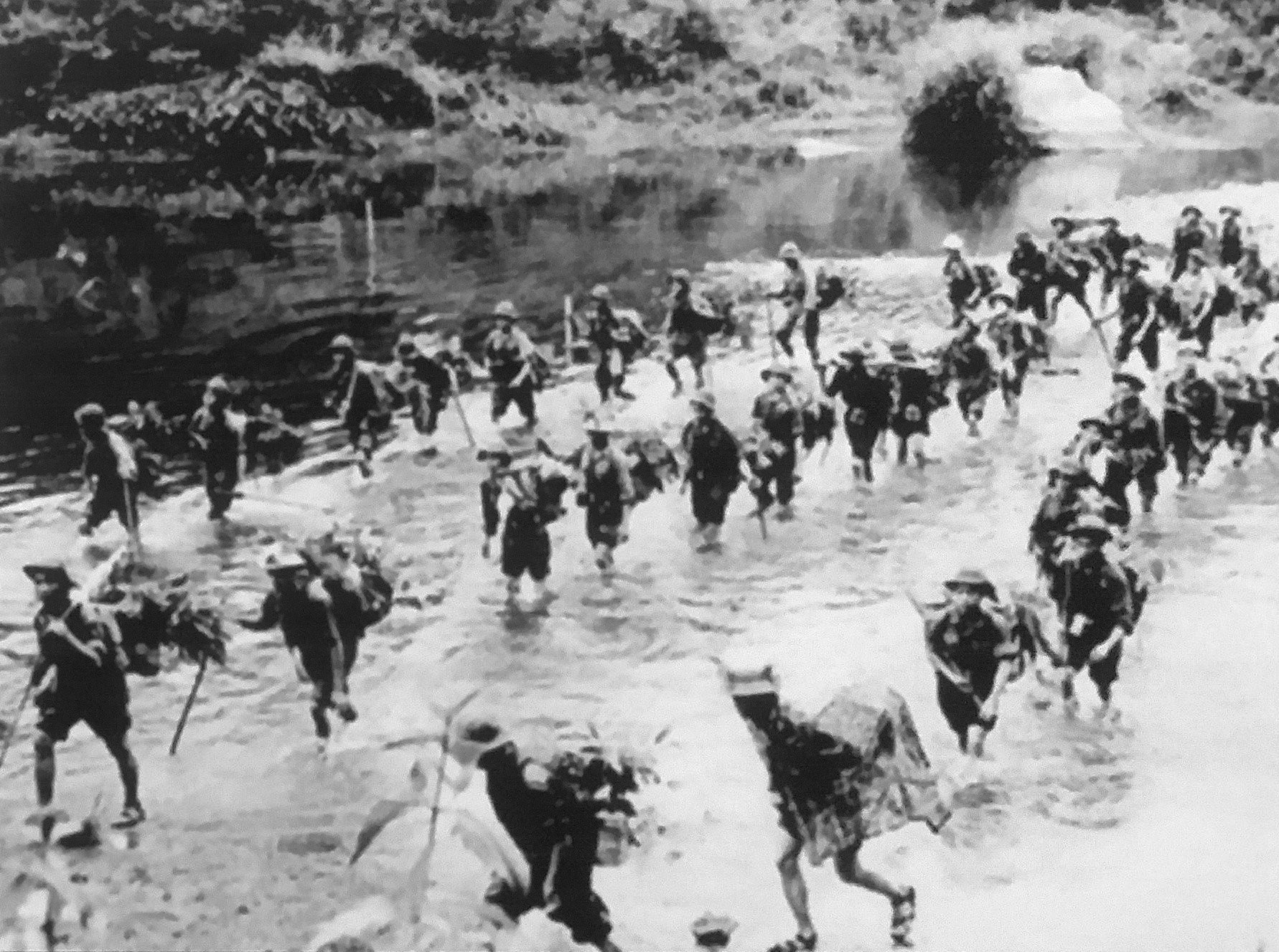
Infiltrators on the move in Laos down the Ho Chi Minh trail.

Soon after the 1954 Geneva Accords, the 330th and 338th Divisions were formed by southern Viet Minh members who had moved north in conformity with that agreement, and by 1955, six more divisions were formed: the 328th, 332nd and 350th in the north of the North Vietnam, the 305th and the 324th near the DMZ, and the 335 Division of soldiers repatriated from Laos. In 1957, the theatres of the war with the French were reorganised as the first five military regions, and in the next two years, several divisions were reduced to brigade size to meet the manpower requirements of collective farms.

By 1958, it was becoming increasingly clear that the South Vietnamese government was solidifying its position as an independent republic under Ngô Đình Diệm, who staunchly opposed the terms of the Geneva Accords, which required a national referendum on unification of north and south Vietnam under a single national government. North Vietnam prepared to settle the issue of unification by force.

In May 1959, the first major steps to prepare infiltration routes into South Vietnam were taken; Group 559 was established, a logistical unit charged with establishing routes into the south via Laos and Cambodia, which later became famous as the Ho Chi Minh trail. At about the same time, Group 579 was created as its maritime counterpart to transport supplies into the South by sea. Most of the early infiltrators were members of the 338th Division, former southerners who had been settled at Xuan Mai from 1954 onwards.

Regular formations were sent to South Vietnam from 1965 onwards; the 325th Division's 101B Regiment and the 66th Regiment of the 304th Division met U.S. forces on a large scale, a first for the PAVN, at the Battle of Ia Drang in November 1965. The 308th Division's 88A Regiment, the 312th Division's 141A, 141B, 165A, 209A, the 316th Division's 174A, the 325th Division's 95A, 95B, the 320A Division also faced the U.S. forces which included the 1st Cavalry Division, the 101st Airborne Division, the 173rd Airborne Brigade, the 4th Infantry Division, the 1st Infantry Division and the 25th Infantry Division. Many of those formations later became main forces of the 3rd Division (Yellow Star Division) in Binh Dinh (1965), the 5th Division (1966) of 7th Military Zone (Capital Tactical Area of ARVN), the 7th (created by 141st and 209th Regiments originated in the 312th Division in 1966) and 9th Divisions (first Division of National Liberation Front of Vietnam in 1965 in Mekong Delta), the 10th Dakto Division in Dakto – Central Highlands in 1972.

On 20 December 1960, anti-government forces in South Vietnam joined to form a united front called National Liberation Front of South Vietnam (Mặt trận Dân tộc Giải phóng Miền Nam Việt Nam) or simply known as the Vietcong in the United States. On 15 December 1961, the NLF established its own military called Liberation Army of South Vietnam (LASV) to fight against the American supported Army of the Republic of Vietnam. The LASV was controlled and equipped by the PAVN.

General Trần Văn Trà, one-time commander of the B2 Front (Saigon) HQ confirms that even though the PAVN and the LASV were confident in their ability to defeat the regular ARVN forces, U.S. intervention in Vietnam forced them to reconsider their operations. The decision was made to continue to pursue "main force" engagements even though "there were others in the South – they were not military people – who wanted to go back to guerrilla war," but the strategic aims were adjusted to meet the new reality.

We had to change our plan and make it different from when we fought the Saigon regime, because we now had to fight two adversaries — the United States and South Vietnam. We understood that the U.S. Army was superior to our own logistically, in weapons and in all things. So strategically we did not hope to defeat the U.S. Army completely. Our intentions were to fight a long time and cause heavy casualties to the United States, so the United States would see that the war was unwinnable and would leave.

During the Vietnamese Lunar New Year Tết holiday starting on 30 January 1968, the PAVN/VC launched a general offensive in more than 60 cities and towns throughout south of Vietnam against the US Army and Army of the Republic of Vietnam (ARVN), beginning with operations in the border region to try to draw US forces and ARVN troops out of the major cities. In coordinated attacks, the U.S. Embassy in Saigon, Presidential Palace, Headquarters of the Joint General Staff and Republic of Vietnam Navy, TV and Radio Stations, Tan Son Nhat Air Base in Saigon were attacked by commando forces known as "đặc công". This offensive became known as the "Tet Offensive". The PAVN sustained heavy losses of its main forces in southern military zones. Some of its regular forces and command structure had to escape to Laos and Cambodia to avoid counterattacks from US forces and ARVN, while local guerrillas forces and political organisations in South Vietnam were exposed and had a hard time remaining within the Mekong Delta area due to the extensive use of the Phoenix Program.

Although the PAVN lost militarily to the US forces and ARVN in the south, the political impact of the war in the United States was strong. Public demonstrations increased in ferocity and quantity after the Tet Offensive. During 1970, the 5th, 7th and 9th Divisions fought in Cambodia against U.S., ARVN, and Cambodian Khmer National Armed Forces. The PAVN gained new allies: the Khmer Rouge and guerrilla fighters supporting deposed Prime Minister Sihanouk. In 1975 the PAVN were successful in aiding the Khmer Rouge in toppling Lon Nol's U.S.-backed regime, despite heavy US bombing.

After the withdrawal of most U.S. combat forces from Indochina because of the Vietnamisation strategy, the PAVN launched the ill-fated Easter Offensive in 1972. Although successful at the beginning, the South Vietnamese repulsed the main assaults with U.S. air support. Still North Vietnam retained some South Vietnamese territory.

Nearly two years after the full U.S. withdrawal from Indochina in accordance with the terms of the 1973 Paris Peace Accords, the PAVN launched a Spring offensive aimed at overthrowing the South Vietnamese government and uniting Vietnam under communist rule. Without direct support of the U.S., and suffering from stresses caused by dwindling aid, the ARVN was ill-prepared to confront the highly motivated PAVN, and despite the on paper superiority of the ARVN, the PAVN quickly secured victory within two months and captured Saigon on 30 April 1975, ending the 20 year Vietnam war.

After national reunification, the LASV was officially merged into PAVN on 2 July 1976.

=== Sino-Vietnamese conflicts (1975–1991) ===
Towards the second half of the 20th century the armed forces of Vietnam would participate in organised incursions to protect its citizens and allies against aggressive military factions in the neighbouring Indochinese countries of Laos and Cambodia, and the defensive border wars with China.

- The PAVN had forces in Laos to secure the Ho Chi Minh trail and to militarily support the Pathet Lao. In 1975 the Pathet Lao and PAVN forces succeeded in toppling the Royal Laotian regime and installing a new, and pro-Hanoi government, the Lao People's Democratic Republic, that rules Laos to this day.
- Parts of Sihanouk's neutral Cambodia were occupied by troops as well. A pro US coup led by Lon Nol in 1970 led to the foundation pro-US Khmer Republic state. This marked the beginning of the Cambodian Civil War. The PAVN aided Khmer Rouge forces in toppling Lon Nol's government in 1975. In 1978, along with the FUNSK Cambodian Salvation Front, the Vietnamese and Ex-Khmer Rouge forces succeeded in toppling Pol Pot's Democratic Kampuchea regime and installing a new government, the People's Republic of Kampuchea.
- During the Sino-Vietnamese War and the Sino-Vietnamese conflicts (1979–1991), Vietnamese forces would conduct cross-border raids into Chinese territory to destroy artillery ammunition. This greatly contributed to the outcome of the Sino-Vietnamese War, as the Chinese forces ran out of ammunition already at an early stage and had to call in reinforcements.
- While occupying Cambodia, Vietnam launched several armed incursions into Thailand in pursuit of Cambodian guerrillas that had taken refuge on the Thai side of the border.

== Modern deployment ==
The PAVN has been actively involved in Vietnam's workforce to develop the economy of Vietnam by co-ordinating national defence. It has regularly sent troops to aid with natural disasters such as flooding, landslides etc. The PAVN is also involved in such areas as industry, agriculture, forestry, fishery and telecommunications. The PAVN has numerous small firms which have become quite profitable in recent years. However, recent decrees have effectively prohibited the commercialisation of the military. Conscription is in place for theoretically every male, age 18 to 27 years old, with the exception of the disabled and men who attended universities right after high school.

=== International presence & operations ===
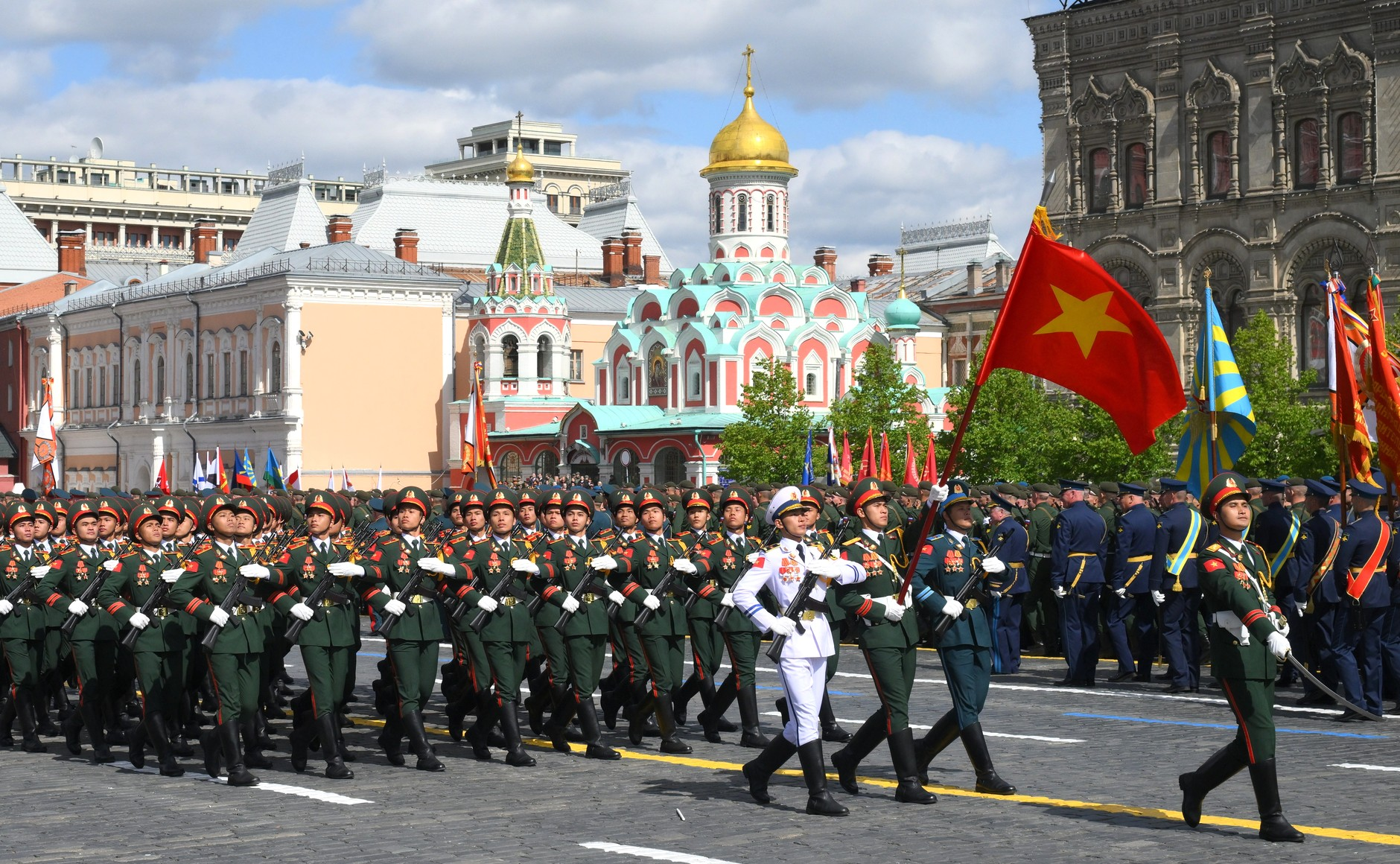
People's Army on Red Square in Moscow during the Victory Day parade on 9 May 2025

The Foreign Relations Department of the Ministry of National Defence organises international operations of the PAVN.

Apart from its occupation of half of the disputed Spratly Islands, which have been claimed as Vietnamese territory since the 17th century, Vietnam has not officially had forces stationed internationally since its withdrawal from Cambodia and Laos in early 1990.

==== Vietnamese assistance for overseas leftist insurgencies ====
The effectiveness of the People's Army of Vietnam Special Operation Forces during the Vietnam War saw them instruct various other countries and Marxist rebel groups. From the 1970s to 1990s, they covertly provided training at the PAVN Sapper Training School in via Vietnamese sapper advisors assigned to the Cuban Army's Sapper School in Cuba, and, during the 1980s, by a secret Vietnamese sapper training team stationed in Nicaragua. In addition to training Cambodian, Laotian, Soviet, and Cuban military personnel, their publications revealed that among the foreign revolutionary forces that received training in sapper tactics, bomb-making, and the use of weapons and explosives, were members of the Marxist El Salvadoran FMLN (Farabundo Martí National Liberation Front), the Chilean MIR (Revolutionary Left Movement) fighting against the dictatorial regime of Augusto Pinochet, as well as the Colombian FARC (Revolutionary Armed Forces of Colombia) movement, a Marxist guerilla group.

==== Vietnamese intervention in Lao security crises ====
The Center for Public Policy Analysis and non-governmental organisations (NGOs) as well as Laotian and Hmong human rights organisations, including the Lao Human Rights Council, Inc. and the United League for Democracy in Laos, Inc., have provided evidence that since the end of the Vietnam War, significant numbers of Vietnamese military and security forces continue to be sent to Laos, on a repeated basis, to quell and suppress Laotian political and religious dissident and opposition groups including the peaceful 1999 Lao Students for Democracy protest in Vientiane in 1999 and the Hmong rebellion. In late November 2009, shortly before the start of the 2009 Southeast Asian Games in Vientiane, the PAVN undertook a major troop surge in key rural and mountainous provinces in Laos where Lao and Hmong civilians and religious believers, including Christians, have sought sanctuary.

==== Modern-era peacekeeping operations ====
In 2014, Vietnam requested to join United Nations peacekeeping operations, which was later approved. The first Vietnamese UN peacekeeping officers were sent to South Sudan, marked the first involvement of Vietnam into a United Nations' mission abroad. Vietnamese peacekeepers were also sent to the Central African Republic.

From 2022, Vietnam has deployed its first military engineer unit to the peacekeeping missions in Abyei.

==== 2023 Turkish-Syrian earthquake ====
As an effort to help Turkey overcome the consequences of the 2023 earthquake, PAVN has sent 76 servicemen of the Border Guard, Army Medic, and Engineering Corps (alongside personnel from Public Security) to participate in humanitarian assistance and disaster relief including search-and-rescue missions.

This is the first time ever that Vietnam has officially deployed and engaged in an overseas search and rescue campaign.

==== 2025 Myanmar earthquake ====
The PAVN deployed 76 personnel from the Border Guard, Army Medical Corps, and Engineering Corps, along with members of the Public Security forces, to take part in humanitarian assistance, disaster relief, and search-and-rescue operations in Sagaing on 31 March.

==== 2026 Venezuela earthquake ====
The PAVN deployed 124 personnel from the Border Guard, Army Medical Corps, and Engineering Corps, along with members of the Public Security forces, to take part in humanitarian assistance, disaster relief, and search-and-rescue operations on June 28, 2026. Many members of this task force were previously deployed to the earthquakes in Turkey and Myanmar.

During this mission, the task force was assigned to Playa Grande in La Guaira, where it was hit by powerful earthquakes with magnitudes of 7.2 and 7.5 on June 24. The task force was awarded first-class Hero of Venezuela for their tireless efforts in the search and rescue mission.

== Organisation ==
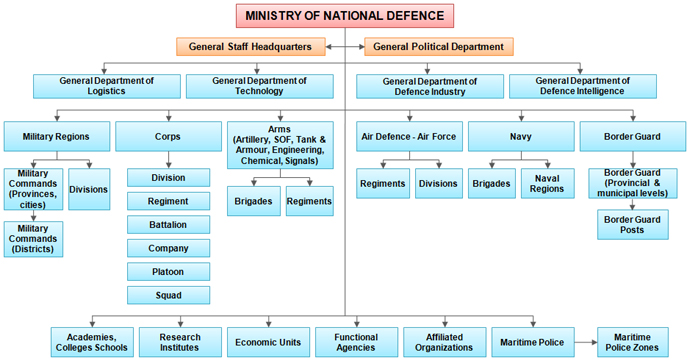
PAVN's structure

The de jure Commander-in-Chief of the Armed Forces is the President of Vietnam, though this position is virtually nominal and a majority of political power over the military is assumed by the Central Military Commission of the ruling Communist Party of Vietnam. The secretary of Central Military Commission (usually the General Secretary of the Communist Party of Vietnam) is the de facto supreme commander and now is Tô Lâm.

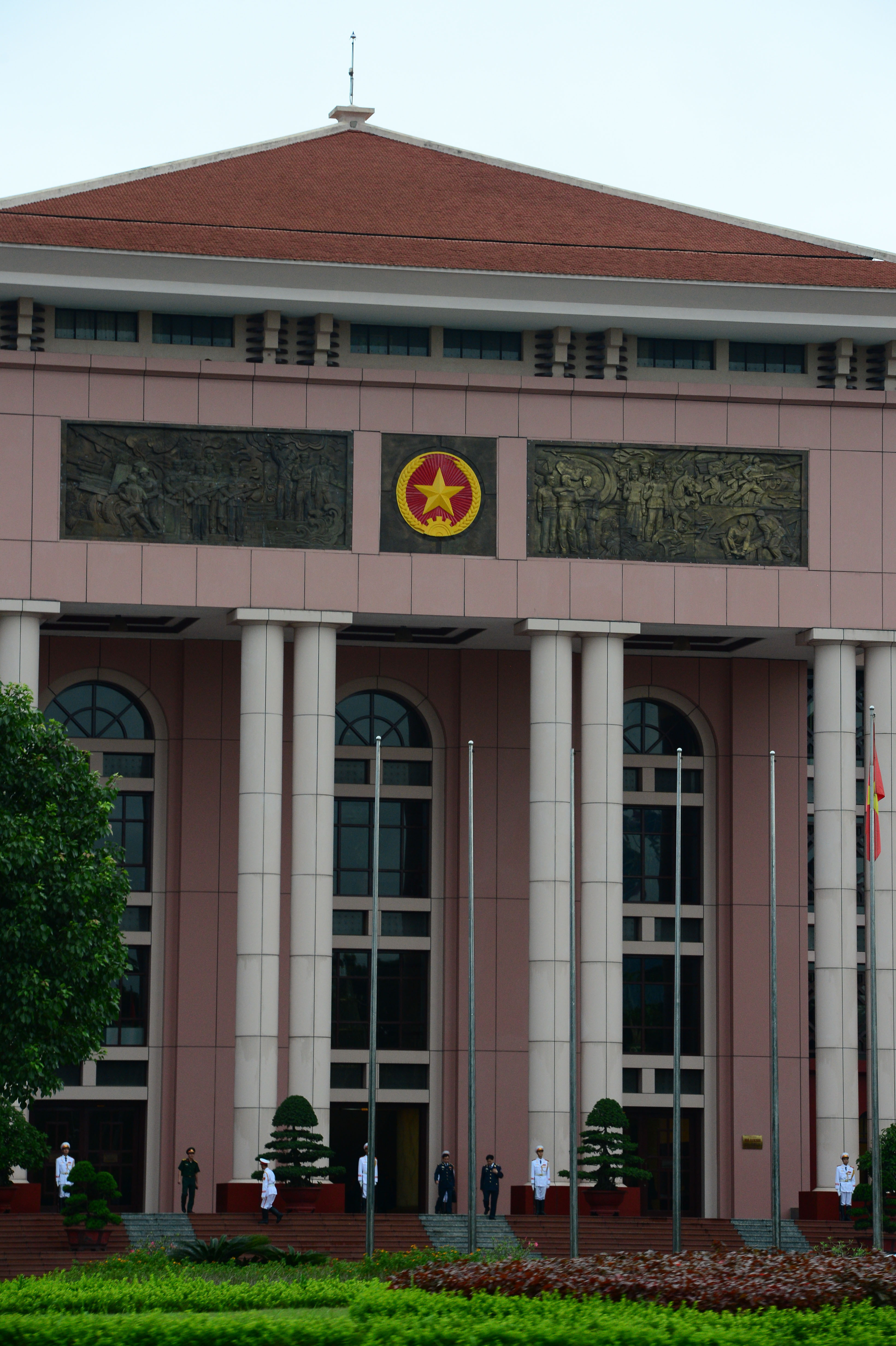
Headquarters of the Ministry of National Defence.

The Minister of National Defence oversees operations of the Ministry of Defence, and the PAVN. He also oversees such agencies as the General Staff and the General Department of Logistics. However, military policy is ultimately directed by the Central Military Commission of the ruling Communist Party of Vietnam.

- Ministry of National Defence: is the lead organisation, highest command and management of the Vietnam People's Army.
- General Staff: is leading agency all levels of the Vietnam People's Army, command all of the armed forces, which functions to ensure combat readiness of the armed forces and manage all military activities in peace and war.
- General Political Department: is the agency in charge of Communist Party affairs – political work within PAVN, which operates under the direct leadership of the Secretariat of the Communist Party of Vietnam and the Central Military Party Committee.
- General Department of Defence Intelligence: is an intelligence agency of the Vietnamese government and military.
- General Department of Logistics: is the agency in charge to ensure logistical support to units of the People's Army.
- General Department of Technology: is the agency in charge to ensure equipped technical means of war for the army and each unit.
- General Department of Defence Industry (commercially branded as the Vietnam Defence Industry): is the agency responsible for the development of the Vietnamese national defence industry in support of the missions of the PAVN.

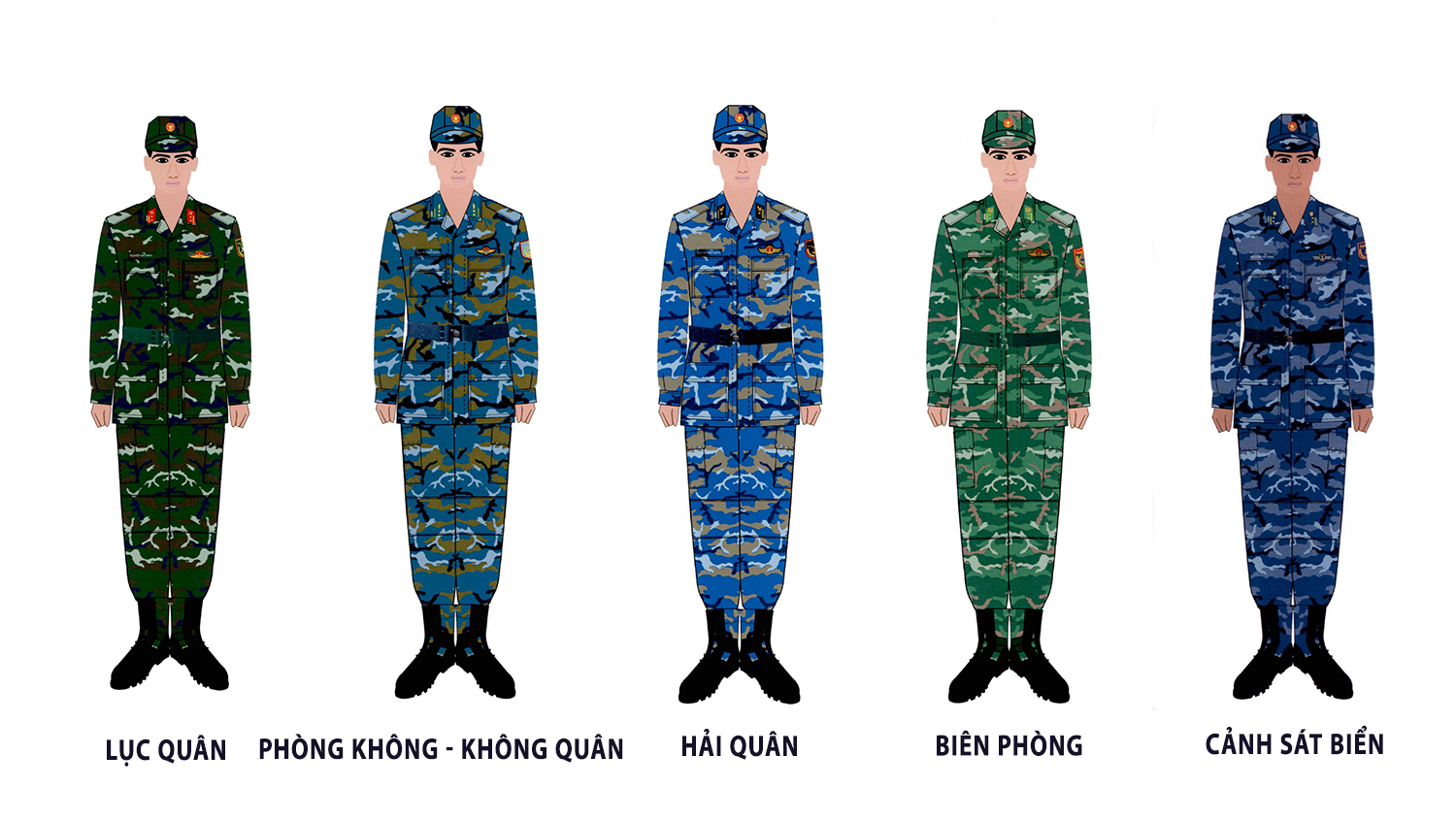
Combat uniforms of the Vietnamese Army with their corresponding colour schemes: Ground Force (combined arms), Air Defence - Air Force, Navy, Border Guard and Coast Guard.

== Service branches ==
The Vietnamese People's Army is subdivided into the following service branches:

- Vietnam People's Ground Force (unofficial)

(Lục quân Nhân dân Việt Nam)

- Vietnam People's Air Force / Air Defence - Air Force

(Không quân Nhân dân Việt Nam / Quân chủng Phòng không - Không quân)

- Vietnam People's Navy

(Hải quân Nhân dân Việt Nam)

- Vietnam Border Guard

(Bộ đội Biên phòng Việt Nam)

- Vietnam Coast Guard

(Cảnh sát biển Việt Nam)

- Artillery - Missile Command

(Bộ Tư lệnh Pháo binh - Tên lửa)

- Cyberspace Operations Command

(Bộ Tư lệnh Tác chiến không gian mạng)

- President Ho Chi Minh Mausoleum Defence Force

(Bộ Tư lệnh Bảo vệ Lăng Chủ tịch Hồ Chí Minh)

The People's Army of Vietnam composes of the standing (or regular) forces and the reserve forces. The standing forces include the main forces and the local forces. During peacetime, the standing forces are minimised in number, and kept combat-ready by regular physical and weapons training, and stock maintenance.

=== Vietnam People's Ground Force ===
==== Arm badges ====
Infantry	Armor	Artillery (reorganised as the Artillery and Missile Command)	Special Forces	Mechanized Infantry	Engineering	Medical	Signals
Transportation	Technical	Chemical	Logistics	Military Police	Military Music Band	Military Athletes	Ensembles

==== Military regions ====
The following military regions are under the direct control of the General Staff and the Ministry of Defence:

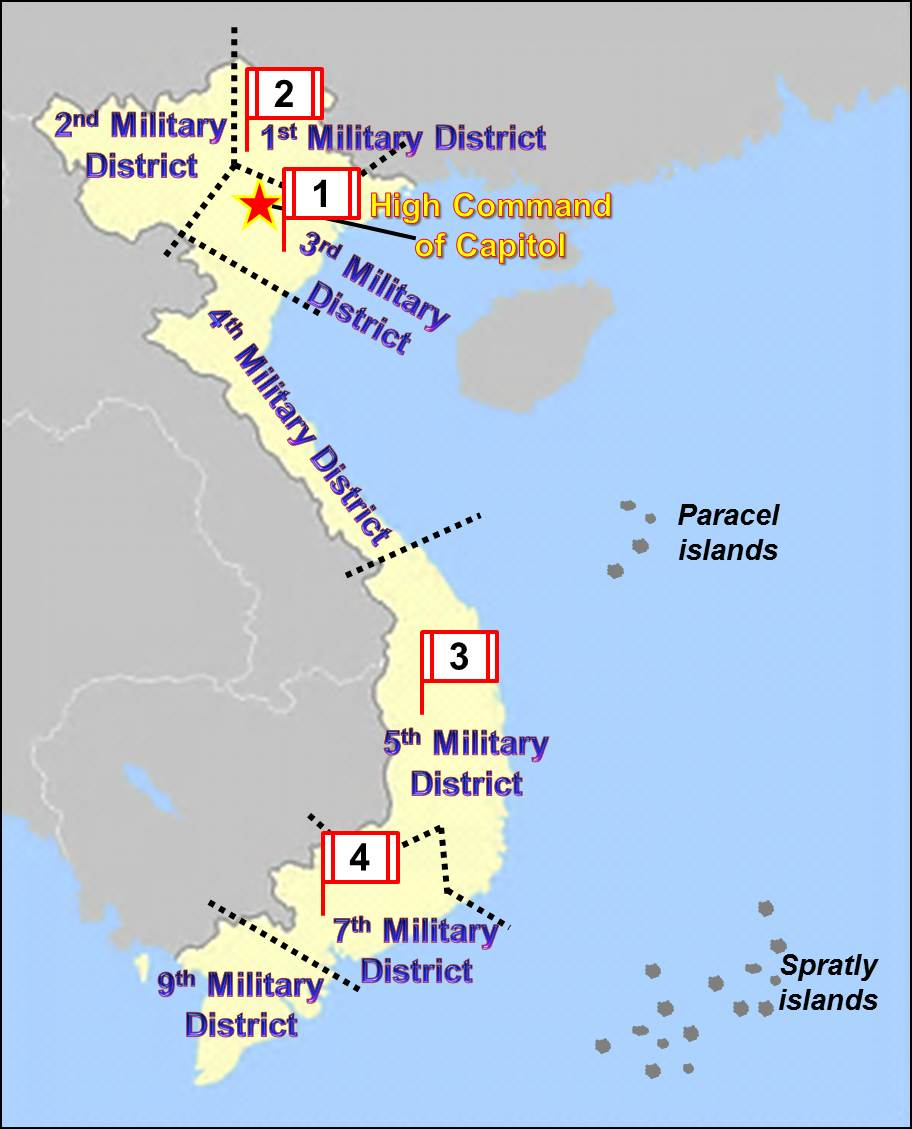
Vietnam Map with eight Military Districts and four Corps

- Hanoi Capital City Special High Command (Bộ Tư lệnh Thủ đô Hà Nội): special command tasked for the defence of the Hanoi Capital Region. Headquarters: Hanoi
- 1st Military Region (Quân khu 1): responsible for the North East of Vietnam. Headquarters: Thái Nguyên
- 2nd Military Region (Quân khu 2): responsible for the North West of Vietnam. Headquarters: Việt Trì, Phú Thọ
- 3rd Military Region (Quân khu 3): responsible for the defence of the Red River Delta (except Hanoi Capital Region). Headquarters: Hai Phong
- 4th Military Region (Quân khu 4): responsible for North Central Vietnam. Headquarters: Vinh, Nghệ An province
- 5th Military Region (Quân khu 5): responsible for South Central Vietnam including the Central Highlands and Southern Central coastal provinces. Headquarters: Da Nang
- 7th Military Region (Quân khu 7): responsible for Southeast Vietnam. Headquarters: Ho Chi Minh City
- 9th Military Region (Quân khu 9): responsible for the Mekong Delta. Headquarters: Cần Thơ

==== Main forces ====
PAVN military vehicles roundel.

PAVN Ground Forces military vehicles roundel (Seen in the 80th National Day Military Parade)

Badge on all personnel uniforms.

Patch on field uniform.

The Main Force of the PAVN and its People's Ground Forces consists of combat ready troops, as well as support units such as educational institutions for logistics, officer training, and technical training. In 1991, Conboy et al. stated that the PAVN Ground Force had four 'Strategic Army Corps' in the early 1990s, numbering 1–4, from north to south. 1st Corps, located in the Red River Delta region, consisted of the 308th (one of the six original 'Steel and Iron' divisions) and 312th Divisions, and the 309th Infantry Regiment. The other three corps, 2 SAC, 3 SAC, and 4 SAC, were further south, with 4th Corps, in Southern Vietnam, consisting of two former LASV divisions, the 7th and 9th.

From 2014 to 2016, the IISS Military Balance attributed the Vietnamese ground forces with an estimated 412,000 personnel. Formations, according to the IISS, include 8 military regions, 4 corps headquarters, 1 special forces airborne brigade, 6 armoured brigades and 3 armoured regiments, two mechanised infantry divisions, and 23 active infantry divisions plus another 9 reserve ones.

Combat support formations include 13 artillery brigades and one artillery regiment, 11 air defence brigades, 10 engineers brigades, 1 electronic warfare unit, 3 signals brigades and 2 signals regiment.

Combat service support formations include 9 economic construction divisions, 1 logistical regiment, 1 medical unit and 1 training regiment. Ross wrote in 1984 that economic construction division "are composed of regular troops that are fully trained and armed, and reportedly they are subordinate to their own directorate in the Ministry of Defense. They have specific military missions; however, they are also entrusted with economic tasks such as food production or construction work. They are composed partially of older veterans." Ross also cited 1980s sources saying that economic construction divisions each had a strength of about 3,500.

In 2017, the listing was amended, with the addition of a single Short-range ballistic missile brigade. The ground forces according to the IISS, hold Scud-B/C SRBMs.

12th Corps

First organised on 21 November 2023, the 12th Corps was created by merging all of the units from the former 1st Corps and the 2nd Corps. It is stationed in Tam Điệp District, Ninh Bình.

34th Corps

First organised on 10 December 2024, the 34th Corps was created by merging all of the units from the former 3rd Corps and the 4th Corps. Stationed in Pleiku, Gia Lai.

==== Local forces ====
Local forces are an entity of the PAVN that, together with the militia and "self-defence forces", act on the local level in protection of people and local governmental authorities. While the local forces are regular VPA forces, the people's militia consists of rural civilians, and the people's self-defence forces consist of civilians who live in urban areas and/or work in large groups, such as at construction sites or farming estates. The current number stands at 3–4 million reservists and militia personnel combined who wear PAVN uniforms. They serve as force multipliers to the PAVN and Public Security during wartime and peacetime contingencies.

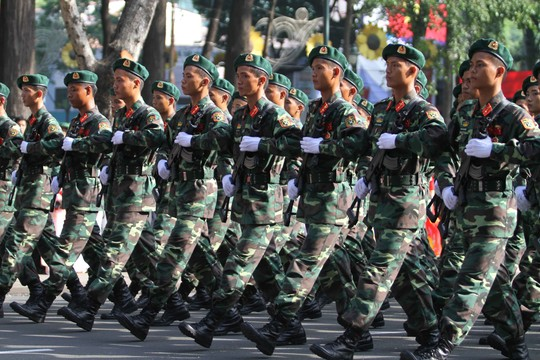
PAVN reconnaissance troops in 2015.

== Ranks and insignia ==
=== Commissioned officer ranks ===
The rank insignia of commissioned officers.

Rank group	General / flag officers				Senior officers				Junior officers
Vietnam People's Ground Force
Vietnam People's Ground Force	Đại tướng	Thượng tướng	Trung tướng	Thiếu tướng	Đại tá	Thượng tá	Trung tá	Thiếu tá	Đại úy	Thượng úy	Trung úy	Thiếu úy

=== Other ranks ===
The rank insignia of non-commissioned officers and enlisted personnel.

Rank group	Senior NCOs		Junior NCOs	Enlisted
Vietnam People's Ground Force
Vietnam People's Ground Force	Thượng sĩ	Trung sĩ	Hạ sĩ	Binh nhất	Binh nhì

== Equipment ==
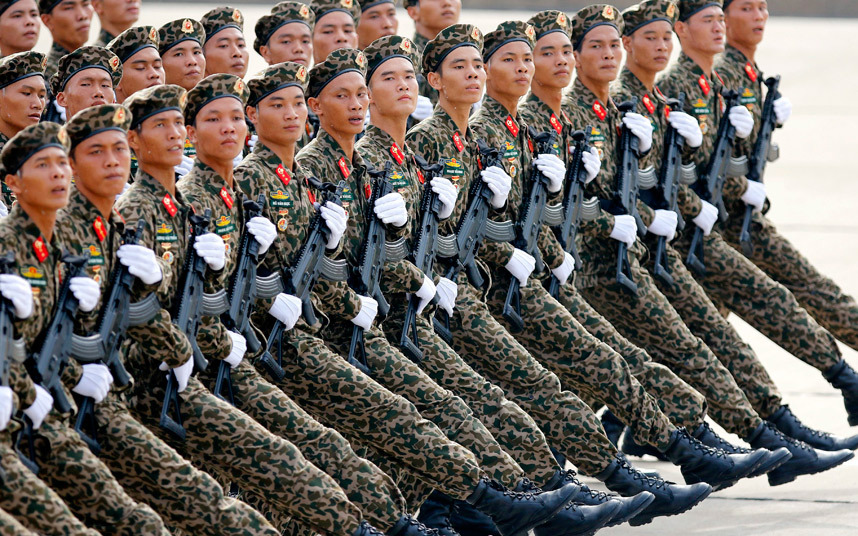
People's Army of Vietnam Special Forces parading in 2015 with Israeli-licence ACE 31 rifles.

From the 1960s to 1975 the Soviet Union, along with some smaller Eastern Bloc countries, was the main supplier of military hardware to North Vietnam. After the latter's victory in the war, it remained the main supplier of equipment to Vietnam. The United States had been the primary supplier of equipment to South Vietnam; much of the equipment left by the U.S. Army and the ARVN came under control of the re-unified Vietnamese government. The PAVN captured large numbers of ARVN weapons on 30 April 1975 after Saigon was captured.

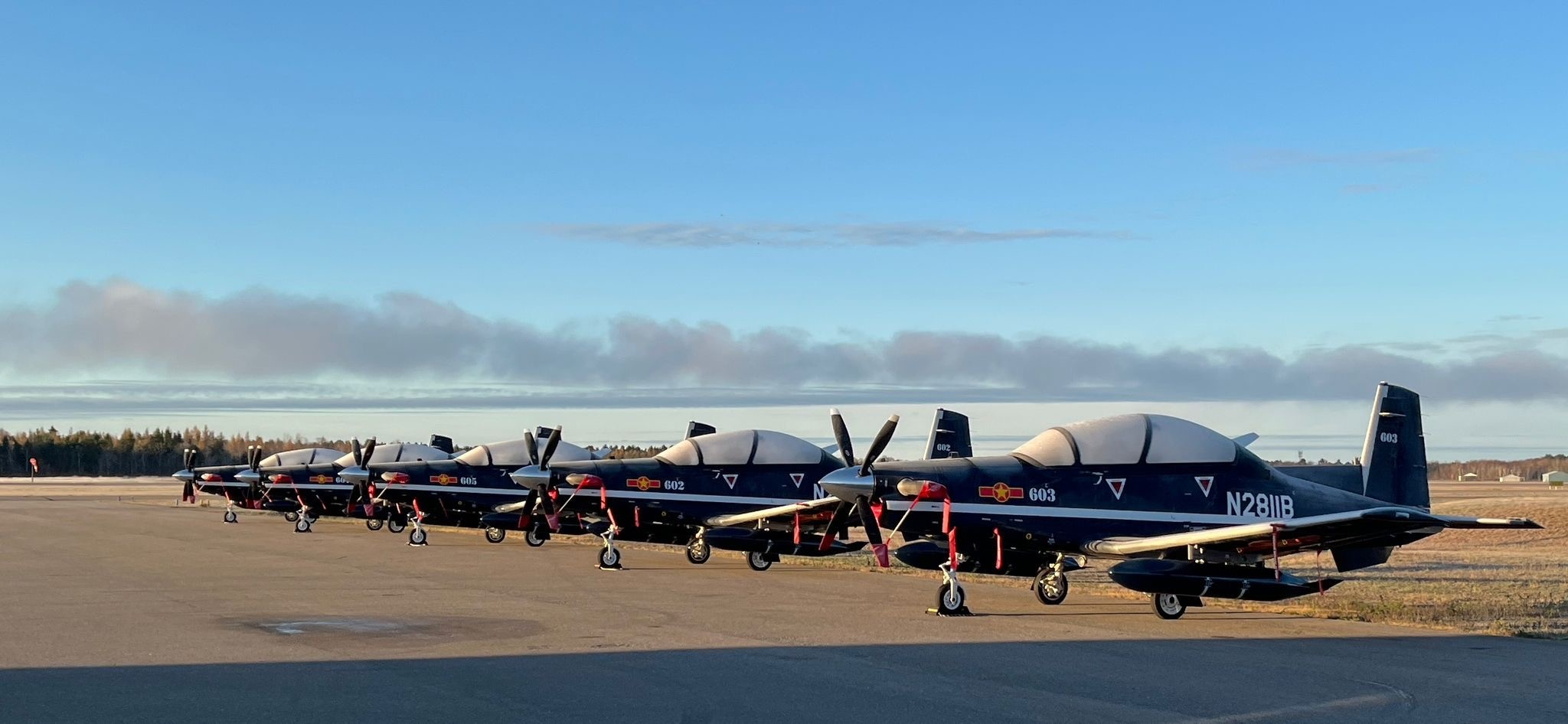
The T-6C Texan II trainer aircraft are one of the first major assets that PAVN has procured from its former enemy United States in the modern era.

Russia remains the largest arms-supplier for Vietnam; even after 1986, there were also increasing arms sales from other nations, notably from India, Turkey, Israel, Japan, South Korea, and France. In 2016, President Barack Obama announced the lifting of the lethal weapons embargo on Vietnam, which has increased Vietnamese military equipment choices from other countries such as the United States, the United Kingdom, and other Western countries, which could enable a faster modernisation of the Vietnamese military. Since 2018, the United States has begun to provide warships for Vietnam Coast Guard as part of the military cooperation between two states, the first of these ships arrived in 2021.

Despite Russia remaining Vietnam's largest weapon supplier, increasing cooperation with Israel has resulted in the development of Vietnamese weaponry with a strong mixture of Russian and Israeli weapons. For examples, the STV rifles are three Vietnam-made indigenous service rifles modelled after the Galil ACE of Israel.
