= Sa (rank) =

Military rank of Japan, Vietnam, and North Korea

Sa (Japanese: 佐; Korean: 좌; Hanja: 佐; RR: jwa; Vietnamese: tá) is the rank held by field-grade officers in the militaries of Japan, Vietnam, and North Korea.

== Japan ==
The only difference between rank names are the use of morphemes, which are riku (Japanese: 陸, lit. 'land'), kai (Japanese: 海, lit. 'sea') or kū (Japanese: 空, lit. 'air').

Rank group	Senior officers
	1等佐 (Ittō sa)	2等佐 (Nitō sa)	3等佐 (Santō sa)
Literal translation	Aide first class	Aide second class	Aide third class
Japanese Ground Forces
U.S. equivalent	Colonel	Lieutenant colonel	Major
Japanese Navy
U.S. equivalent	Captain	Commander	Lieutenant commander
Japanese Air Force
U.S. equivalent	Colonel	Lieutenant colonel	Major
	1等佐 (Ittō sa)	2等佐 (Nitō sa)	3等佐 (Santō sa)
Rank group	Senior officers

== North Korea ==
- Jwa
- Hangul: 좌
- Hanja: 佐
- RR: jwa
- MR: chwa

Rank group	Senior officers
Hangul	대좌	상좌	중좌	소좌
Hanja	大佐	上佐	中佐	少佐
Romanization	Daechwa	Sangjwa	Chungjwa	Sojwa
Literal translation	Great assistant	Upper assistant	Middle assistant	Small assistant
Korean People's Army Ground Force
U.S. equivalent	None	Colonel	Lieutenant colonel	Major
Korean People's Navy
U.S. equivalent	None	Captain	Commander	Lieutenant commander
Korean People's Army Air Force
U.S. equivalent	None	Colonel	Lieutenant colonel	Major
	대좌; Daechwa	상좌; Sangjwa	중좌; Chungjwa	소좌; Sojwa
Rank group	Senior officers

== Vietnam ==
Rank group	Senior officers
Vietnamese	Đại tá	Thượng tá	Trung tá	Thiếu tá
Chữ Hán	大佐	上佐	中佐	少佐
Literal translation	Grand assistant	Upper assistant	Middle assistant	Lower assistant
Vietnam People's Ground Force (Note: Same insignia for the Cyberspace Operations and Mausoleum Command.)
Vietnam People's Navy
Vietnam People's Air Force
Vietnam Border Guard
Vietnam Coast Guard
Vietnamese	Đại tá	Thượng tá	Trung tá	Thiếu tá
Rank group	Senior officers

=== South Vietnamese variant ===
Rank group	Senior officers
Vietnamese	Đại tá	Trung tá	Thiếu tá
Chữ Hán	大佐	中佐	少佐
Literal translation	Grand assistant	Middle assistant	Lower assistant
Army of the Republic of Vietnam (1967–1975)
Translation	Colonel	Lieutenant colonel	Major
Republic of Vietnam Navy (1967–1975)
Translation	Captain	Commander	Lieutenant commander
Republic of Vietnam Marine Division (1967–1975)
Translation	Colonel	Lieutenant colonel	Major
Republic of Vietnam Air Force (1967–1975)
Translation	Colonel	Lieutenant colonel	Major
Vietnamese	Đại tá	Trung tá	Thiếu tá
Rank group	Senior officers

== See also ==
Ranks used in Chinese character-using countries

- General officer: Jiang (rank)
- Senior officer: Sa (rank), Xiao (rank), Lyeong
- Junior officer: Wei (rank)
- Non-commissioned officers: Shi (rank)
- Enlisted ranks: Bing (rank), Shi (rank)
