= Wei (rank) =

Company-grade officer in Chinese armed forces

Chinese name
- Traditional Chinese: 尉
- Simplified Chinese: 尉
Transcriptions
Standard Mandarin
- Hanyu Pinyin: wèi
- Wade–Giles: wei

Vietnamese name
- Vietnamese alphabet: úy
- Chữ Hán: 尉

Korean name
- Hangul: 위
- Hanja: 尉
Transcriptions
- Revised Romanization: wi
- McCune–Reischauer: wi

Japanese name
- Kanji: 尉
Transcriptions
- Romanization: wi

Wei is a company-grade officer rank used in some East Asian militaries, including China, Taiwan, North Korea and South Korea.

== Chinese variant ==
=== People's Liberation Army ===
The same rank names are used for all services, prefixed by haijun (simplified Chinese: 海军; traditional Chinese: 海軍; lit. 'naval force') or kongjun (simplified Chinese: 空军; traditional Chinese: 空軍; lit. 'air force').

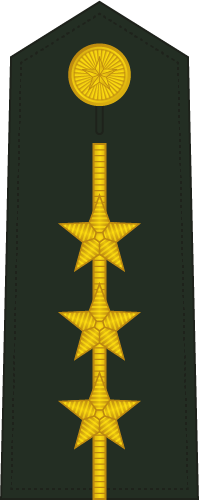
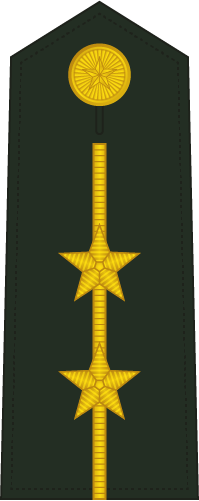
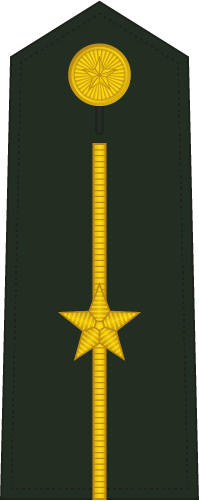
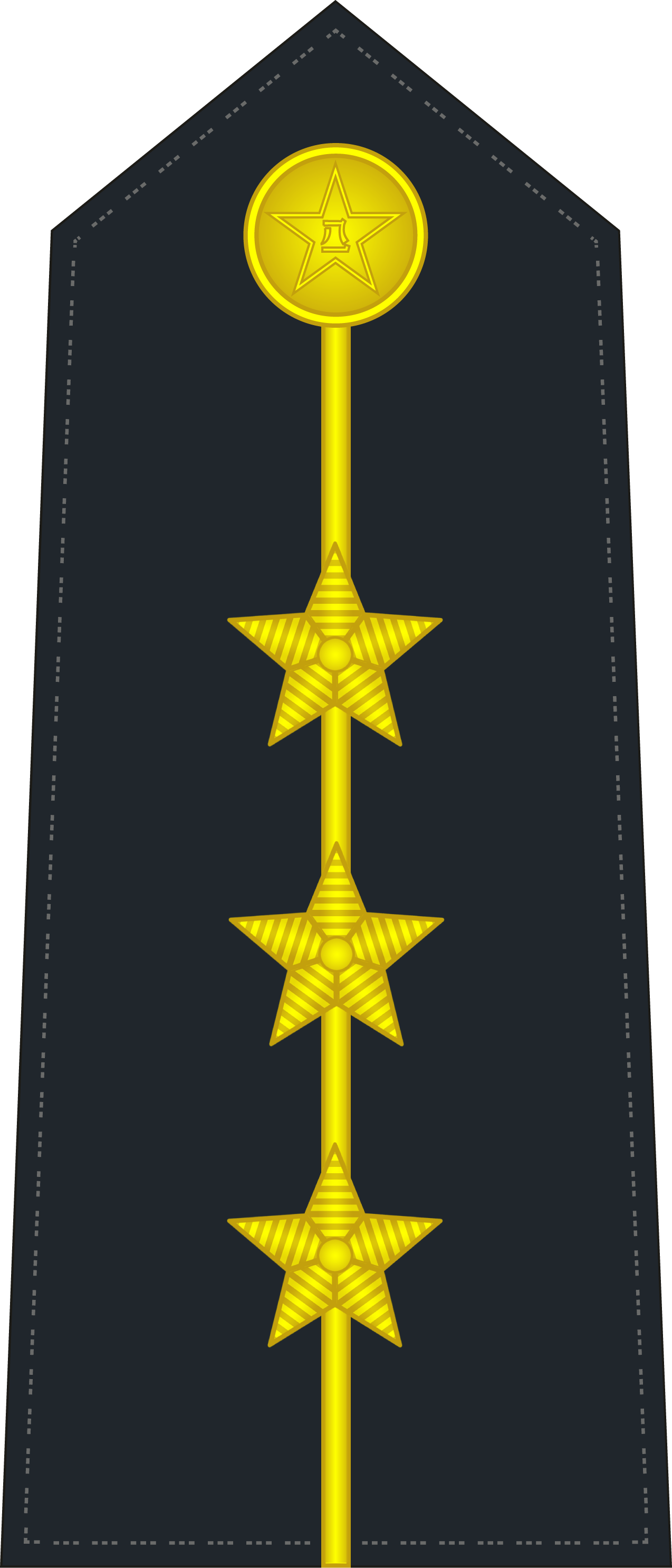
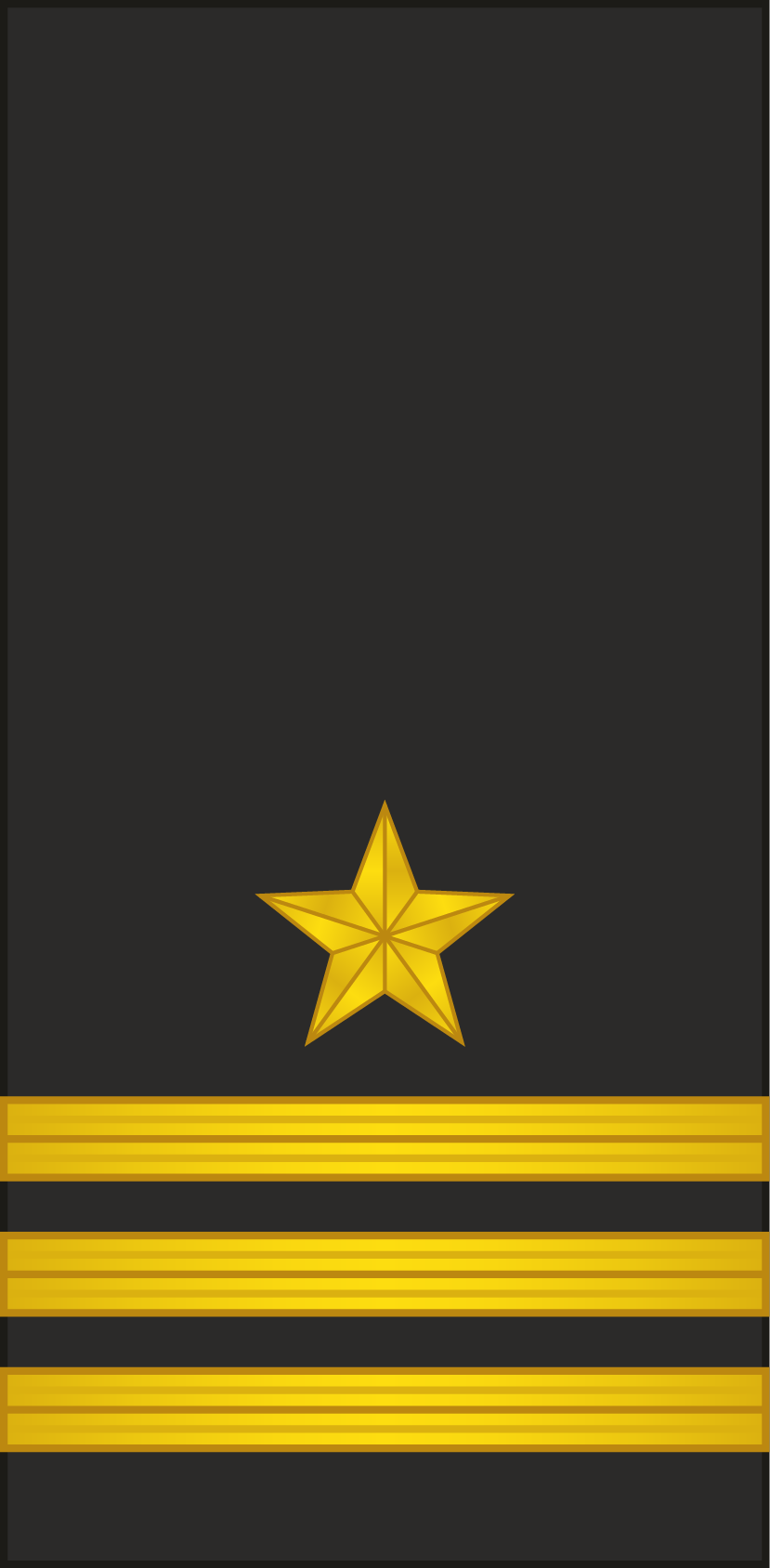
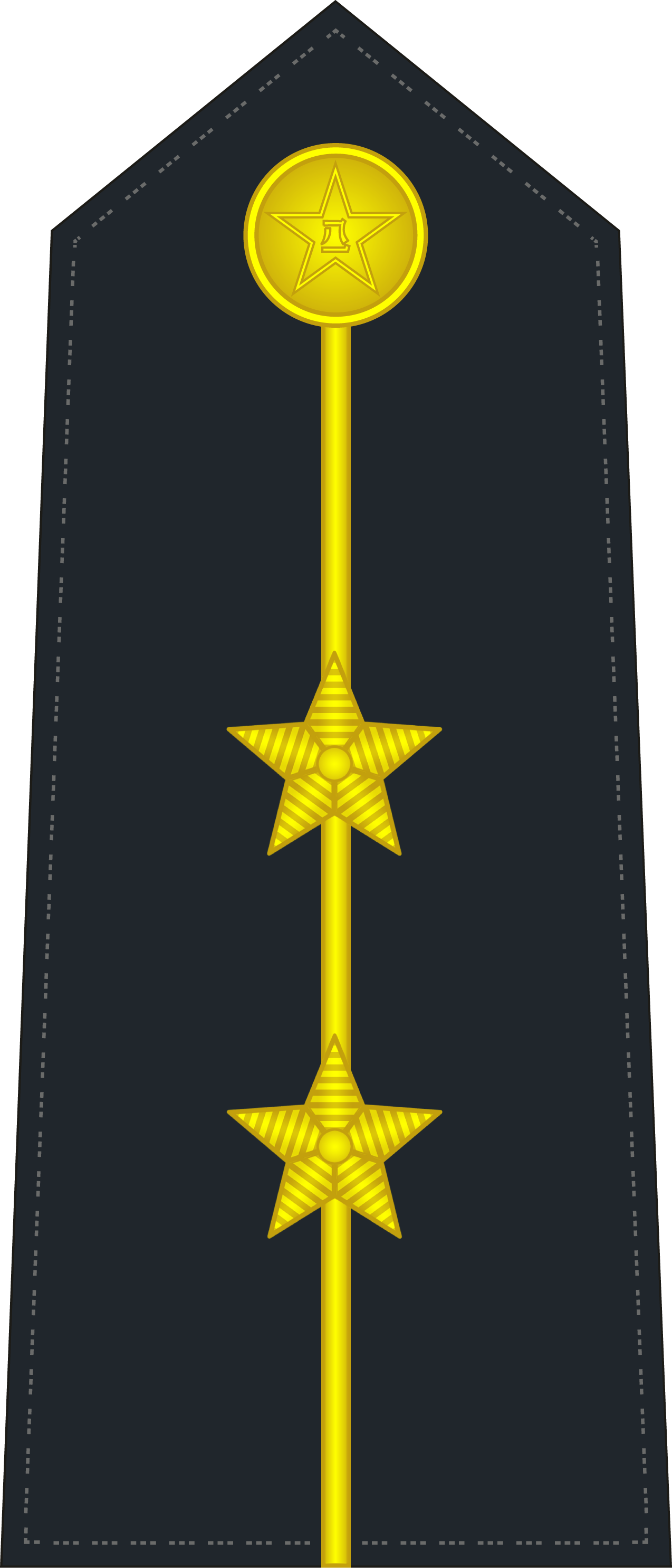
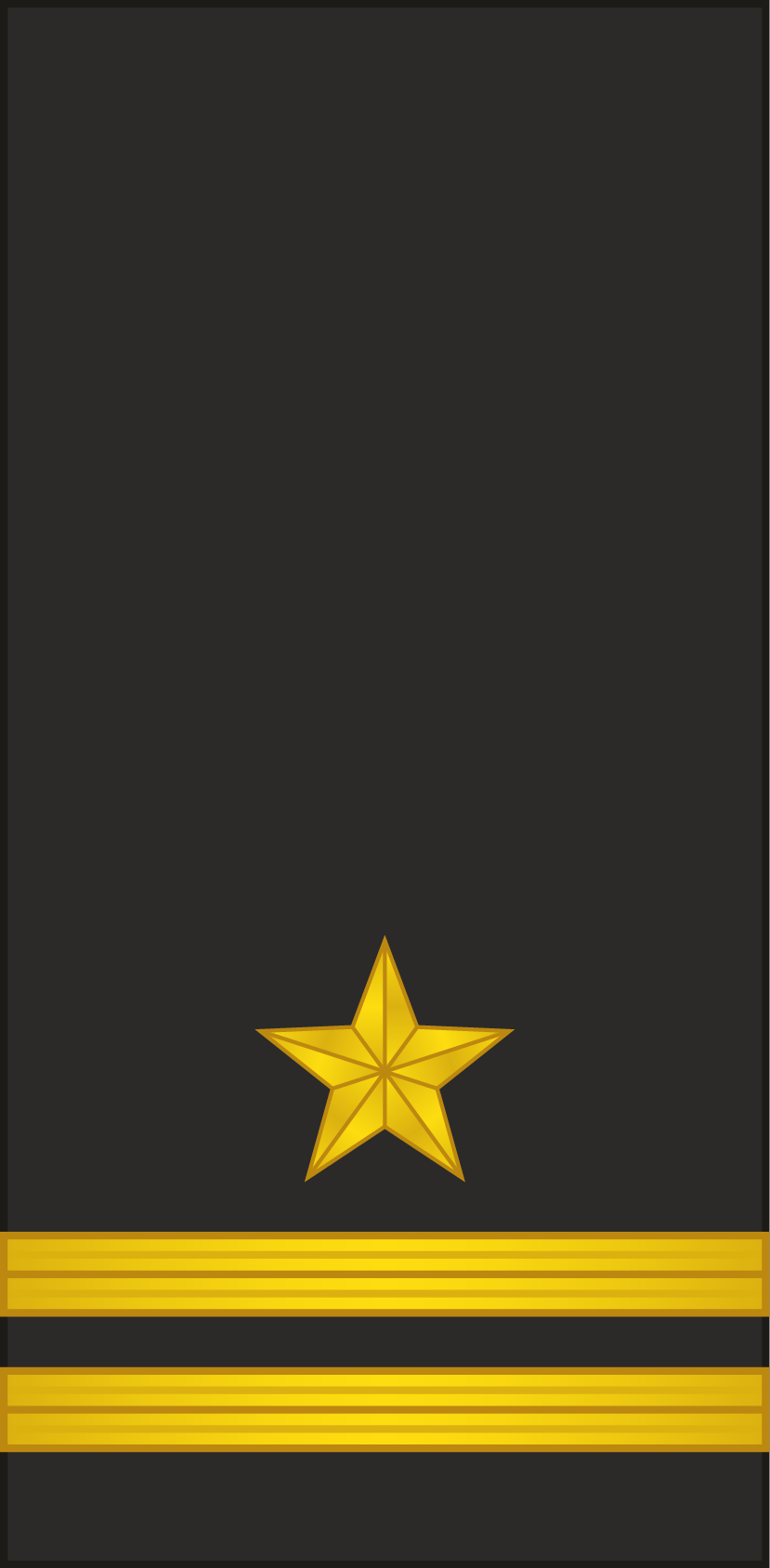
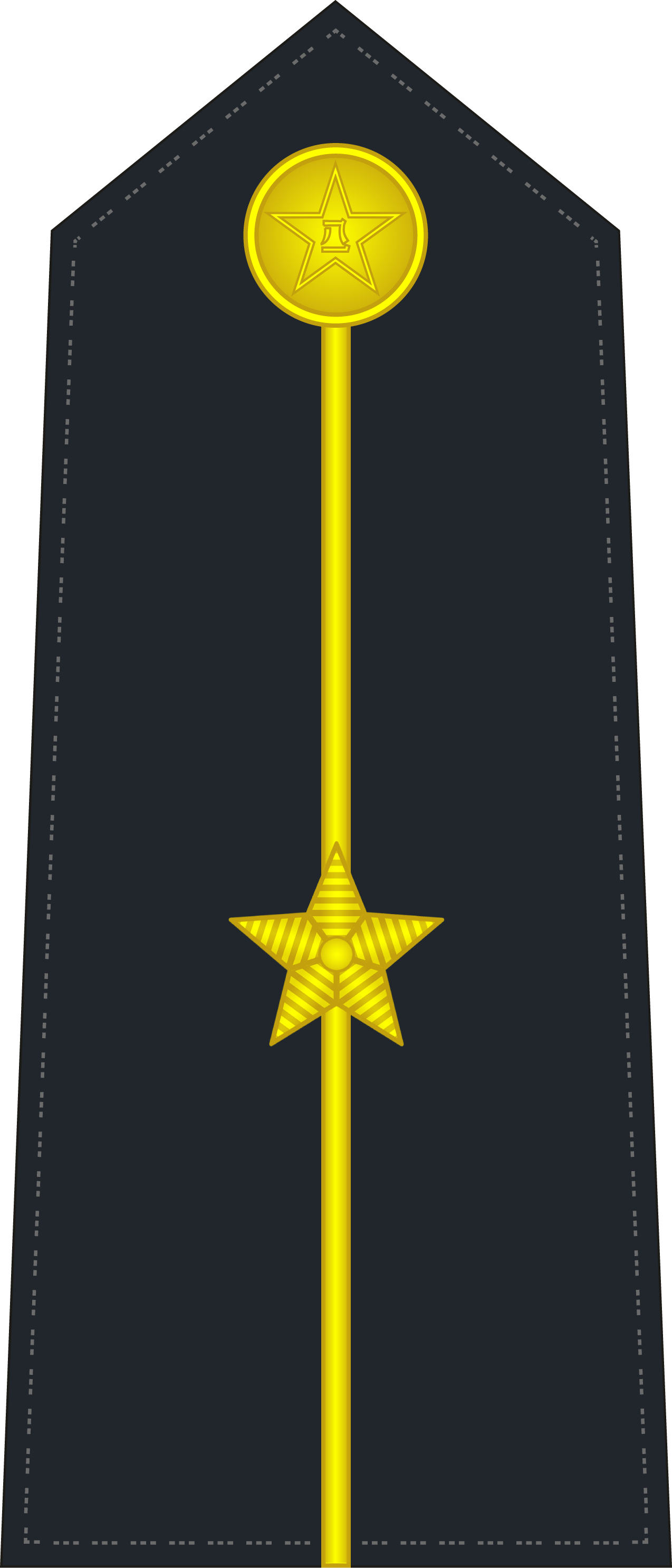
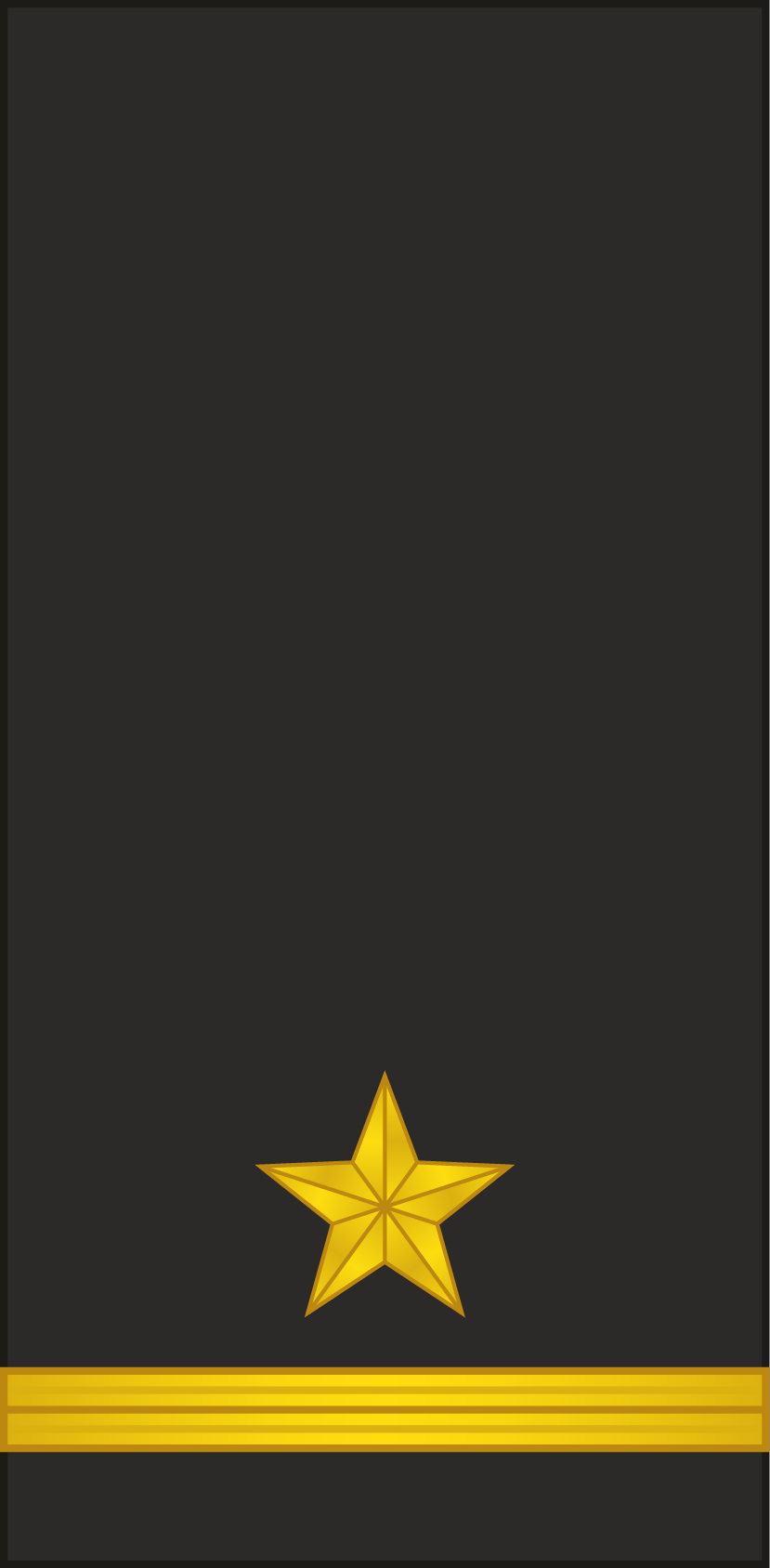
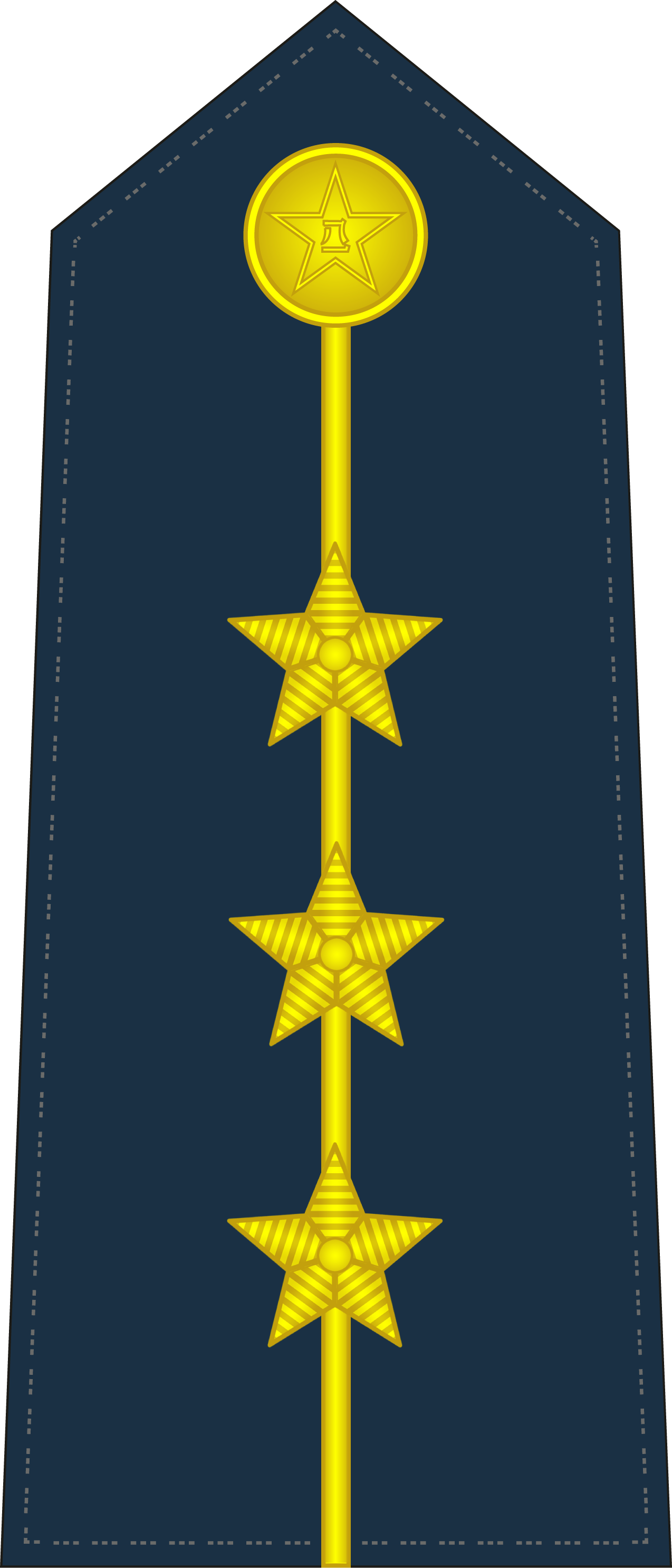
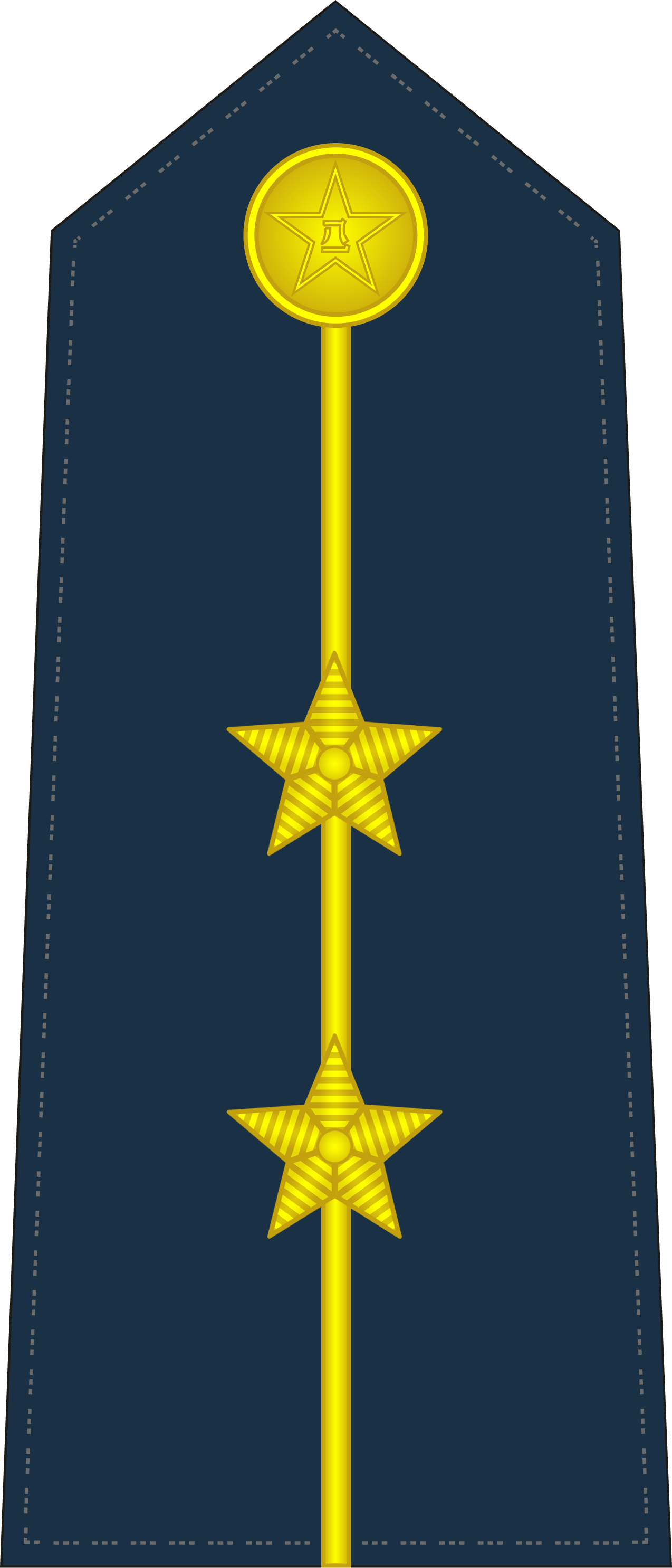
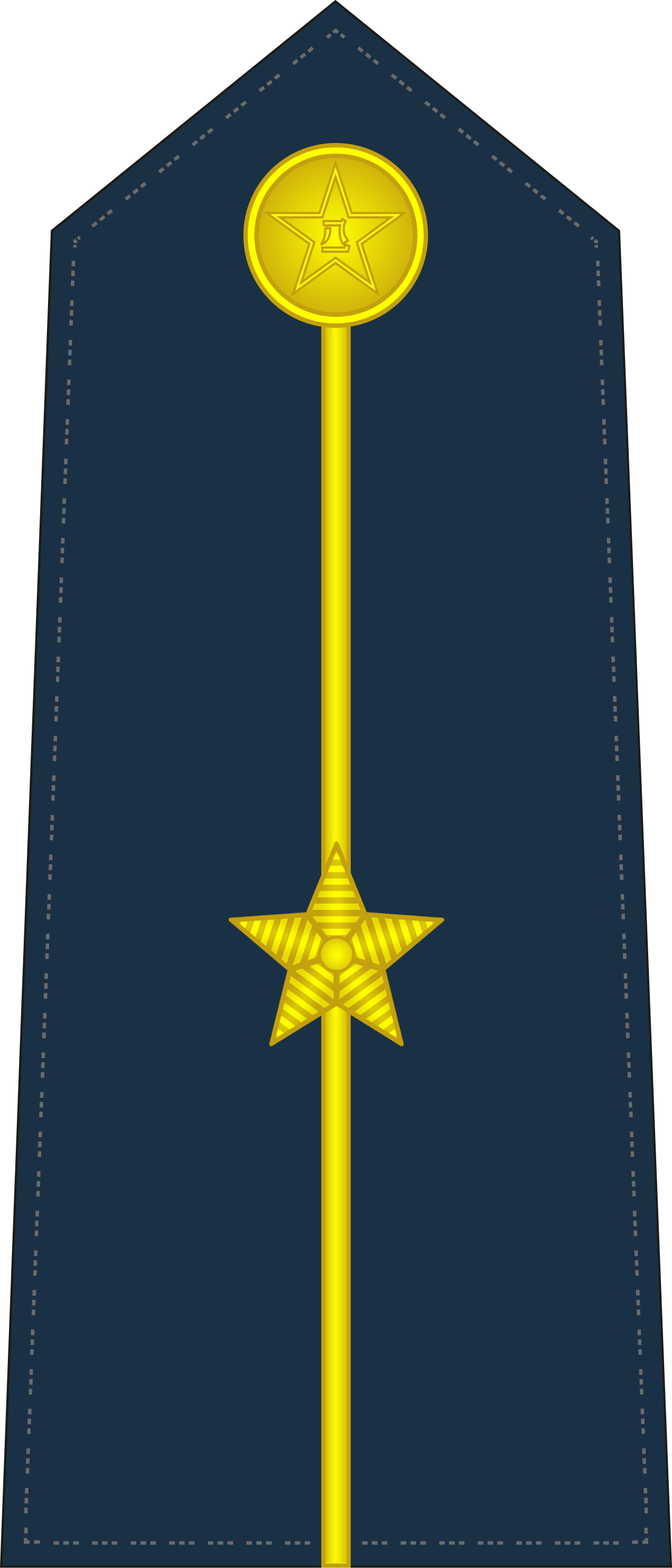
Rank group	Junior officers
Chinese	大尉	上尉	中尉	少尉
Pinyin	Dàwèi	Shàngwèi	Zhōngwèi	Shǎowèi
Literal translation	Great officer	Upper officer	Middle officer	Lower officer
PLA Ground Forces (Note: Same insignia for the Armed Police, Rocket Force, Aerospace Force, and Cyberspace Force.)	Used only 1955–1965
PLA Navy	Used only 1955–1965
PLA Air Force	Used only 1955–1965
	大尉; Da wei	上尉; Shang wei	中尉; Zhong wei	少尉; Shao wei
Rank group	Junior officers

=== Republic of China Armed Forces ===
Rank group	Junior officers
Chinese	上尉	中尉	少尉
Taiwanese Hokkien	Siōng-ùi	Tiong-ùi	Siáu-ùi
Literal translation	Upper officer	Middle officer	Lower officer
Republic of China Army
Republic of China Military Police
Republic of China Navy
Republic of China Air Force
Republic of China Marine Corps
	上尉; Siōng-ùi	中尉; Tiong-ùi	少尉; Siáu-ùi
Rank group	Junior officers

== Korean variant ==
- Wi
- Hangul: 위
- Hanja: 尉
- RR: wi
- MR: wi

=== North Korea ===
Rank group	Junior officers
Hangul	대위	상위	중위	소위
Hanja	大尉	上尉	中尉	少尉
Romanization	Taewi	Sangwi	Chungwi	Sowi
Literal translation	Great rank	Upper rank	Middle rank	Lower rank
Korean People's Army Ground Force
Korean People's Army Ground Force	Senior captain	Captain	First lieutenant	Second lieutenant
Korean People's Navy
Korean People's Navy	Senior lieutenant	Lieutenant	Lieutenant junior grade	Ensign
Korean People's Army Air Force
Korean People's Army Air Force	Senior captain	Captain	First lieutenant	Second lieutenant
	대위; Taewi	상위; Sangwi	중위; Chungwi	소위; Sowi
Rank group	Junior officers

=== South Korea ===
Rank group	Junior officers
Hangul	대위	중위	소위	준위
Hanja	大尉	中尉	少尉	准尉
Romanization	Daewi	Jungwi	Sowi	Junwi
Literal translation	Great rank	Middle rank	Small rank	Given rank
Republic of Korea Army
Republic of Korea Army	Captain	First lieutenant	Second lieutenant	Warrant officer
Republic of Korea Navy
Translation	Lieutenant	Lieutenant junior grade	Ensign	Warrant officer
Republic of Korea Air Force
Republic of Korea Air Force	Captain	First lieutenant	Second lieutenant	Warrant officer
Republic of Korea Marine Corps
Republic of Korea Marine Corps	Captain	First lieutenant	Second lieutenant	Warrant officer
	대위; Daewi	중위; Jungwi	소위; Sowi	준위; Junwi
Rank group	Junior officers

== Vietnamese variant ==
Rank group	Junior officers
Native name	Đại úy	Thượng úy	Trung úy	Thiếu úy
Chữ Hán	大尉	上尉	中尉	少尉
Literal translation	Grand officer	Upper officer	Middle officer	Smaller officer
Vietnam People's Ground Force (Note: Same insignia for the Cyberspace Operations and Mausoleum Command.)
Vietnam People's Navy
Vietnam People's Air Force
Vietnam Border Guard
Vietnam Coast Guard
Native name	Đại úy	Thượng úy	Trung úy	Thiếu úy
Rank group	Junior officers

=== South Vietnamese variant ===
Rank group	Junior officers			Officer cadet
Native name	Đại úy	Trung úy	Thiếu úy	Chuẩn úy
Chữ Hán	大尉	中尉	少尉	准尉
Literal translation	Grand officer	Middle officer	Smaller officer	Quasi-officer
Army of the Republic of Vietnam (1967–1975)
Translation	Captain	First lieutenant	Second lieutenant	Aspirant
Republic of Vietnam Navy (1967–1975)
Translation	Lieutenant	Lieutenant (junior grade)	Ensign	Commissioned warrant officer
Republic of Vietnam Marine Division (1967–1975)
Translation	Captain	First lieutenant	Second lieutenant	Aspirant
Republic of Vietnam Air Force (1967–1975)
Translation	Captain	First lieutenant	Second lieutenant	Aspirant
Native name	Đại úy	Trung úy	Thiếu úy	Chuẩn úy
Rank group	Junior officers			Officer cadet

== See also ==
Ranks used in Chinese character-using countries

- General officer: Jiang (rank)
- Senior officer: Sa (rank), Xiao (rank), Lyeong
- Junior officer: Wei (rank)
- Non-commissioned officers: Shi (rank)
- Enlisted ranks: Bing (rank), Shi (rank)
