= History of Vietnamese military ranks =

The system of Vietnamese military ranks was originally introduced on 22 March 1946 by President Ho Chi Minh, originally based on the military ranks system of Japanese military. Reference designs to the military ranks system of the French military. In 1958, the Vietnam People's Army military ranks system was changed, and has no Marshal or General of the Army or Brigadier General. Vietnamese ranks including Colonel General, Senior Colonel or Senior Lieutenant do not exist in many countries.

== Origins ==
According to decree No-33 on 22 March 1946 signed by President Ho Chi Minh, the ranks of the Vietnamese National Army (former name of the Vietnam People's Army since 1950) were ordered to be as follows:

1. General level (3 ranks):

- General: 3 gold stars on red background
- Lieutenant General: 2 gold stars on red background
- Major General: 1 gold stars on red background

2. Field Grade level (3 ranks):

- Colonel: 3 yellow chevrons and 1 gold star on red background
- Lieutenant Colonel: 2 yellow chevrons and 1 gold star on red background
- Major: 1 yellow chevrons and 1 gold star on red background

3. Company Grade level (4 ranks):

- Captain: 3 yellow chevrons on red background
- Lieutenant: 2 yellow chevrons on red background
- Second lieutenant: 1 yellow chevrons on red background
- Warrant-officer: yellow on red background

4. Non-Commissioned level (3 ranks):

- Sergeant major: (symbol) red on yellow background
- Sergeant: (symbol) red on yellow background
- Corporal: (symbol) red on yellow background

5. Enlisted level (2 ranks):

- Private 1st class: (symbol) red on light-yellow background
- Private: no rank insignia
General

Lieutenant General

Major General

Colonel

Lieutenant Colonel

Major

Captain

Lieutenant

Second lieutenant

Warrant officer

However, due to war conditions, the ranks system had not been applied, except for few exceptions. The rank system was changed to the current one in 1958, and several rank changes were made since their adoption.

== The adoption of the 1958 rank system and some changes ==
- 1958

With the official adoption of the armed forces rank system in 1958, the VPA has three levels of ranks: General Officers, Field Grade Officers, and Company Grade Officers, and each level has four steps are classified by number of stars: 4 stars, 3 stars, 2 stars and 1 star; Company Grade officers have one more rank, Warrant-officer (professional officer).

Below the Commissioned Officers level are the Non-Commissioned Officers level and Soldiers and Students levels. The non-commissioned level has 3 steps: Sergeant major, Sergeant and Corporal. There are two Private ranks: Private 1st class and Private. Until 1982 the Vietnam People's Navy used the same ranks as the rest of the armed forces.

- 1982

Senior Colonel rank was officially abolished.

The following naval ranks were officially adopted for flag-level officers of the Vietnam People's Navy: Admiral (equivalent to Colonel General), Vice Admiral (equivalent to Lieutenant General), and Rear Admiral (equivalent to Major General). With this change the English language translations of the Vietnamese ranks of the VPN after the 1982 flag officer rank introduction are as follows (with their equivalent land-based ranks in parentheses):

- Ensign (Junior Lieutenant)
- Lieutenant Junior Grade (Lieutenant)
- Lieutenant (Senior Lieutenant)
- Captain Lieutenant (Captain)
- Lieutenant Commander (Major)
- Commander (Lieutenant Colonel)
- Captain (Colonel)

Regulations on professional officer ranks were amended, and the ranks were formalised from being Officer Cadet/Warrant Officer (lowest) to Colonel/Captain (highest).

- 1992

The Senior Colonel rank was restored, and the Commodore rank was adopted in the VPN.

- 1996

Ranks of the Border Defence Force were formally decreed to use the same ones used by the Army with dark-green background and red piping. The shoulder boards of all officers, NCOs and enlisted personnel formally changed to their present design.

- 1998

Coast Guard ranks and ratings were defined with dark-purple and yellow background.

- 2008

New regulations on military rank insignias with some improvements were officially issued.

Professional officers also use the straight metal chevron but have a pink stripe running between the shoulderboards to differentiate.

General and flag officer's shoulderboards are woven with floating Dong Son drums and flamingos. Field Grade ranks have woven lines just like the old Generals' shoulderboards.

- 2010'

To mark the Millennium of Hanoi, the VPN debuted a new service sleeve rank insignia system for the officer corps, which includes the executive curl used in many countries. These are worn on the white or blue service uniform.

== Current official ranks ==
Ranks can show information about the branch of service of personnel within the PAVN. Color of the ranks reflect the service branch.

The Service shoulder colours are:

- Army: red
- Air Force: azure
- Navy: dark blue

Army-Air Force-Navy ranks have gold backgrounds for officers and a red stripe for staff officers.

Border Defence Force's ranks have background is dark-green and border colour is red.

The Coast Guard's ranks have background is blue and border colour is yellow.

== See also ==
- Vietnamese military ranks and insignia
