= Cyberspace Operations Command =

Cyberspace Operations Command (Vietnamese: Bộ Tư lệnh Tác chiến không gian mạng; abbreviated as Command 86) is a unit directly under the Ministry of National Defence of Vietnam, assisting the People's Army of Vietnam in performing its function of state management regarding the protection of national sovereignty in cyberspace and information technology.

== History ==
The Cyber Warfare Command was established on August 15, 2017 of the Prime Minister Nguyễn Xuân Phúc on the basis of upgrading from the Information Technology Department of the General Staff of the Vietnam People's Army. The announcement ceremony of the Decision to establish the 86th Command was held on January 8, 2018, in Hanoi. On March 30, 2018, the Cyber Warfare Command was transferred intact from the General Staff to the Ministry of National Defense. On July 24, 2018, the Cyber Operations Command held a ceremony to announce the decision to establish subordinate units.

- Brigade 1
- Brigade 2
- Brigade 3
- Testing Center
- Ministry of Defense Data Center
- Institute 10

== Current leadership ==
- Commander: Lieutenant General Vu Huu Hanh – Deputy Secretary of the Party Committee
- Political Commissar: Lieutenant General Nguyen Minh Thang – Secretary of the Party Committee
- Deputy Commander, Chief of Staff: Major General Nguyen Tien Giang
- Deputy Commander: Major General Nguyen Tung Hung
- Deputy Commander: Major General Vu Quoc Tien
- Deputy Political Commissar: Major General Le Ngoc Than

== Organization ==
=== Command Headquarters ===
- Office of the Command Headquarters
- Inspectorate of the Command Headquarters
- Inspection Committee of the Command
- Staff
  - Operations Room
  - Military Training Department
  - Military Personnel Department
  - Intelligence Department
  - Standards, Measurement and Quality Board
  - Information Department
  - Military Science Department
  - Administrative Board
- Political Bureau
  - Personnel Department
  - Organizational Department
  - Security Guard Department
  - Propaganda Department
  - General Planning Department
  - Policy and Mass Mobilization Department
- Logistics and Technical Department
  - Planning and Staff Department
  - Barracks Room
  - Supply Department
  - Fuel Depot
  - Vehicle and Machinery Room
  - Information Technology Technical Support Department
  - Ordnance Department
  - Military Medical Department
  - General Warehouse
- Finance Department
- KGM Safety Department
- Database Software Department

=== Subordinate units ===
- Center 186
- Center 286
- Center 386
- 486 Research Institute
- Center 586
- Testing Center
- Ministry of Defence Data Center
