= President Ho Chi Minh Mausoleum Protection Command =

Ceremonial guard unit in Hanoi, Vietnam

- Bộ Tư lệnh Bảo vệ Lăng Chủ tịch Hồ Chí Minh
- Insignia of the President Ho Chi Minh Mausoleum Defence Force
- Founded: 14 May 1976; 50 years ago
- Country: Vietnam
- Allegiance: Communist Party of Vietnam
- Role: Ceremonial guard
- Size: 1,000 personnel
- Part of: People's Army of Vietnam
- Nickname: Unit 969
- Anniversaries: 29 August 1975

Commanders
- Commander-in-Chief: General Secretary Tô Lâm
- Commander: Senior colonel Phạm Hải Trung
- Political Commissar: Major General Đinh Quốc Hùng
- Chief of Staff: Major General Tran Kinh Chi

The President Ho Chi Minh Mausoleum Protection Command (Vietnamese: Bộ Tư lệnh bảo vệ Lăng Chủ tịch Hồ Chí Minh), also known by its military designation Unit 969 (Đoàn 969) is the specialised force of the Vietnam People's Army tasked with protecting and providing ceremonial guards for the Ho Chi Minh Mausoleum. As a branch of the military, the force is under the executive administration of the Vietnam Ministry of National Defence.

Due to the mausoleum's large size, high number of visitors, the technical specifications for the preservation of Ho Chi Minh's body, need for security and need for propaganda work, on 28 December 1975, the Standing Committee of the Central Military Commission issued Decision No. 279/VP-QU approving the establishment of the Ho Chi Minh Mausoleum Protection Command. On 14 May 1976, the Ministry of National Defense issued Decision No. 109/QD-QP restructuring the command, placing it directly under the Ministry of National Defense.
