= Military ranks of South Korea =

The Military ranks of South Korea are the military insignia used by the Republic of Korea Armed Forces. Due to the close military cooperation and the presence of the United States Forces Korea, South Korean ranks are inspired by the United States.

== Current ranks ==
=== Commissioned officer ranks ===
The rank insignia of commissioned officers.

Rank group	General/flag officers					Field/senior officers			Junior officers
Hangul	원수	대장	중장	소장	준장	대령	중령	소령	대위	중위	소위
Hanja	元帥	大將	中將	少將	准將	大領	中領	少領	大尉	中尉	少尉
Romanization	Wonsu	Daejang	Jungjang	Sojang	Junjang	Daeryeong	Jungnyeong	Soryeong	Daewi	Jungwi	Sowi
Armed Forces
Republic of Korea Army
Republic of Korea Navy
Republic of Korea Marine Corps
Republic of Korea Air Force

==== Rank flags ====
Rank	Wonsu	Daejang	Jungjang	Sojang	Junjang
Army & marine corps					
Navy					
Air force					

=== Warrant officer ranks ===
All branches of the South Korean armed forces maintain a single warrant officer rank known as Junwi. This rank falls in between non-commissioned and commissioned officers. The rank is denoted by a gold-colored Sowi insignia and, in the case of the South Korean Navy, a single broken sleeve stripe.

Military Branch	Army	Navy	Marine Corps	Air Force
Hangul	준위
Hanja	准尉
Romanization	Junwi
Insignia

=== Other ranks ===
The rank insignia of non-commissioned officers and enlisted personnel.

Rank group	Non-commissioned officer				Enlisted
Hangul	원사	상사	중사	하사	병장	상등병	일등병	이등병
Hanja	元士	上士	中士	下士	兵長	上等兵	一等兵	二等兵
Romanization	Wonsa	Sangsa	Jungsa	Hasa	Byeongjang	Sangdeungbyeong	Ildeungbyeong	Ideungbyeong
Armed Forces
Republic of Korea Army
Republic of Korea Navy
Republic of Korea Marine Corps
Republic of Korea Air Force

== Historic ranks ==
=== Other ranks ===
Rank group	Non-commissioned officer	Enlisted
Republic of Korea Army (1954–1962)
Republic of Korea Army (1962–19??)

== See also ==
- Comparative military ranks of Korea
- Military ranks of North Korea
