= Military ranks of North Korea =

The Military ranks of North Korea are the military insignia used by the Korean People's Army. Due to the close military cooperation, North Korean ranks are inspired by the Soviet ranks system.

== Special ranks ==
North Korean rank	North Korean insignia
Grand Marshal of the Democratic People's Republic of Korea (Korean: 대원수, romanized: Tae wonsu) (Note: Highest possible political-military rank of North Korea and is intended to be an honorific title for the nation’s Great Leaders.)	
Marshal of the Democratic People's Republic of Korea (Korean: 공화국원수, romanized: Konghwaguk Wonsu) (Note: Highest political-military rank reserved only for Supreme Leader of North Korea.)	

== Commissioned officer ranks ==
The rank insignia of commissioned officers.

Rank group	General / flag officers						Senior officers				Junior officers
Korean People's Army Ground Force
Korean People's Army Ground Force	인민군원수; Inmingun-wonsu	차수; Chasu	대장; Daejang	상장; Sangjang	중장; Chungjang	소장; Sojang	대좌; Daechwa	상좌; Sangjwa	중좌; Chungjwa	소좌; Sojwa	대위; Taewi	상위; Sangwi	중위; Chungwi	소위; Sowi
Korean People's Navy
Korean People's Navy	인민군원수; Inmingun-wonsu	차수; Chasu	대장; Daejang	상장; Sangjang	중장; Chungjang	소장; Sojang	대좌; Daechwa	상좌; Sangjwa	중좌; Chungjwa	소좌; Sojwa	대위; Taewi	상위; Sangwi	중위; Chungwi	소위; Sowi
Navy sleeve
Korean People's Army Air Force
Korean People's Army Air Force	인민군원수; Inmingun-wonsu	차수; Chasu	대장; Daejang	상장; Sangjang	중장; Chungjang	소장; Sojang	대좌; Daechwa	상좌; Sangjwa	중좌; Chungjwa	소좌; Sojwa	대위; Taewi	상위; Sangwi	중위; Chungwi	소위; Sowi
Rank group	General / flag officers						Senior officers				Junior officers

== Other ranks ==
The rank insignia of non-commissioned officers and enlisted personnel.

Rank group	Senior NCOs					Junior NCOs		Enlisted
Korean People's Army Ground Force
Korean People's Army Ground Force	특무상사; T'ŭkmu-sangsa	상사; Sangsa	중사; Chungsa	하사; Hasa	상급병사; Sanggŭp-pyŏngsa	중급병사; Chungŭp-pyŏngsa	하급병사; Hagŭp-pyŏngsa	전사; Chŏnsa
Korean People's Navy
Korean People's Navy	특무상사; T'ŭkmu-sangsa	상사; Sangsa	중사; Chungsa	하사; Hasa	상급병사; Sanggŭp-pyŏngsa	중급병사; Chungŭp-pyŏngsa	하급병사; Hagŭp-pyŏngsa	전사; Chŏnsa
Korean People's Army Air Force
Korean People's Army Air Force	특무상사; T'ŭkmu-sangsa	상사; Sangsa	중사; Chungsa	하사; Hasa	상급병사; Sanggŭp-pyŏngsa	중급병사; Chungŭp-pyŏngsa	하급병사; Hagŭp-pyŏngsa	전사; Chŏnsa
Rank group	Senior NCOs					Junior NCOs		Enlisted

== See also ==
- Comparative military ranks of Korea
- Military ranks of South Korea
