= Comparative military ranks of Korea =

The comparative military ranks of Korea are the military insignia used by the two nations on the Korean Peninsula, those being the Republic of Korea Armed Forces (South Korea) and the Korean People's Army of the Democratic People's Republic of Korea (North Korea). The United States Forces Korea personnel wear the ranks and insignia used by other service personnel of the United States Armed Forces in the territories of the United States.

In the South Korean armed forces, ranks fall into one of four categories: commissioned officer, warrant officer, non-commissioned officer, and junior enlisted ("Byeong"), in decreasing order of authority. Commissioned officer ranks are subdivided into general officers ("Jangseong"; 장성/將星), field-grade officers ("Yeonggwan"; 영관/領官), and company-grade officers ("Wigwan"; 위관/尉官). The ranks of all three branches (the Army, Navy, and Air Force) of the South Korean Armed Forces share the same titles in Hangul. Most ranks of South and North Korea are identical, with some exceptions such as the supreme North Korean ranks.

While the North Korean ranks are inspired by the Soviet ranks, the South Korean ranks are inspired by the United States.

The following table lists the comparative ranks of the militaries in Korea, including their rank titles and insignia. In this table, the North Korean military rank insignia shown is that of their Army field uniform shoulder boards; their parade uniforms and uniforms of other branches use alternative color schemes with the same basic design. The South Korean likewise have subdued versions of their insignia in each of their branches.

== Special ranks ==
North Korean rank	North Korean insignia
Grand Marshal of the Democratic People's Republic of Korea (Korean: 대원수, romanized: Tae wonsu) (Note: Highest possible political-military rank of North Korea and is intended to be an honorific title for the nation's Great Leaders.)	
Marshal of the Democratic People's Republic of Korea (Korean: 공화국원수, romanized: Konghwaguk Wonsu) (Note: Highest political-military rank reserved only for Supreme Leader of North Korea.)	

== Officer ranks ==
The shoulder boards and sleeve stripes of South Korean ranks apply only to their navies. North Korea's People's Army does not maintain a separate marine corps or naval infantry branch as part of their armed forces, although it does maintain two "amphibious sniper brigades" as part of the North Korean Special Operation Force (NKSOF). North Korean insignia follow the Soviet pattern, while South Korean insignia follow a mix of American and British rank insignia traditions.

No one has held the five-star rank Wonsu in the history of the ROK Armed Forces.

=== Army ranks ===
Rank group	General / flag officers						Senior officers				Junior officers
Korean People's Army Ground Force
Korean People's Army Ground Force	인민군원수; Inmingun-wonsu	차수; Chasu	대장; Daejang	상장; Sangjang	중장; Chungjang	소장; Sojang	대좌; Daechwa	상좌; Sangjwa	중좌; Chungjwa	소좌; Sojwa	대위; Taewi	상위; Sangwi	중위; Chungwi	소위; Sowi
Republic of Korea Army
Republic of Korea Army	원수; Wonsu		대장; Daejang	중장; Jungjang	소장; Sojang	준장; Junjang	대령; Daeryeong		중령; Jungnyeong	소령; Soryeong	대위; Daewi	중위; Jungwi		소위; Sowi
Rank group	General / flag officers						Senior officers				Junior officers

All DPRK Marshals wear Ground Force uniform as there is no division of Branch after this rank.

=== Air force ranks ===
Rank group	General / flag officers						Senior officers				Junior officers
Korean People's Army Air Force
Korean People's Army Air Force	인민군원수; Inmingun-wonsu	차수; Chasu	대장; Daejang	상장; Sangjang	중장; Chungjang	소장; Sojang	대좌; Daechwa	상좌; Sangjwa	중좌; Chungjwa	소좌; Sojwa	대위; Taewi	상위; Sangwi	중위; Chungwi	소위; Sowi
Republic of Korea Air Force
Republic of Korea Air Force	원수; Wonsu		대장; Daejang	중장; Jungjang	소장; Sojang	준장; Junjang	대령; Daeryeong		중령; Jungnyeong	소령; Soryeong	대위; Daewi	중위; Jungwi		소위; Sowi
Rank group	General / flag officers						Senior officers				Junior officers

=== Naval ranks ===
ROK Navy commissioned officer ranks have two distinct sets of rank insignia: On dress uniform a series of stripes similar to the United States Navy naval ranks are worn; on service uniforms, working uniforms, and special uniform situations (combat utilities and flight suits), the rank insignia are the same as the equivalent rank in the Army or the Air Force.

Rank group	General / flag officers						Senior officers				Junior officers
Korean People's Navy
Korean People's Navy	인민군원수; Inmingun-wonsu	차수; Chasu	대장; Daejang	상장; Sangjang	중장; Chungjang	소장; Sojang	대좌; Daechwa	상좌; Sangjwa	중좌; Chungjwa	소좌; Sojwa	대위; Taewi	상위; Sangwi	중위; Chungwi	소위; Sowi
Republic of Korea Navy
Republic of Korea Navy	원수; Wonsu		대장; Daejang	중장; Jungjang	소장; Sojang	준장; Junjang	대령; Daeryeong		중령; Jungnyeong	소령; Soryeong	대위; Daewi	중위; Jungwi		소위; Sowi
Rank group	General / flag officers						Senior officers				Junior officers

=== Marine Corps ===
Rank group	General / flag officers				Senior officers			Junior officers
Republic of Korea Marine Corps
Republic of Korea Marine Corps	대장; Daejang	중장; Jungjang	소장; Sojang	준장; Junjang	대령; Daeryeong	중령; Jungnyeong	소령; Soryeong	대위; Daewi	중위; Jungwi	소위; Sowi
Rank group	General/flag officers				Senior officers			Junior officers

== Warrant officer ranks ==
All branches of the South Korean armed forces maintain a single Warrant Officer rank known as Junwi. Warrant Officers fall in between non-commissioned and commissioned officers. The rank is denoted by a gold-colored Sowi insignia and, in the case of the South Korean Navy, a single broken sleeve stripe. The North Korean military does not maintain any equivalent Warrant Officer positions.

Military Branch	Army	Navy	Marine Corps	Air Force
Insignia				
Rank title	준위 准尉; Junwi			

== Enlisted ranks ==
Both North Korea and South Korea share the same enlisted rank structure among all of their military branches. Enlisted rank insignia differ however: The ROKAF uses a mix of American, British, and French practice while the KPA's insignia follow Soviet practice.

In the South Korean armed forces, personnel with ranks of Hasa through Wonsa are considered non-commissioned officers. There are enlisted ranks called "Lance corporal", and "Corporal" in English, but they are not considered non-commissioned officer ranks, though they are treated as one if they hold an NCO position. Ideungbyeong (이등병; 2等兵, sometimes translated as private), Ildeungbyeong (일등병; 1等兵, sometimes translated as private first class), and Sangdeungbyeong (상등병; 上等兵, equivalent of a lance corporal) are commonly referred to as Ibyeong, Ilbyeong, and Sangbyeong respectively.

=== Army ranks ===
Rank group	Senior NCOs					Junior NCOs		Enlisted
Korean People's Army Ground Force
Korean People's Army Ground Force	특무상사; T'ŭkmu-sangsa	상사; Sangsa	중사; Chungsa	하사; Hasa	상급병사; Sanggŭp-pyŏngsa	중급병사; Chungŭp-pyŏngsa	하급병사; Hagŭp-pyŏngsa	전사; Chŏnsa
Republic of Korea Army
Republic of Korea Army	원사; Wonsa	상사; Sangsa	중사; Jungsa	하사; Hasa	병장; Byeongjang	상등병; Sangdeungbyeong	일등병; Ildeungbyeong	이등병; Ideungbyeong
Rank group	Senior NCOs					Junior NCOs		Enlisted

=== Air force ranks ===
Rank group	Senior NCOs					Junior NCOs		Enlisted
Korean People's Army Air Force
Korean People's Army Air Force	특무상사; T'ŭkmu-sangsa	상사; Sangsa	중사; Chungsa	하사; Hasa	상급병사; Sanggŭp-pyŏngsa	중급병사; Chungŭp-pyŏngsa	하급병사; Hagŭp-pyŏngsa	전사; Chŏnsa
Republic of Korea Air Force
Republic of Korea Air Force	원사; Wonsa	상사; Sangsa	중사; Jungsa	하사; Hasa	병장; Byeongjang	상등병; Sangdeungbyeong	일등병; Ildeungbyeong	이등병; Ideungbyeong
Rank group	Senior NCOs					Junior NCOs		Enlisted

=== Navy ranks ===
In reality, personnel in Sangsa and Wonsa rates are considered as chief petty officers (i.e. Chief Petty Officer and Master Chief Petty Officer, respectively) in the South Korean navy. Byeongjang and below are commonly referred to as "Subyeong" (seaman).

Rank group	Senior NCOs					Junior NCOs		Enlisted
Korean People's Navy
Korean People's Navy	특무상사; T'ŭkmu-sangsa	상사; Sangsa	중사; Chungsa	하사; Hasa	상급병사; Sanggŭp-pyŏngsa	중급병사; Chungŭp-pyŏngsa	하급병사; Hagŭp-pyŏngsa	전사; Chŏnsa
Republic of Korea Navy
Republic of Korea Navy	원사; Wonsa	상사; Sangsa	중사; Jungsa	하사; Hasa	병장; Byeongjang	상등병; Sangdeungbyeong	일등병; Ildeungbyeong	이등병; Ideungbyeong
Rank group	Senior NCOs					Junior NCOs		Enlisted

=== Marine Corps ===
Rank group	Senior NCOs					Junior NCOs		Enlisted
Republic of Korea Marine Corps
Republic of Korea Marine Corps	원사; Wonsa	상사; Sangsa	중사; Jungsa	하사; Hasa	병장; Byeongjang	상등병; Sangdeungbyeong	일등병; Ildeungbyeong	이등병; Ideungbyeong
Rank group	Senior NCOs					Junior NCOs		Enlisted

== See also ==
- Comparative military ranks
- Comparative army officer ranks of Asia

== Notes ==
In the article, all South Korean ranks are spelled accordingly with the Revised Romanization of Korean system; all North Korean ranks use the McCune–Reischauer system.
