= Bing (rank) =

Rank used in some East Asian militaries

Bing (Chinese: 兵; Korean: 병; Hanja: 兵) is the rank usually held by enlisted personnel in some East Asian militaries. The ranks are used in both the People's Republic of China and the Republic of China on Taiwan, and both North and South Korea. The rank name is based on one of the four ancient occupations.

== Etymology ==
The Sino-Korean word component "byeong" means "soldier" literally, used in a wide variety of words related with soldiers, like in busangbyeong (Korean: 부상병; Hanja: 負傷兵; lit. 'a wounded soldier'), but rarely (usually in technical context in armed forces) per se.

Byeongjangs who work closely with their US military counterparts are frequently addressed as "sergeant" or the equivalent E-5 term in English by the U.S. military. This varies however by unit. In a similar vein, some US E-5s are called hasa by the ROKA members, as their status is one of an NCO.

== History ==
The various ranks of byeong are denoted by stripes worn laterally on a service member's left sleeve. An even lower rank, that of mudeungbyeong (무등병; 無等兵; lit. 'soldier with no rank'), also known as hullyeonbyeong (훈련병; 訓鍊兵; lit. 'trainee soldier'), is usually believed to be held by enlisted recruits in basic training, and those recruits are not allowed to have any insignia on their uniform until they finish the training course, but they are actually regarded to be ideungbyeong (the lowest byeong rank) officially.

In most comparative military scales, a byeongjang is considered the equivalent of a non-commissioned officer equal to a sergeant. The South Korean military, however, does not generally grant NCO powers to a service member until obtaining the rank of hasa. Still, byeongjang in South Korea is exceptionally considered as an NCO when holding the squad leader position.

The word byeong (soldier) has a natural context that personnel in those ranks are not in commanding responsibilities, thus not NCOs at all. They are strictly distinguished from the ranks above in many respects. Personnel with ranks of hasa or above are called ganbu (간부; 幹部; lit. 'the executive members'), as an antonym of byeong. South Korea's South Korean military are retained by the conscription system. If a person is enlisted to an armed force and has not applied for NCO or officer, then his highest rank until he finishes the mandatory service term (21 months in case of the ROK Army, as of 2012) is to be the highest rank of byeong (i.e. byeongjang).

== Chinese variant ==
=== People's Republic of China ===
The same rank names are used for all services, prefixed by haijun (simplified Chinese: 海军; traditional Chinese: 海軍; lit. 'naval force') or kongjun (simplified Chinese: 空军; traditional Chinese: 空軍; lit. 'air force').

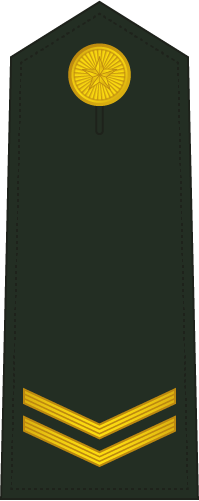
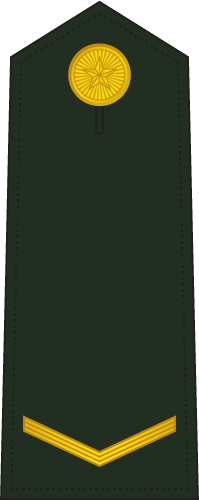
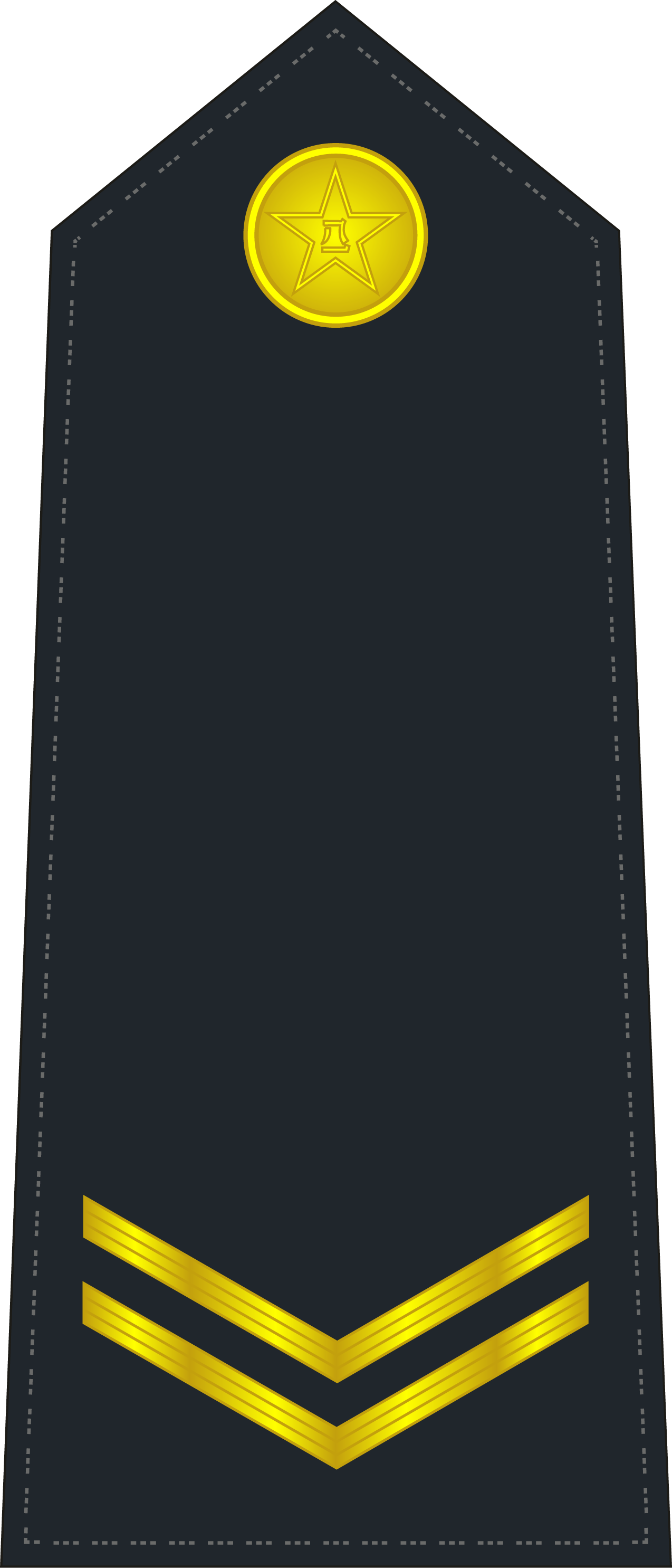
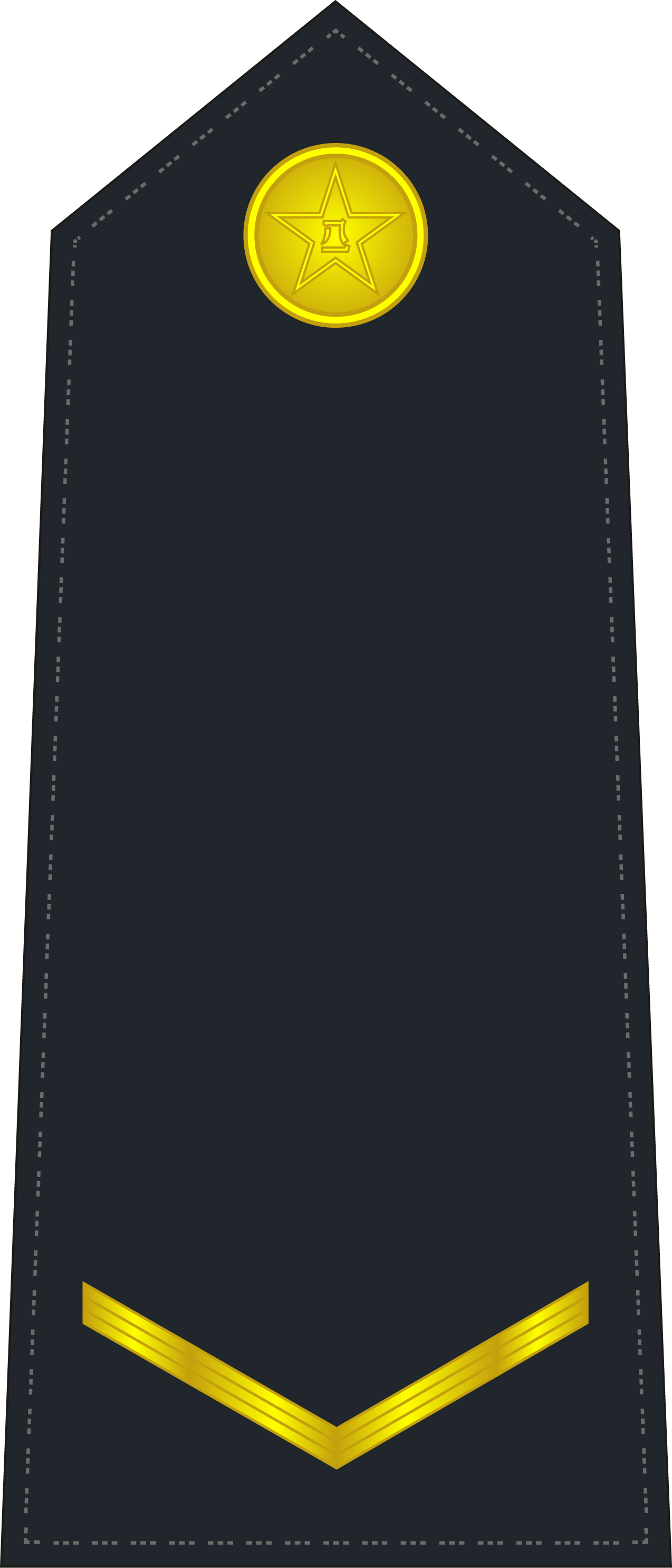
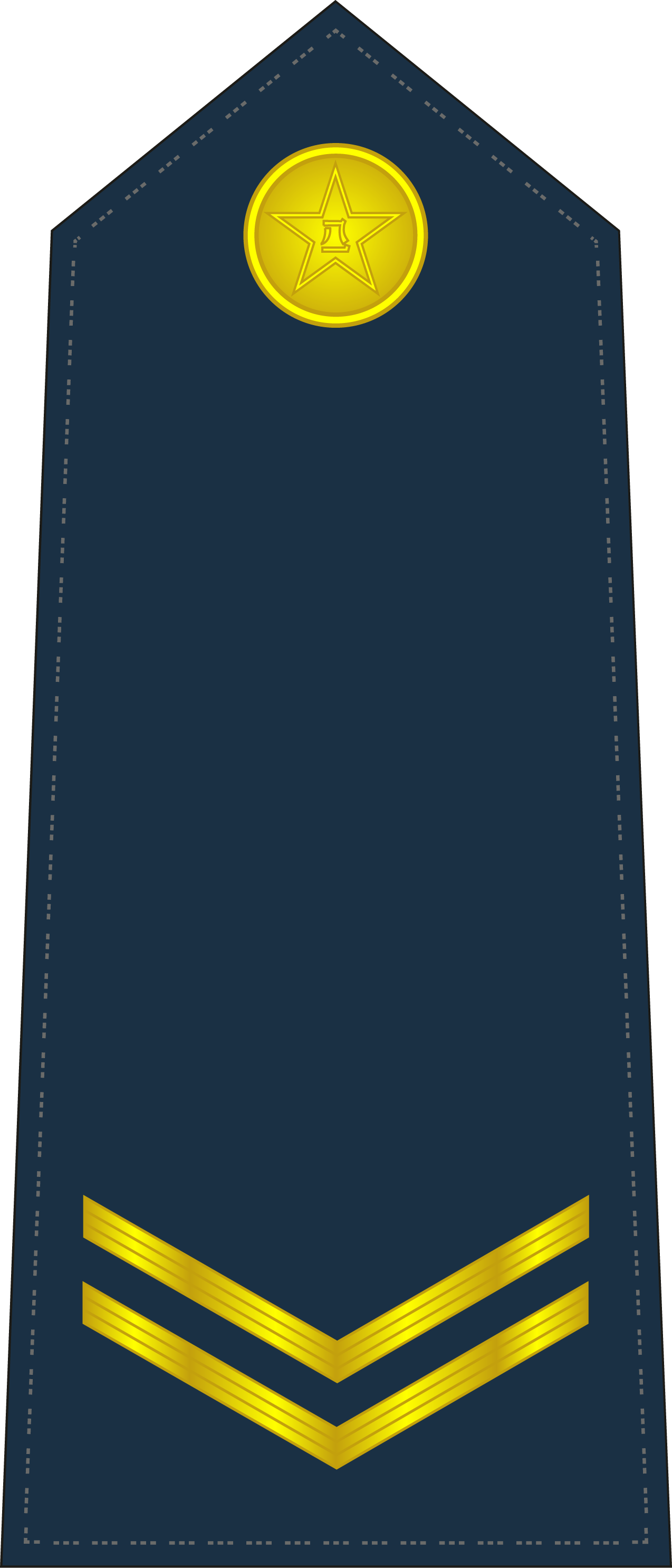
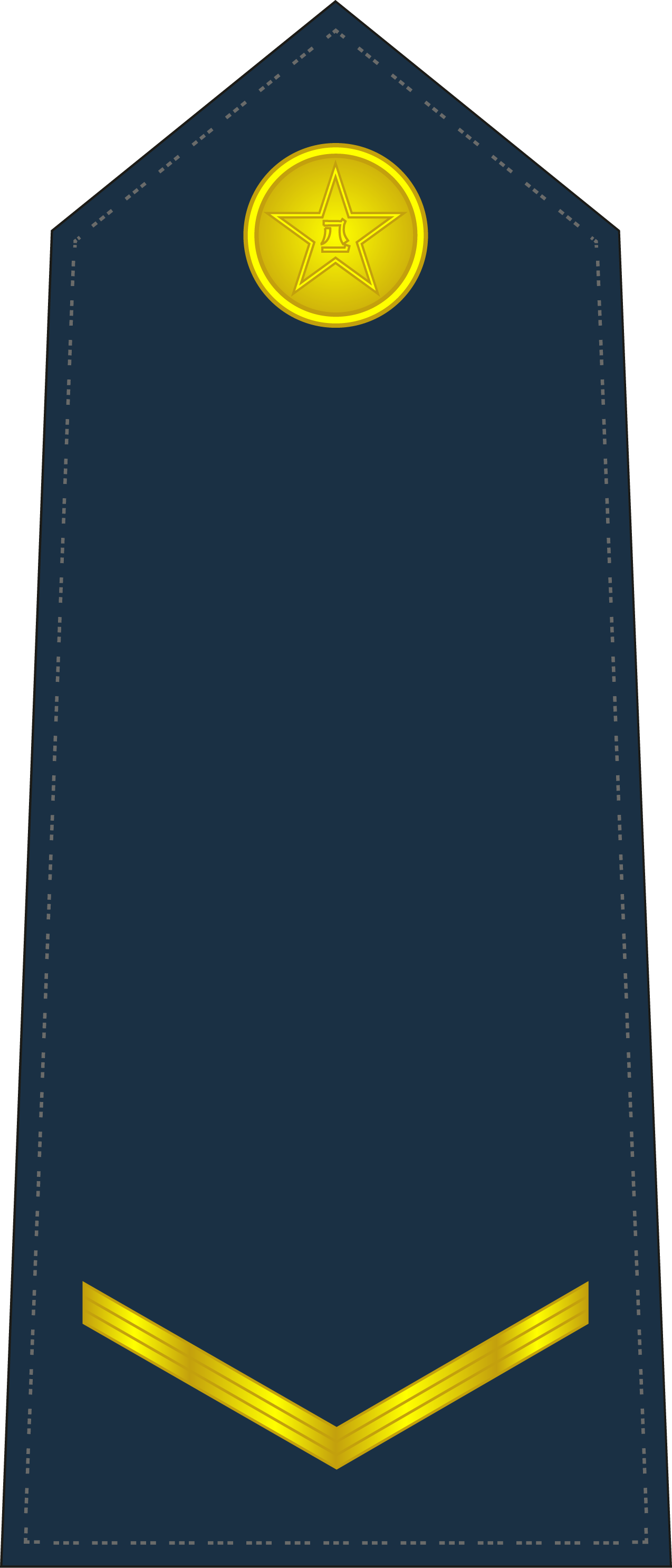
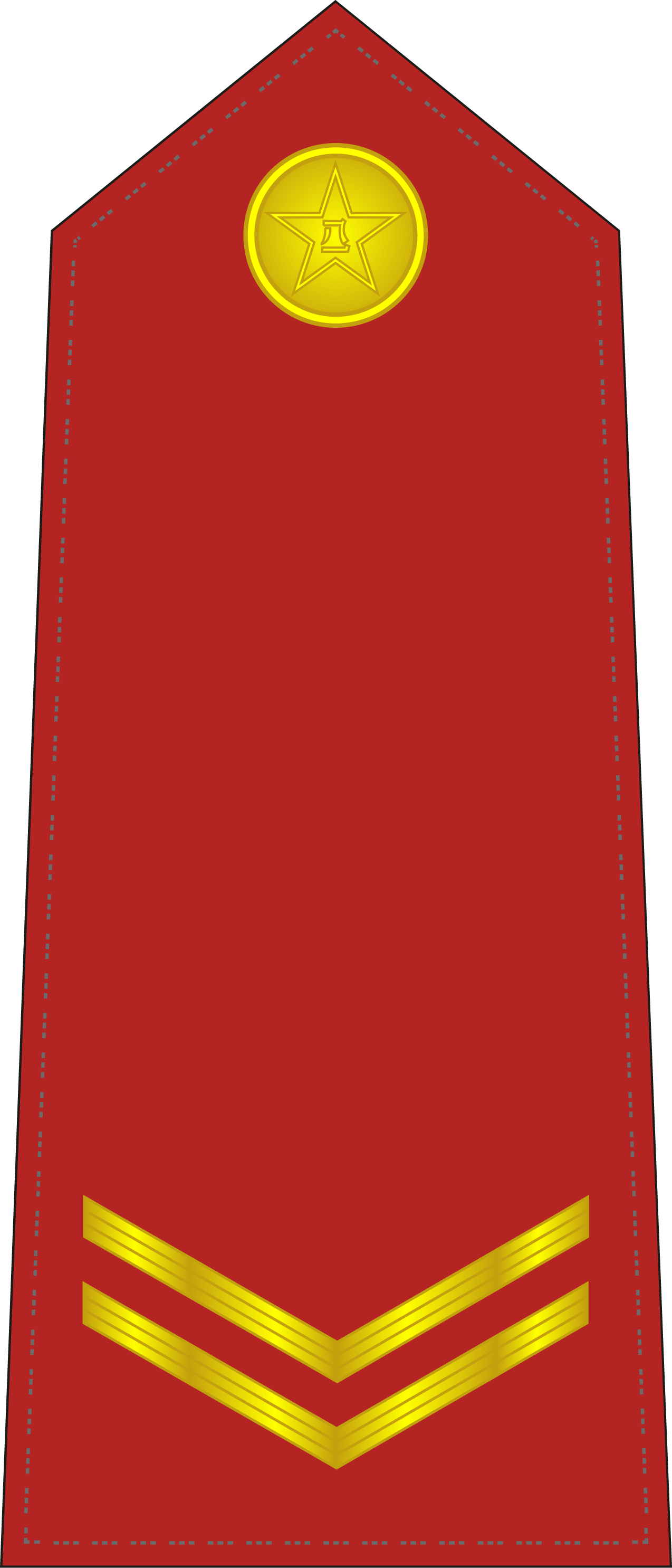
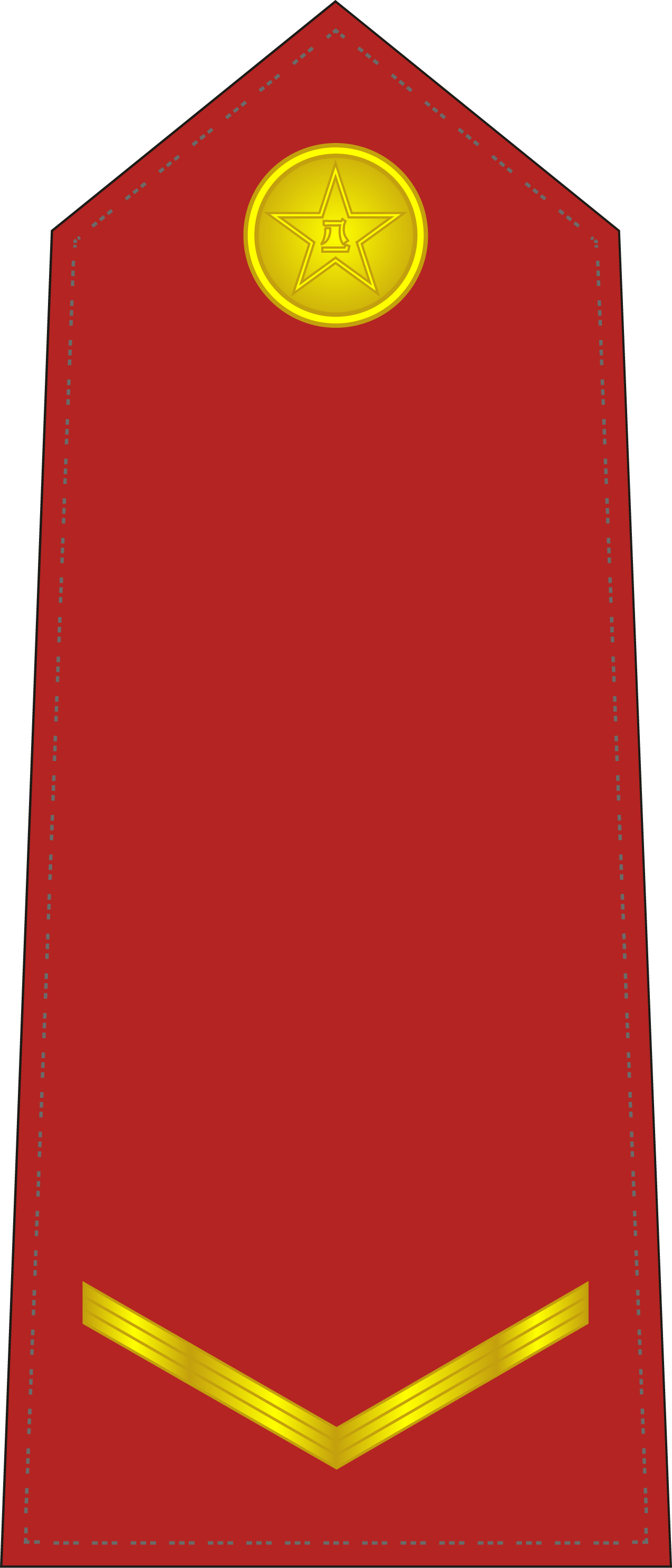
Rank group	Enlisted
Chinese	上等兵	列兵
Pinyin	Shàngděngbīng	Lièbīng
Literal translation	Upper class soldier	Line soldier
PLA Ground Force (Note: Same insignia for the Rocket Force, Aerospace Force, and Cyberspace Force.)
PLA Navy
PLA Air Force
People's Armed Police
	上等兵; Shàngděngbīng	列兵; Lièbīng
Rank group	Enlisted

=== Republic of China ===
Rank group	Enlisted
Rank	上等兵	一等兵	二等兵
Mandarin	Shàngděngbīng	Yīděngbīng	Èrděngbīng
Taiwanese	Siōng-téng Peng	It-téng Peng	Jī-téng Peng
Literal translation	Upper class soldier	First class soldier	Second class soldier
Republic of China Army
Republic of China Navy
Republic of China Air Force
Republic of China Marine Corps
Republic of China Military Police
	上等兵; Shàngděngbīng	一等兵; Yīděngbīng	二等兵; Èrděngbīng
Rank group	Enlisted

== South Korean variant ==
- Bing
- Hangul: 병
- Hanja: 兵
- RR: byeong
- MR: pyŏng

Rank group	Enlisted
Hangul	병장	상등병	일등병	이등병
Hanja	兵長	上等兵	一等兵	二等兵
Romanization	Byeongjang	Sangdeungbyeong	Ildeungbyeong	Ideungbyeong
Literal translation	Soldier chief	Superior soldier	First class soldier	Second class soldier
Republic of Korea Army
Official translation	Sergeant	Corporal	Private first class	Private
Republic of Korea Navy
Official translation	Petty officer second class	Petty officer third class	Seaman	Seaman apprentice
Republic of Korea Air Force
Republic of Korea Marine Corps
	병장 兵長; Byeongjang	상등병 上等兵; Sangdeungbyeong	일등병 一等兵; Ildeungbyeong	이등병 二等兵; Ideungbyeong
Rank group	Enlisted

=== Mudeungbyeong ===
- Bing
- Hangul: 무등병
- Hanja: 無等兵
- RR: mudeungbyeong
- MR: mudŭngbyŏng

Mudeungbyeong (literally "rank-less soldier") is a term describing the lowest possible military rank in the armed forces of South Korea. It is the combined equivalent of an army recruit or seaman recruit in other militaries of the world. The official name is jangjeong (장정), which refers to enlistees before they have been assigned a rank. A jangjeong wears no insignia and the rank is typically only held by those attending initial basic training. The term hullyeonbyeong (훈련병), meaning "trainee," is also sometimes used for those still in boot camp. The North Korean Korean People's Army does not maintain an equivalent position.

== Vietnamese variant ==
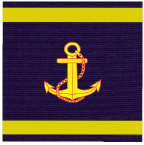
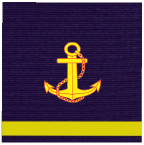
Rank group	Enlisted
Vietnamese	Binh nhất	Binh nhì
Chữ Hán	兵一	兵二
Literal translation	First soldier	Second soldier
Vietnam People's Ground Force (Note: Same insignia for the Mausoleum Command.)
Vietnam People's Navy
Navy sailor suit
Vietnam People's Air Force
Vietnam Border Guard
Vietnam Coast Guard
Vietnamese	Binh nhất	Binh nhì
Rank group	Enlisted

=== South Vietnamese variant ===
Rank group	Enlisted
Native name	Binh nhất	Binh nhì
Chữ Hán	兵一	兵二
Literal translation	First soldier	Second soldier
Army of the Republic of Vietnam (1967–1975)		No insignia
Translation	Private first class	Private
Republic of Vietnam Navy (1967–1975)		No insignia
Translation	Seaman	Recruit
Republic of Vietnam Marine Division (1967–1975)		No insignia
Translation	Private first class	Private
Republic of Vietnam Air Force (1967–1975)
Translation	Airman first class	Airman
Native name	Binh nhất	Binh nhì
Rank group	Enlisted

== See also ==
Ranks used in Chinese character-using countries

- General officer: Jiang (rank)
- Senior officer: Sa (rank), Xiao (rank), Lyeong
- Junior officer: Wei (rank)
- Non-commissioned officers: Shi (rank)
- Enlisted ranks: Bing (rank), Shi (rank)
