= Lyeong =

South Korean military rank

- Hangul: 령
- Hanja: 領
- RR: ryeong
- MR: ryŏng

Lyeong is the senior officers rank group used by the South Korean military. The ranks are below Jang and above wi. The equal rank group in North Korea is jwa.

== Insignia ==
Rank group	Senior officers
Hangul	대령	중령	소령
Hanja	大領	中領	少領
Romanization	Daeryeong	Jungnyeong	Soryeong
Literal translation	Upper leader	Middle leader	Small leader
Armed Forces
Republic of Korea Army
Republic of Korea Navy
Republic of Korea Marine Corps
Republic of Korea Air Force

== See also ==
Ranks used in Chinese character-using countries

- General officer: Jiang (rank)
- Senior officer: Sa (rank), Xiao (rank), Lyeong
- Junior officer: Wei (rank)
- Non-commissioned officers: Shi (rank)
- Enlisted ranks: Bing (rank), Shi (rank)
