= Republic of Korea Army =

Land branch of the South Korean military

- 대한민국 육군
- Seal of the Republic of Korea Army
- Founded: September 5, 1948; 78 years ago
- Country: South Korea
- Type: Army
- Role: Land warfare
- Size: 400,000 personnel (2025)
- Part of: Republic of Korea Armed Forces
- Garrison/HQ: Gyeryong, South Chungcheong, South Korea
- Nicknames: "ROK Army", "ROKA", "South Korean Army"
- Mottos: 강한친구 대한민국 육군 ("A Strong Friend, Republic of Korea Army")
- March: 육군가 ("Army Anthem")
- Mascot: 호국이 (Hogugi)
- Website: army.mil.kr

Commanders
- President: Lee Jae-Myung
- Minister of National Defense: Kang Shin-chul
- Chief of Staff of the Army: General Kim Kyu-ha
- Vice Chief of Staff of the Army: General Ko Hyun Seok

Insignia
- Flag

Korean name
- Hangul: 대한민국 육군
- Hanja: 大韓民國陸軍
- RR: Daehanminguk yukgun
- MR: Taehanmin'guk yukkun

The Republic of Korea Army (ROKA; Korean: 대한민국 육군), also known as the ROK Army or South Korean Army, is the ground warfare branch of the Republic of Korea Armed Forces. It is the largest of the military branches of the South Korean military with 400,000 members as of 2025, a size maintained through conscription. All able-bodied South Korean males are required to complete military service, with the army requiring 18 months of military service between the ages of 18 and 35.

The ROKA traces its lineage to the Gwangmu Reform, with its modern form emerging in 1945 as the Korean Constabulary, a force initially heavily influenced by Imperial Japanese Army doctrine and former personnel as many founding officers and servicemen had served during the Second World War, a legacy that remains controversial in South Korea today.

Caught unprepared by rapid offensives by North Korean forces at the outbreak of the Korean War, ROKA forces were pushed to the brink of defeat, with most divisions (5 out of 8 divisions) overrun and destroyed in the opening acts of the war. After United Nations intervention stabilized the front in a final stand at the port city of Busan, the United States focused on rebuilding shattered ROKA divisions through intensive training and equipment. By the war's end the ROKA had grown into a significantly more capable force, going on to deploy roughly 320,000 combat troops to Vietnam and later seeing combat operations alongside coalition forces in the Gulf War, Iraq, and Afghanistan.

Today the army fields 400,000 troops, 2,838 tanks, and 9,300 artillery pieces across two field armies, six corps, and 34 divisions.

== History ==
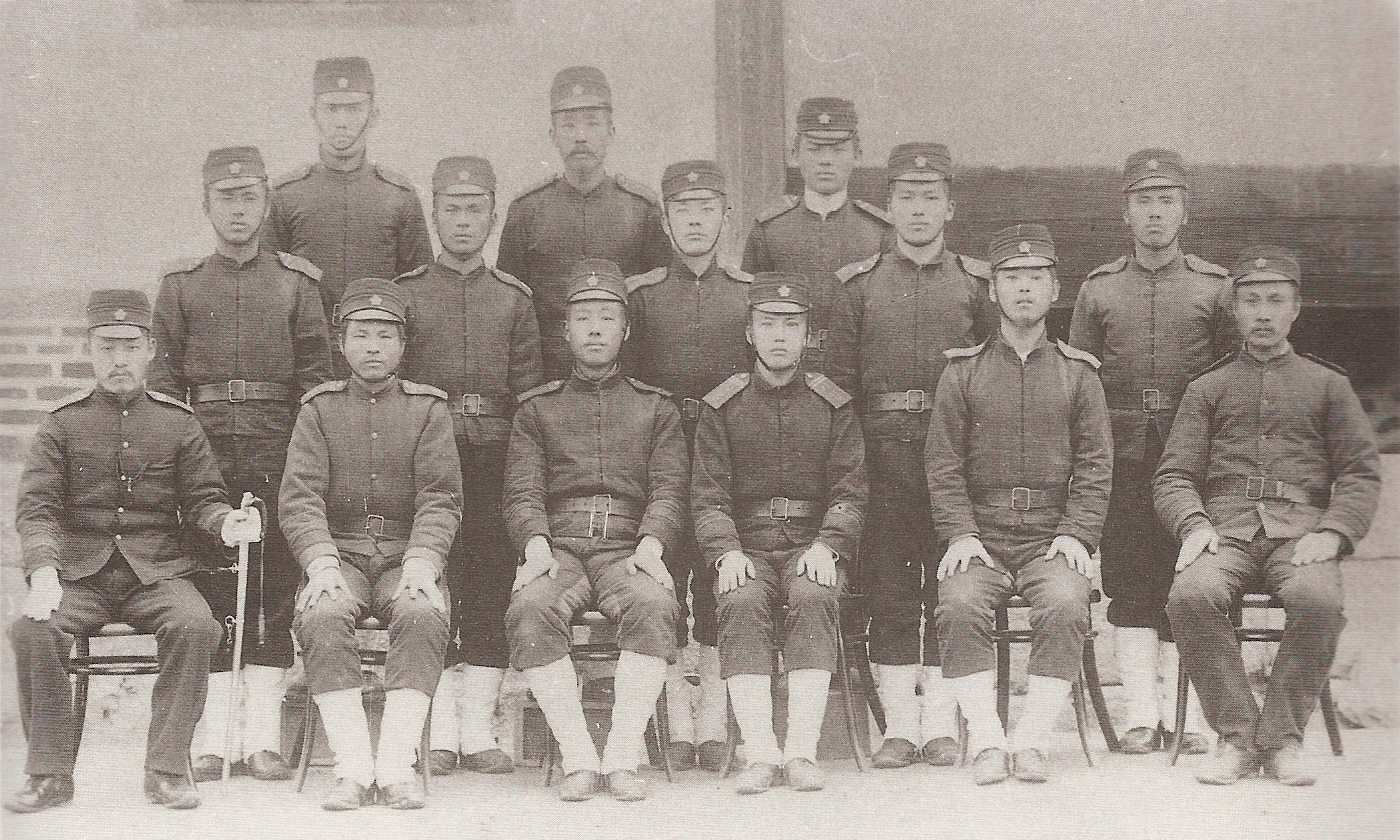
Soldiers of the Imperial Korean Army in 1898

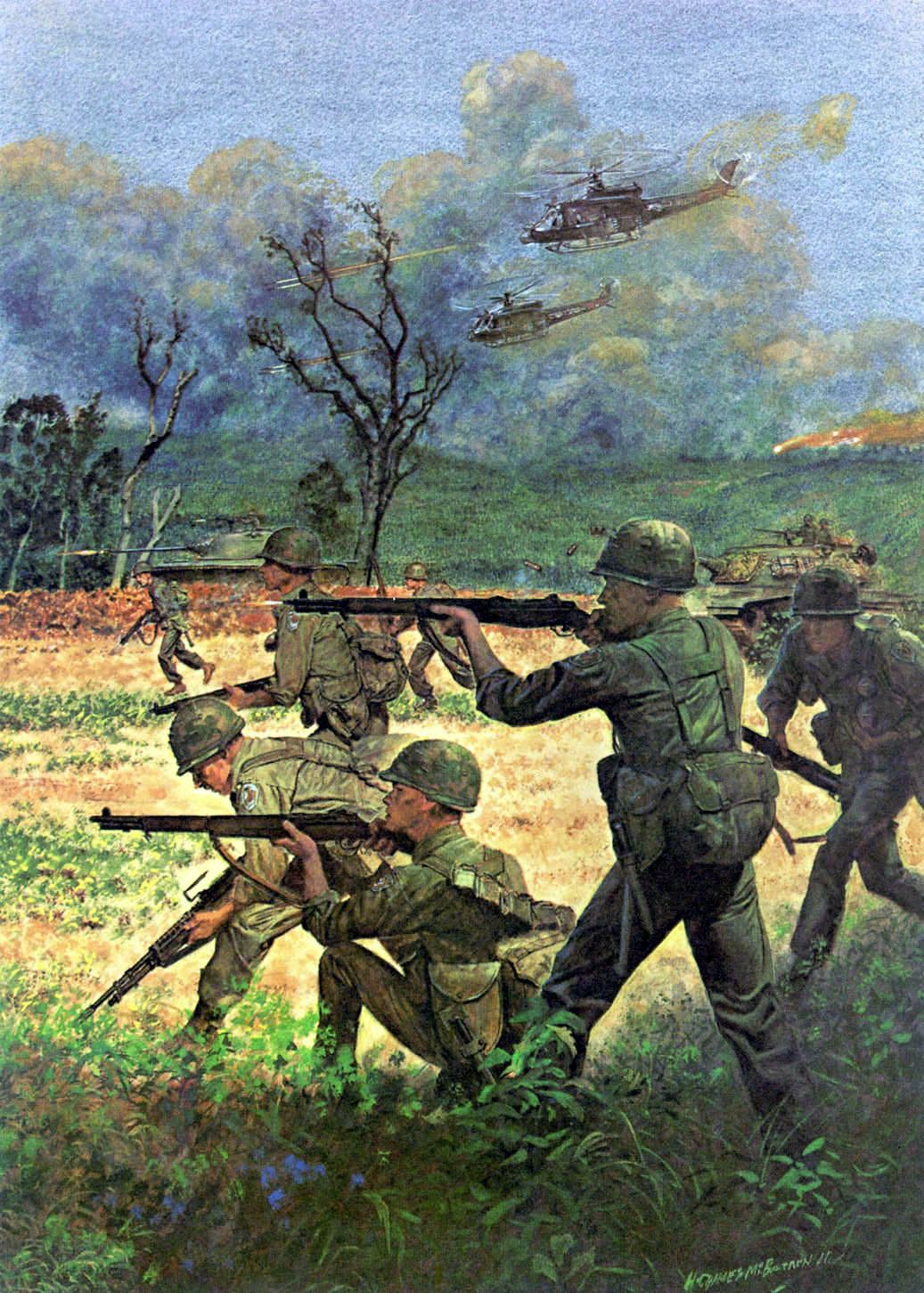
US Army drawing showing ROKA soldiers fighting in the Vietnam War, 1966

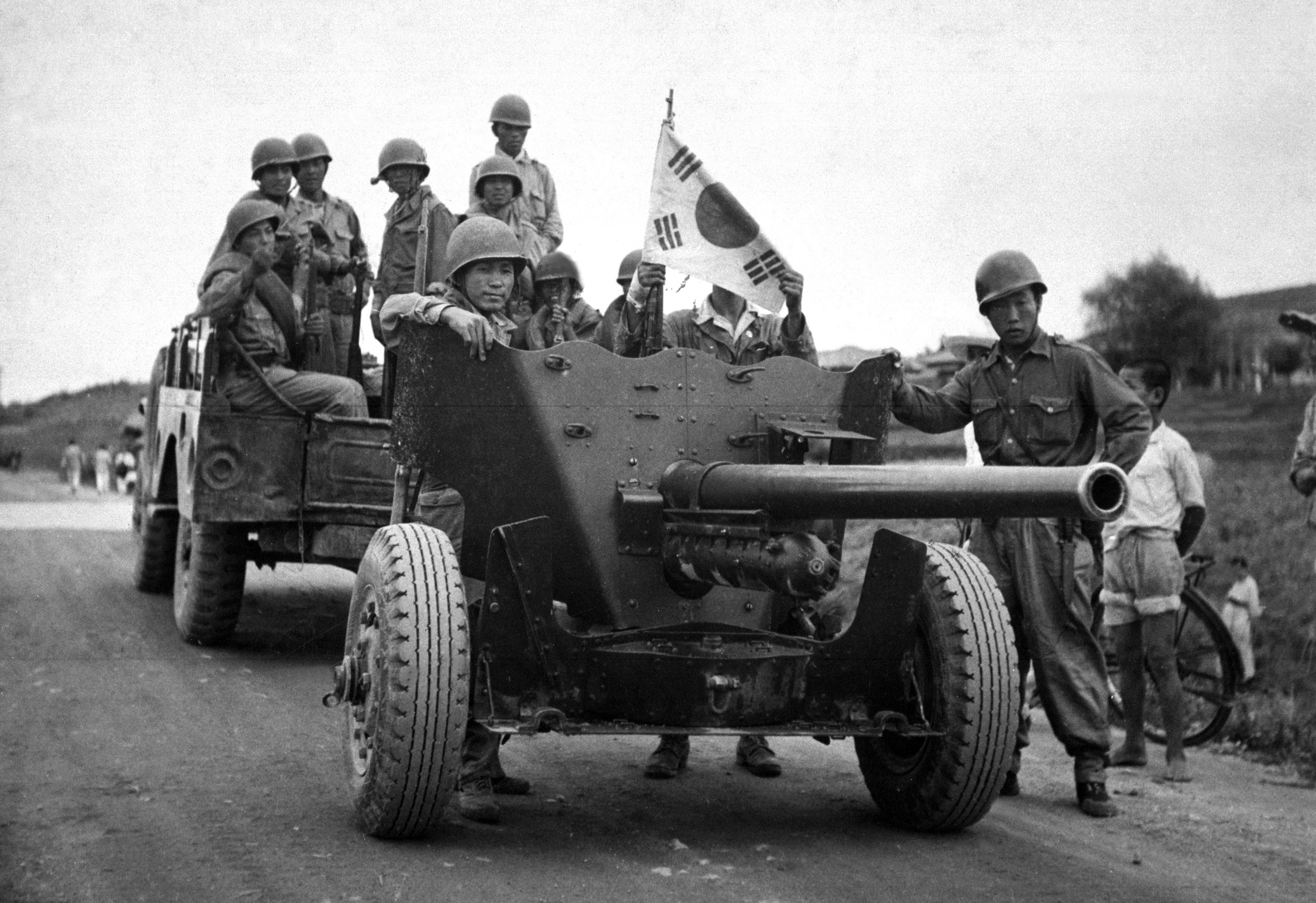
ROKA soldiers with a 57 mm anti-tank gun during the Korean War, 1950

The Republic of Korea Army traces its lineage back to the Gwangmu Reform, when the Pyŏlgigun was established by Emperor Gojong in 1881 during Korean Empire period.

The 1st of every October is celebrated in South Korea as Armed Forces Day. It commemorates the day during the Korean War when 3rd Infantry Division of the ROK Army first crossed the 38th Parallel, thus leading the UN coalition into North Korean territory for the first time.

The National Security Guard of South Korea (Korean: 남조선국방경비대; Hanja: 南朝鮮國防警備隊), also called the Korean Constabulary (Korean: 조선경비대; Hanja: 朝鮮警備隊), was the nucleus of the ROK Army. This organization was created during the USAMGIK period from 1945 to 1948. The National Security Guard was initially a reserve unit of the National Police. In addition, some former soldiers of the Manchukuo Imperial Army also contributed to the force. The National Defense Force was established on January 15, 1946, replacing the United States lead constabulary from 1945.

The outbreak of the Korean War caught the ROK forces unprepared, requiring the United Nations to intervene with US-led forces. The South Korean military rapidly developed during the Korean War, suffering several casualties and loss of equipment. As the Soviets had armed North Korea, the United States armed and trained the South Korean military throughout the Korean War.

=== Current operational status ===
The Republic of Korea Army is structured to operate in both the mountainous terrain native to the Korean Peninsula (70% mountainous) and in North Korea with its 950,000 strong Korean People's Army Ground Force, two-thirds of which is permanently garrisoned in the frontline near the DMZ. The current administration has initiated a program over the next two decades to design a purely domestic means of self-defense, whereby South Korea would be able to fully counter a North Korean attack.

The ROK Army was formerly organized into 3 armies: the First Army (FROKA), the Third Army (TROKA), and the Second Operational Command, each with its own headquarters, corps, and divisions. The Third Army was responsible for the defense of the capital as well as the western section of the DMZ. The First Army was responsible for the defense of the eastern section of the DMZ whereas the Second Operational Command formed the rearguard.

Under a restructuring plan aimed at reducing redundancy, the Second ROK Army was converted into the Second Operations Command in 2007, and the First and Third ROK Armies were merged as the Ground Operations Command in 2019.

== Equipment ==
The army consists of 400,000 troops, approximately 2,838 tanks, 131,000 armoured fighting vehicles, 9,300 artillery pieces, 2,000 multiple rocket launchers, and 982 helicopters as of 2025. Main battle tank types include: 400 M48 Patton series and its upgrades such as the M48A3K, M48A5, and M48A5K, 33 Soviet T-80U and 2 T-80UK (given by Russia to pay off debt and used in "aggressor" training and test purposes), as well as 1,511 K1A1 and K1 tanks, which bear a 120mm smoothbore gun and are of local manufacture. The future replacement for the K1 and K1A1 MBTs has been named the K2 Black Panther (흑표;黑豹 Heukpyo), which will be fitted with a 1500 hp MTU-based engine, 55-caliber 120mm main gun with autoloader. The new tank will also feature radar equipment as well as all-bearing laser detection and defense systems, anti-missile active protection, and heavy reactive armor and sensor package comparable to the American M1A2 Abrams and the German Leopard 2A6. The ROK Army is planning to field approximately 443 Black Panthers.

In addition, the Republic of Korea manufactures the K-9 howitzer which has been exported to Turkey as the T-155 howitzer as well as the ZMA series TIFV's which saw action in United Nations peacekeeping operations (PKO) as part of the Malaysian peacekeeping forces. A variation of the K200, the KAFVs can be retrofitted to bear a 90mm cannon, 40 mm grenade turret, M230-1 Chaingun Turret, or MK-30 Chaingun Turret. A replacement for the K200 series IFVs are currently being tested, designated as the K21 KNIFV (Korea Next Generation Infantry Fighting Vehicle), which will have various capabilities for both land and naval warfare. The initial production is set for 2008, with the ROK Army planning to field approximately 600 units.

The K21 KNIFV's chassis will be constructed entirely out of fiberglass, reducing the vehicle's load and enabling it to travel at higher speeds without bulky and powerful engines. When constructed, the NIFV will be lighter than other IFVs, including the American Bradley series and Russian BMP series, increasing both speed and payload.

The ROK Army also fields the mobile K-SAM "Pegasus" (천마/天馬; Cheonma), fitted with 8 missiles that fly at maximum speeds of Mach 2.6, and the K-30 "Biho" series, which features a 30mm twin gun system for anti-aerial fire support.

Besides having vehicles and equipment of their own design as well as American models, the ROK Army also possesses inventories of Russian-built AFVs, including BMP-3 IFVs and T-80U MBTs, given by the Russian government to pay off the financial debt owed to South Korea. Other notable foreign equipment in service with the ROK Army includes the Mistral MANPADS.

In 2015, it was reported by South Korean lawmakers that more than 58,000 out of 100,549 South Korean soldiers at the Korean Demilitarized Zone lacked body armor capable of protection from North Korean firearms. The possession of only 42,030 body armor sets leaves 58,519 soldiers without body armor, and only 3,147 of the 42,030 sets are capable of protection from the AK-74, the standard assault rifle of the Korean People's Army.

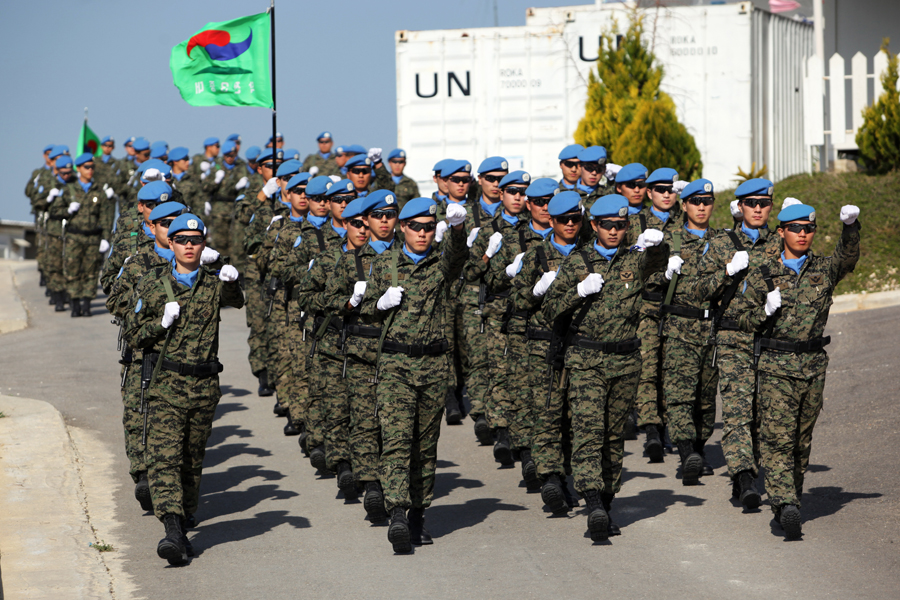
South Korean troops serving with UNIFIL in Lebanon in 2011

A new infantry rifle, the Daewoo K11, entered service in 2010. The overall concept of this weapon is more advanced to the American OICW, however its production has been halted and weapon discontinued in 2020 due to excessive issues involving its targeting component and the quality of ammunition, to focus on fixing the issues which have been quickly resolved. Inspection of military equipment in June 2021 found that 26% of components involving the Warrior Platform program for modernization of South Korean infantry is defective.

== Organization ==
On 1 December 2020, all subordinate regiments of each divisions in the Republic of Korea Army reorganized into brigades.

As of July 2023, the Republic of Korea Army has 2 field armies, 6 corps, and 34 divisions.

== Ranks ==
In officer ranks, "So" (少) equals lower; "Jung" (中) equals medium; "Dae" (大) equals higher. "Jun" (准) equals equivalent, used for warrant officer and 1 star generals to ensure that they are regarded as officers/generals, although these ranks are lower than the same grade with "So" rank. "Wo" (元) equals principal, only used for Won-Su, General of the Army. Each of these is coupled with one of the following: "wi" (尉) equals company grade, "ryung" (領) equals field grade, and "jang" (將) equals general.

NCO rank is similar to officer. "Ha" (下) equals lower; "Jung" (中) equals medium; "Sang" (上) equals higher; "Won" (元) equals principal, because this title is named after Won-Su, to ensure that this rank is higher than Sang-sa. Each of these is coupled with "Sa" (士) equals sergeant, although actual 'sergeant' rank is "Byeong-jang".

This system is due to the Hanja or Sino-Korean origin of the names.

Commissioned officer ranks

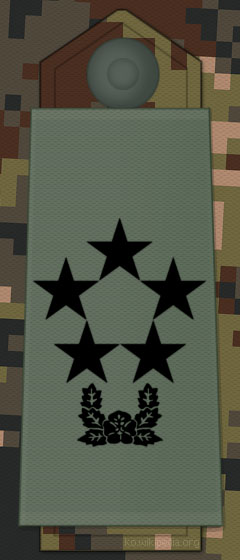
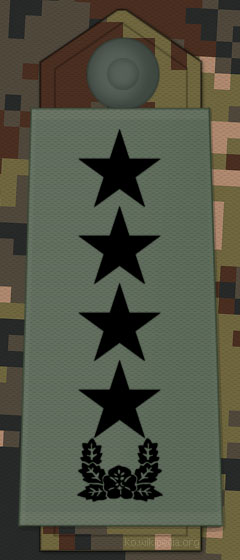
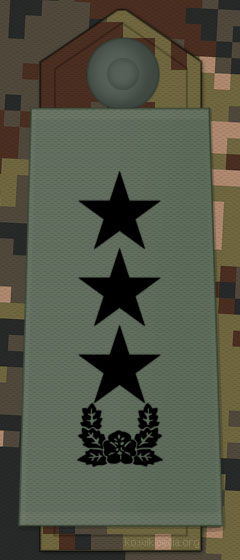
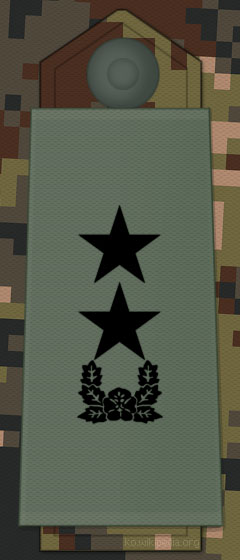
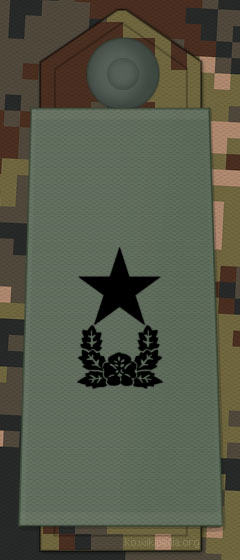
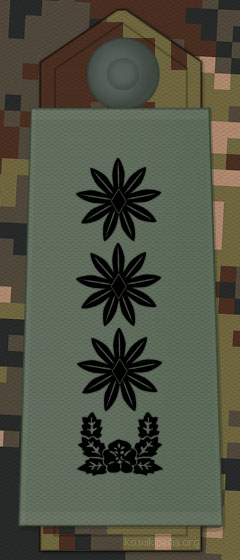
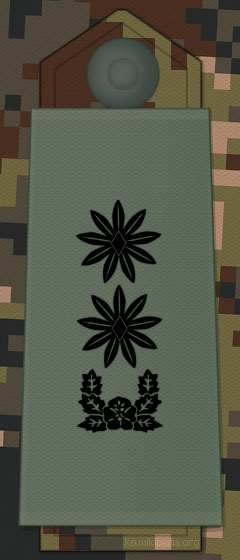
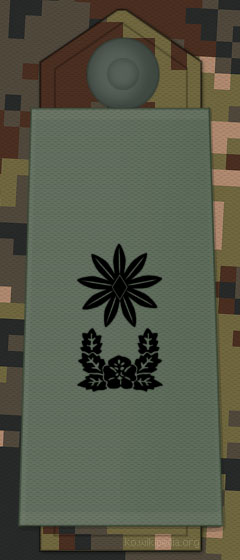
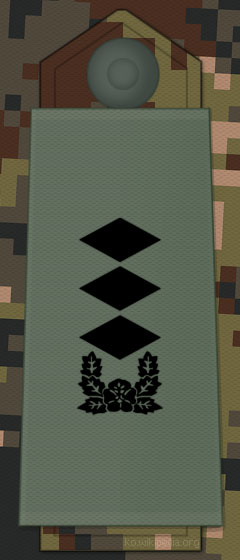
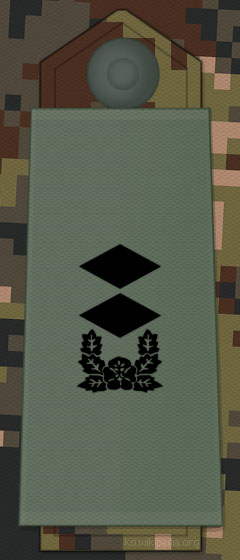
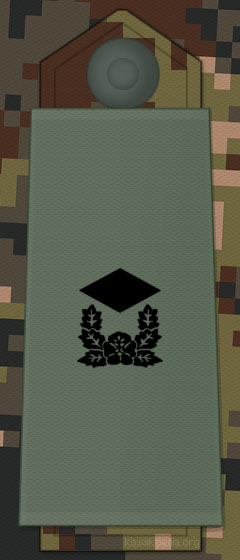
Rank group	General officer					Field officer			Junior officer
Combat uniform
Republic of Korea Army
Republic of Korea Army	원수; Wonsu	대장; Daejang	중장; Jungjang	소장; Sojang	준장; Junjang	대령; Daeryeong	중령; Jungnyeong	소령; Soryeong	대위; Daewi	중위; Jungwi	소위; Sowi

Warrant officer ranks

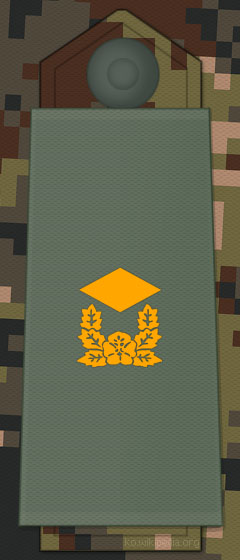
Rank group	Warrant officer
Combat uniform
Republic of Korea Army
Republic of Korea Army	준위; Junwi

Other ranks

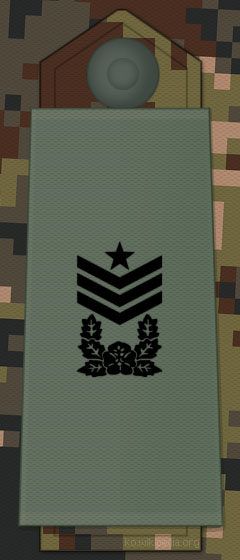
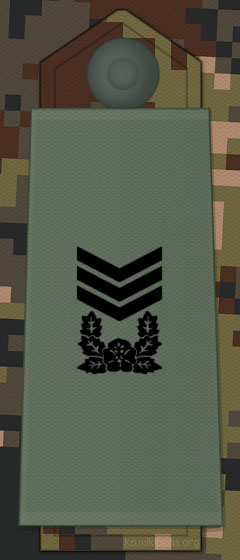
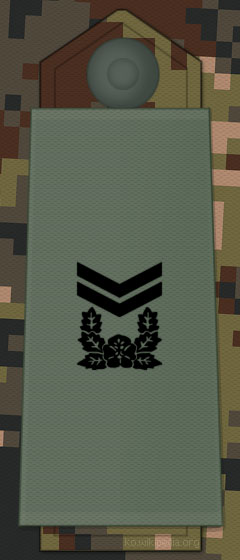
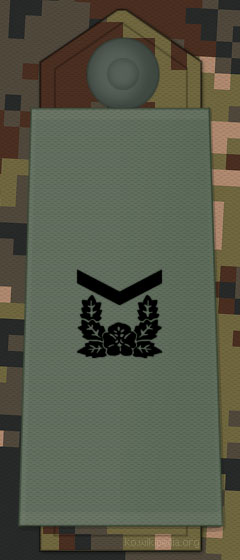
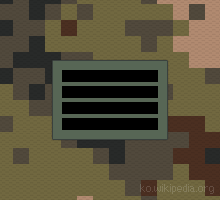
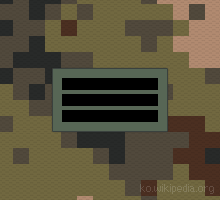
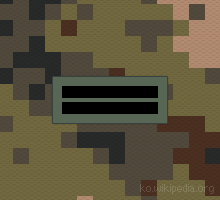
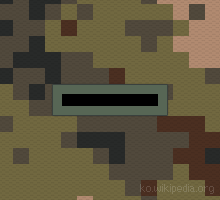
Rank group	Non-commissioned officer				Enlisted
Combat uniform
Republic of Korea Army
Republic of Korea Army	원사; Wonsa	상사; Sangsa	중사; Jungsa	하사; Hasa	병장; Byeongjang	상등병; Sangdeungbyeong	일등병; Ildeungbyeong	이등병; Ideungbyeong

== See also ==
- Republic of Korea Armed Forces
- Korean People's Army Ground Force
- KATUSA
- Korean War
