= Shi (rank) =

Rank in some East Asian militaries

Shi (Chinese: 士; Korean: 사; Hanja: 士) is the rank usually held by Non-commissioned officers in some East Asian militaries. The ranks are used in both the People's Republic of China and Taiwan, and both North and South Korea. The rank name is based on the on one of the four ancient occupations.

== China ==
The same rank names are used for all services, prefixed by haijun (simplified Chinese: 海军; traditional Chinese: 海軍; lit. 'naval force') or kongjun (simplified Chinese: 空军; traditional Chinese: 空軍; lit. 'air force').

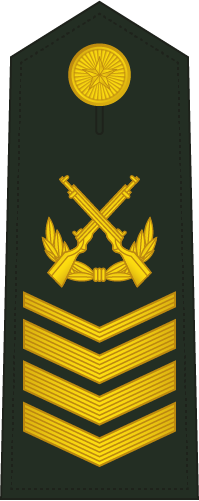
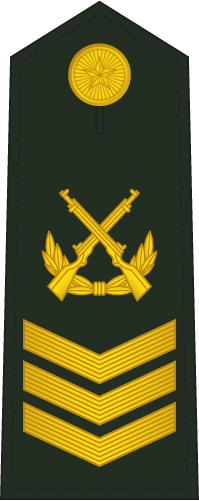
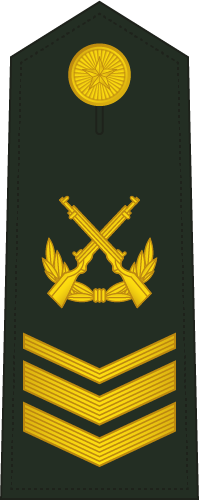
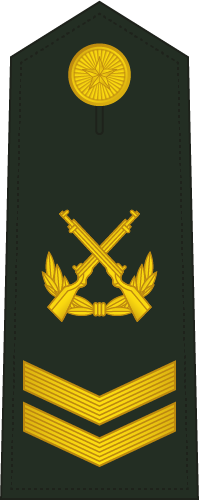
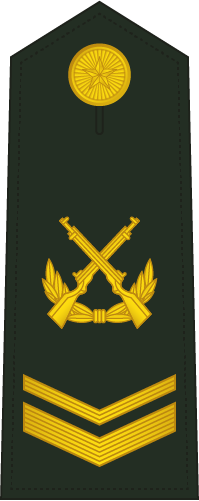
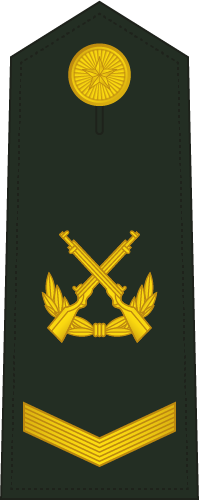
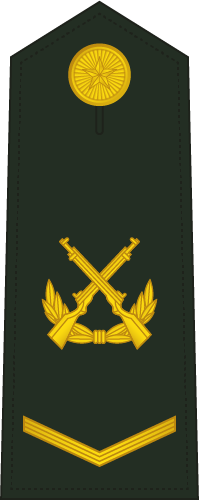
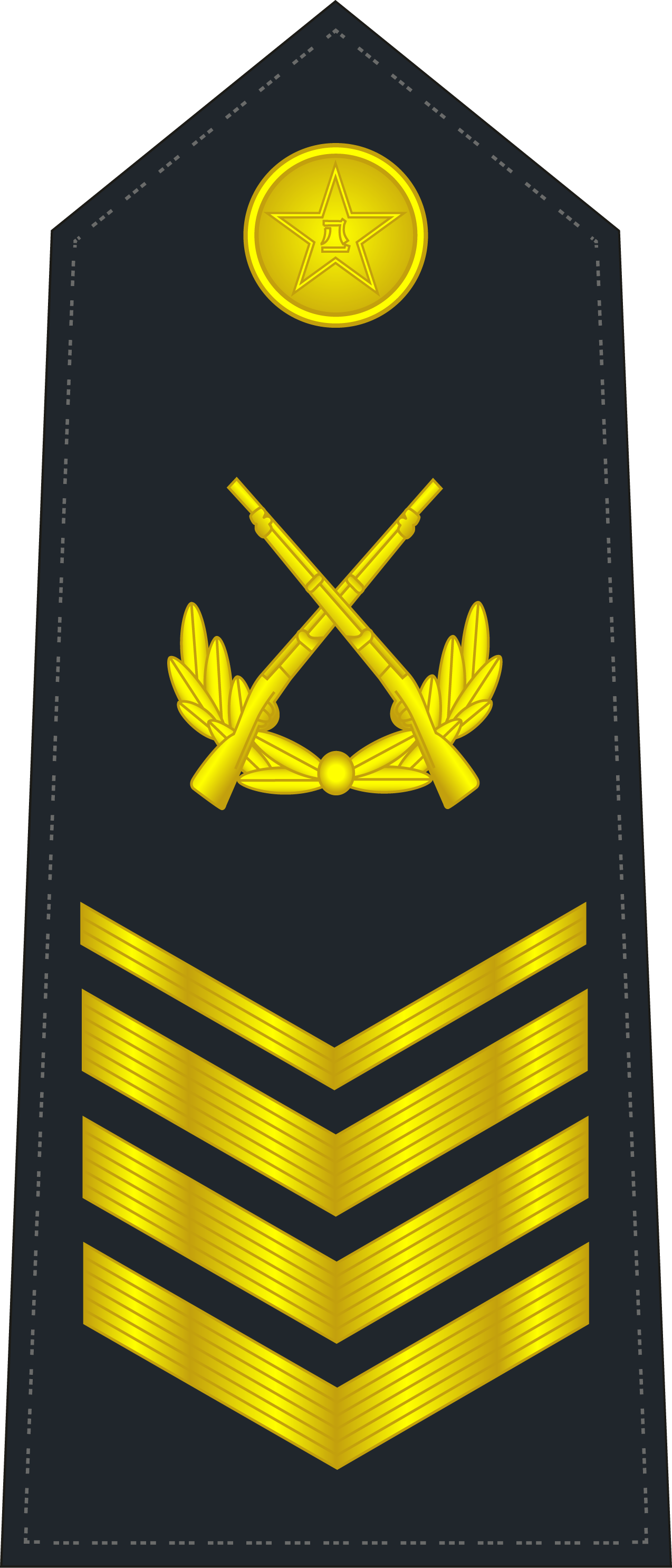
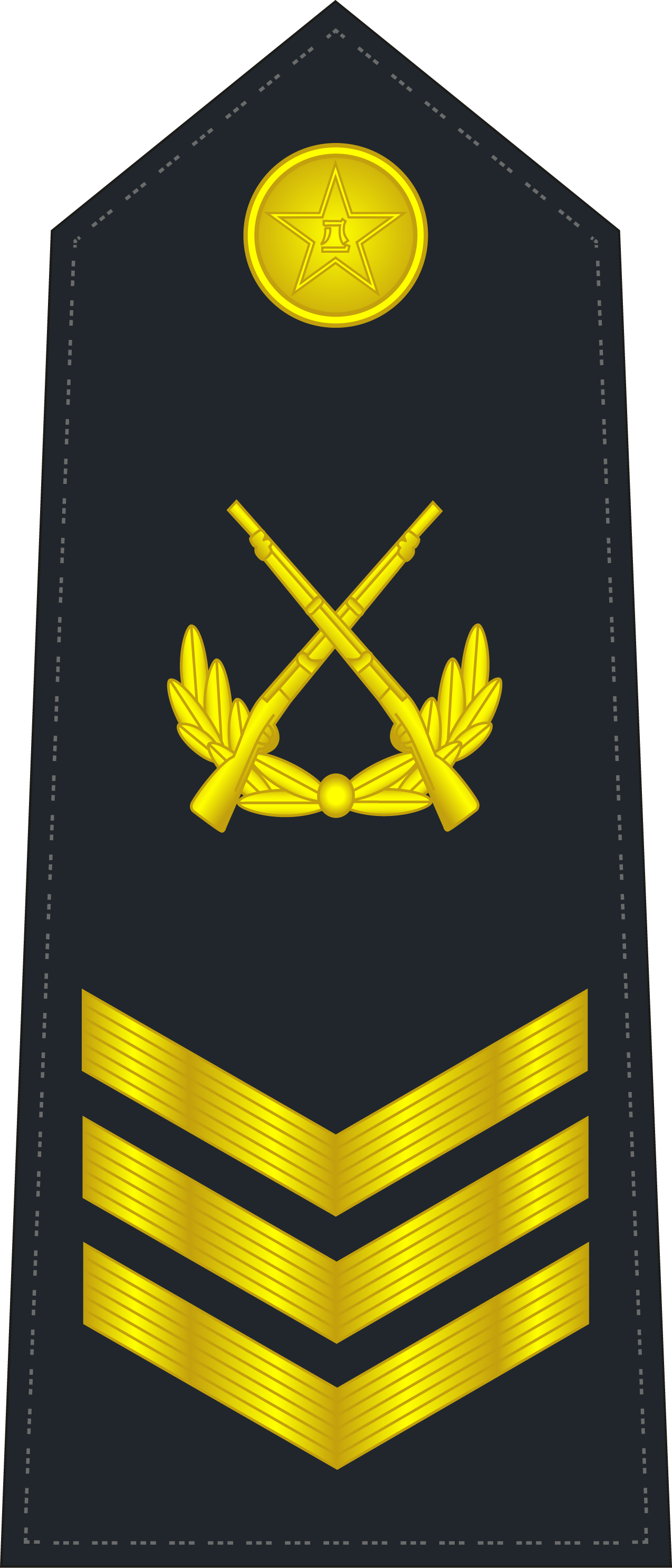
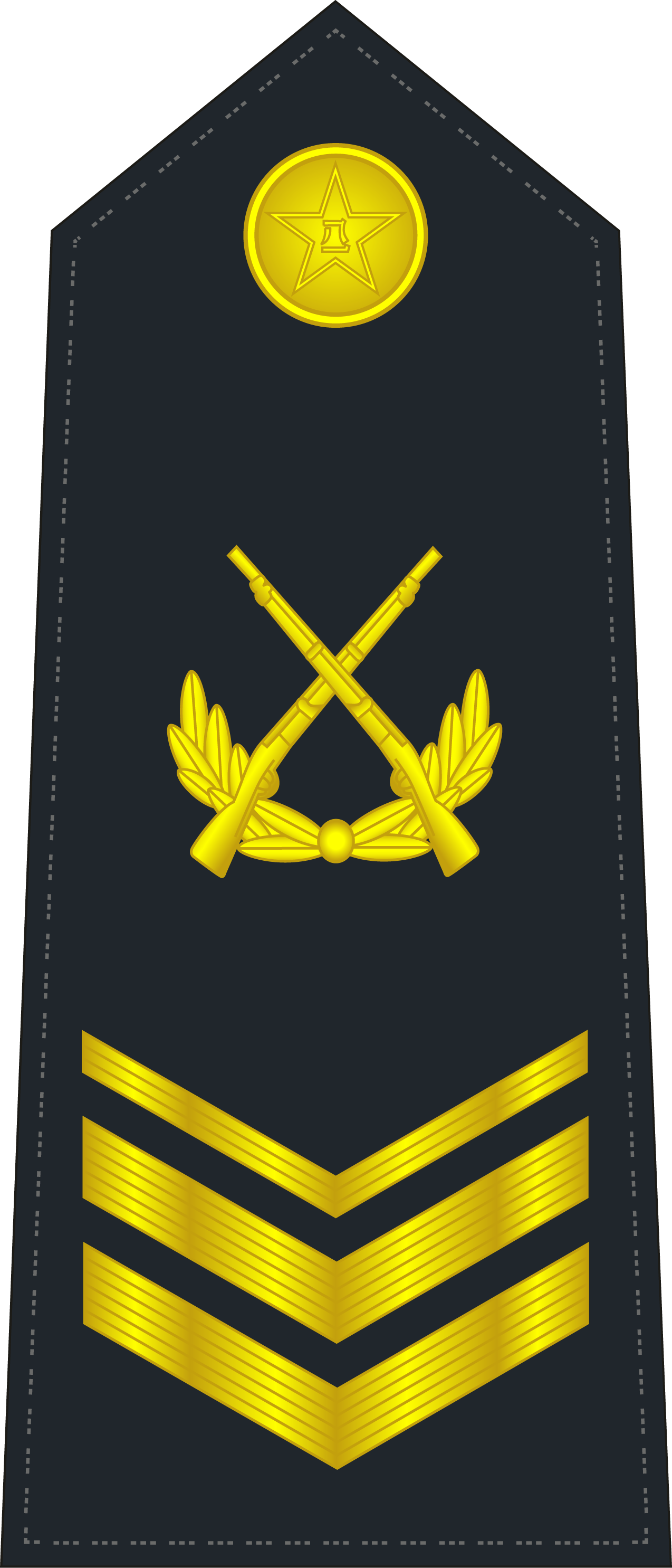
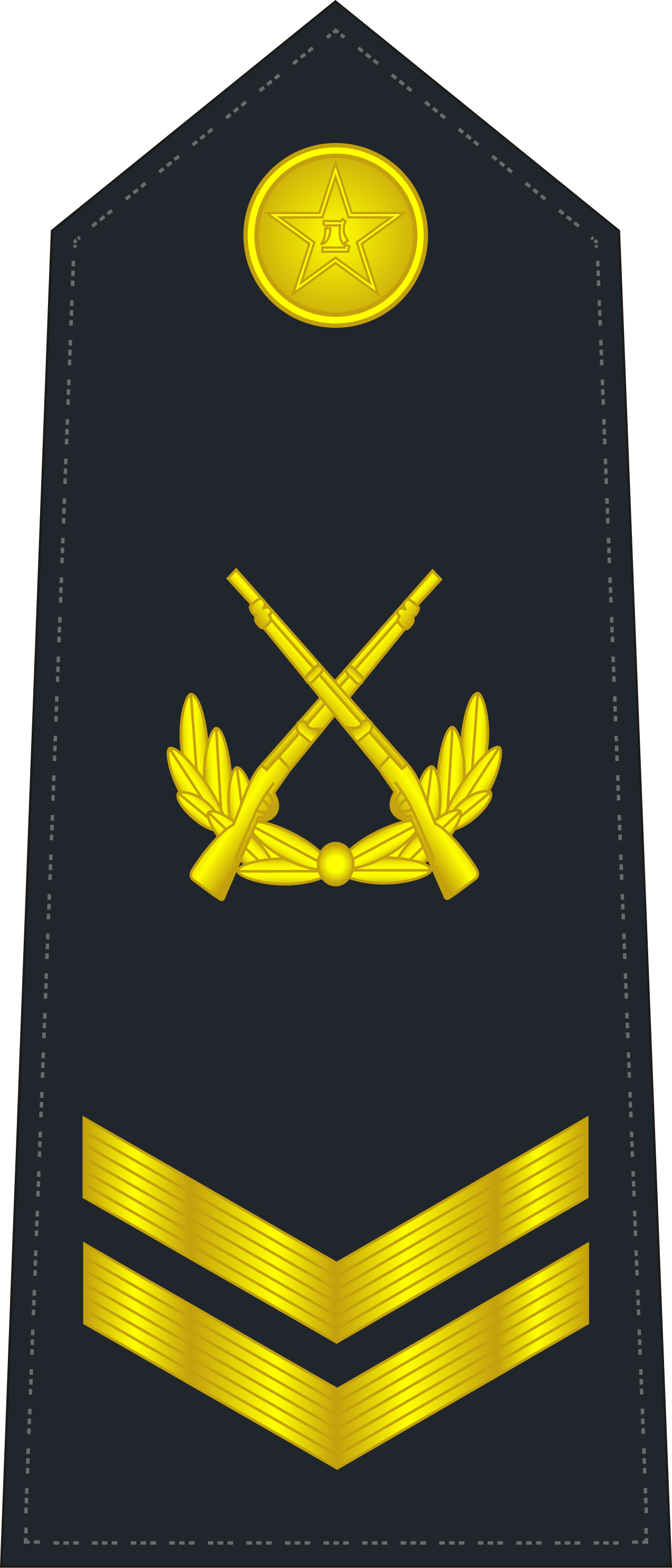
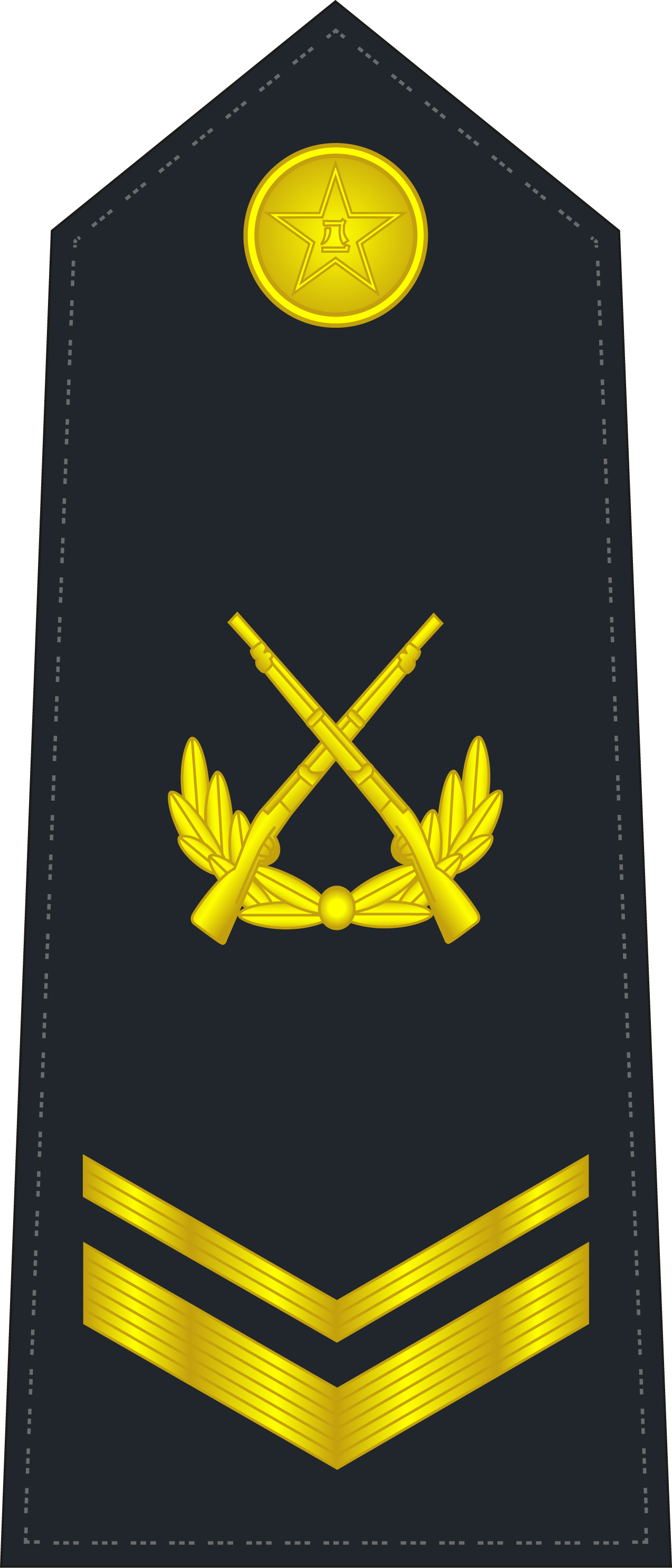
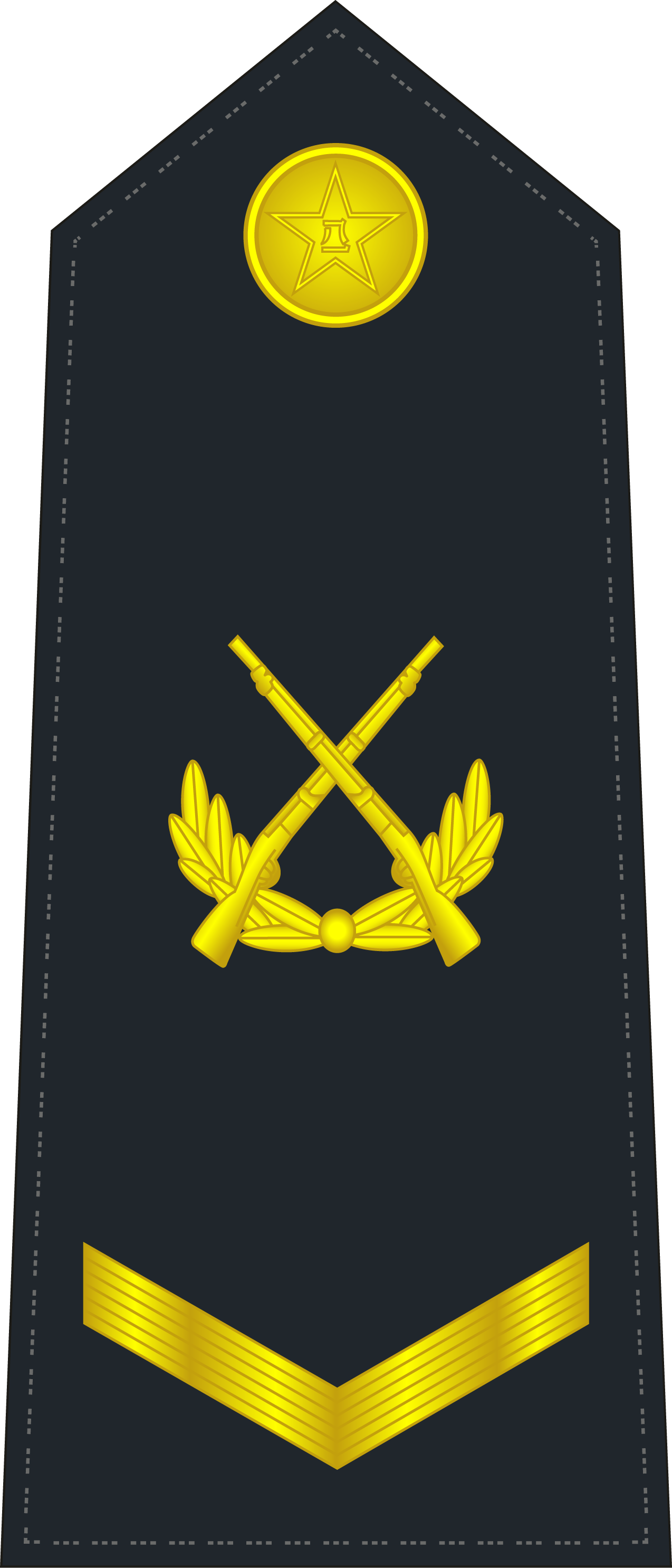
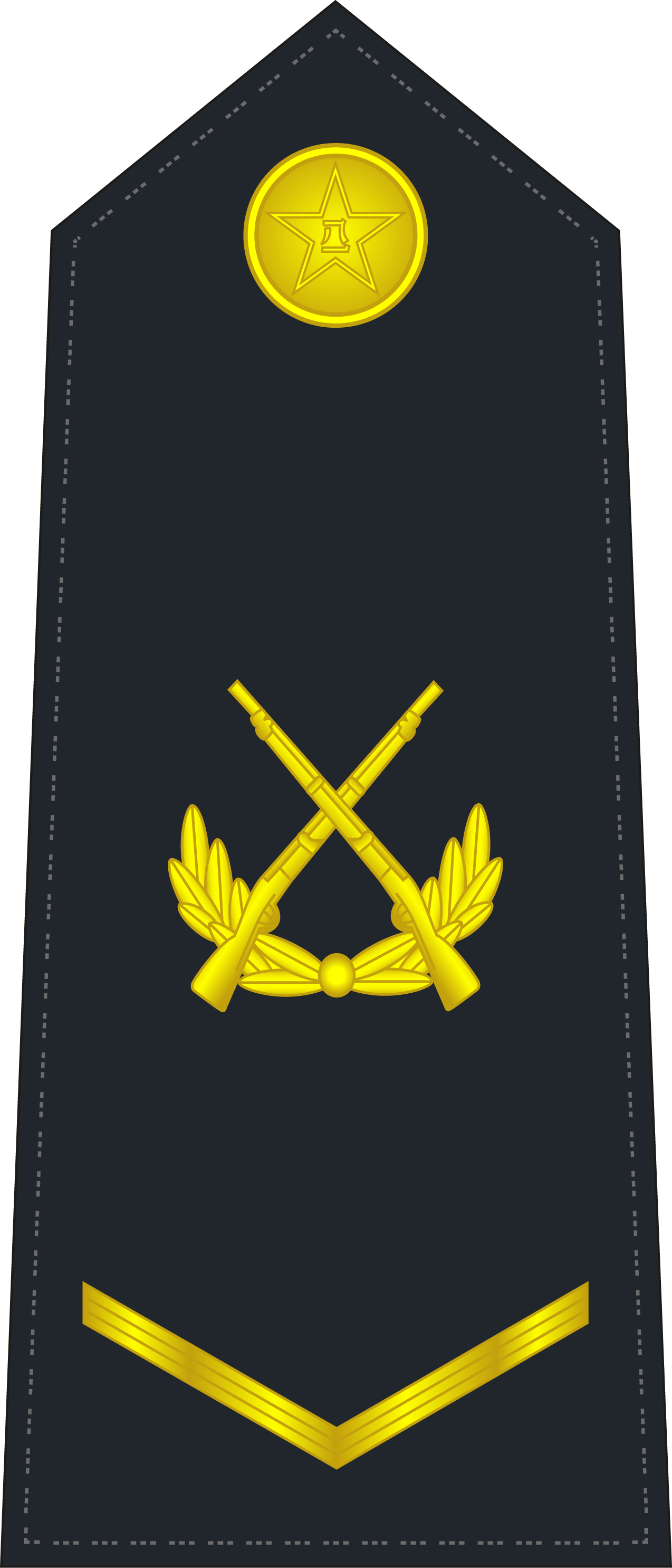
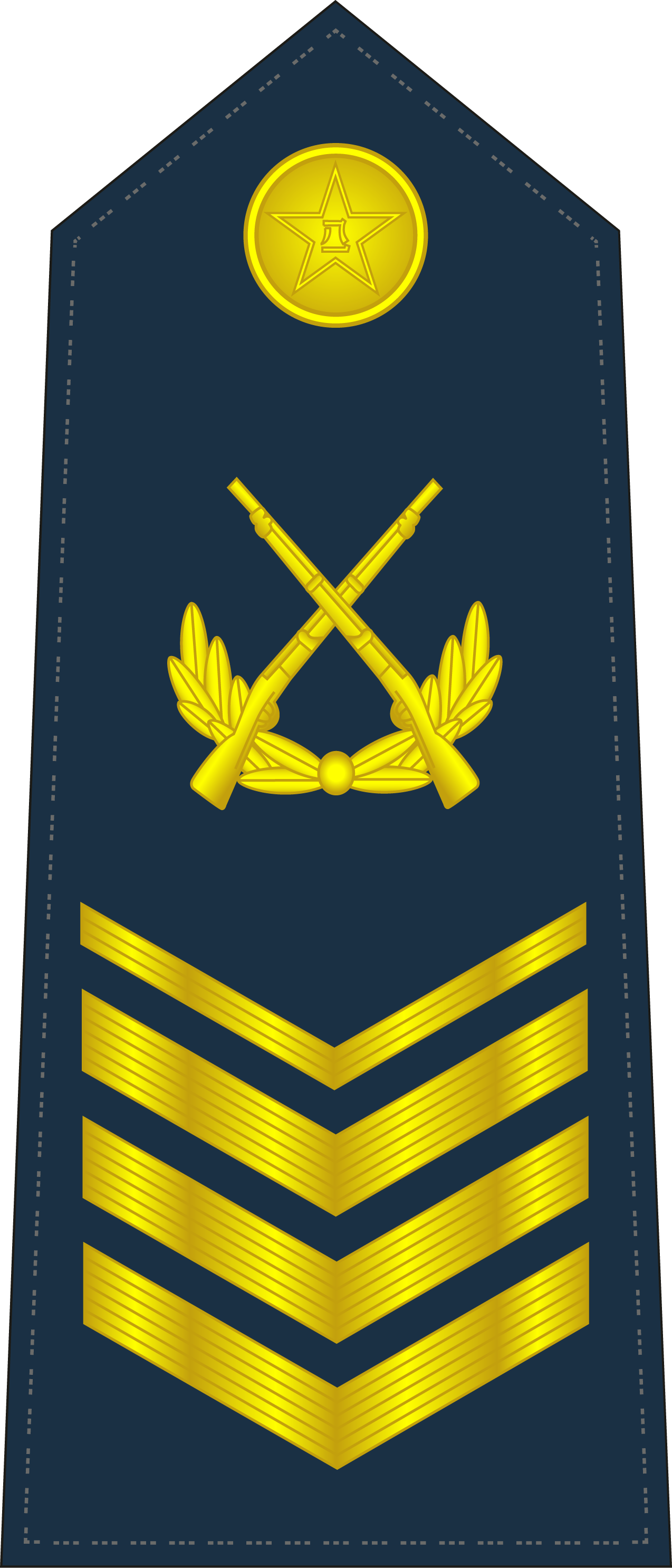
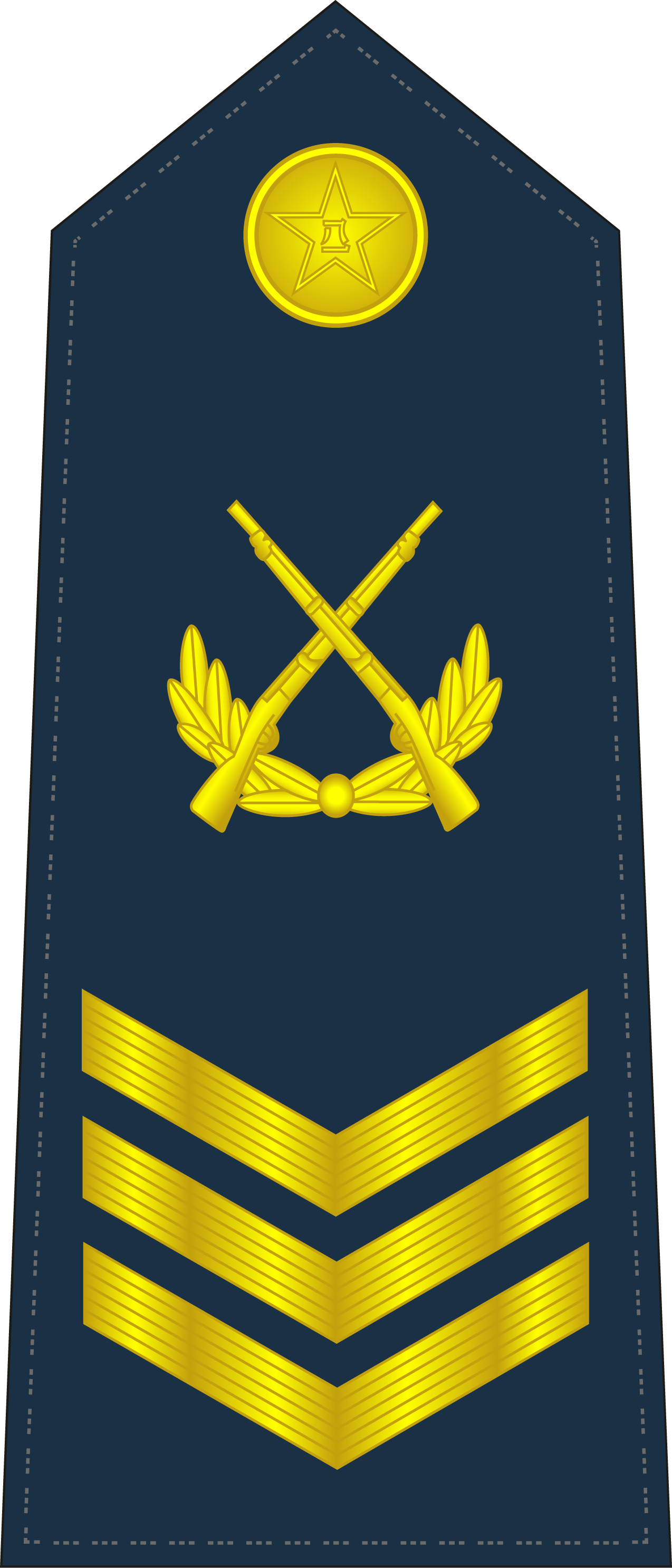
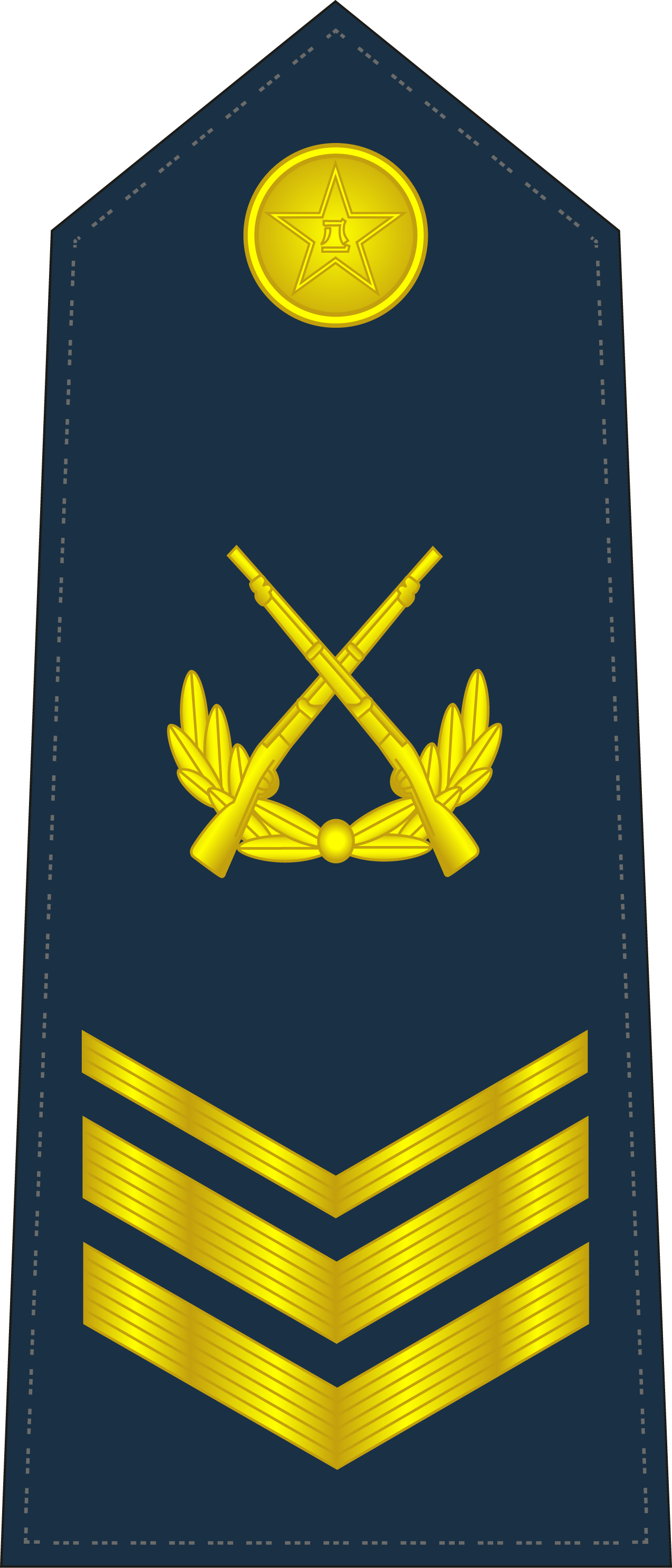
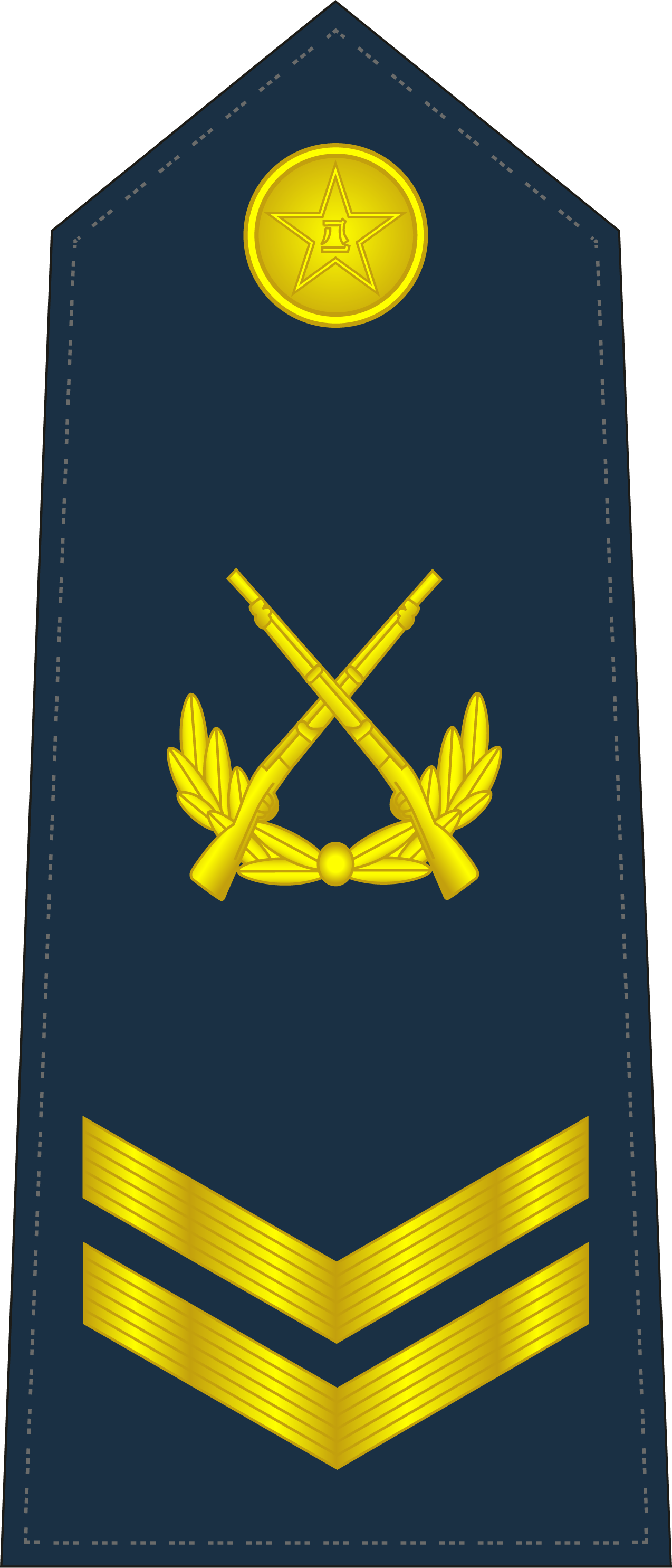
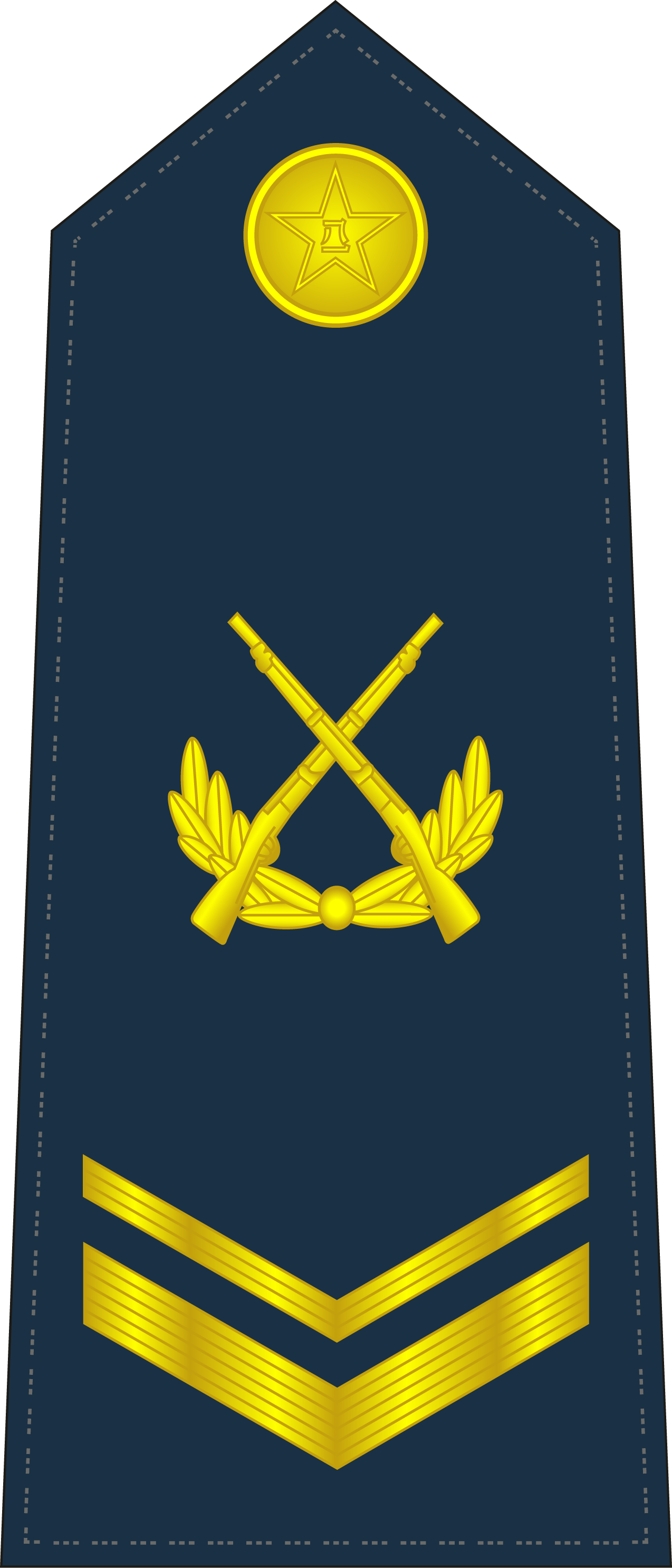
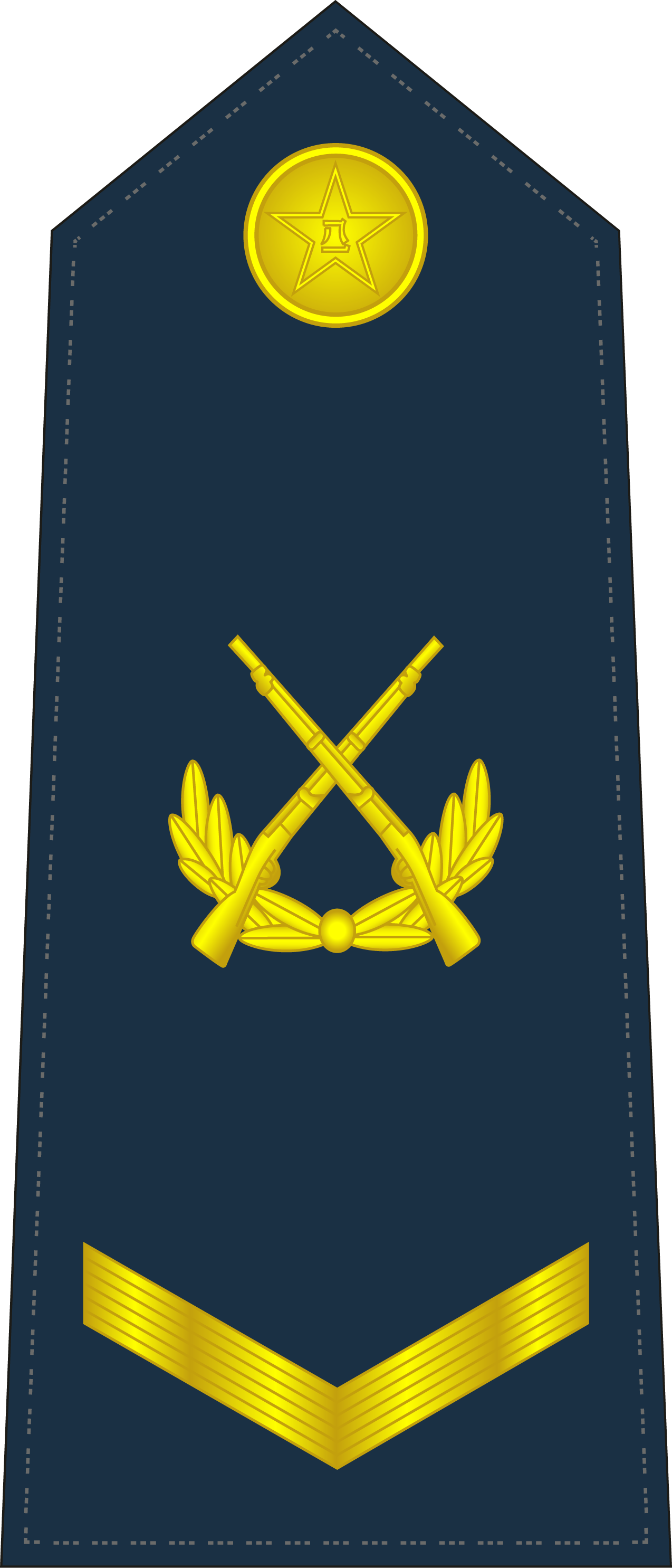
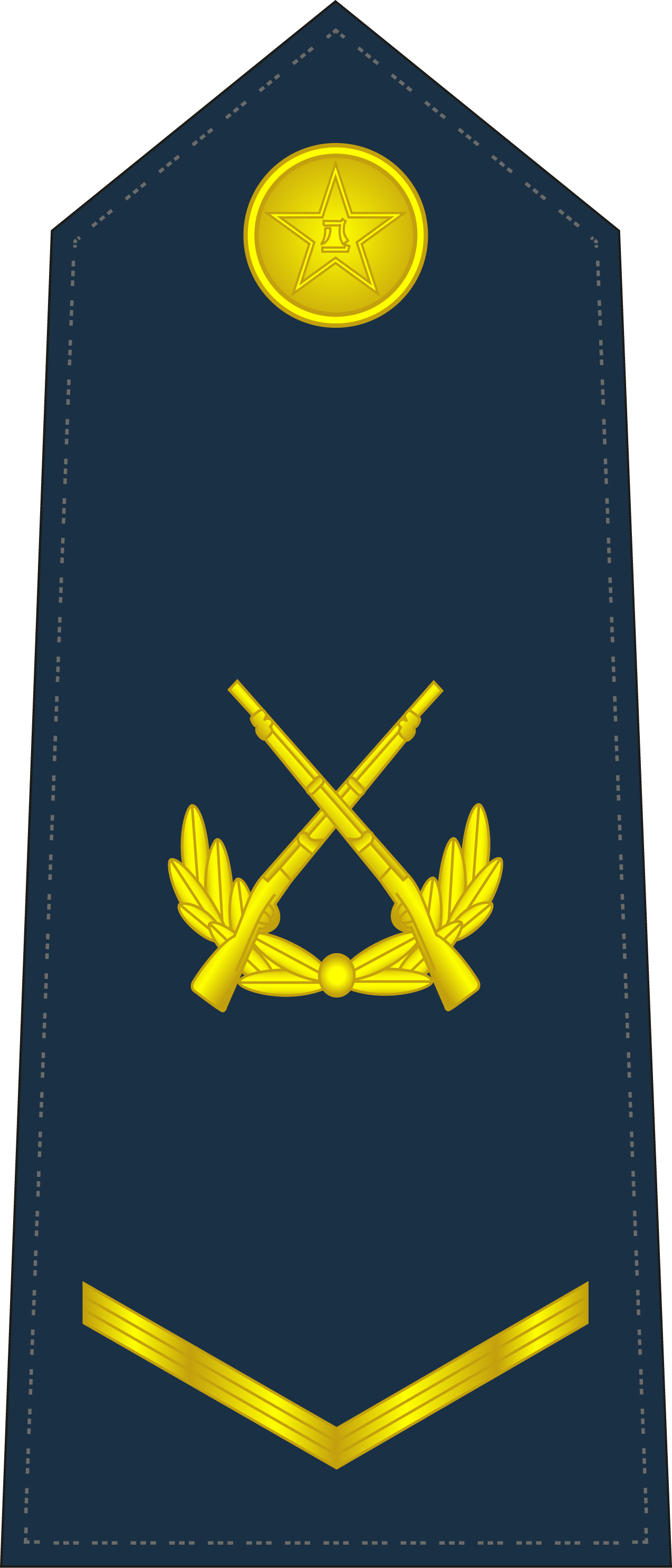
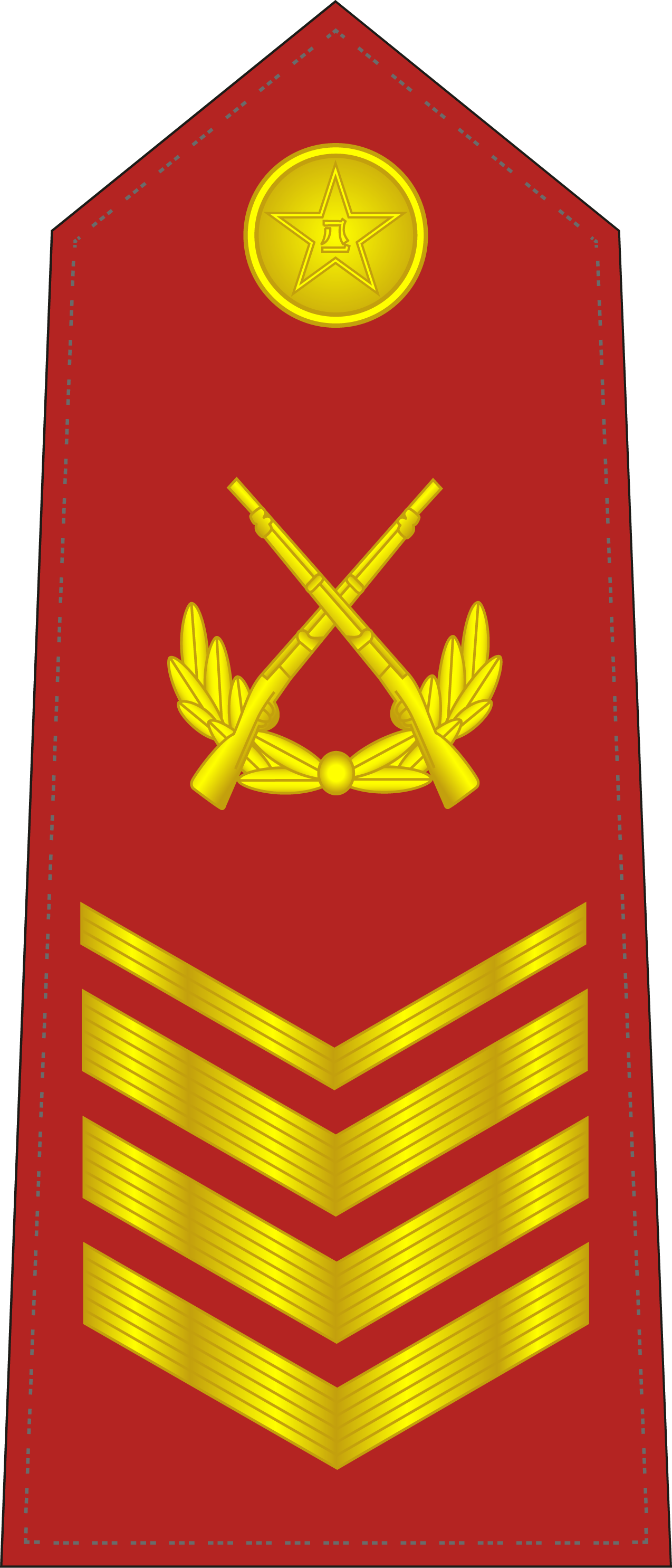
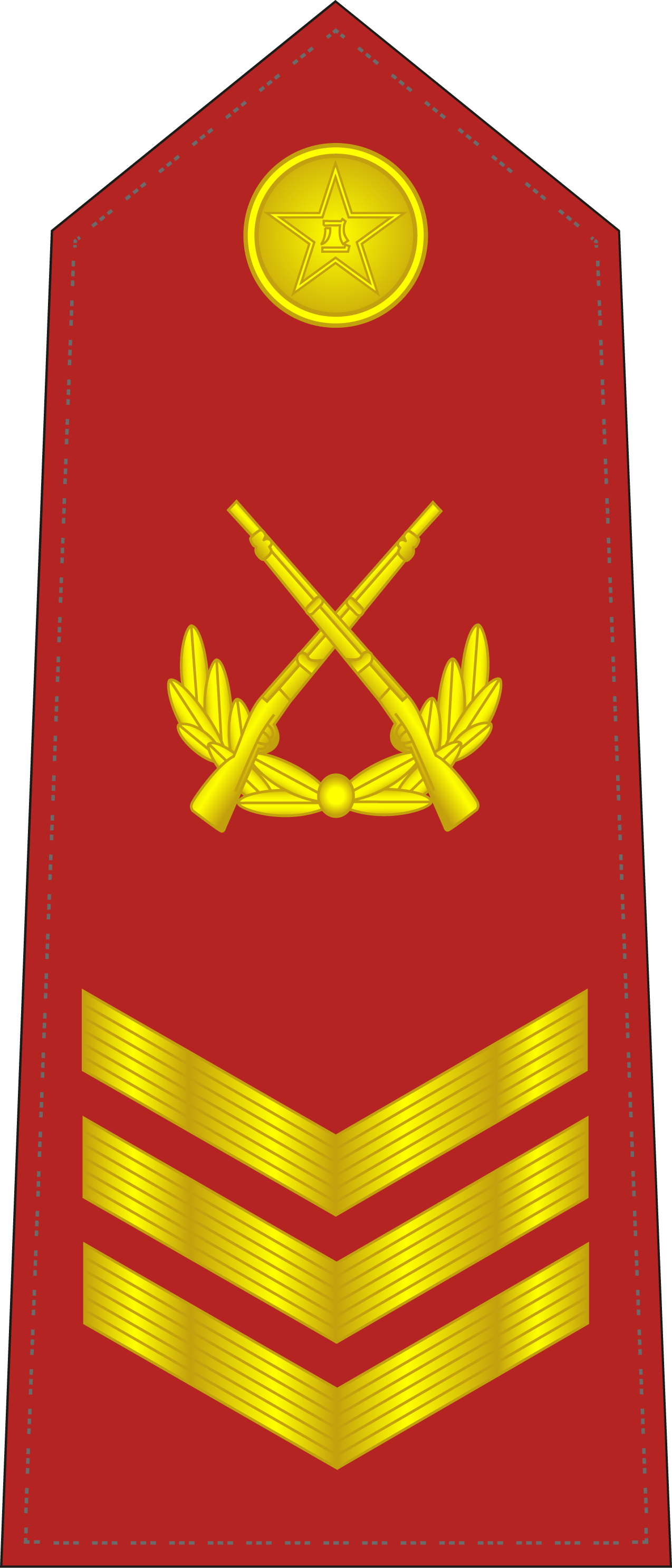
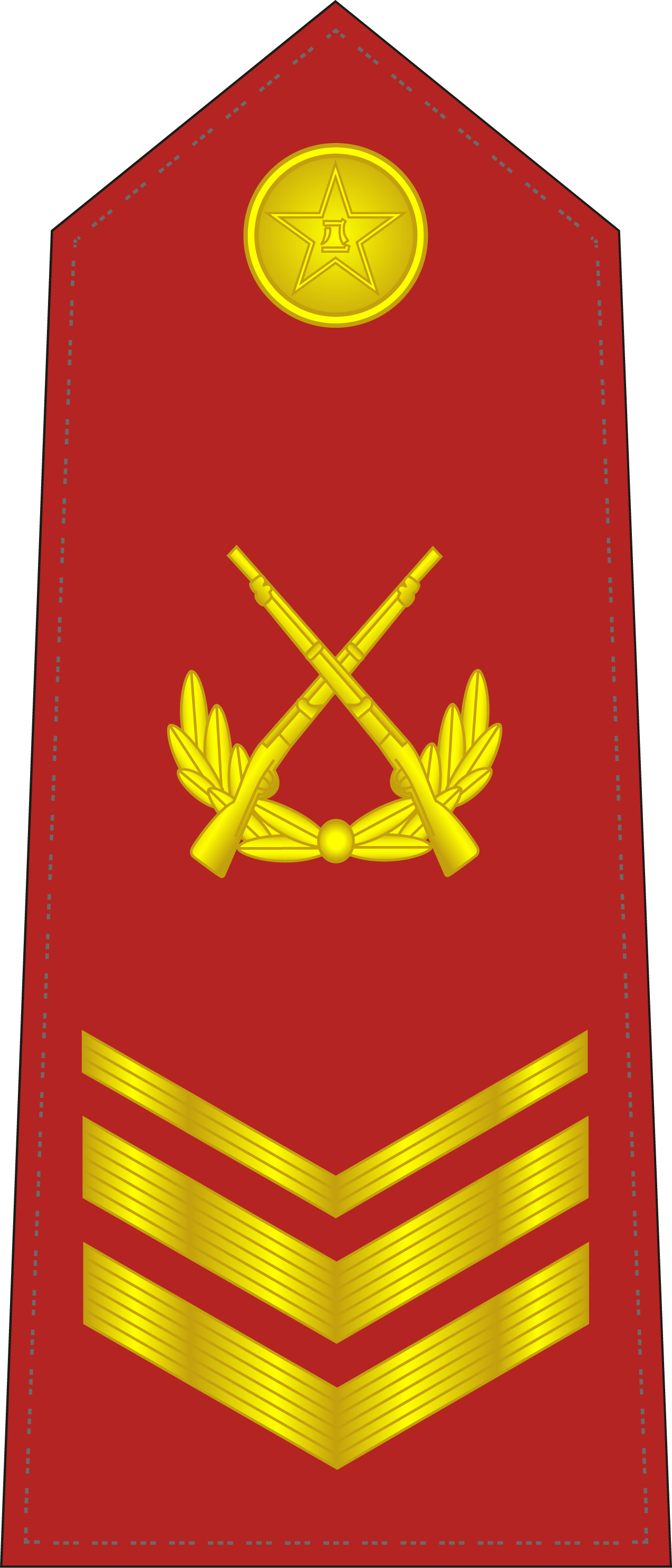
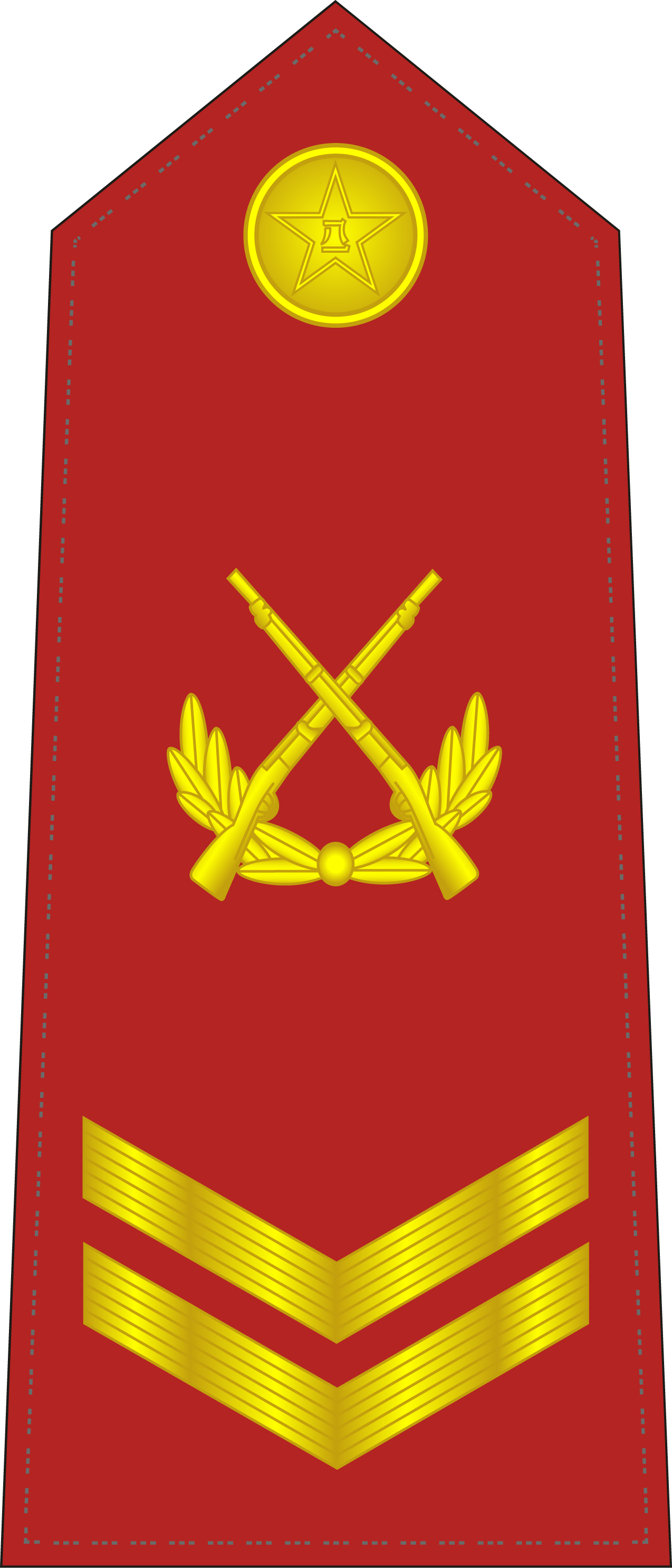
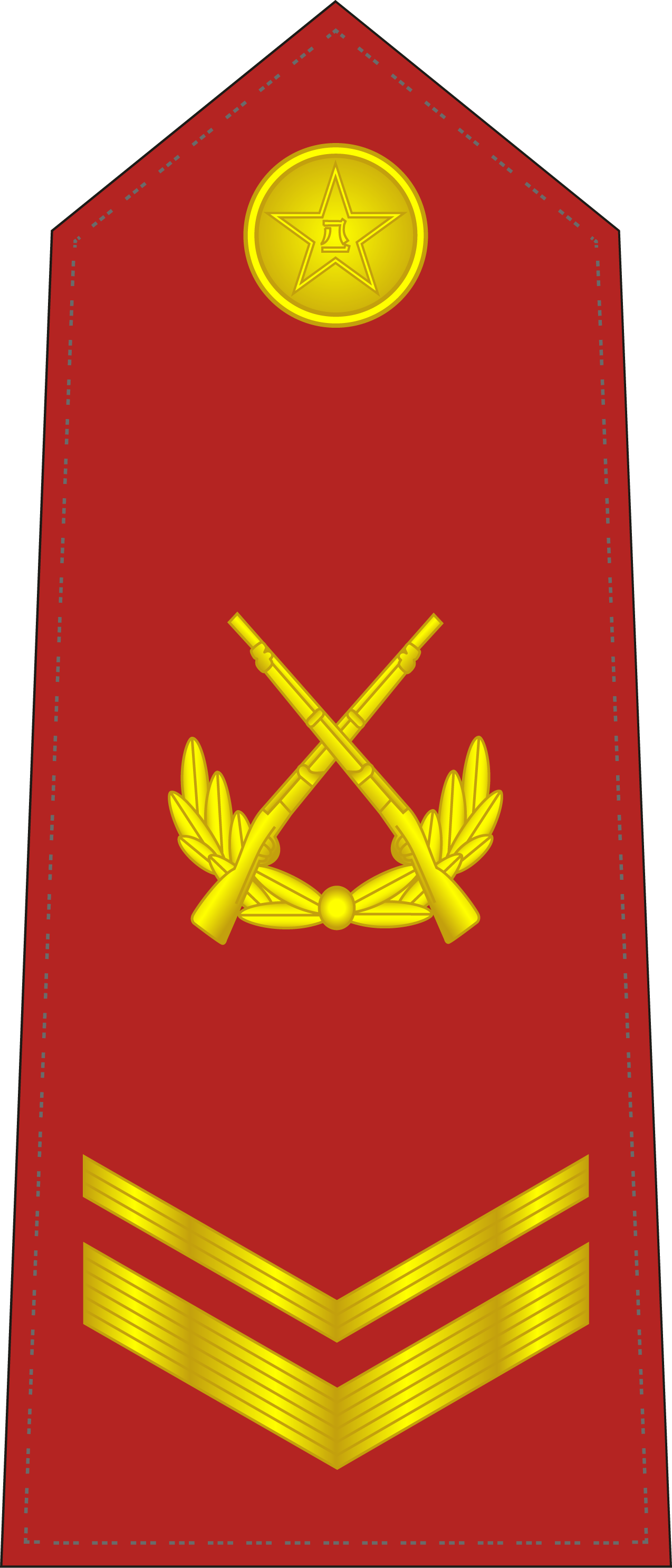
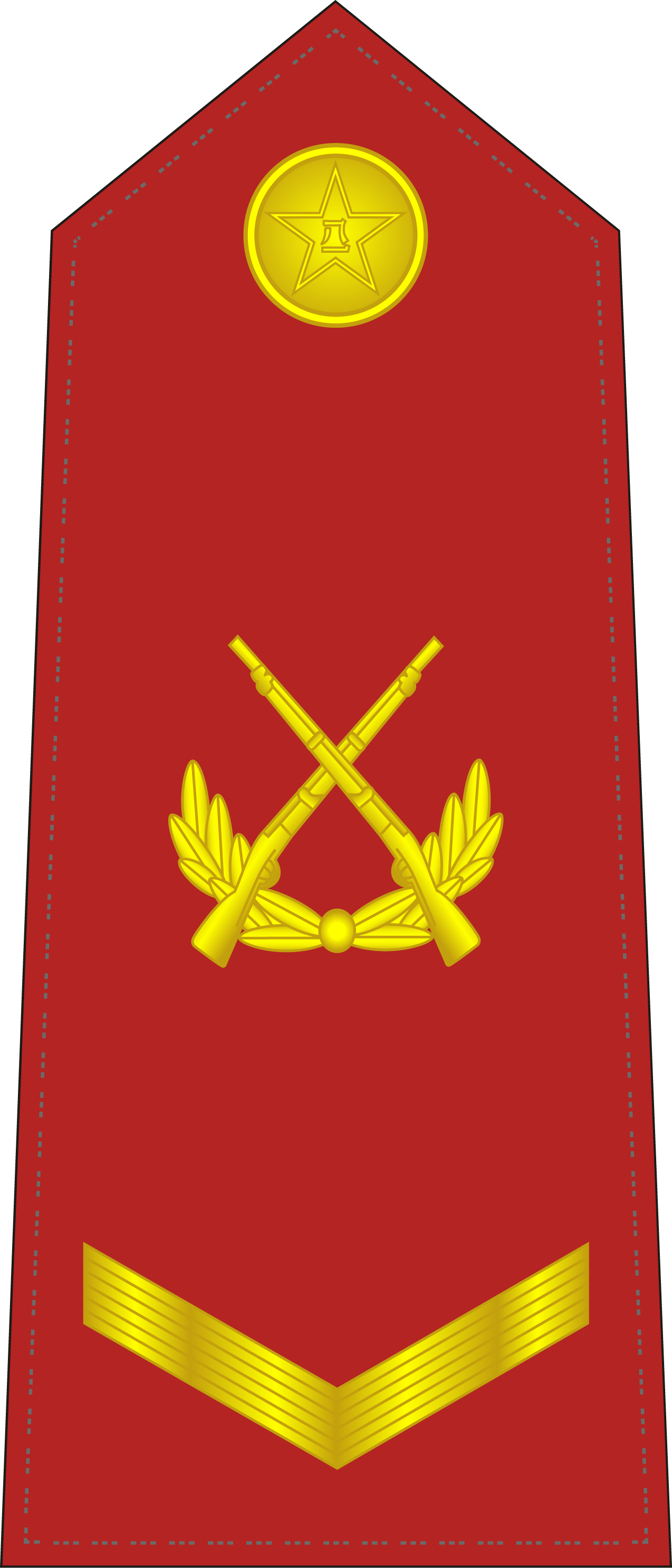
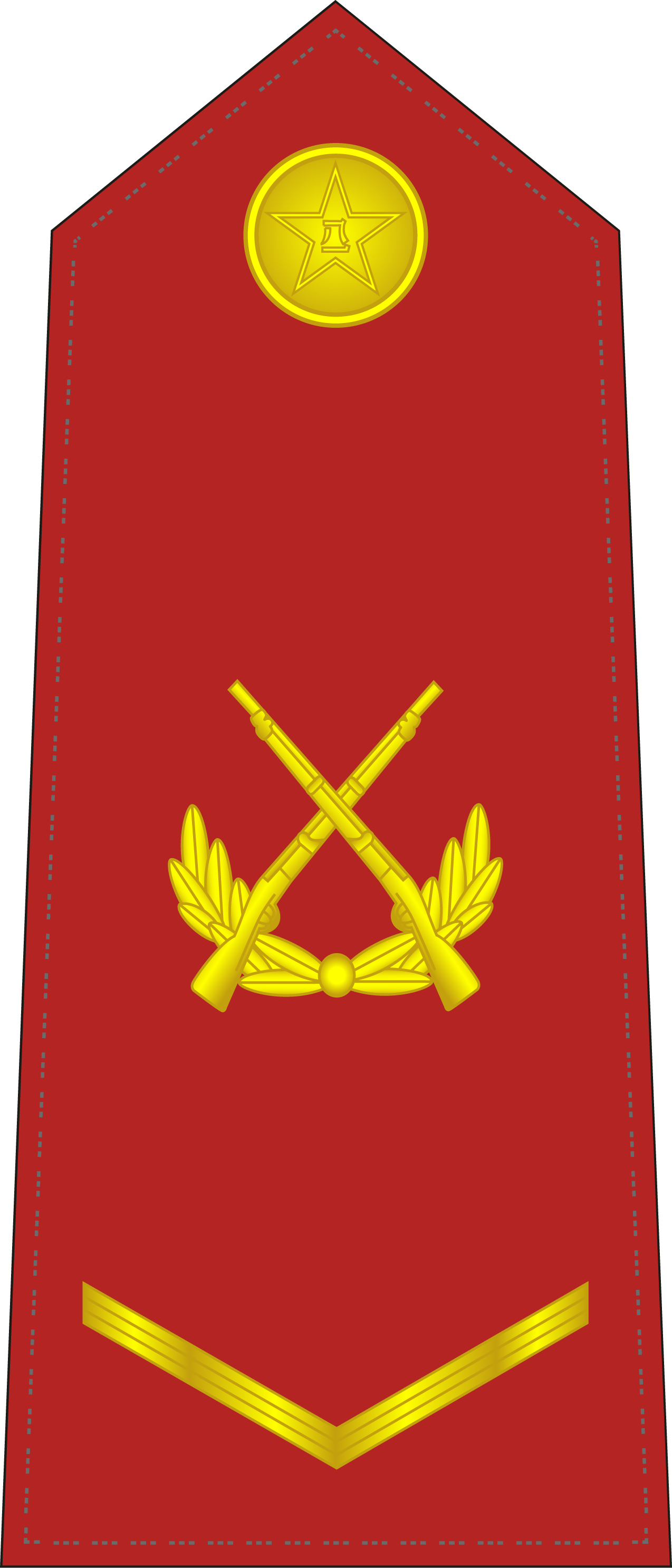
Rank group	Non-commissioned officers
Chinese	一级军士长	二级军士长	三级军士长	四级军士长	上士	中士	下士
Pinyin	Yījí jūnshìzhǎng	Èrjí jūnshìzhǎng	Sānjí jūnshìzhǎng	Sìjí jūnshìzhǎng	Shàngshì	Zhōngshì	Xiàshì
Literal translation	First-class soldier leader	Second-class soldier leader	Third-class soldier leader	Fourth-class soldier leader	Upper soldier	Middle soldier	Lower soldier
PLA Ground Force (Note: Same insignia for the Rocket Force, Aerospace Force, and Cyberspace Force.)
PLA Navy
PLA Air Force
People's Armed Police
Rank group	Non-commissioned officers

== Taiwan ==
Rank group	Non-commissioned officers
Chinese	一等士官長	二等士官長	三等士官長	上士	中士	下士
Pinyin	Yīděng shìguānzhǎng	Èrděng shìguānzhǎng	Sānděng shìguānzhǎng	Shàngshì	Zhōngshì	Xiàshì
Literal translation	First-class officer leader	Second-class officer leader	Third-class officer leader	Upper officer	Middle officer	Lower officer
Republic of China Army
ROC Military Police
Republic of China Navy
Republic of China Air Force
Republic of China Marine Corps
	一等士官長; Yīděng shìguānzhǎng	二等士官長; Èrděng shìguānzhǎng	三等士官長; Sānděng shìguānzhǎng	上士; Shàngshì	中士; Zhōngshì	下士; Xiàshì
Rank group	Non-commissioned officers

== Japan ==
Rank group	Enlisted
Japanese	士長	1等士	2等士
Romanization	Shichō	Ittō shi	Nitō shi
Literal translation	Officer leader	First-class officer	Second-class officer
Japan Ground Self-Defense Force
Japan Maritime Self-Defense Force
Japan Air Self-Defense Force
Rank group	Enlisted

== North Korea ==
- Sa
- Hangul: 사
- Hanja: 士
- RR: sa
- MR: sa

Rank group	Non-commissioned officers				Enlisted
Hangul	특무상사	상사	중사	하사	상급병사	중급병사	하급병사	전사
Hanja	特務上士	上士	中士	下士	上級兵士	中級兵士	下級兵士	戰士
Romanization	T'ŭkmu-sangsa	Sangsa	Chungsa	Hasa	Sanggŭp-pyŏngsa	Chungŭp-pyŏngsa	Hagŭp-pyŏngsa	Chŏnsa
Literal translation	Special duty upper officer	Upper officer	Middle officer	Lower officer	Upper-class soldier	Middle-class soldier	Lower-class soldier	Combat officer
KPA Ground Force
U.S. equivalent	Sergeant major	Master sergeant	Sergeant first class	Staff sergeant	Sergeant	Corporal	Private first class	Private
KPA Navy
U.S. equivalent	Master chief petty officer	Senior chief petty officer	Chief petty officer	Petty officer first class	Petty officer second class	Petty officer third class	Seaman	Seaman apprentice
KPA Air Force
U.S. equivalent	Chief master sergeant	Senior master sergeant	Master sergeant	Technical sergeant	Staff sergeant	Sergeant	Airman first class	Airman
	특무상사; T'ŭkmu-sangsa	상사; Sangsa	중사; Chungsa	하사; Hasa	상급병사; Sanggŭp-pyŏngsa	중급병사; Chungŭp-pyŏngsa	하급병사; Hagŭp-pyŏngsa	전사; Chŏnsa
Rank group	Non-commissioned officers				Enlisted

== South Korea ==
Rank group	Non-commissioned officer
Hangul	원사	상사	중사	하사
Hanja	元士	上士	中士	下士
Romanization	Wonsa	Sangsa	Jungsa	Hasa
Literal translation	Chief soldier	Upper soldier	Middle soldier	Lower soldier
Armed Forces
U.S. equivalent (Army)	Sergeant major	Master sergeant	Sergeant first class	Staff sergeant
U.S. equivalent (Navy)	Master chief petty officer	Senior chief petty officer	Chief petty officer	Petty officer first class
U.S. equivalent (Air Force)	Chief master sergeant	Senior master sergeant	Master sergeant	Technical sergeant
U.S. equivalent (Marine Corps)	Sergeant major	Master sergeant	Gunnery sergeant	Staff sergeant
Rank group	Non-commissioned officers

== Vietnam ==
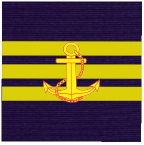
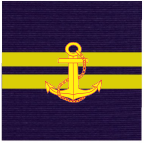
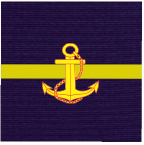
Rank group	Non-commissioned officers
Vietnamese	Thượng sĩ	Trung sĩ	Hạ sĩ
Chữ Hán	上士	中士	下士
Literal translation	Upper warior	Middle warrior	Lower warrior
Vietnam People's Ground Force (Note: Same insignia for the Mausoleum Command.)
Vietnam People's Navy
Navy sailor suit
Vietnam People's Air Force
Vietnam Border Guard
Vietnam Coast Guard
Rank group	Non-commissioned officers

=== South Vietnamese variant ===
Rank group	Senior NCOs				Junior NCOs
Native name	Thượng sĩ nhất	Thượng sĩ	Trung sĩ nhất	Trung sĩ	Hạ sĩ nhất	Hạ sĩ
Chữ Hán	上士一	上士	中士一	中士	下士一	下士
Literal translation	Upper warrior first class	Upper warrior	Middle warrior first class	Middle warrior	Lower warrior first class	Lower warrior
Army of the Republic of Vietnam (1967–1975)
Translation	Master sergeant, first class	Master sergeant	Sergeant first class	Sergeant	Corporal major	Corporal
Republic of Vietnam Navy (1967–1975)
Translation	Officer	Chief petty officer	Petty officer first class	Petty officer second class	Leading seaman	Able seaman
Republic of Vietnam Marine Division (1967–1975)
Translation	Master sergeant, first class	Master sergeant	Sergeant first class	Sergeant	Corporal major	Corporal
Republic of Vietnam Air Force (1967–1975)
Translation	Master sergeant, first class	Master sergeant	Sergeant first class	Sergeant	Corporal major	Corporal
Rank group	Senior NCOs				Junior NCOs

== See also ==
Ranks used in Chinese character-using countries

- General officer: Jiang (rank)
- Senior officer: Sa (rank), Xiao (rank), Lyeong
- Junior officer: Wei (rank)
- Non-commissioned officers: Shi (rank)
- Enlisted ranks: Bing (rank), Shi (rank)
