= Ngụy Văn Thà =

Vietnamese naval officer

- Born: 16 January 1943; Trảng Bàng, Tây Ninh province, French Indochina
- Died: 19 January 1974 (aged 31); Paracel Islands, South Vietnam
- Military career
- Allegiance: South Vietnam
- Branch: Republic of Vietnam Navy
- Service years: 1963–1974
- Rank: Commander
- Units: HQ-17 (Giang đoàn 23); HQ-504 (Qui Nhơn); HQ-331 (Giang pháo hạm); HQ-10 (RVNS Nhật Tảo)
- Conflicts: Vietnam War: Battle of the Paracel Islands †
- Awards: National Order of Vietnam Vietnam Gallantry Cross with palm

Ngụy Văn Thà (16 January 1943 - 19 January 1974) was a Republic of Vietnam (South Vietnam) naval officer. He was commanding officer of the corvette RVNS Nhật Tảo (HQ-10) during the Battle of the Paracel Islands and was killed when a Chinese missile hit the HQ-10's bridge.

== Biography ==
He was born on January 16, 1943 in Trảng Bàng, Tây Ninh province into a wealthy landowner family. He attended elementary and middle school in Tây Ninh province. When he reached middle school, his family sent him back to Saigon to study. In 1962, he graduated from high school with a full degree (Part II).

== Medal ==
He was awarded 13 medals of all kinds, including:
National Order of Vietnam (5th class)
Vietnam Gallantry Cross with palm

== Family ==
He has a wife, Ms. Huynh Thi Sinh, and three daughters. Currently, she and her children still live in Vietnam.
