= Operation Michigan =

Operation Michigan may refer to:

- Operation Michigan (1945), World War II US Navy action
- Operation Michigan (1993), an attack carried out by US AH-1 Cobra attack helicopters on a Habr Gidr clan meeting in Somalia
- Operation Michigan (2007), an Iraq War operation
