= Landing craft mechanized =

Landing craft designed for carrying vehicles

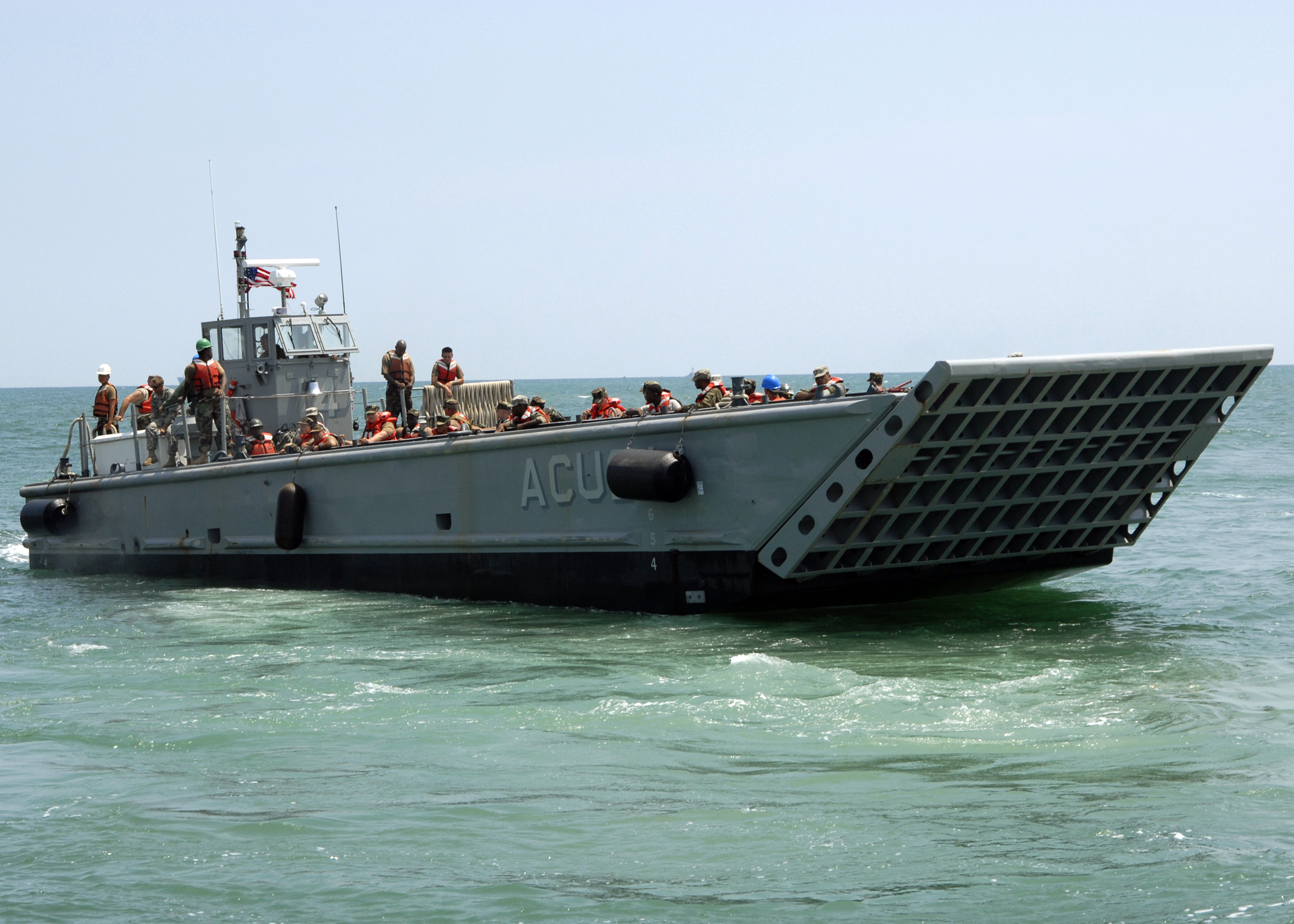
U.S. Navy landing craft mechanized (LCM) during logistics exercise in June 2009

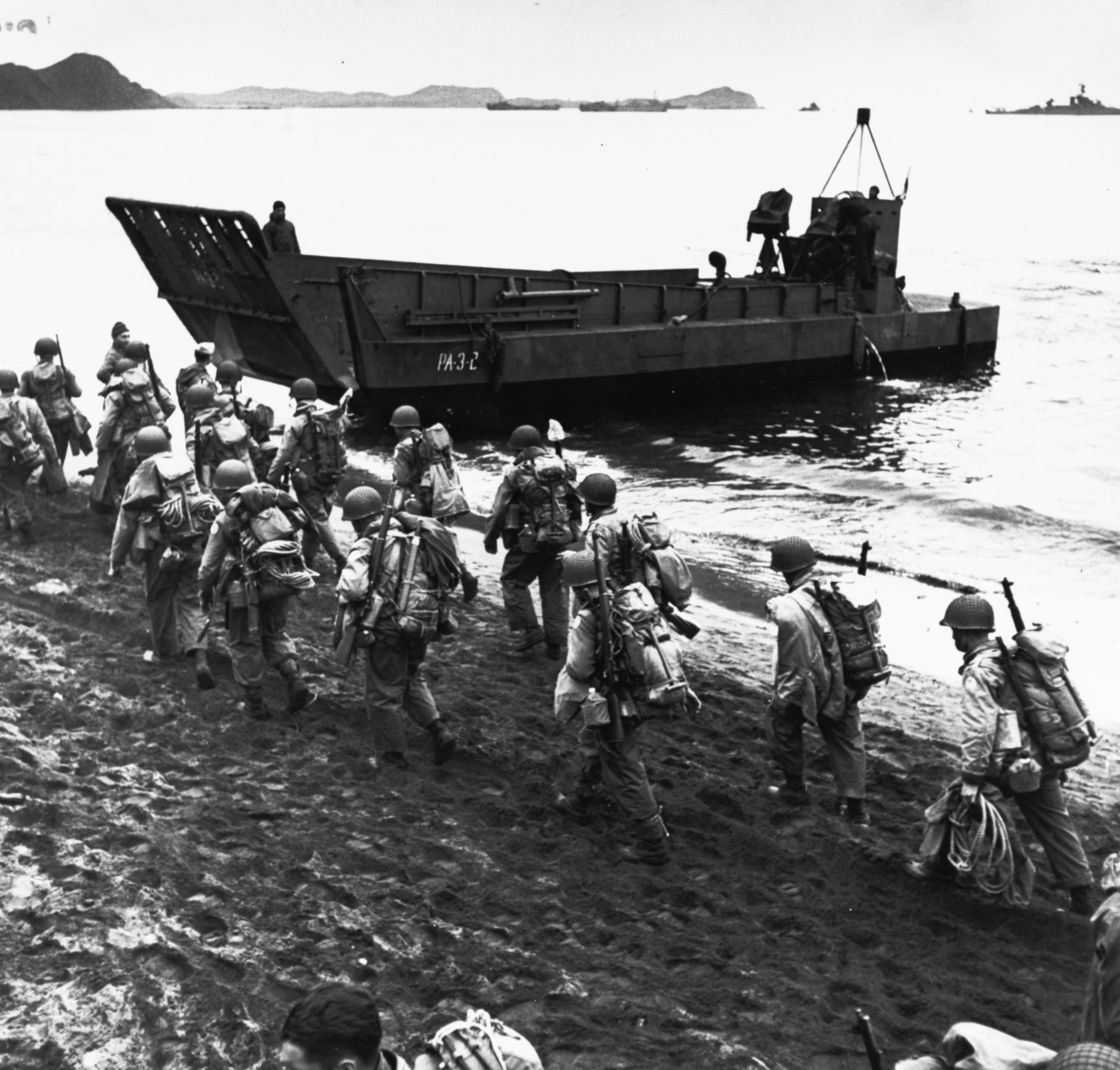
US troops and an LCM in August 1943

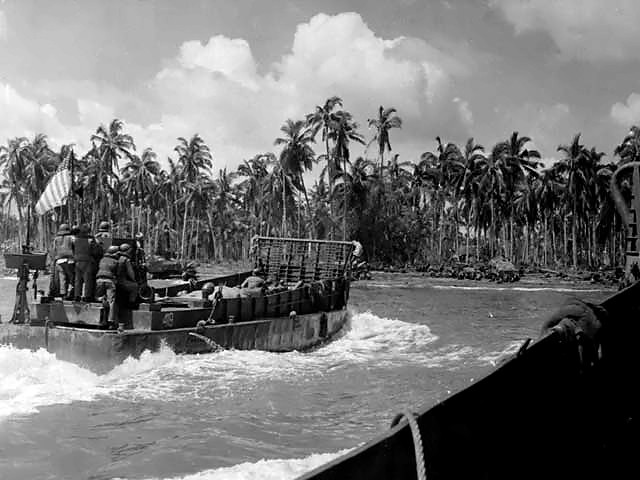
An LCM during the invasion of Leyte

The landing craft mechanized (LCM) is a military landing craft designed for carrying personnel and vehicles from ship to shore without requiring a pier or other shore-based structure. Multiple different models with varying size, capacity, and power plants were produced starting in 1920. They came to prominence during the Second World War when they were used to land troops and tanks during Allied amphibious assaults.

== Variants ==
There was no single design of LCM used, unlike the landing craft, vehicle, personnel (LCVP) or landing craft assault (LCA) landing craft made by the US and UK respectively. There were several different designs built by the UK and US and by different manufacturers.

The British motor landing craft (MLC) was conceived and tested in the 1920s and was used from 1924 in exercises. Nine were in service at the start of the war. It was the first purpose-built tank landing craft. It was the progenitor of all subsequent LCM designs.

=== LCM (1) ===
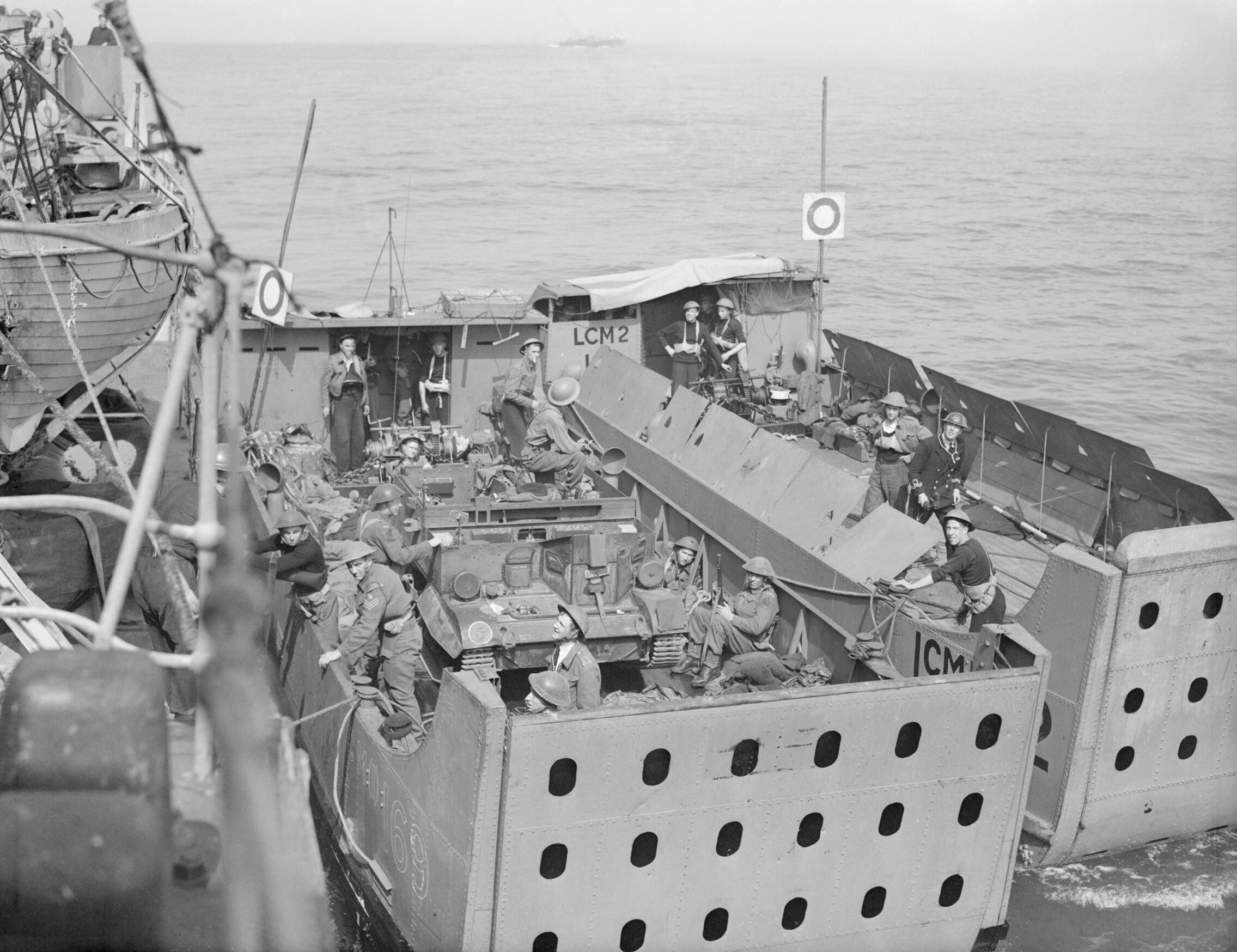
Two British LCM(2)s after the Dieppe Raid 1942

The landing craft, mechanised Mark I, was an early British model. It was able to be slung under the davits of a liner or on a cargo ship boom with the result that it was limited to a 16-ton tank.

The LCM Mark I was used during the Allied landings in Norway (one alongside the MLCs), and at Dieppe and some 600 were built.

- Displacement: 35 tonnes
- Length: 13.6 m (44 ft 7 in)
- Width: 4.27 m (14 ft 0 in)
- Draught: 1.22 m (4 ft 0 in)
- Machinery: two Chrysler 100 hp petrol engines
- Speed: 7 knots
- Crew: 6 men
- Armament: two .303 in. Lewis guns
- Capacity: one medium tank, or 26.8 tons of cargo or 60 troops
  - 100 men
  - 54,500 lb (24.3 long tons) with 9 in (23 cm) of freeboard

=== LCM (2) ===
The first American LCM design, from the US Navy's Bureau of Construction and Repair. Approximately 150 were built by American Car & Foundry and Higgins Industries.

- Displacement: 29 tons
- Length: 45 ft (14 m)
- Beam: 14 ft 1 in (4.29 m)
- Draft: 3 ft (0.91 m)
- Speed: 8.5 knots (15.7 km/h)
- Armament: two .50-cal M2 Browning machine guns
- Crew: 4
- Capacity; 100 troops, or one 13.5 ton tank, or 15 tons of cargo

=== LCM (3) ===
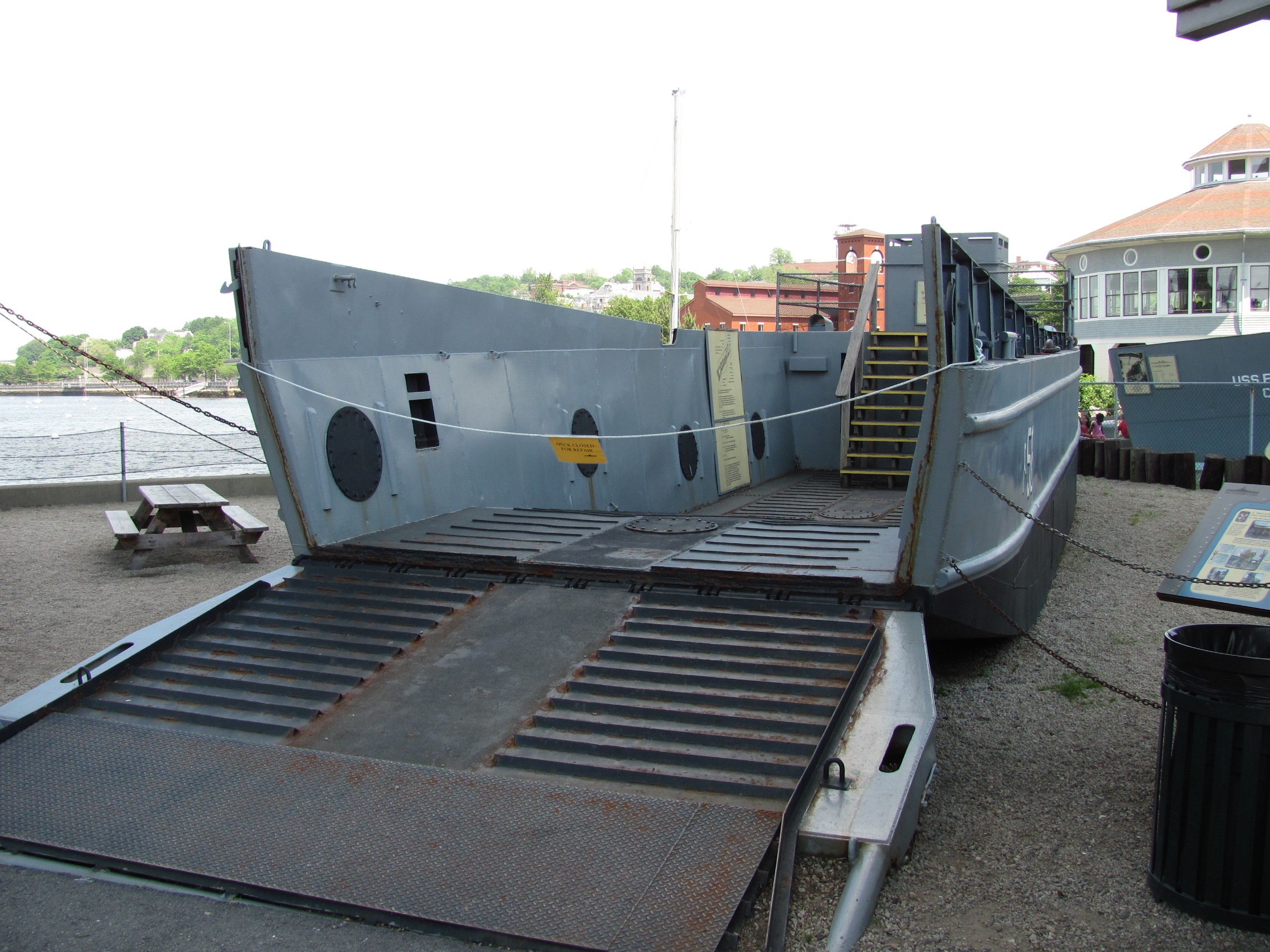
Higgins LCM-6 at Battleship Cove

There were two designs:

- Bureau

Capable of carrying 120,000 lb (54,000 kg) of cargo

- Higgins

In appearance very similar to the LCVP which Higgins Industries also constructed, with a 10-foot (3.0 m) wide load area at the front and a small armoured (1/4 inch steel) wheelhouse on the aft decking over the engine room. A vessel claiming to be a Higgins LCM-3 is on display at the Battleship Cove maritime museum in Fall River, Massachusetts, however this vessel has the superstructure and overall length of an LCM-6. Another Higgins LCM-3 is displayed at the Museo Storico Piana delle Orme in Province of Latina, Italy, 18 miles east of Anzio.

- Displacement: 52 tons (loaded); 23 tons (empty)
- Length: 50 feet (15 m)
- Beam: 14 feet (4.3 m)
- Draft: 3 feet (0.91 m) (forward); 4 feet (1.2 m) (aft)
- Speed: 8 knots (9.2 mph) (loaded); 11 knots (13 mph) (empty)
- Armament: two .50-cal M2 Browning machine guns
- Crew: 4
- Capacity: One 30-ton tank (e.g. M4 Sherman), 60 troops, or 60,000 lb (27,000 kg) of cargo

=== LCM (4) ===
In 1943 and 1944, seventy-seven LCM(4)s were built. Externally, the LCM(4) resembled a late model LCM(1) but inside the pontoon special bilge pumps and ballast tanks allowed the LCM(4) to alter trim to increase stability when partially loaded.

=== LCM (5) ===
British model of LCM

=== LCM (6) ===
The LCM (6) was an LCM (3) extended by 6 feet (1.8 m) amidships.

- Power plant:
  - 2 Detroit 6-71 diesel engines; 348 hp (260 kW) sustained; twin shaft; or
  - 2 Detroit 8V-71 diesel engines; 460 hp (340 kW) sustained; twin shaft
- Length: 56 feet (17 m)
- Beam: 14 feet (4.3 m)
- Displacement: 64 tons (65 tonnes) full load
- Speed: 9 knots (10 mph; 17 km/h)
- Range: 130 miles (210 km) at 9 knots (17 km/h)
- Military lift: 34 tons (34.6 tonnes) or 80 troops
- Crew: 5

Many LCM-6s were later adapted for the Mobile Riverine Force in the Vietnam War. Some were modified as armored troop carriers (ATCs or "Tangos"), others became "monitors" with 105 mm guns, "Zippos" with flamethrowers or "Charlie" command variants.

A few LCMs were converted to lay and repair hoses for tankers equipped with the offshore petroleum discharge system (OPDS).

=== LCM (7) ===
British model of LCM

=== LCM (8) ===
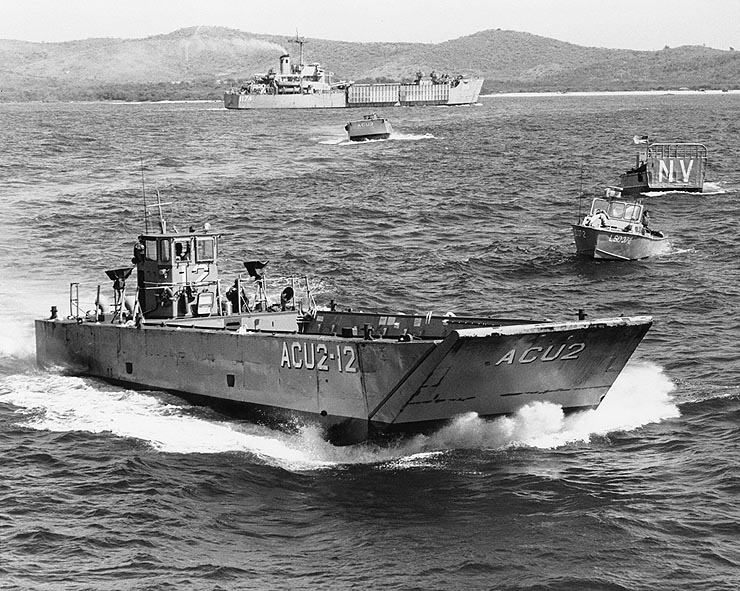
LCM-8 during landing exercises in the Caribbean in March 1972

General characteristics, LCM 8 Type

- Power plant: four 6-71 six-cylinder diesels, two hydraulic transmissions, two propeller shafts. (Lighterage Division, Naval Support Activity Danang 1969–1970) crew of 3: coxswain, bowhook, and engineer (a.k.a. "snipe")
- Power plant: 2 Detroit 12V-71 diesel engines; 680 hp (510 kW) sustained; twin shafts
- Length: 73.7 feet (22.5 m)
- Beam: 21 feet (6.4 m)
- Displacement: 105 tons (106.7 tonnes) full load
- Speed: 12 kn (14 mph; 22 km/h)
- Range: 190 nmi (350 km) at 9 knots (17 km/h) full load
- Capacity: 53.5 tons (54.4 tonnes)
- Military lift: one M48 or one M60 tank or 200 troops
- Crew: 5

== Operators ==
- Turkey – Turkish Naval Forces
- United States – United States Navy, U.S. Army 7th Transportation Brigade Expeditionary
- Thailand – Royal Thai Navy
- Australia – Royal Australian Navy
- Australia – Australian Army
- Spain – Spanish Navy
- El Salvador – Navy of El Salvador
- New Zealand – Royal New Zealand Navy
- Egypt – Egyptian Navy
- Saudi Arabia – Royal Saudi Navy
- Pakistan - Pakistan Navy
- Japan - Japan Maritime Self-Defense Force
- Vietnam - Vietnam People's Navy

=== Former operators ===
- Khmer Republic – Khmer National Navy
- South Vietnam – Republic of Vietnam Navy

== See also ==
- Motor landing craft
- Landing craft, tank
- LCVP (United States)
- LCM2000
- LCM 25 ton type - Japanese version of LCM-6
