= PF4 (disambiguation) =

PF4 encodes the cytokine platelet factor 4.

PF4 may also refer to:

- BRP Rajah Lakandula (PF-4)
- JDS Momi (PF-4)
- SpaceShipTwo powered flight 4
- USS Sausalito (PF-4)
