= USS Serene =

Minesweeper of the United States Navy

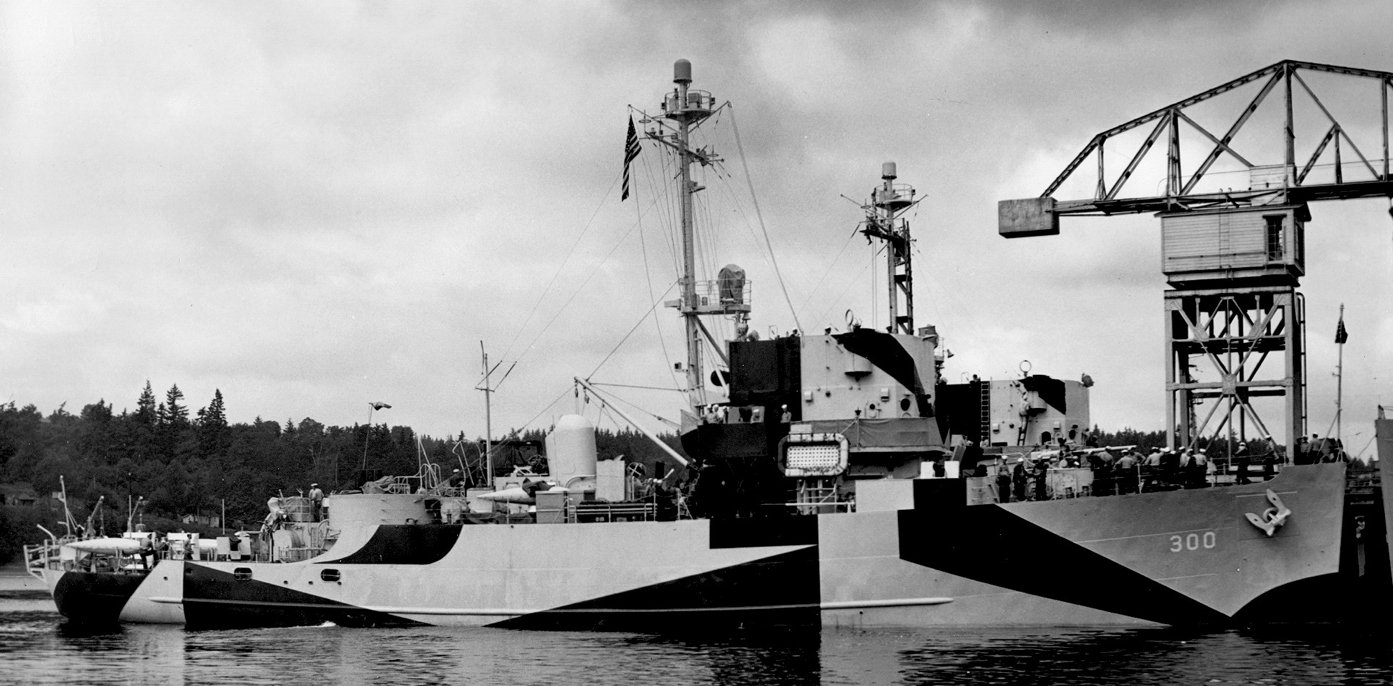
- USS Serene (AM-300)

History

United States
- Name: USS Serene
- Builder: Winslow Marine Railway and Shipbuilding Company, Seattle
- Laid down: 8 August 1943
- Launched: 31 October 1943
- Sponsored by: Miss Maxine Noblett
- Commissioned: 24 June 1944
- Decommissioned: 19 July 1946
- Reclassified: MSF-300, 7 February 1955
- Stricken: 1 August 1964
- Fate: Transferred to South Vietnam, 24 January 1964
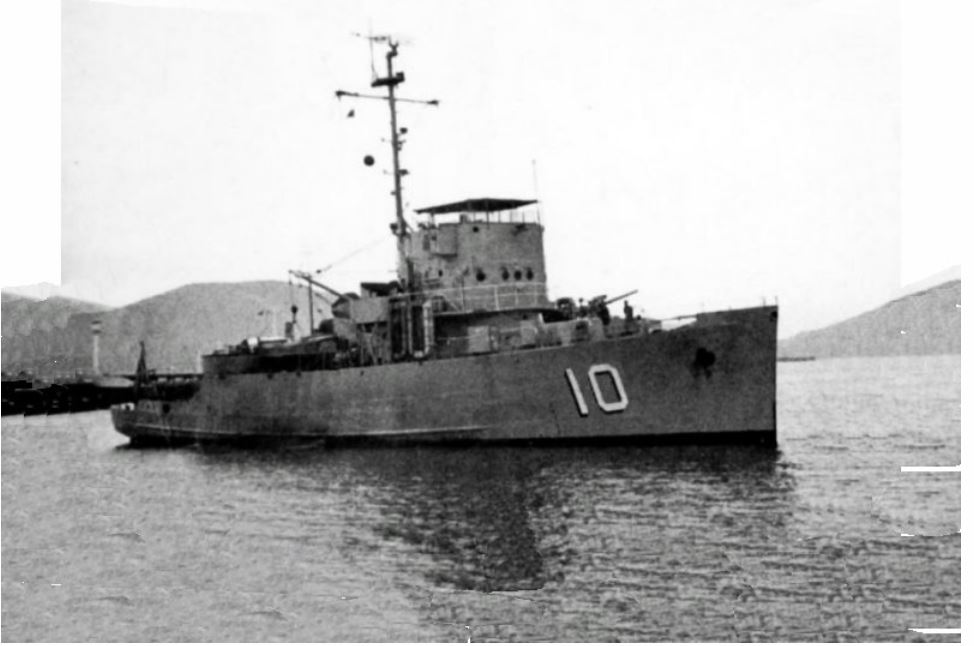
- Nhật Tảo (HQ-10)

History

South Vietnam
- Name: RVNS Nhật Tảo (HQ-10)
- Acquired: 24 January 1964
- Fate: Sunk in Battle of the Paracel Islands, 19 January 1974

General characteristics
- Class & type: Admirable-class minesweeper
- Displacement: 650 tons
- Length: 184 ft 6 in (56.24 m)
- Beam: 33 ft (10 m)
- Draft: 9 ft 9 in (2.97 m)
- Propulsion: 2 × ALCO 539 diesel engines, 1,710 shp (1.3 MW); Farrel-Birmingham single reduction gear; 2 shafts
- Speed: 14.8 knots (27.4 km/h)
- Complement: 104
- Armament: 1 × 3"/50 caliber gun; 6 × Oerlikon 20 mm cannon; 4 × Bofors 40 mm gun; 1 × Hedgehog anti-submarine mortar; 4 × Depth charge projectors; 2 × Depth charge racks; 2 × Minesweeping paravanes

Service record
- Part of: US Pacific Fleet (1944–1946); Atlantic Reserve Fleet (1946–1964); Republic of Vietnam Navy (1964–1974)
- Operations: Battle of Iwo Jima; Battle of the Paracel Islands
- Awards: 6 Battle stars

USS Serene (AM-300) was an Admirable-class minesweeper built for the United States Navy during World War II. She served in the Pacific Ocean and was awarded six battle stars. She was decommissioned and placed in reserve in 1946. In January 1964, the former Serene was transferred to South Vietnam as RVNS Nhật Tảo (HQ-10) in the Republic of Vietnam Navy. She was sunk in January 1974 during combat with Chinese forces in the Battle of the Paracel Islands.

== U.S. Navy career ==
Serene was laid down on 8 August 1943 by the Winslow Marine Railway and Shipbuilding Co. of Winslow, Washington, launched on 31 October 1943, sponsored by Miss Maxine Noblett, and commissioned on 24 June 1944. Following shakedown off southern California, Serene sailed for Pearl Harbor on 29 August. After arriving on 6 September, she performed ocean escort duty on convoy runs from Hawaiʻi to Eniwetok and San Francisco into December; then participated in fleet and type exercises until mid-January 1945. On 22 January, she got underway to escort Tractor Group Able to the Marianas to prepare for the Iwo Jima campaign.

Screening USS Terror (CM-5), flagship of TG 52.3, Serene arrived in the Volcano Islands area on 16 February and commenced sweeping operations in an area some 15 miles south of Iwo Jima. On the 17th, her division MinDiv 36, moved closer to the target area. Through the 18th they cleared the approaches to the landing beaches. As the troops landed on the 19th, the smaller YMS's were fuelled; and, from the 20th to the 28th, the minesweepers conducted anti-submarine patrols. Returning to the Marianas on 5 March, Serene departed again on the 7th and headed for Ulithi, the staging area for Operation Iceberg, the invasion of the Ryukyus.

Departing Ulithi on 19 March, she swept enemy minefields in the Kerama Retto on the 25th and 26th; then, after that anchorage was secured, participated in the sweeping operations preceding the main assault on Okinawa. On the 31st, she took up duty as a marker vessel and antisubmarine patrol ship off Kerama Retto. After the 1 April landings on the Hagushi beaches, she continued her patrol duties and provided assistance to damaged shipping. On the 6th she picked up survivors of the SS Hobbs Victory. On the 7th, she resumed sweeping operations in the sea-lanes in the Kerama Retto Okinawa area; and, at mid-month, cleared the approaches to the assault beaches on Ie Shima. On 16 April, she returned to Kerama Retto for availability; then resumed patrol and sweeping duties which she continued until sailing for Ulithi on 4 May.

On 28 May, Serene returned to the Ryukyus in the screen of convoy UOK 16. Early in June, she shifted from Nakagusuku Wan (Buckner Bay) to Kerama Retto, off which she performed patrol duty until the 7th; A week later, she resumed sweeping operations which she continued in the Mayako Jima area until the 23d. In early July, she escorted an LST convoy to Leyte where she was undergoing overhaul when hostilities ended in mid-August.

Then assigned to post-war minesweeping operations Serene swept mines in the Yellow Sea, off Korea, during late August and early September. On 7 September, her group became the Sasebo Sweep Group; and, on the 9th Serene commenced operations to clear the entrance to Nagasaki. For the remainder of the month, she continued sweeping operations off the west coast of Kyūshū. In October, she assisted in clearing the eastern end of Tsushima Strait; and, in early November, she returned to the waters off Korea to operate off the east coast in the Sea of Japan. At mid-month, she resumed operations in the Tsushima Strait to clear the shallow waters at the western end.

On 12 December, she sailed for home. Designated for inactivation Serene arrived at Galveston, Texas, on 26 January 1946. On 8 May, she shifted to Orange where she was decommissioned on 19 July and berthed with the Texas Group, Atlantic Reserve Fleet. Serene earned 3 battle stars during World War II and 3 during post-war minesweeping operations.

Reclassified MSF-300 on 7 February 1955, Serene remained in reserve until July 1963. Converted to a patrol and escort craft, she was transferred, under the Military Assistance Program, to the South Vietnam on 24 January 1964. Her name was struck from the Naval Vessel Register on 1 August 1964.

== Republic of Vietnam Navy ==
The former Serene was renamed RVNS Nhật Tảo (HQ-10) in Republic of Vietnam Navy service; Nhật Tảo translates to "serene".

On 7 August 1967, North Vietnamese forces began to overrun Coastal Group 16's base at Sông Trà Khúc River, about 70 miles southeast of Đà Nẵng. Nhật Tảo delivered heavy fire on enemy forces. USS Camp and USS Gallup arrived in support. After several hours of naval gun fire, one U.S. and two ARVN infantry companies arrived and launched a counterattack retaking the base. Nhật Tảo remained on station through the night provide continued fire support.

Nhật Tảo was sunk in early 1974 during an engagement between Republic of Vietnam Navy forces and those of the Chinese People's Liberation Army Navy in a dispute over control of the Paracel Islands. During the Battle of the Paracel Islands, Nhật Tảo took a direct hit from a ship-to-ship missile (China claims the weapon used was an RPG) on her bridge and went dead in the water. On fire with her guns silent, crew from below deck cleared the guns and renewed the fight. The Chinese again concentrated fire on Nhật Tảo and again her guns fell silent as she began to sink. A few days later, a Dutch tanker and a Vietnamese fishing boat pulled 37 survivors of the sunken Nhật Tảo out of the South China Sea.

== See also ==
- Battle of the Paracel Islands
