= LCM 25 ton type =

Japanese military landing ship

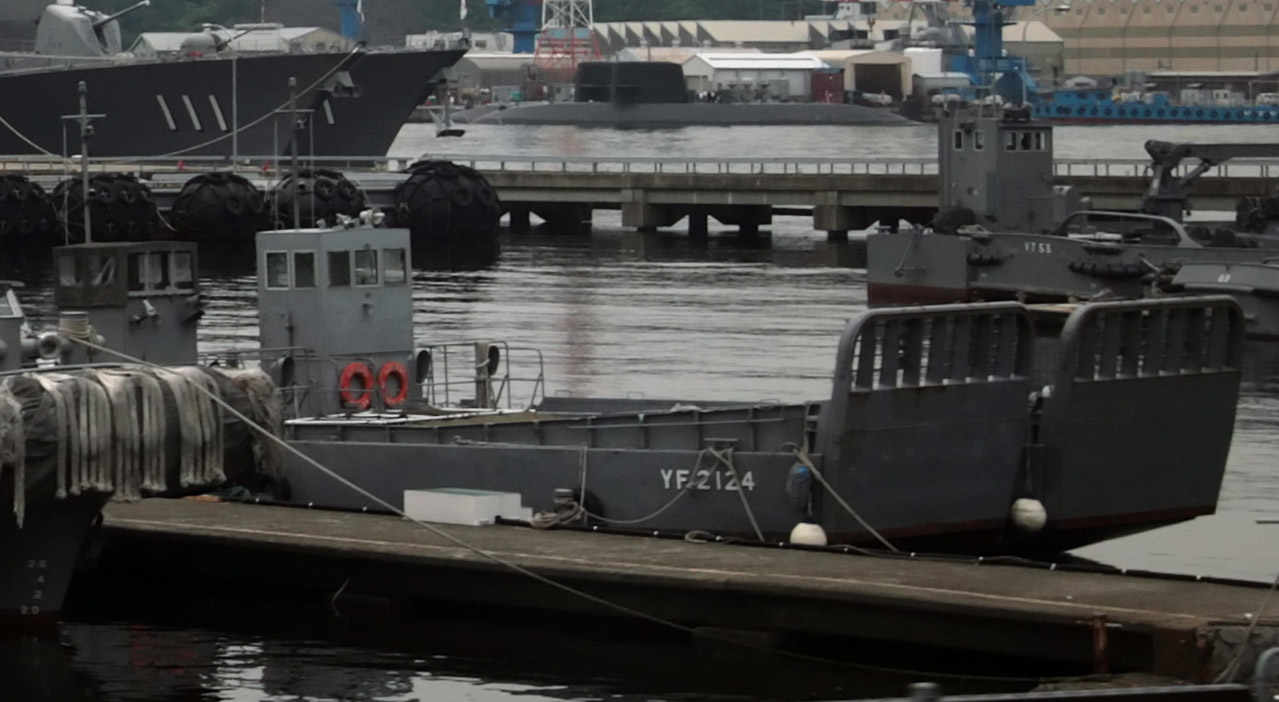
- Two Japanese LCM class ships tied up at Yokosuka naval base

Class overview
- Builders: Yokohama Yacht
- Operators: Japan Maritime Self-Defense Force
- In commission: 1992–
- Completed: 9

General characteristics
- Type: Landing craft mechanized
- Displacement: 25 long tons (25 t) standard
- Length: 17 m (55 ft 9 in)
- Beam: 4.3 m (14 ft 1 in)
- Draft: 0.7 m (2 ft 4 in)
- Installed power: 480 bhp (358 kW)
- Propulsion: 2 × Isuzu E120-MF6R diesels, 2 shafts
- Speed: 10 knots (19 km/h; 12 mph)
- Range: 130 nmi (240 km; 150 mi) at 9 knots (17 km/h; 10 mph)
- Capacity: 34 tons
- Troops: 80 troops
- Crew: 3

Japan has nine LCM 25 ton type landing ships in service with Japan Maritime Self-Defense Force. Built in Japan, the boats are similar in design to the US LCM-6 type and have similar capacity. Two larger 50 ton LCMs, built by Yokohama Yacht, were commissioned in March 2003.

== Ships in the class ==
- YF 2121
- YF 2124
- YF 2125
- YF 2127 - commissioned in March 1992
- YF 2128 - commissioned in March 1992
- YF 2129 - commissioned in March 1992
- YF 2132 - commissioned in March 1993
- YF 2135 - commissioned in March 1995
- YF 2138 - commissioned in March 1996
- YF 2141 - commissioned in March 1997

== Bibliography ==
- Saunders, Stephen, ed. (2004). Jane's Fighting Ships 2004–2005. Coulsdon, UK: Jane's Information Group. ISBN 0-7106-2623-1.
