= USS Camp =

Edsall-class destroyer escort

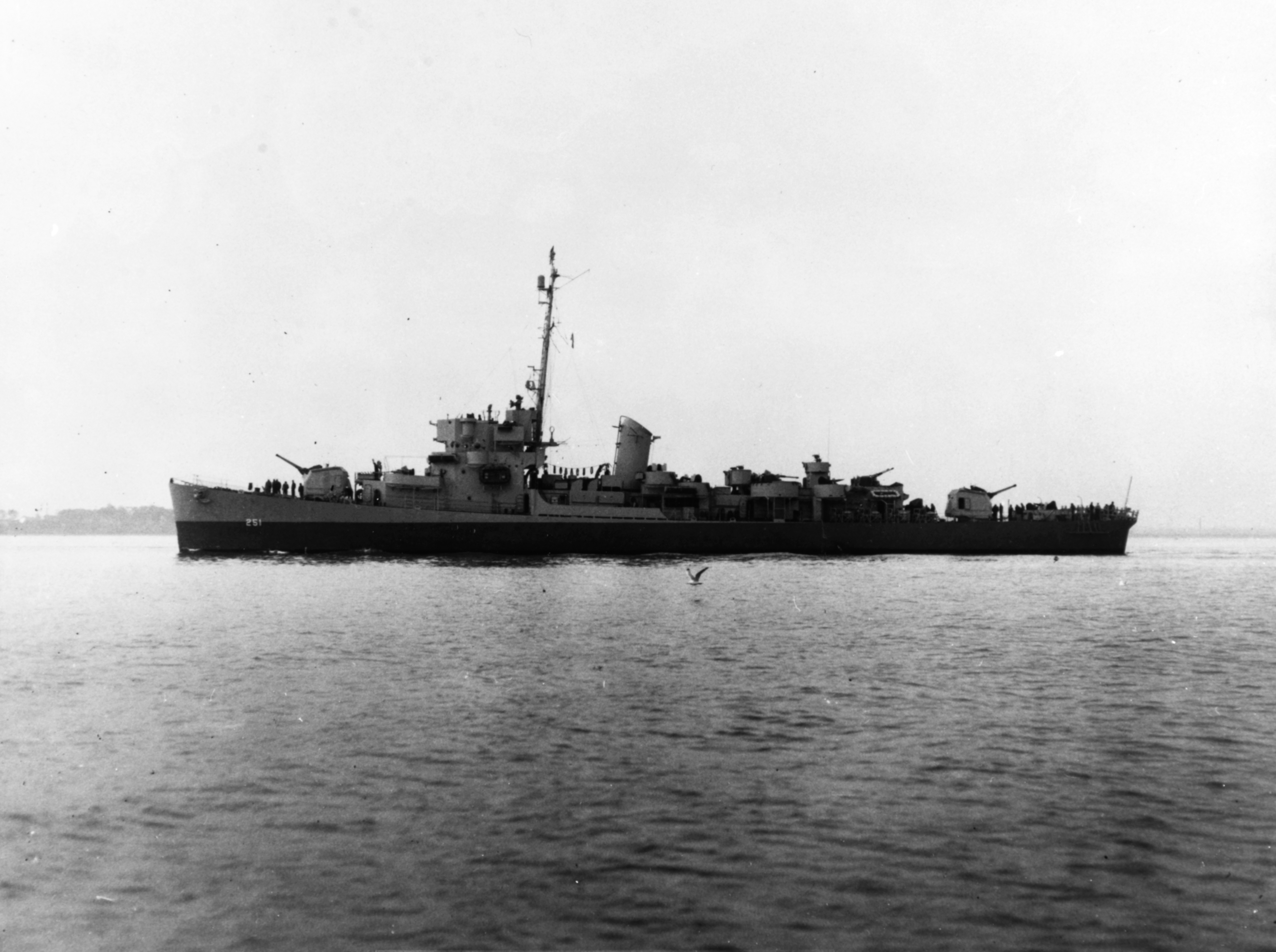
- USS Camp after refit with two 5"/38cal guns

History

United States
- Namesake: Jack Hill Camp
- Builder: Brown Shipbuilding, Houston, Texas
- Laid down: 27 January 1943
- Launched: 16 April 1943
- Commissioned: 16 September 1943
- Decommissioned: 1 May 1946
- Reclassified: DER-251, 21 October 1955
- Stricken: 30 December 1975
- Fate: Transferred to South Vietnam, 13 February 1971

South Vietnam
- Name: RVNS Tran Hung Dao (HQ-1)
- Namesake: Tran Hung Dao
- Acquired: 13 February 1971
- Fate: Escaped to the Philippines and transferred to the Philippine Navy, 5 April 1976

Philippines
- Name: RPS (later BRP) Rajah Lakandula (PF-4)
- Acquired: 5 April 1976
- Commissioned: 27 July 1976
- Decommissioned: 1988
- Stricken: 1988
- Status: Was in service in 1999 as a barracks ship, probably sold as scrap

General characteristics
- Class & type: Edsall-class destroyer escort
- Displacement: 1,253 long tons (1,273 t) standard; 1,590 long tons (1,616 t) full load
- Length: 306 ft (93 m)
- Beam: 36 ft 6 in (11.13 m)
- Draft: 10 ft 4 in (3.15 m)
- Propulsion: 4 FM diesel engines; 4 diesel-generators; 6,000 shp (4.5 MW); 2 screws
- Speed: 21 knots (39 km/h; 24 mph)
- Range: 9,000 nmi (17,000 km) at 12 kn (22 km/h; 14 mph)
- Complement: 8 officers, 201 enlisted
- Armament: 3 × single 3 in (76 mm)/50 guns; 1 × twin 40 mm AA guns; 8 × single 20 mm AA guns; 1 × triple 21 in (533 mm) torpedo tubes; 8 × depth charge projectors; 1 × depth charge projector (hedgehog); 2 × depth charge tracks

USS Camp (DE-251) was an Edsall-class destroyer escort built for the U.S. Navy during World War II. She served in the Atlantic Ocean and in the Pacific Ocean by providing destroyer escort protection against submarine and air attack for Navy vessels and convoys.

== Namesake ==
Jack Hill Camp was born on 27 August 1916 in Jennings, Louisiana. He enlisted in the United States Naval Reserve on 20 January 1941 and was appointed a naval aviator on 29 December 1941. Attached to Patrol Squadron 44, Ensign Camp was killed in action 7 June 1942 during the Battle of Midway.

== Construction and commissioning ==
Camp was launched 16 April 1943 by Brown Shipbuilding Co., Houston, Texas; sponsored by Mrs. O. H. Camp; commissioned 16 September 1943 and reported to the United States Atlantic Fleet.

== World War II North Atlantic operations ==
After duty as school ship for pre-commissioning crews for other escort vessels, Camp cleared Norfolk, Virginia, 14 December 1943, escorting a convoy bound for Casablanca with men and supplies for the operations in Italy. Camp returned to Norfolk 24 January 1944 to begin a year and a half of convoy escort operations from New York to ports of the United Kingdom, guarding convoys whose ships brought troops and mountains of equipment and supplies for the buildup and support of the assault on the European continent.

Fighting the foul weather common in the North Atlantic, Camp's alertness against submarine attack and diligence were rewarded by no losses in any of the convoys she accompanied. A collision with the tanker Chrysler's Field off the south coast of Ireland on 16 November 1944, in which one of Camp's crew members was killed, required a repair period during which Camp received a new bow and acquired 5" guns; otherwise her escort duty was uninterrupted until 19 June 1945.

== Transfer to the Pacific Fleet ==
Camp cleared Charleston, South Carolina, 9 July 1945 for the Pacific, and after serving as a training ship at Pearl Harbor, proceeded to Eniwetok for occupation duty. She supervised the evacuation of the Japanese garrison from Mili, then took on air-sea rescue duties off Kwajalein until 4 November, when she sailed for home, arriving at New York 10 December.

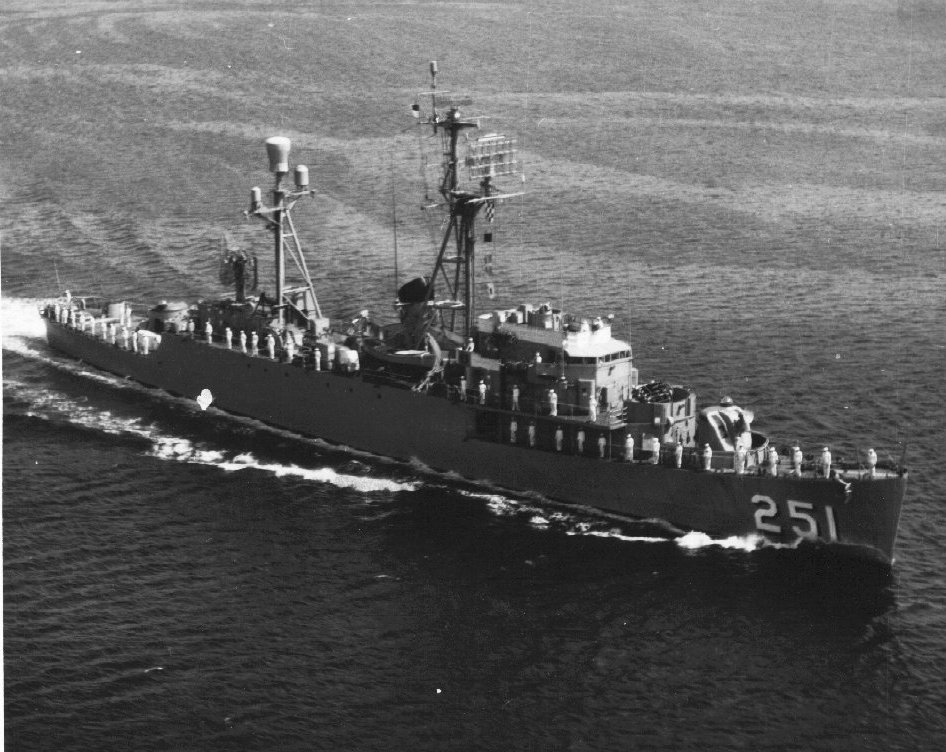
Camp postwar

== Conversion to Radar Picket Ship ==
She was decommissioned 1 May 1946 and her U.S. Coast Guard crew was removed. She was reclassified DER-251 on 7 December 1955, Camp was recommissioned 31 July 1956 for duty as radar picket ship in the early warning system. At this time, her two 5-inch 38 guns were replaced with two 3-inch 50's. She reported to Newport, Rhode Island as part of ComCorTron 16, 19 February 1957 and operated from that port to Argentia, Newfoundland and into the North Atlantic through 1962. In 1962 and 1963 the Camp operated out of Greenock, Scotland. During picket duty in the Irish sea she broke off a large section of external bilge keel. Emergency repairs were made at sea to stop the fuel oil leak. In 1964 & 1965 she served off of Cuba as a Radar Picket Ship tracking Russian Convoys and rescuing Cuban refugees that had fled the island.

== Vietnam ==
In 1965, Camp was sent to Vietnamese waters for coastal patrol and interdiction by the U.S. Navy (Operation Market Time).

On 7 August 1967, Camp was notified that the Viet Cong were overrunning the Republic of Vietnam Navy Naval Junk Base 16 on the Trà Khúc River. At flank speed, Camp sped to the aid of the Vietnamese and an American Adviser. Camp was directed to assume the duties of Operational Scene Commander and provide gunfire support as required, Arriving on the scene within the hour, Camp was unable to fire as spotters were not available and targets unidentified. As it was tactically infeasible to support a counter-offensive, Camp directed PCFs to enter the river and evacuate wounded personnel. For the next three nights, Camp provided star shell illumination to the base as it braced itself against further attack until its defenders had adequately rebuilt their defenses. At dawn on 7 August 1967, Camp was off the mouth of the Song Trà Khúc . A PCF made Camp's starboard side, her decks crowded with wounded Vietnamese. As one PCF patrol boat raced to the ship, a Vietnamese woman gave birth to a child; Camp treated 15 wounded Vietnamese including a U.S. Naval Advisor and a tiny Vietnamese baby. Camp called U.S. Army medical helicopters to the scene for evacuation of all wounded. Controlling the helicopters which hovered over the fantail hoisting aboard the injured was a delicate operation as the wounded were evacuated to a U.S. Army hospital in Quảng Ngai. In addition to the evacuated patients, Camp directed PCF's to take 25 other evacuees to Chu Lai.

Assigned to Taiwan Patrol duties in late September 1967, Camp proceeded to Kaohsiung to relieve the USS Wilhoite. After setting up her patrol barrier in the Formosa Straits, Camp found it necessary to head north at flank speed to avoid Typhoon Carla. Running into 40-foot (12 m) seas and 70 kn (81 mph; 130 km/h) winds which remained unabated for several days, Camp suffered total destruction of the forward gun shield and loss of the fire control radar system. Subsequent high seas washed the remnants of the gun shield over the side and reduced the remainder of mount 31 to mere junk. After the typhoon, she was directed to Sasebo, Japan for emergency dry-dock repairs, where an 8-foot (2.4 m) section of her hull was found nearing failure. The enclosed rear gun mount 32 was moved forward and replaced with an open gun mount from a decommissioned ship.

After the repairs, she returned to Vietnam and resumed duty which included escort support to the battleship USS New Jersey. She displayed the Naval symbol for excellence, the "E" on her bridge, for achieving high marks in all categories.

By 1968 her radio center had been rebuilt more than once to improve communications efficiency. Camp gave gunfire support when needed, provided "mothership" services to River Patrol craft and assisted Naval Operations when burial at sea or escort details were requested of her. Her communications center, which was rebuilt in 1968, became so efficient that she could hold simultaneous communications halfway around the world at the same time her local service was in heavy demand. She was used as "Station Ship" in Hong Kong harbor taking on the radio guard for all US Navy ships pulling extended stays.

During the shooting of the film Tora! Tora! Tora!, the interior scenes of the USS Ward were shot aboard the decommissioned USS Newell, while the brief at sea gun fire and depth charge scene was actually the Camp (note the open rear gun mount in the film sequence).

== Transfer to South Vietnam Navy and service with the Philippine Navy ==
She was transferred to South Vietnam on 13 February 1971. Renamed RVNS Tran Hung Dao (HQ-1), the ship was stricken from the Naval Vessel Register on 30 December 1975. Following the surrender of the South Vietnamese government on 29 April 1975, Tran Hung Dao escaped to the Philippines which acquired the ship later that year. Formally transferred on 5 April 1976, former Tran Hung Dao was commissioned into the Philippine Navy as frigate RPS Rajah Lakandula (PS-4) on 27 July 1976. In July 1980, she was renumbered and reclassified as BRP Rajah Lakandula (PF-4). Struck from the Navy List in 1988, she was still in use as stationary barracks ship in Subic Bay in 1999. Probably sold as scrap.
