= BRP Rajah Lakandula (PF-4) =

Philippine Navy frigate

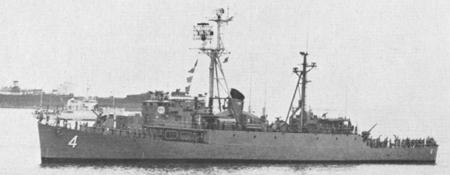
- BRP Rajah Lakandula (PF-4)

History

United States
- Name: Camp
- Builder: Brown Shipbuilding Co., Houston, Texas
- Laid down: 27 January 1943
- Launched: 16 April 1943
- Commissioned: 16 September 1943
- Recommissioned: 31 July 1956
- Renamed: USS Camp (DER-251)
- Reclassified: Radar Picket
- Stricken: 30 December 1975
- Motto: If by sea
- Fate: Transferred to Republic of Vietnam Navy on 13 February 1971.

South Vietnam
- Name: Tran Hung Dao
- Operator: Republic of Vietnam Navy
- Acquired: 13 February 1971
- Decommissioned: 1975
- Fate: Escaped to the Philippines in 1975 after the fall of South Vietnam.

Philippines
- Name: Rajah Lakandula
- Namesake: Lakandula was the native ruler of the pre-colonial Kingdom of Tondo when the Spanish colonizers first came to the island of Luzon.
- Operator: Philippine Navy
- Acquired: 5 April 1976
- Commissioned: 27 July 1976
- Decommissioned: 1988
- Stricken: 1988
- Fate: Decommissioned from the Philippine Navy in 1988, used as a stationary barracks ship as until 1999. Probably sold as scrap.

General characteristics
- Class & type: Rajah Lakandula-class destroyer escort / frigate
- Displacement: 1,200 tons standard, 1,590 tons full load
- Length: 306 ft (93 m)
- Beam: 36.83 ft (11.23 m)
- Draft: 12.25 ft (3.73 m)
- Installed power: 6,000 hp (4,500 kW)
- Propulsion: 4 × Fairbanks-Morse Mod. 38d81/8 geared diesel engines; 4 generators; 2 motors; 2 shafts
- Speed: 21 knots (39 km/h; 24 mph) (maximum)
- Range: 9,100 nmi (16,900 km; 10,500 mi) at 12 knots (22 km/h; 14 mph)
- Armament: 2 × Mk.30 5"/38 caliber gun dual purpose guns; 1 × Mk.1 Twin Bofors 40 mm gun; 8 × Mk.4 Oerlikon 20 mm cannons; 3 × Mk.15 21" Torpedo Tubes; 1 × Mk.10 Hedgehog Projector (144 rounds); 8 × Mk.6 Depth Charge Projectors; 2 × Mk.9 Depth Charge Tracks

BRP Rajah Lakandula (PF-4) was a frigate of the Philippine Navy, and was its only ex-USN Edsall-class destroyer escort. She was also the flagship of the Philippine Navy from 1981 to 1988.

== History ==
BRP Rajah Lakandula (PF-4) was originally an Edsall-class destroyer escort commissioned by the United States Navy as USS Camp (DE-251) in 1943. In 1956, she was converted to a radar picket ship and later served during the Vietnam War until being decommissioned in 1970.

She was transferred to South Vietnam on 13 February 1971. Renamed frigate RVNS Tran Hung Dao (HQ-1), the ship was stricken from the Naval Vessel Register on 30 December 1975. Following the surrender of the South Vietnamese government on 29 April 1975, Tran Hung Dao escaped to the Philippines.

She was then formally transferred to the Philippines on 5 April 1976, she was commissioned into the Philippine Navy as frigate RPS Rajah Lakandula on 27 July 1976. Received two "E" marks and conferred the Philippine Navy Ship of the Year Award for two consecutive years from 1980 to 1981. Struck from the Navy List in 1988, she was still in use as stationary barracks ship in Subic Bay as of 1999.

== Notable operations ==
On 7 October 1980, Rajah Lakandula was in the vicinity of Sangbay Island in Basilan when Gunnery Officer Ensign Albert V. Majini (PN) died in the line of duty, during an encounter while directing his gunners. Standing in the open, risking his life, he wanted to get the right range until the enemy gunfire felled him. This earned him the Philippine Medal of Valor.

In 1981, The ship, together with BRP Mactan and BRP Aurora, were part of the Philippine Navy contingent that was sent for the search and rescue efforts for survivors of the destroyer escort BRP Datu Kalantiaw (PS-76), which capsized off Calayan Islands in the northern Philippines by a typhoon.

== Technical details ==
The two Mk.30 5"/38 caliber guns, the ship's primary weapons, have a range of up to 18,200 yards (16,600 m) and are also capable of anti-aircraft warfare. USS Camp is the only one of her class to be mounted with such guns after her bows were repaired from an accident.

In addition to the above-mentioned guns, she also carries a total of one twin Mk.1 Bofors 40 mm anti-aircraft guns, and eight Mk.4 20 mm Oerlikon cannons.

== Notable popular culture ==
- BRP Rajah Lakandula was among the Philippine Navy ships who battled invading People's Liberation Army – Navy ships in Dale Brown's 1991 novel Sky Masters. In this novel, she was classified as a PF class frigate, and was equipped with a four-shot Mk141 Harpoon missile launcher.
