= Kiem Do =

Vietnam Navy officer (born 1933)

Đỗ Kiểm
- Born: 1933 (age 92–93); Hanoi, French Indochina
- Military career
- Allegiance: (South Vietnam) Republic of Vietnam
- Branch: Republic of Vietnam Navy
- Service years: 1955–1975
- Rank: Captain
- Conflicts: Vietnam War
- Other work: High school teacher, cost engineer

Đỗ Kiểm, writing as Kiem Do (Hanoi, 1933) is a former officer of the Republic of Vietnam Navy, who was serving as Deputy Chief of Staff (Operations) when Saigon fell in 1975. He secretly organised the evacuation of over 30,000 refugees aboard 32 naval ships. Kiem's efforts were ultimately successful, preventing those 32 vessels and everyone aboard from falling into the hands of North Vietnamese forces.

After transferring the Republic of Vietnam's last naval vessels to the control of the U.S. Navy, Kiem moved to the United States where he has resided since, having been granted citizenship after requesting political asylum. He worked as a teacher and cost engineer before his retirement in 1997.

== Early life ==
Kiem was born in Hanoi, and by the age of 13 was a scout for the Viet Minh, fighting for Vietnam's independence from French colonial rule. Following the end of the First Indochina War, Kiem was sent to France to be trained at the École Navale in Brest.

== Career ==
Kiem was the commander of the submarine chaser Van Don (HQ-06) during the 1963 coup. He later served as the Commandant of the Vietnamese Midshipman’s School, Chief of Staff of the Mobile Riverine Force, District Commander of the IV Naval Zone, and Deputy Chief of Staff (Operations).

With the help of Richard L. Armitage, Kiem secretly organised the evacuation of the Republic of Vietnam Navy fleet of 32 ships accompanied by several cargo ships and fishing boats with over 30,000 naval personnel and their families aboard. This fleet left Saigon on 30 April 1975, and the next day rendezvoused with USS Kirk off Côn Sơn Island to be escorted to the Philippines.

After settling in the United States after receiving political asylum, Kiem taught high school math and science, studied in the MBA program at the University of New Orleans, and worked as a cost engineer for the Louisiana utility company Entergy for more than twenty years.

== Retirement ==
Since retirement in 1997, he has been active as a leader in the New Orleans Vietnamese community and has lectured frequently on the Vietnam War at local universities and before veterans groups.

Kiem's wartime memoirs, co-authored with Julie Kane, was published in May 1998 and entitled Counterpart: A South Vietnamese Naval Officer's War.

== Family ==
He and his wife of thirty-nine years Thom Le Do, have five children, and six American-born grandchildren.
