= Hồ Tấn Quyền =

Vietnamese naval officer (1927–1963)

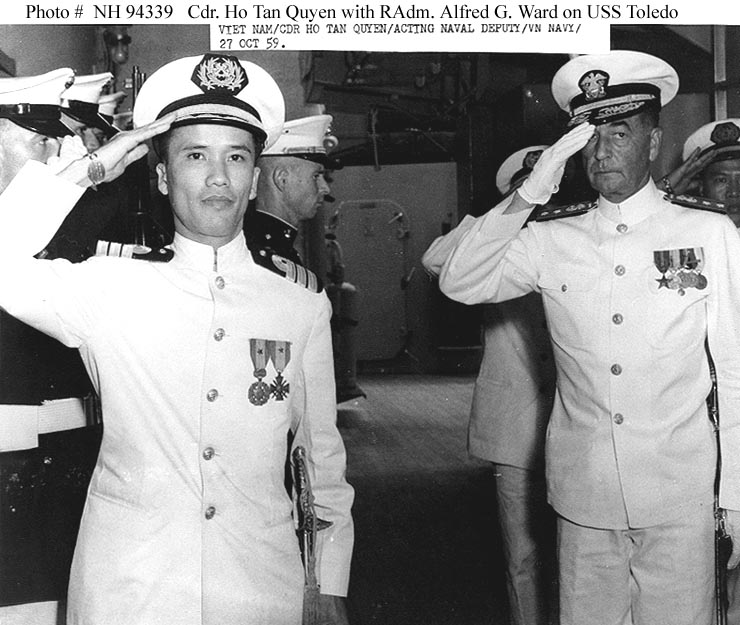
- Navy Colonel Hồ Tấn Quyền (1959)
- Born: November 1, 1927; Đà Nẵng, Annam, French Indochina
- Died: November 1, 1963 (aged 36) Saigon, South Vietnam
- Allegiance: State of Vietnam; South Vietnam
- Branch: Vietnamese National Army (South Vietnam) Republic of Vietnam Navy
- Service years: 1951–1963
- Conflicts: First Indochina War; Vietnam War; 1963 South Vietnamese coup d'état
- Spouse: Lê Thị Bích Tùng
- Children: 7

Hồ Tấn Quyền (1 November 1927 – 1 November 1963), was a senior navy officer of the Republic of Vietnam Navy with the rank of Navy Colonel. Quyền came from the first class at the Naval Officers School, which was taken over by the Government of Vietnam and established from the French Naval facility transferred to the Vietnamese Navy located in a province in the Central Coast of Vietnam. He was the third Commander of the Republic of Vietnam Navy from August 1959 until his assassination on November 1, 1963. Quyền, alongside Lê Quang Tung (Commander of the Army of the Republic of Vietnam Special Forces), was a loyalist commander of Ngo Dinh Diem.

== Biography and military career ==
Quyền was born on 1 November 1927 in Hải Châu, Đà Nẵng, into a Confucian family. His designated birthplace is in Kim Long, Hương Trà district, Thừa Thiên province. In 1947 Quyền graduated from the French program at Quoc Hoc Khai Dinh Hue High School with a full Baccalaureate degree (Part II). In August of the same year, he entered the Merchant Marine School. In December 1948, Quyền graduated as a Marine Captain, serving in this profession until joining the army.

=== Vietnamese National Army ===
At the end of 1951, Quyền and a number of marine officers were selected to join the National Army Navy which was part of the French Union Army. Quyền Attended the 1st course at Nha Trang Naval Academy which opened on 1 January 1952. With a total of 9 students, all were sent to the Arromanches aircraft carrier for professional training, then rotated. through the Far Eastern Battleships of the French Navy (because the Nha Trang Naval Training Center is under construction). In July, the whole course returned to Nha Trang to continue training. On 1 October 1952, Quyền graduated from the navy with the rank of naval lieutenant in command. After graduating, he was assigned to serve in the Volunteer Corps. On 1 October 1953, Quyền was promoted to naval lieutenant holds the position of Deputy Commander of the Volunteer Corps. In July 1954, he was promoted to naval captain, received and became the first captain of the Jiangsu HQ-535, which was transferred by the French Navy to the Vietnamese Navy.

=== Republic of Vietnam Navy ===
On 26 October 1956, after a year of service in the National Army, Quyền went on to serve the Republic of Vietnam Navy where he was promoted to the rank of Navy Major to assume the position of Commander of the Dau Hai area. At this time, he, along with Colonel Linh Quang Viên, were observers of the Southeast Asian Inter-Defense Navy exercise on the aircraft carrier Enterprise for 15 days from Singapore to Subic Bay Philippines. By mid-1957, he was appointed Chief of Staff in the Navy Command led by Major Trần Văn Chơn as Commander.

In August 1959, Quyền was appointed as Navy Commander, replacing Major Trần Văn Chơn, who was sent to study at the Naval War College in the United States. In October 1959, he was promoted to the rank of Lieutenant Colonel in the Navy. He was very loyal to President Ngô Đình Diệm. In the mid-1960s, he established the Marine Force to prevent the infiltration of people and weapons by the North Vietnamese Army.

On 11 November 1960, the Republic of Vietnam Airborne Division led a coup to overthrow the Diệm government, but Quyền supported forces loyal to Diệm and the coup eventually collapsed. On 27 February 1962, when two pilots, Lieutenant Nguyễn Văn Cử and Lieutenant Phạm Phú Quốc, bombed the Independence Palace, he directed Navy warships to shoot down the attacking aircraft and they successfully shot down Quốc who was then captured by an RVNN patrol. Soon afterwards, he was promoted to the rank of Captain. On 3 January 1963, Quyền was appointed as Commander of the operation "Waves of love", to pacify and secure the people in Nam Can, Ca Mau.

On 1 November 1963, a number of senior officers successfully organized a coup against Diệm. At 9:45 a.m. on 1 November, Quyền was travelling on the Bien Hoa highway heading to Thu Duc, with two Navy officers under his command, Major Trương Học Lực, Commander of Region 3 Rivers and Captain Nguyễn Kim Hương Giang, commander of the 24th Volunteer Corps and commander Đoàn Giang Vận. These two officers were ordered by the generals leading the coup to remove him from the position of Commander of the Navy, so they tricked him into going to Thủ Đức and killed him in the rubber forest. Immediately after, the Revolutionary Military Council, chaired by General Dương Văn Minh, appointed Colonel Chung Tấn Cang to the position of Commander of the Navy.

== Family ==
- Wife: Lê Thị Bích Tùng
- Seven children (one son, six daughters) Hồ Tấn Bích Thuỷ (Chief, Professor of French Literature), Hồ Tấn Bích Tiên, Hồ Tấn Bích Trà, Hồ Tấn Bích Thư, Hồ Tấn Bích Tuyền, Hồ Tấn Bích Trang, and Hồ Tấn Phú Quốc.
