= USS Bering Strait =

Tender of the United States Navy

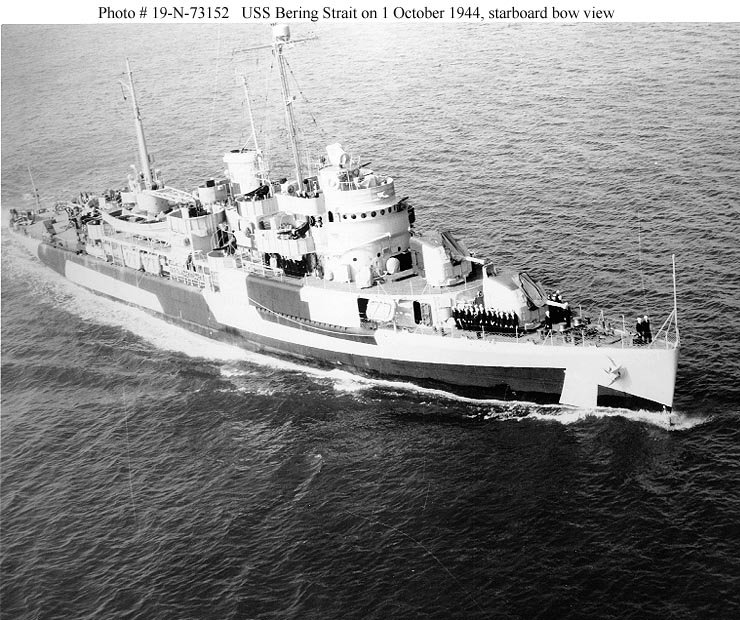
- USS Bering Strait (AVP-34) on 1 October 1944

History

United States
- Name: USS Bering Strait
- Namesake: The Bering Strait, connecting the Arctic Ocean and Bering Sea
- Builder: Lake Washington Shipyard, Houghton, Washington
- Laid down: 6 June 1943
- Launched: 15 January 1944
- Sponsored by: Mrs. George F. Cornwall
- Commissioned: 19 July 1944
- Decommissioned: 21 June 1946
- Stricken: 26 September 1966
- Honors and awards: Three battle stars for World War II service
- Fate: Loaned to U.S. Coast Guard 14 September 1948; Permanently transferred to Coast Guard 26 September 1966

United States
- Name: USCGC Bering Strait (WAVP-382)
- Namesake: Previous name retained
- Acquired: Loaned by United States Navy14 September 1948; Transferred permanently to Coast Guard 26 September 1966
- Commissioned: 14 December 1948
- Reclassified: High endurance cutter, WHEC-382, 1 May 1966
- Decommissioned: 1 January 1971
- Fate: Transferred to South Vietnam 1 January 1971

South Vietnam
- Name: RVNS Trần Quang Khải (HQ-02)
- Namesake: Trần Quang Khải (1241–1294), a Trần dynasty general
- Acquired: 1 January 1971
- Fate: Fled to Philippines on collapse of South Vietnam April 1975; Formally sold to Republic of the Philippines 5 April 1976

Philippines
- Name: BRP Diego Silang (PF-9)
- Namesake: Filipino revolutionary Diego Silang y Andaya (1730–1763)
- Acquired: April 1975; Formally purchased 5 April 1976
- Commissioned: 1980
- Decommissioned: June 1985
- Recommissioned: as BRP Diego Silang (PF-14) 1987
- Decommissioned: April 1990
- Fate: Discarded July 1990; probably scrapped

General characteristics (seaplane tender)
- Class & type: Barnegat-class small seaplane tender
- Displacement: 1,766 tons (light); 2,750 tons (full load)
- Length: 311 ft 8 in (95.00 m)
- Beam: 41 ft 1 in (12.52 m)
- Draft: 13 ft 6 in (4.11 m)
- Installed power: 6,000 hp (4,500 kW)
- Propulsion: Diesel engines, two shafts
- Speed: 18.6 knots (34.4 km/h)
- Complement: 215 (ship's company); 376 (including aviation unit)
- Sensors & processing systems: Radar, sonar
- Armament: 1 × single 5 in (130 mm) 38-caliber dual-purpose gun mount; 1 × quad 40-mm antiaircraft gun mount; 2 × dual 40-mm antiaircraft gun mounts; 4 × dual 20 mm AA gun mounts; 2 × depth charge tracks
- Aviation facilities: Supplies, spare parts, repairs, and berthing for one seaplane squadron; 80,000 US gallons (300,000 L) aviation fuel

General characteristics (Coast Guard cutter)
- Class & type: Casco-class cutter
- Displacement: 2,498 tons (full load) in 1964
- Length: 311 ft 7 in (94.97 m) overall; 299 ft 11 in (91.41 m) between perpendiculars
- Beam: 41 ft 0 in (12.50 m) maximum
- Draft: 13 ft 1 in (3.99 m) maximum in 1964
- Installed power: 6,400 bhp (4,800 kW)
- Propulsion: Fairbanks-Morse geared diesel engines, two shafts; 165,625 US gallons (626,960 L) of fuel
- Speed: 17.3 knots (32.0 km/h) (maximum sustained in 1966); 10.0 knots (18.5 km/h) (economic in 1966)
- Range: 10,138 nautical miles (18,776 km) at 17.3 knots (32.0 km/h) in 1966; 20,000 nautical miles (37,000 km) at 10.0 knots (18.5 km/h) in 1966
- Complement: 151 (10 officers, 3 warrant officers, 138 enlisted personnel) in 1966
- Sensors & processing systems: Radars in 1966 (one each): AN/SPA-4A; AN/SPS-23; ID-445/SPS; IP-307/SPS; IP-452/SPS; Mark 34 M11; AN/SPS-29B; AN/UPA-24A; AN/UPX-1A
- Armament: In 1966: 1 × single 5-inch (127 mm) 38-caliber Mark 12-1 gun mount; Mark 57 M4 director; Mark 4 M4 fire control radar; 2 × .50-caliber (12.7 mmm) machine guns; 1 × Mark 10-1 antisubmarine projector; 2 × Mark 32 Mod 2 torpedo launchers with 3 torpedo tubes each)

General characteristics (Republic of Vietnam Navy frigate)
- Class & type: Trần Quang Khải-class frigate
- Displacement: 1,766 tons (standard); 2,800 tons (full load)
- Length: 310 ft 9 in (94.72 m) (overall); 300 ft 0 in (91.44 m) waterline
- Beam: 41 ft 1 in (12.52 m)
- Draft: 13 ft 5 in (4.09 m)
- Installed power: 6,080 hp (4,534 kW)
- Propulsion: 2 × Fairbanks Morse 38D diesel engines
- Speed: approximately 18 knots (maximum)
- Complement: approximately 200
- Armament: 1 × 5-inch/38-caliber (127 mm) dual-purpose gun; 1 or 2 x 81 mm mortars in some ships; Several machine guns

General characteristics (Philippine Navy frigate)
- Class & type: Andrés Bonifacio-class frigate
- Displacement: 1,766 tons (standard); 2,800 tons (full load)
- Length: 311.65 ft (94.99 m)
- Beam: 41.18 ft (12.55 m)
- Draft: 13.66 ft (4.16 m)
- Installed power: 6,200 hp (4,600 kW)
- Propulsion: 2 × Fairbanks Morse 38D8 1/8 diesel engines
- Speed: 18.2 knots (33.7 km/h; 20.9 mph) (maximum)
- Range: 8,000 nautical miles (15,000 km) at 15.6 knots (28.9 km/h)
- Sensors & processing systems: Sperry SPS-53 Surface Search Radar; Westinghouse AN/SPS-29 Air Search Radar; Mk.26 Mod.1 Fire Control System; Mk.52 Mod.3 Gun Director
- Armament: 2 × Mk.12 5"/38 caliber gun (127 mm) dual purpose gun; 2 × Mk.1 Twin Bofors L/60 40 mm AA guns; 2 × Mk.3 Single Bofors L/60 40 mm AA guns; 4 × Twin Oerlikon 20 mm cannon; 4 × M2 Browning .50-caliber (12.7 mm) general purpose machine guns; 2 × 81 mm Mortars
- Aircraft carried: None permanently assigned; helipad could accommodate one MBB Bo 105 Helicopter
- Aviation facilities: Helipad; no support capability

USS Bering Strait (AVP-34) was a United States Navy Barnegat-class small seaplane tender in commission from 1944 to 1946. She tended seaplanes during World War II in the Pacific in combat areas and earned three battle stars by war's end.

After her U.S. Navy career ended, the ship served in the United States Coast Guard as the cutter USCGC Bering Strait (WAVP-382), later WHEC-382, from 1948 to 1971, seeing service in the Vietnam War. The Coast Guard decommissioned her at the beginning of 1971, and she was transferred to South Vietnam and served in the Republic of Vietnam Navy as the frigate RVNS Trần Quang Khải (HQ-02) until South Vietnam's collapse at the end of the Vietnam War in April 1975. She fled to the Philippines, where she was incorporated into the Philippine Navy, in which she served from 1980 to 1985 as the frigate BRP Diego Silang (PF-9) and as BRP Diego Silang (PF-14) from 1987 to 1990.

== Construction and commissioning ==
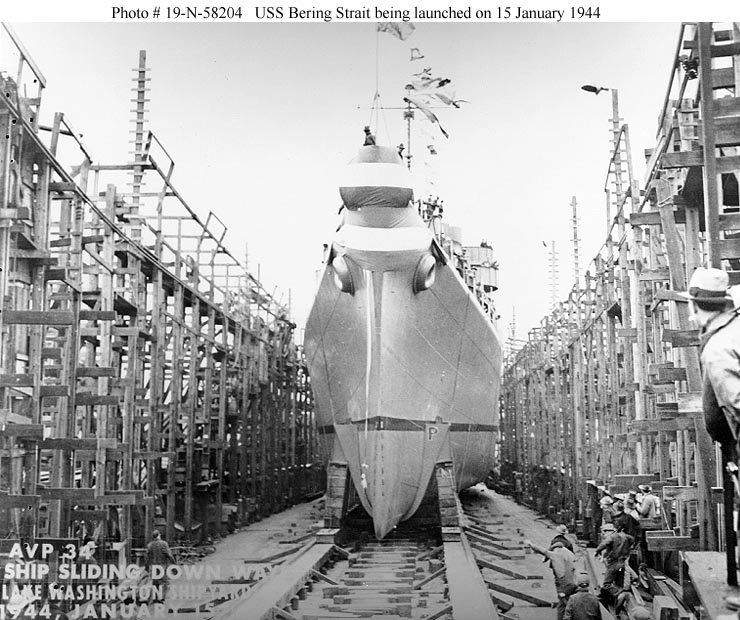
USS Bering Strait (AVP-34) is launched at Lake Washington Shipyard, Houghton, Washington, on 15 January 1944.

Bering Strait was laid down on 7 June 1943 at Houghton, Washington, by Lake Washington Shipyard. She was launched on 15 January 1944, sponsored by Mrs. George F. Cornwall, and commissioned at her builder's yard on 19 July 1944.

== United States Navy service ==
After fitting out and conducting her initial sea trials in Puget Sound, Bering Strait departed Seattle, Washington, on 10 August 1944. She reached Naval Air Station Alameda at Alameda, California, on 13 August 1944. From 17 August 1944 to 13 September 1944, she conducted her shakedown, covering areas such as ship control, communications, general drills, engineering and damage control instruction, gunnery training, and antiaircraft and antisubmarine work. Proceeding to Los Angeles, California, upon completion of that training, Bering Strait underwent two weeks of repairs and alterations at Terminal Island Naval Drydocks at Terminal Island, California.

=== World War II ===
==== Training operations in Hawaii ====
Reporting for duty with the United States Pacific Fleet on 2 October 1944, Bering Strait sailed for the Hawaiian Islands on 3 October 1944. She arrived at Pearl Harbor, Hawaii, on 9 October, and on 13 October 1944 sailed for Hilo, Hawaii. Arriving there on 14 October, she established a seaplane base at Kuhio Bay and, until 5 November, carried out training with successive detachments of Glenn L. Martin Company PBM Mariner flying boats. She tended six Martin PBM-3Ds from Patrol Bombing Squadron 25 (VPB-25) from 14 to 19 October 1944 and a second detachment of six PBM-3Ds from the same squadron between 19 and 29 October 1944, after which time she tended six Mariners from Patrol Bombing Squadron 26 (VPB-26). Concluding those advanced base activities on 5 November 1944, she sailed for Naval Air Station Kaneohe Bay at Kaneohe, Hawaii, the same day.

Arriving at her destination on the 6th, Bering Strait received orders to organize and train an air-sea rescue task group made up of herself and the seaplane detachment of Rescue Squadron 2 (VH-2), an assignment that required her to exchange her aviation spare parts allowance for PBM-3D Mariner patrol bombers for spares for PBM-3R Mariner rescue aircraft. Returning to Pearl Harbor on 23 November 1944, Bering Strait underwent a shipyard availability and then loaded the equipment of Rescue Squadron 3 (VH-3), which had been substituted for VH-2.

==== Operations in the Marshall Islands ====
Bering Strait sailed for the Marshall Islands on 1 December 1944. During the passage to Kwajalein Atoll, the ship served as antisubmarine screen for the seaplane tender USS Cumberland Sound.

After pausing at Kwajalein from 9 to 12 December, Bering Strait returned to sea again with Cumberland Sound and steamed to Eniwetok, arriving there on 13 December 1944 to carry out air-sea rescue training, which began after VH-3 arrived from Kaneohe on 15 December. She conducted nine days of training with VH-3 before that squadron transferred to Cumberland Sound on 24 December 1944.

Bering Strait, along with the patrol craft USS PC-1082 and USS PC-572, then escorted the cargo ship USS Situla and six merchant ships from Eniwetok to Saipan in the Mariana Islands, departing on 24 December 1944.

==== Operations in the Mariana Islands ====
Bering Strait and her convoy arrived on 28 December 1944 at Garapan Harbor on Saipan. Shifting on 29 December 1944 to Tanapag Harbor, Saipan, she received VH-3 on board that day.

On 1 January 1945, however, Bering Strait transferred her aviation maintenance unit to VH-3 for temporary duty and sent her aviation officer, aviation storekeepers, all aviation spare parts, and three of her boats to the naval air base at Tanapag, so that the organization could be maintained intact ashore. That day, she reported to Commander, Marianas Patrol and Escort Force, for temporary operational control for radar picket and air-sea rescue duty. She departed Tanapag Harbor on 5 January 1945 to take up her new task.

From 6 to 15 January 1945, Bering Strait operated 10 nautical miles (19 km) west of Sarigan and Guguan Islands, on radar picket station to warn Saipan of approaching Japanese planes. Returning to Saipan for logistics on 16 January 1945, she embarked a fighter-director officer from a United States Marine Corps aircraft group on 18 January 1945, and departed later that day to assume radar picket duties as fighter-director ship in Operation Michigan to intercept Japanese planes operating between Iwo Jima and Truk.

Returning to Saipan on 28 January 1945 for logistics and to disembark the U.S. Marine Corps fighter-direction officer, Bering Strait commenced a six days of voyage repairs. On 4 February 1945, she sailed to relieve the destroyer USS Fanning on air-sea rescue lifeguard station.

At 23:00 hours on 10 February 1945, Bering Strait made contact with a homeward-bound Boeing B-29 Superfortress, first by radar and then visually. The ship switched on her lights and stood by for a landing, illuminating the sea and then indicating the wind direction with searchlights. The B-29, named Deacon's Delight, accomplished "an almost perfect ditching," and Bering Strait's motor whaleboat took the entire 12-man crew on board and brought them to the ship. Then, after collecting floating debris and gear, and riddling the Superfortress with gunfire in a vain effort to sink it, Bering Strait rammed and sank the hardy bomber.

An hour earlier, Bering Strait had picked up a report that another B-29, named Homing Bird, had ditched. After completing the rescue of Deacon's Delight's crew, the ship headed for the scene of Homing Bird's crash. Guided to the scene by a "Dumbo" air-sea rescue aircraft the ship arrived there by 16:05 hours on 11 February 1945 and picked up the entire 11-man crew immediately.

Work still remained to be done, however, for soon after winding up the rescue of Homing Bird's crew, Bering Strait received orders to rendezvous with the high-speed minelayer USS Robert H. Smith, to pick up the crew of a Superfortress that had ditched around 22:30 hours on 10 February 1945. The violent landing had claimed the lives of four of the B-29's crew. A patrolling "Dumbo" spotted the men the next morning, dropped survival gear, and covered them until Robert H. Smith picked them up that afternoon. On the morning of 12 February 1945, Bering Strait embarked the seven survivors of the third B-29. Returning to Saipan on 15 February, the ship disembarked the airmen the same day.

On the night of Bering Strait's return to her station, on 19 February 1945, a B-29 had ditched at 21:00, 12 nautical miles (22 km) north of Pagan Island, but broke up and sank upon landing; five men, trapped in the wreckage, had drowned. Unable to extract all of the life rafts – one man had the use of only a partially inflated rubber boat – the crew lay at the mercy of the sea. Directed to the scene by a "Dumbo," Bering Strait sighted the survivors and hove to in their midst. She picked up five men, one of whom had been swimming without a life jacket for two hours, and sighted two bodies but could not recover them. Fortunately, the airmen had been spotted in the darkness because of tiny lights pinned to their life jackets, lights that had been "stolen" from the Navy "on personal initiative." Bering Strait disembarked those survivors at Saipan on 21 February 1945, and got underway later the same day to relieve the destroyer USS Cummings on lifeguard station.

Returning to Saipan on 3 March 1945, Bering Strait spent the next six days in a shipyard availability before setting out to resume her lifeguard work on 9 March.

USS Bering Strait (AVP-34) rescues the crew of the B-29 Superfortress Hopeful Devil on 10 March 1945.

On 10 March, Bering Strait established contact with a B-29, nicknamed Hopeful Devil, that radioed a distress call during its return from a bombing mission over the Japanese home islands. The Superfortress ditched alongside at 12:38 hours, and Bering Strait picked up the nine-man crew in short order. Almost immediately, Bering Strait picked up a position report on another ditched B-29, and steered a course to the rescue. Although the position reports provided the ship proved incorrect because a "Dumbo" pilot mistook Guguan Island for Alamagan, Bering Strait spotted a "Dumbo" orbiting 10 nautical miles (19 km) southwest of Guguan and altered course to investigate. She picked up the 11-man crew of that ditched B-29 and then shaped a course for her lifeguard station.

Bering Strait remained at sea, 28 nautical miles (52 km) from Pagan Island, from 11 to 14 March 1945, at which time she relieved her sister ship, the seaplane tender USS Cook Inlet at another air-sea rescue station. Returning to Saipan for logistics on 16 March 1945, Bering Strait disembarked the 20 airmen taken on board since 10 March 1945 before sailing for Guam.

Bering Strait's performance of her rescue function earned her accolades from the Commanding General of the United States Army Air Forces 313th Bombardment Wing who, upon the ship's detachment from lifeguard duties, sent her a message: "Since you have been our guardian angel of the seas you have returned safely to us 50 combat crewmen. Many of them are flying against the enemy again. We are grateful for the splendid work you have done and wish you all the best of luck."

=== Invasion of Okinawa ===
On 18 March 1945, Bering Strait began preparations for Operation Iceberg, the invasion of Okinawa. Underway on 19 March 1945, she escorted the seaplane tender USS Hamlin to Saipan and completed the preparations for "Iceberg" by loading VH-3 equipment between 20 and 23 March 1945. This work accomplished, she sailed for Kerama Retto on 23 March 1945 in company with three large seaplane tenders and three of her sister ships, as Task Group (TG) 51.20.

Reaching her destination on 28 March 1945, Bering Strait anchored in the Kerama Retto passage, and TG 51.20 established a seaplane base that day. The next day, VH-3 arrived and flew its first "Dumbo" mission.

On "L-day," 1 April 1945, the invasion of Okinawa commenced. The first "Dumbo" mission of the invasion for VH-3 proved successful, as the squadron commander, Lieutenant Commander W. H. Bonvillian, rescued the three-man crew of a Grumman TBF Avenger torpedo bomber from Torpedo Squadron 29 (VT-29). Antiaircraft fire had brought the plane down in a rice paddy, and the three crewmen deemed it prudent to take to their rubber boat and head out to sea where Lieutenant Commander Bonvillian's Mariner picked them up.

For the next three months, Bering Strait served as the coordinating control tender at Kerama Retto, not only tending seaplanes but also conducting sonar searches to guard against midget submarine incursions. Planes under her direction carried out 268 missions during April, May, and June 1945, rescuing 105 men from 39 different squadrons – 26 U.S. Navy, ten U.S. Marine Corps, two U.S. Army Air Forces, and one British Fleet Air Arm. The aircraft carrier-based squadrons among that number came from 23 ships, including the British fleet carrier HMS Formidable.

Twice during April 1945, one of Bering Strait's planes was forced down by friendly fire and compelled to taxi back to base. On 23 April 1945, one of her PBMs transferred a severely wounded U.S. Marine to the seaplane tender USS St. George for medical treatment. A little over a month later, on 24 May 1945, her PBMs rescued a pilot from the waters at the mouth of Ariake Bay, on southern Kyūshū. Similar rescues took place on 2 June 1945, when Bering Strait-based PBMs rescued the crew of a crashed PB2Y Coronado from inside Kagoshima Bay, as well as a pilot from the fleet carrier USS Ticonderoga. Later that month, on 14 June 1945, Bering Strait-based Mariners rescued pilots under fire from Japanese guns at Kikai Shima in the northern Ryukyu Islands.

Pilots and aircrew proved not the only beneficiaries of Bering Strait's controlled rescue missions. On 27 May 1945, two kamikaze suicide aircraft crashed the destroyer USS Braine. One Bering Strait-based PBM rescued ten men from the ship while a second stood by in case the need arose to fly critically hurt sailors to medical treatment. On other occasions, Bering Strait's planes escorted damaged aircraft to safety, or directed ships to the assistance of survivors in the water.

The ship's stay at Kerama Retto likewise proved eventful, as, during that three-month period the ship went to general quarters 154 times; there was one day, 6 June 1945, on which the ship stood to battle stations six times. On 5 May 1945, two of her men suffered injuries when hit by shrapnel from friendly fire bursting too close to the ship during an attack by Japanese planes; she herself then fired on a Japanese plane attempting to crash on the nearby St. George. On 21 June, Bering Strait's guns shot down a Nakajima E4N Type 00 (Allied reporting name "Jake") reconnaissance floatplane. During that same raid, just after one kamikaze had crashed the seaplane tender USS Curtiss, a second overflew Bering Strait and headed for the seaplane tender USS Kenneth Whiting. Bering Strait took the kamikaze under fire and shot it down short of Kenneth Whiting.

Relieved of her duties as coordinating control tender on 30 June 1945, Bering Strait shifted to Chimu Bay, Okinawa, on 15 July. She tended four PBMs from VH-3 until 7 August, when she transferred them to another seaplane tender and assumed duties tending six planes from Rescue Squadron 1 (VH-1). Twice during her first months at Chimu Bay weather compelled her to undertake typhoon evasion, once from 19 to 20 July 1945 and again between 1 and 3 August 1945.

Hostilities with Japan ended on 15 August 1945, bringing World War II to a close, while Bering Strait was operating at Chimu Bay.

==== Honors and awards ====
Bering Strait was awarded three battle stars for her World War II service.

=== Post-World War II ===
Departing Okinawa on 26 September 1945, Bering Strait headed for Japan to support the occupation of that country. Reaching Sasebo, Japan, soon thereafter, she remained at that port until her sister ship Cook Inlet relieved her on 30 December 1945, then departed for the United States. Proceeding via Pearl Harbor, Bering Strait reached San Francisco, California, on 21 January 1946 and commenced pre-inactivation overhaul.

=== Decommissioning ===
Bering Strait was decommissioned at Naval Air Station Alameda, California, on 21 June 1946 and placed in the Pacific Reserve Fleet.

== United States Coast Guard service ==
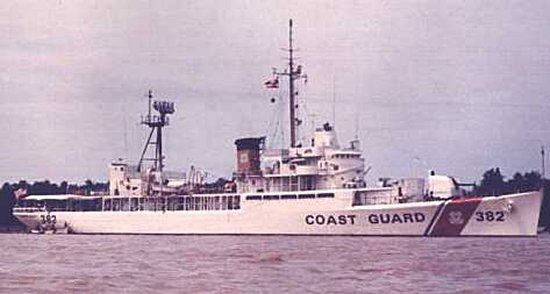
USCGC Bering Strait (WHEC-382), sometime after the Coast Guard's 1967 adoption of the "racing stripe" markings on its ships.

Barnegat-class ships were very reliable and seaworthy and had good habitability, and the Coast Guard viewed them as ideal for ocean station duty, in which they would perform weather reporting and search and rescue tasks, once they were modified by having a balloon shelter added aft and having oceanographic equipment, an oceanographic winch, and a hydrographic winch installed. After World War II, the Navy transferred 18 of the ships to the Coast Guard, in which they were known as the Casco-class cutters.

The Navy loaned Bering Strait to the United States Coast Guard on 14 September 1948. After undergoing conversion for Coast Guard use, she was commissioned into the Coast Guard on 14 December 1948 as USCGC Bering Strait (WAVP-382).

=== Pacific operations 1948–1967 ===
Bering Strait was stationed at Seattle, Washington, beginning on 14 December 1948. Her primary duty during her Coast Guard service was to serve on ocean stations in the Pacific Ocean to gather meteorological data. While on duty in one of these stations, she was required to patrol a 210 square miles (540 km^{2}) area for three weeks at a time, leaving the area only when physically relieved by another Coast Guard cutter or in the case of a dire emergency. While on station, she acted as an aircraft check point at the point of no return, a relay point for messages from ships and aircraft, as a source of the latest weather information for passing aircraft, as a floating oceanographic laboratory, and as a search-and-rescue ship for downed aircraft and vessels in distress, and engaged in law enforcement operations. During her Coast Guard career she also visited places as diverse as Adak, Alaska; Yokosuka, Japan; the French Frigate Shoals, and Laysan Island.

In 1954 she was transferred to Honolulu, Hawaii, which remained her home port for the rest of her Coast Guard career, and continued her ocean station duties in the Pacific from there.

In January 1956, Bering Strait evacuated an injured seaman in need of medical assistance from the merchant ship Madaket. On 13 February 1960, she used one ton of concrete patch material that had been air-dropped to her to assist the Japanese training ship Toyama Maru in making emergency repairs off Palmyra Island.

Bering Strait conducted oceanographic experiments on Ocean Station Victor, 34N 164E, in December 1964 and January 1965. On 13 January 1965, she relieved the Coast Guard cutter USCGC Matagorda, which had been damaged while standing by the disabled Liberian merchant ship Saint Helena 1,000 nautical miles (1,900 km) northwest of Midway Atoll. While Matagorda steamed to Midway and then on to Honolulu in heavy seas, Bering Strait stood by Saint Helena, which was in danger of breaking in two, until a commercial tug arrived to assist the merchant ship.

Bering Strait was reclassified as a high endurance cutter and redesignated WHEC-382 on 1 May 1966. She again conducted oceanographic experiments at Ocean Station Victor from 19 June 1966 to 10 July 1966. Her loan period from the Navy came to an end on 26 September 1966, when she was transferred permanently from the Navy to the Coast Guard.

=== Vietnam War service 1967–1968 ===
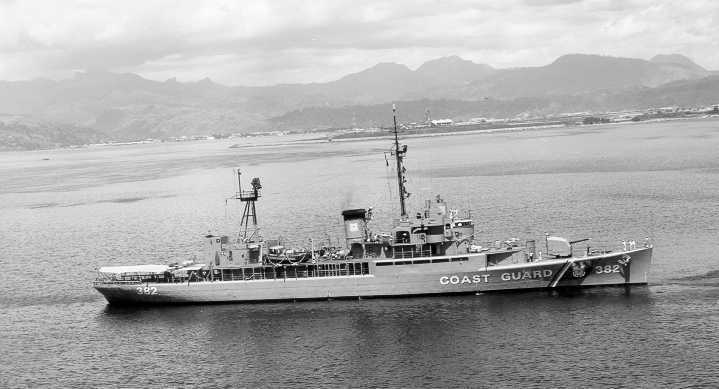
USCGC Bering Strait (WHEC-382) during her Vietnam War service.

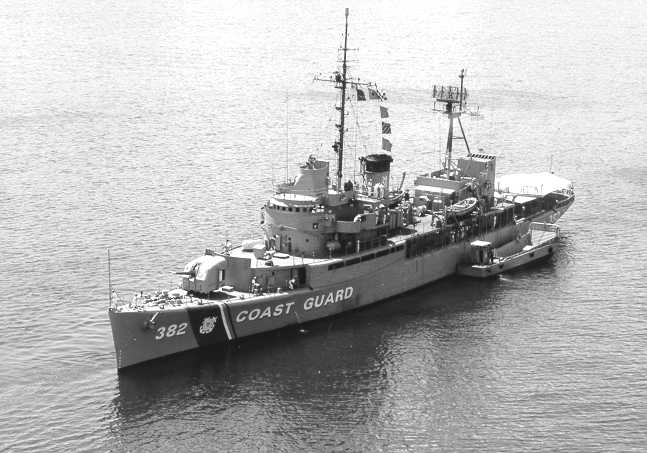
USCGC Bering Strait (WHEC-382) in Subic Bay in the Philippines in 1970 during the Vietnam War.

In 1967, Bering Strait was assigned to Coast Guard Squadron Three, which was designated Task Unit 70.8.6. The squadron was activated at Pearl Harbor, Hawaii, on 24 April 1967 when its commander, Captain John E. Day, hoisted his pennant aboard his flagship, the Coast Guard cutter USCGC Gresham.

Coast Guard Squadron Three was tasked to operate in conjunction with U.S. Navy forces in Operation Market Time, the interdiction of North Vietnamese arms and munitions traffic along the coastline of South Vietnam during the Vietnam War. The squadron's other Vietnam War duties included fire support for ground forces, resupplying Coast Guard and Navy patrol boats, and search-and-rescue operations. Serving in the squadron with Gresham and Bering Strait were cutters USCGC Yakutat, USCGC Barataria and USCGC Half Moon; like Bering Strait and Gresham, they all were former Navy Barnegat-class ships. They departed Pearl Harbor on 26 April 1967 and reported to Commander, United States Seventh Fleet, for Market Time duty on 4 May 1967. They were joined by Navy radar picket destroyer escorts (DERs) of Escort Squadrons 5 and 7.

The ten Market Time ships arrived at Subic Bay in the Philippines on 10 May 1967. The five Coast Guard cutters and five Navy destroyer escorts continuously manned four Market Time stations off Vietnam, while only Navy warships served on two Taiwan patrol stations. One ship rotated duty as the station ship in Hong Kong. Bering Strait remained in the Western Pacific until 18 February 1968, then returned to the United States.

=== Pacific operations 1968–1970 ===
Bering Strait returned to her conventional Coast Guard duties in 1968, still operating from Honolulu. From 24 February 1970 to 1 March 1970 she fought a fire on the Panamanian merchant ship Grand Ocean in the mid-Pacific.

=== Vietnam War service 1970 ===
Bering Strait returned to Coast Guard Squadron Three for service in the Vietnam War on 17 May 1970. Her second Vietnam tour of duty ended on 31 December 1970.

=== Decommissioning ===
After her antisubmarine warfare equipment had been removed, the Coast Guard decommissioned Bering Strait in South Vietnam on 1 January 1971, the day after her second Vietnam War tour ended.

== Republic of Vietnam Navy service ==
Trần Quang Khải (HQ-02) pierside at left, with her sister ships RVNS Trần Quốc Toản (HQ-06) (center) and RVNS Trần Bình Trọng (HQ-05) (right).

South Vietnam commissioned the ship into the Republic of Vietnam Navy as the frigate RVNS Trần Quang Khải (HQ-02). (Note: Other spellings encountered include Tran Quang Kha, Tran Quong Khai, and Tran Quang Khia.) (Note: Per Janes's Fighting Ships 1973–1974, p. 592, "HQ" is an abbreviation for "Hai Quan", Vietnamese for "Navy", used for all Republic of Vietnam Navy ships.) (Note: This article assumes that the authoritative Jane's Fighting Ships 1973–1974, p. 592, is correct about the ship's lineage (i.e., that she was the former USS Bering Strait (AVP-34) and USCGC Bering Strait (WAVP-382/WHEC-382) and was designated HQ-02 in South Vietnamese service; the Dictionary of American Naval Fighting Ships (DANFS) (see http://www.history.navy.mil/danfs/b5/bering-strait-i.htm) and NavSource (see http://www.navsource.net/archives/09/43/4334.htm) agree. However, much confusion exists on these points in print and on the Web. The United States Coast Guard Historian's Office (see http://www.uscg.mil/history/webcutters/BeringStrait1948.asp) agrees that the ship was the former Bering Strait, but does not mention her South Vietnamese "HQ" designation. Conway's All the World's Fighting Ships 1947–1982 Part II: The Warsaw Pact and Non-Aligned Nations, p. 369, agrees that the ship was the former Bering Strait, but claims her designation in South Vietnamese service was HQ-15, a designation that Jane's, p. 592, and DANFS say was assigned to RVNS Phạm Ngũ Lão (HQ-15), the former USS Absecon (AVP-23) and USCGC Absecon (WAVP-374/WHEC-374). Finally, the Inventory of VNN's Battle Ships Part 1 (see Part 1 at http://www.vnafmamn.com/VNNavy_inventory.html) claims that Trần Quang Khải (HQ-02) was the former USS Cook Inlet (AVP-36) and USCGC Cook Inlet (WAVP-385/WHEC-384), while the other sources (less DANFS, which does not mention Cook Inlet's South Vietnamese career) all agree that Cook Inlet became RVNS Trần Quốc Toản (HQ-06) in South Vietnamese service. Even here confusion arises, however, in that Jane's, p. 592, and NavSource claim that HQ-02 was Trần Quang Khải and HQ-06 was Trần Quốc Toản, while Conway's, p. 369, claims that HQ-02 was Trần Quốc Toản and HQ-06 was yet another ship, RVNS Ngô Quyền (HQ-17), which Jane's, p. 592, and NavSource (see http://www.navsource.net/archives/09/43/4356.htm) both say was designated HQ-17.) By mid-1972, six other former Casco-class cutters had joined her in South Vietnamese service. They were the largest warships in the South Vietnamese inventory, and their 5-inch (127-millimeter) guns were South Vietnam's largest naval guns. Trần Quang Khải and her sisters fought alongside U.S. Navy ships during the final years of the Vietnam War, patrolling the South Vietnamese coast and providing gunfire support to South Vietnamese forces ashore.

When South Vietnam collapsed at the end of the Vietnam War in late April 1975, Trần Quang Khải became a ship without a country. She fled to Subic Bay in the Philippines, packed with South Vietnamese refugees. On 22 and 23 May 1975, a U.S. Coast Guard team inspected Trần Quang Khải and five of her sister ships, which also had fled to the Philippines in April 1975. One of the inspectors noted: "These vessels brought in several hundred refugees and are generally rat-infested. They are in a filthy, deplorable condition. Below decks generally would compare with a garbage scow."

== Philippine Navy service ==
The Philippine Navy took custody of Trần Quang Khải in 1975. After she had been cleaned and repaired, the United States formally transferred her to the Philippines on 5 April 1976. Commissioned in 1980 as the frigate BRP Diego Silang (PF-9), (Note: This article assumes that the authoritative Jane's Fighting Ships 1980–1981, p. 370, is correct about the ship's lineage (i.e., that she was the former USS Bering Strait (AVP-34, USCGC Bering Strait (WAVP-382/WHEC-382), and RVNS Trần Quang Khải. However, some confusion exists. The Dictionary of American Naval Fighting Ships (see http://www.history.navy.mil/danfs/b5/bering-strait-i.htm), the Naval Historical Center Online Library of Selected Images (see http://www.history.navy.mil/photos/sh-usn/usnsh-b/avp34.htm), the United States Coast Guard Historian's Office (see http://www.uscg.mil/history/webcutters/BeringStrait1948.asp), NavSource (see http://www.navsource.net/archives/09/43/4334.htm) and Conway's All the World's Fighting Ships 1947–1982 Part II: The Warsaw Pact and Non-Aligned Nations, p. 356, all agree with Jane's that Diego Silang was the former Trần Quang Khải and Bering Strait. However, the Inventory of VNN's Battle Ships Part 2 (see Part 2 at http://www.vnafmamn.com/VNNavy_inventory2.html) claims that Diego Silang was the former RVNS Lý Thường Kiệt (HQ-16), which it in turn claims was the former Bering Strait.) she and her three sister ships of the Andrés Bonifacio class of frigates – all former Barnegat- and Casco-class ships – were the largest Philippine Navy ships of their time.

=== Modernization ===
The Andrés Bonifacio-class frigates were passed to the Philippine Navy with fewer weapons aboard than they had had during their U.S. Navy and U.S. Coast guard careers and with old surface search radars installed. The Philippine Navy addressed these shortfalls through modernization programs. In Philippine service, Diego Silang retained her South Vietnamese armament, consisting of a single Mark 12 5"/38 caliber (127-mm) gun, a dual-purpose weapon capable of anti-surface and anti-air fire, mounted in a Mark 30 Mod 0 enclosed base ring with a range of up to 18,200 yards (16,600 m) yards; two twin Mark 1 Bofors 40mm anti-aircraft gun mounts, four Mk. 4 single 20-millimeter Oerlikon anti-aircraft gun mounts, four M2 Browning .50-caliber (12.7-millimeter) general-purpose machine guns, and two 81-mm mortars. However, in 1979 Hatch and Kirk, Inc., added a helicopter deck aft which could accommodate a Philippine Navy MBB Bo 105C helicopter for utility, scouting, and maritime patrol purposes, although the ship had no capability to refuel or otherwise support visiting helicopters. The Sperry SPS-53 surface search and navigation radar also was installed, replacing the AN/SPS-23 radar, although the ship retained both its AN/SPS-29D air search radar and its Mark 26 Mod 1 Fire Control Radar System. The Philippine Navy made plans to equip Diego Silang and her sister ships with new radar systems and long-range BGM-84 Harpoon anti-ship cruise missiles, but this upgrade did not materialize due to the worsening political and economic crisis in the Philippines in the mid-1980s.

=== Service history ===
Diego Silang was commissioned into the Philippine Navy in 1980 and served until her decommissioning in June 1985. She was recommissioned in 1987 as BRP Diego Silang (PF-14), and was decommissioned for the second and final time in April 1990.

=== Disposal ===
After the Philippine Navy found her to be beyond economical repair, Diego Silang was discarded in July 1990 and probably scrapped. Some of her usable parts were made available for her sister ship BRP Andrés Bonifacio (PF-7).
