= Operation Michigan (1945) =

Naval operation during second world war

Operation Michigan (1945) was a 1945 U.S. Navy operation conducted during World War II. Its purpose was intercept Japanese planes operating between Iwo Jima and Truk.

== Example of use ==
- USS Bering Strait
