= Battle of the Paracel Islands =

1974 naval battle during the Vietnam War

Coordinates: 16°30′N 111°38′E

- Part of the Vietnam War
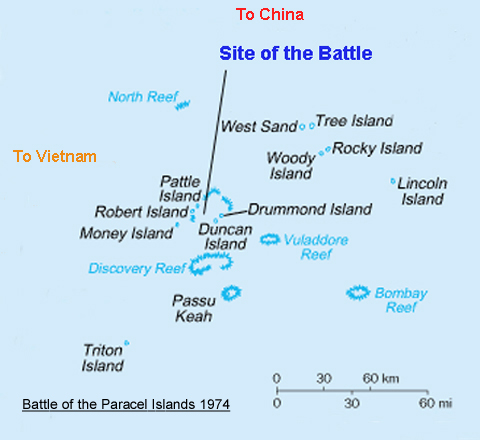
Date	19–20 January 1974 (1 day)
Location	Paracel Islands
Result	Chinese victory
Territorial changes	China establishes full control over the Paracels

Belligerents
China; People's Liberation Army Navy; Maritime Militia	South Vietnam; Republic of Vietnam Navy

Commanders and leaders
Zhang Yuanpei; Wei Mingsen	Lâm Ngươn Tánh; Hà Văn Ngạc; Hồ Văn Kỳ Thoại; Ngụy Văn Thà †; Huỳnh Duy Thạch †

Strength
2 minesweepers; 2 submarine chasers; Patrol ships; Infantry	1 destroyer; 2 frigates; 1 minesweeper; Commandos

Casualties and losses
18 killed; 67 wounded; 2 minesweepers damaged; 2 submarine chasers damaged	100+ killed and wounded; 48 captured; 1 minesweeper sunk; 1 destroyer heavily damaged; 2 frigates damaged

The Battle of the Paracel Islands (Chinese: 西沙海战; pinyin: Xisha haizhan; Vietnamese: Hải chiến Hoàng Sa) was an engagement between the Chinese and South Vietnamese navies near the Paracel Islands from 19 to 20 January 1974. The battle was part of an attempt by the South Vietnamese navy to remove the Chinese navy from the area towards the end of the Vietnam War.

Prior to the conflict, part of the Paracel Islands was controlled by China and another part was controlled by South Vietnam. The battle resulted in a victory for China over South Vietnam. Consequently, China occupied the portion formerly controlled by South Vietnam and established full de facto control over the Paracels. The battle made South Vietnam conduct a campaign to station troops on unoccupied islands in the Spratly Islands.

== Background ==
=== Confrontation in the Paracels ===
The Paracels are in the South China Sea approximately 300 kilometers south of China and 370 kilometers east Vietnam. The islands are divided into the northern Amphitrite Group, and the Crescent Group 80 kilometers to the southwest. The islands were subject to overlapping territorial claims by multiple countries. By the early 1970s, the Amphitrite Group and Crescent Group were controlled by China and South Vietnam respectively, and both countries were engaged in hydrocarbon exploration.

Tensions between China and South Vietnam in the South China Sea increased starting from the summer of 1973. South Vietnam claimed additional islands in the Spratlys to the south, and Chinese fishing ships established operations in the Crescent Group. Confrontations between the fishing ships and Republic of Vietnam Navy (RVNN) warships began in November 1973. On 14 January 1974, RVNN frigate HQ-16 fired warning shots at Chinese fishing ships near Robert Island and shelled the Chinese flag erected on the island. The frigate was joined by the destroyer HQ-4 on 17 January, which landed commandos to remove more flags on Robert and Money Islands. The frigate HQ-5 and minesweeper HQ-10 arrived in the evening.

=== China's response ===
China deployed forces after the RVNN presence was reported by fishing ships. The People's Liberation Army Navy's (PLAN) response was improvised. The fleet was in disrepair due to the Cultural Revolution. Command and control was poor throughout the operation.

On 16 January, two Kronshtadt-class submarine chasers, 271 and 274, were ordered to Woody Island in the Amphitrite Group from the Yulin Naval Base in Hainan. They resupplied and embarked Maritime Militia at Woody the next day before proceeding to the Crescent Group. A Shenyang J-6 escorted the ships south, but it was operating at extreme range and had only five minutes of loiter time over the Paracels. The ships were ordered not to cause trouble, not to fire first, and not to "get the worst of it." Four ten-member militia platoons deployed onto Duncan, Drummond, and Palm Islands early on 18 January.

More distant PLAN ships were ordered south as 271 and 274 reached the Crescent Group: the Guangzhou-based T010 minesweepers 389 and 396, and the Shantou-based Hainan class submarine chasers 281 and 282. 389 had just finished major repairs and had not yet been cleared for service. The South Sea Fleet's two Type 065 frigates were out-of-service due to mechanical problems.

The RVNN had larger ships, and larger guns with longer range. To this the PLAN's ships had maneuverability and speed.

The weather remained good throughout the operation. Poor weather, and its impact on seakeeping, would have had a greater effect on the smaller PLAN ships.

== Battle ==
=== Naval engagement ===
On the morning of 19 January, the RVNN divided into two groups — HQ-4 with HQ-5 and HQ-10 with HQ-16 — which approached the PLAN from different directions. The first group was monitored by 271 and 274, and the latter was shadowed by 389 and 396. HQ-16 forced its way through, ramming and damaging 389, and launched boats with commandos toward Duncan and Palm Islands. The Chinese militia killed one commando and wounded three others; the commandos retreated back to their ship.

Unable to dislodge the Chinese, the RVNN opened fire on the PLAN, and aimed for bridges. 274's political commissar, Feng Songbai, was killed. 389 was set on fire and began flooding. The faster PLAN closed the range to tens of meters, sheltering in the blind spots of the RVNN's deck guns and negating the RVNN's firepower advantage. At such ranges the PLAN's smaller guns were effective. The Chinese aimed at command posts, and communications and sensor equipment. 271 and 274 attacked HQ-4, which began filling with smoke. 389 and 396 forced HQ-16 to retreat, then attacked HQ-10; HQ-10's magazine exploded and her captain was killed by small-arms fire. HQ-4, HQ-5, and HQ-16 retreated to the west and did not reengage. 389's fire could not be extinguished and she was beached on Duncan Island.

281 and 282 were delayed by slow communications and arrived after noon. They sank HQ-10 south of Antelope Reef.

=== China occupies the Crescent Group ===
China moved quickly to exploit the naval victory. The South Sea Fleet deployed three amphibious assault flotillas to capture the Crescent Group islands. The first flotilla had four patrol craft and two fishing boats carrying an infantry company. The second flotilla had four patrol craft and 396 carrying an infantry company and an amphibious reconnaissance team. The third flotilla was a frigate which acted as the command ship and carried an infantry company. In all, there were 500 troops including militia.

On the morning of 20 January, troops from the first flotilla captured Robert Island in about ten minutes. Shortly after, the second flotilla attacked Pattle Island; 30 South Vietnamese troops, including an RVN army major, and a United States (US) liaison officer were captured. Money Island was abandoned by RVN commandos and captured without fighting.

== Aftermath ==
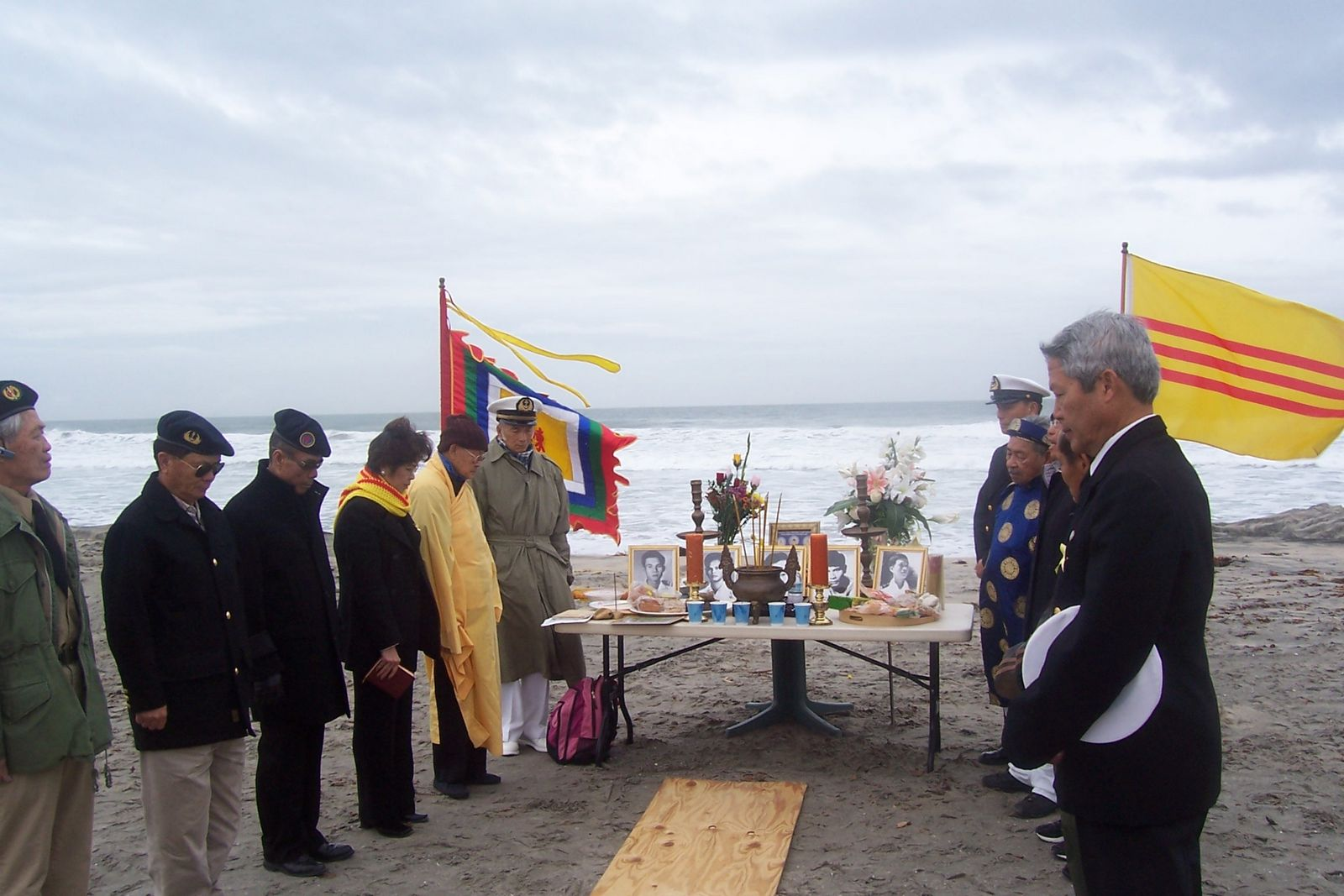
Memorial for the battle in 2004

=== Chinese consolidation ===
China continued to reinforce the Paracels in anticipation of a counterattack by South Vietnam. These included three East Sea Fleet Type 01 frigates, armed with SY-1 anti-ship missiles. Mao Zedong ordered the ships to sail through the Taiwan Strait, the fastest route but which exposed them to attack from Taiwan; the ships transited without incident. The South Sea Fleet's three Type 033 submarines conducted patrols; at the height of the crisis one was authorized to attack RVNN ships moving toward the islands. By July 1974, tensions had eased and China began its effort to expand its permanent presence in the Paracels.

=== South Vietnamese threats ===
South Vietnam tried to raise a complaint against China in the United Nations Security Council, but gave up on 25 January due to the Chinese veto.

President Nguyễn Văn Thiệu traveled to Da Nang to supervise the response. The armed forces went on heightened alert. The RVNN deployed ships to Da Nang and the Paracels. No counterattack occurred due to insufficient military resources in the context of South Vietnam still having to fight communists on the mainland. China had secured local superiority, especially with the arrival of the PLAN's Type 01 frigates. This battle strained the alliance between the United States and South Vietnam after the United States, which had no military alliance treaty with South Vietnam and had good relations with China, refused to support South Vietnam on the grounds that this was a disputed area.

=== South Vietnamese casualties ===
The South Vietnamese reported that the warship Nhật Tảo was sunk and Lý Thường Kiệt heavily damaged, while Trần Khánh Dư and Trần Bình Trọng were both slightly damaged. 75 South Vietnamese soldiers, including Captain Ngụy Văn Thà of Nhật Tảo, were killed, and 16 were wounded. On January 20, 1974, Dutch tanker Kopionella found and rescued 23 survivors of the sunken Nhật Tảo. On January 29, 1974, South Vietnamese fishermen found 15 South Vietnamese soldiers near Mũi Yến (Qui Nhơn) who had fought on Quang Hòa island and escaped in lifeboats.

After their successful amphibious assault on January 20, the Chinese held 48 prisoners, including an American advisor. They were later released in Hong Kong through the Red Cross.

=== Chinese casualties ===
Warships 271 and 396 suffered speed-reducing damage to their engines, but both returned to port safely and were repaired. 274 was damaged more extensively and had to stop at Yongxing Island for emergency repairs. It returned to Hainan under its own power the next day.

389 was damaged the most by an engine room explosion. Its captain managed to run his ship aground and put out the fire with the help of the minesweepers. It was then towed back to base. 18 Chinese sailors were killed and 67 were wounded in the battle.

=== Aftermath ===
On January 30, 1974, South Vietnam launched Operation Trần Hưng Đạo-48 to station troops on unoccupied islands to assert Vietnam's sovereignty over the Spratly archipelago after the Battle of the Paracel Islands.

A potential diplomatic crisis was averted when China released the American prisoner taken during the battle. Gerald Emil Kosh, 27, a former U.S. Army captain, was captured with the South Vietnamese on Pattle Island. He was described as a “regional liaison officer” for the American embassy in Saigon on assignment with the South Vietnamese Navy. China released him from custody on January 31 without comment.

Officially, North Vietnam did not oppose China. The communist leaders of North Vietnam gave a glimpse of their worsening relationship with China by conspicuously not congratulating their ally. An official communique issued by the North Vietnamese-controlled Provisional Revolutionary Government of the Republic of South Vietnam (PRG) mentioned only its desire for a peaceful and negotiated resolution for any local territorial dispute. In the wake of the battle, North Vietnamese Deputy Foreign Minister Nguyễn Cơ Thạch told the Hungarian ambassador to Hanoi that "there are many documents and data on Vietnam's archipelago." Other North Vietnamese cadres told the Hungarian diplomats that in their view, the conflict between China and the Saigon regime was but a temporary one. However, they later said the issue would be a problem of the entire Vietnamese nation.

After the reunification of Vietnam in July 1976, the Socialist Republic of Vietnam publicly renewed its claim to the Paracels by succeeding all claims from the PRG, which itself had directly replaced and inherited all rights of South Vietnam after the fall of Saigon in April 1975. Hanoi has carefully praised the South Vietnamese forces that took part in the battle while trying to avoid praising the former regime.

== See also ==
- Naval history of China
- Johnson South Reef Skirmish
