= Republic of Vietnam Navy =

Former naval branch of the South Vietnamese military

Republic of Vietnam Navy Hải quân Việt Nam Cộng hòa
- Emblem of the South Vietnamese Navy
- Founded: 1952
- Disbanded: 30 April 1975
- Country: South Vietnam
- Branch: Navy
- Role: Sea control
- Size: 42,000 men, 1,400 ships, boats and other vessels (1973)
- Part of: Vietnamese National Army (1952-1955); Republic of Vietnam Military Forces
- Garrison/HQ: Saigon, South Vietnam
- Nickname: "HQVNCH" ("RVNN" in English)
- Motto: Tổ quốc — Đại dương ("The Fatherland — The Ocean")
- March: Hải quân Việt Nam hành khúc (March of the Vietnam Navy)
- Anniversaries: 20 August
- Engagements: Vietnam War; Cambodian Civil War; Battle of the Paracel Islands

Commanders
- Notable commanders: Trần Văn Chơn; Lâm Nguơn Tánh; Chung Tấn Cang

Insignia
- Flag

- Naval ensign

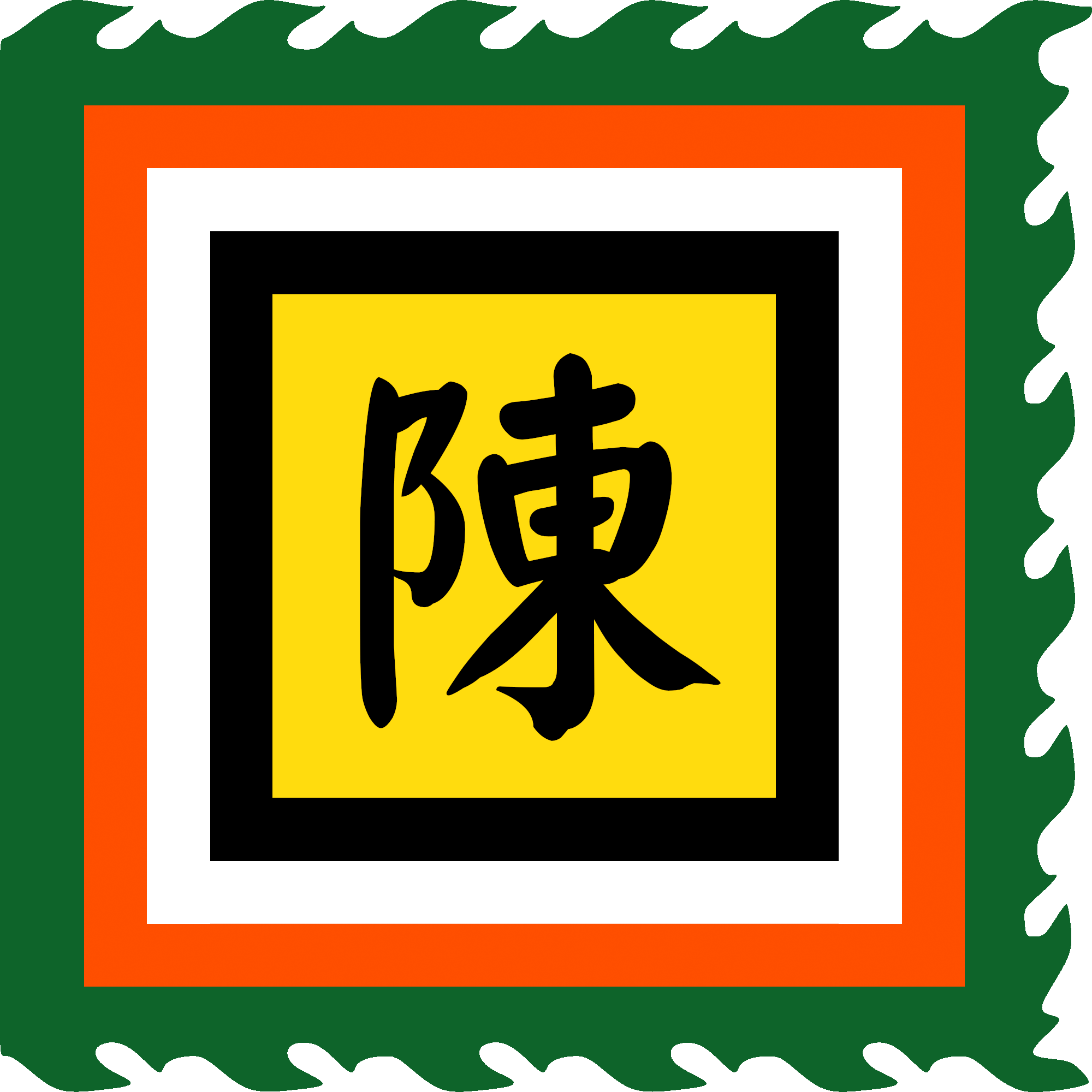
- Flag of Saint Trần

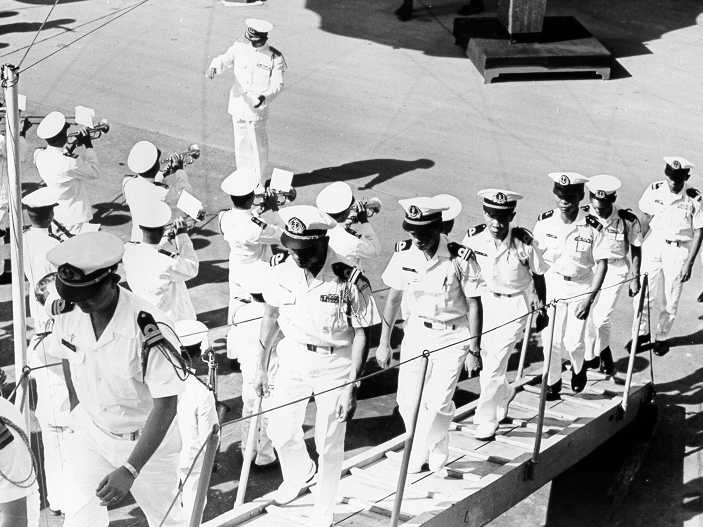
South Vietnamese navy officers and CPOs board their new ship, the United States Coast Guard Cutter Bering Strait (WHEC-382), which was transferred to the Republic of Vietnam Navy as frigate RVNS Trần Quang Khải.

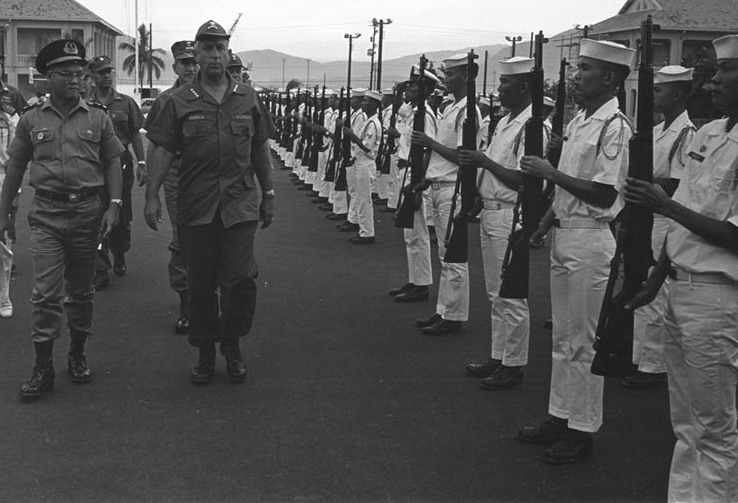
Commodore Trần Văn Chơn, Chief of Naval Operations, (left) and Admiral Thomas H. Moorer, U.S. Navy Chief of Naval Operations, (left center) inspect some of the South Vietnamese sailors who will take over river patrol operations from the U.S. Navy, c. September 1969. Note the M1 Garand rifles held by the sailors.

The Republic of Vietnam Navy (RVNN; Vietnamese: Hải quân Việt Nam Cộng hòa - HQVNCH; French: Marine de la république du Vietnam) was the naval branch of the South Vietnamese military, the official armed forces of the former Republic of Vietnam (or South Vietnam) from 1955 to 1975. The early fleet consisted of boats from France; after 1955, and the transfer of the armed forces to Vietnamese control, the fleet was supplied from the United States. With American assistance, in 1972 the RVNN became the largest Southeast Asian navy and, by some estimates, the fourth largest navy in the world, just behind the Soviet Union, the United States and the People's Republic of China, with 42,000 personnel, 672 amphibious ships and craft, 20 mine warfare vessels, 450 patrol craft, 56 service craft, and 242 junks. Other sources state that RVNN was the ninth largest navy in the world. The Republic of Vietnam Navy was responsible for the protection of the country's national waters, islands, and interests of its maritime economy, as well as for the co-ordination of maritime police, customs service and the maritime border defence force.

The RVNN disbanded in 1975 with the collapse of South Vietnam, and North Vietnam's victory in the Vietnam War. Most of its fleet was captured in port, but a small fleet of vessels, led by Captain Đỗ Kiếm and Richard L. Armitage of the Defense Attaché Office, Saigon, escaped to Thailand and surrendered themselves to American naval forces there. Some of these RVNN vessels were scuttled upon reaching the open sea, while others continued their service with the Philippine Navy.

== History ==
=== Expansion ===
Growth of the VNN
Year	Personnel	Vessels
1955	2,000	22
1961	5,000	220
1964	8,100	?
1967	16,300	639
1973	42,000	1,400

=== Politics and coups ===
RVNN commander Captain Hồ Tấn Quyền, was a loyal supporter of President Ngô Đình Diệm. In order to prevent him supporting Diệm in the 1963 South Vietnamese coup, he was executed by fellow RVNN officers on the morning of 1 November 1963.

During the 1965 South Vietnamese coup, rebel forces surrounded the RVNN headquarters at the Saigon Naval Shipyard, apparently in an attempt to capture RVNN commander Chung Tấn Cang. However, this was unsuccessful and Cang moved the fleet to Nhà Bè Base to prevent the rebels from seizing the ships.

=== Vietnamization ===
In early 1969, President Richard M. Nixon formally adopted the policy of "Vietnamization". The naval part, called ACTOV ("Accelerated Turnover to the Vietnamese"), involved the phased transfer to Vietnam of the U.S. river and coastal fleet, as well as operational command over various operations. In mid-1969, the RVNN took sole responsibility for river assault operations when the U.S. Mobile Riverine Force stood down and transferred 64 riverine assault craft to the RVNN. On 10 October 1969, 80 Patrol Boat, Rivers (PBR) were transferred to the RVNN at the Saigon Naval Shipyard, the PBRs were divided into four River Patrol Groups (RPGs) as part of Task Force 212.

=== Downfall ===
On 19 January 1974, four RVNN ships fought a battle with four ships of the Chinese People's Liberation Army Navy over ownership of the Paracel Islands, 200 nautical miles (370 km) due east of Đà Nẵng. The RVNN ship Nhựt Tảo (HQ-10) was sunk, Lý Thường Kiệt (HQ-16) was heavily damaged, and both Trần Khánh Dư (HQ-4) and Trần Bình Trọng (HQ-5) suffered light damage. The Chinese captured and occupied the islands. On 30 January 1974, the RVNN mounted Operation Trần Hưng Đạo-48 to station troops on unoccupied islands to assert Vietnam's sovereignty over the Spratly archipelago.

In the spring of 1975, North Vietnamese forces occupied all of northern and central South Vietnam, and finally Saigon fell on 30 April 1975. American military attaché Richard Armitage and RVNN Captain Kiem Do had secretly planned and then carried out the evacuation of a flotilla of 35 RVNN and other vessels, with 30,000 sailors, their families, and other civilians aboard to Côn Sơn Island, where they met USS Kirk, who escorted the flotilla to U.S. Naval Base Subic Bay, 1,000 miles (1,609.3 km) away.

Due to the poor condition and overcrowding of many of the vessels in the flotilla, the five-mile long convoy was forced to travel at the speed of the slowest boat, 6 knots, or over 6 days. By the time the convoy approached Philippine waters, the Government of the Philippines had acknowledged the legitimacy of the North Vietnamese government, so the ships were technically PRG property. Armitage decided to repatriate the vessels, with U.S. junior officers, NCOs, and Armitage himself taking command of the 32 vessels to sail them into Subic under the U.S. flag where they were later given to the Philippine Navy. LSM Lam Giang (HQ-402), fuel barge HQ-474, and gunboat HQ-604 transferred their cargo of refugees and their crews to other ships, and were scuttled off Côn Sơn after it was determined they would not survive the journey to Subic. RVNS Mỹ Tho (HQ-800) remains one of the last former RVNN vessels still in commission today as BRP Sierra Madre (LT-57).

After the war, about 1,300 former RVNN vessels including junks were absorbed into the Vietnam People's Navy, making it the largest Southeast Asian navy in the mid-1980s. Some personnel were retained, with 80% of the Hàm Tử Brigade in the VPN's Bạch Đằng Fleet being South Vietnamese veterans.

== Organization ==
=== Fleet Command ===
RVNN Fleet Command was directly responsible to the RVNN Chief of Naval Operations for the readiness of ships and craft. The Fleet Commander assigned and scheduled ships to operate in the Coastal Zones, Riverine Areas, and the Rung Sat Special Zone. All Fleet Command ships were home ported in Saigon and normally returned there after deployments. When deployed, operational control was assumed by the respective zone or area commander, and the ships operated from the following ports:

- I Coastal Zone – Đà Nẵng
- II Coastal Zone – Nha Trang/Qui Nhơn
- III Coastal Zone – Vũng Tàu/Cần Thơ/Châu Đức
- IV Coastal Zone – An Thoi/Phú Quốc
- Rung Sat Special Zone – Nhà Bè

=== Flotillas ===
The RVNN was organized into two flotillas: a patrol flotilla and a logistics flotilla. Flotilla I was composed of patrol ships, organized into four squadrons. The patrol types included LSSLs and LSILs which normally operated only in riverine areas or the Rung Sat Special Zone; though occasionally they were assigned the four coastal zones. Operational commitments required that half of the patrol flotilla be deployed at all times, with a boat typically spending 40 to 50 days at sea on each patrol. Fleet Command patrol ships assigned to the riverine areas provided naval gunfire support as well as patrolling the main waterways in the riverine areas. One river patrol unit was assigned as convoy escort on the Mekong River to and from the Cambodian border.

Flotilla II was composed of logistic ships, divided into two squadrons, supporting the naval units and bases throughout South Vietnam. Logistic ships were under the administrative control of the Fleet Commander, and under the operational control of the RVNN Deputy Chief of Staff for Logistics who acted upon orders from the Central Logistics Command of the Joint General Staff.

=== Naval Infantry/Marines ===
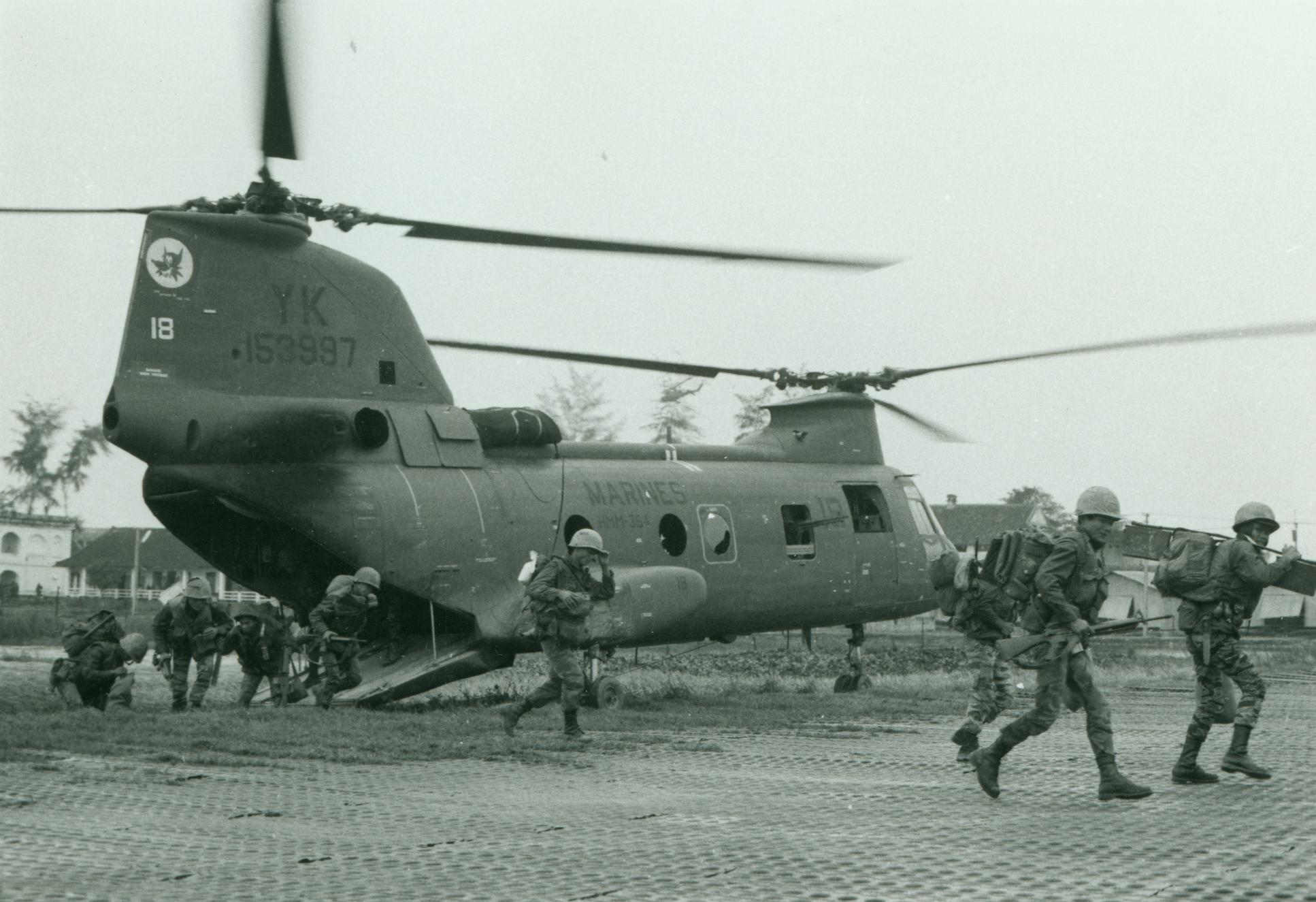
A U.S. CH-46 from MAG-36 drops off South Vietnamese marines into Hue on 23 February 1968

The RVNN also had under them a contingent of Naval Infantry or Marine Division formed in 1954 by then Prime Minister Ngo Dinh Diem and trained by the French Commandos Marine.

=== Underwater Demolition Team ===
The South Vietnamese Navy had a small frogman group, the Liên Đoàn Người Nhái.

=== Training ===
The RVNN training establishment consisted of a Training Bureau located at VNN Headquarters, with Training Centers located in Saigon, Nha Trang, and Cam Ranh Bay.

== Ranks and insignia ==
=== Commissioned officer ranks ===
The rank insignia of commissioned officers.

Rank group	General / flag officers					Senior officers			Junior officers
Republic of Vietnam Navy (1955-1963)
Republic of Vietnam Navy (1955-1963)		Đô đốc	Phó đô đốc	Đề đốc	Phó đề đốc	Đại tá	Trung tá	Thiếu tá	Đại úy	Trung úy	Thiếu úy
Republic of Vietnam Navy (1964-1975)
Republic of Vietnam Navy (1964-1975)	Thủy sư Đô đốc	Đô đốc	Phó đô đốc	Đề đốc	Phó đề đốc	Đại tá	Trung tá	Thiếu tá	Đại úy	Trung úy	Thiếu úy

=== Other ranks ===
The rank insignia of non-commissioned officers and enlisted personnel.

Rank group	Senior NCOs				Junior NCOs		Enlisted
Republic of Vietnam Navy (1954–1967)								No insignia
Republic of Vietnam Navy (1954–1967)	Thượng sĩ nhất	Thượng sĩ	Trung sĩ nhất	Trung sĩ	Hạ sĩ nhất	Hạ sĩ	Binh nhất	Binh nhì
Republic of Vietnam Navy (1967–1975)								No insignia
Republic of Vietnam Navy (1967–1975)	Thượng sĩ nhất	Thượng sĩ	Trung sĩ nhất	Trung sĩ	Hạ sĩ nhất	Hạ sĩ	Binh nhất	Binh nhì

== Commanders ==
- Commander (later Navy Captain) Lê Quang Mỹ, 1955–57
- Commander Trần Văn Chơn, 1957–59
- Navy Captain Hồ Tấn Quyền, 1959–63
- Navy Captain (later Vice Admiral) Chung Tấn Cang, 1963–65
- Navy Captain Trần Văn Phấn, 1965–66
- Lieutenant General Cao Văn Viên, September – November 1966 - Temporary after Coup d'État
- Navy Captain (later Rear Admiral) Trần Văn Chơn, 1966–74
- Rear Admiral Lâm Ngươn Tánh, for 2 months between 1974 and 1975
- Vice Admiral Chung Tấn Cang, 24 March – 29 April 1975
- Rear Admiral Hoàng Cơ Minh, 1974 – 30 April 1975

== See also ==
- Ships of the Republic of Vietnam Navy
- Army of the Republic of Vietnam
- Republic of Vietnam Military Forces
- Republic of Vietnam Air Force
- Republic of Vietnam Marine Division
- Royal Lao Navy
- Khmer National Navy

== Bibliography ==
- Bogart, Charles H. (2003). "The Navy of the Republic of Vietnam". Warship International. XL (2): 175–188. ISSN 0043-0374.
- This article incorporates material translated from the corresponding page in the Vietnamese Wikipedia.
