= List of telecommunications companies in the Middle East and Africa =

A telecommunications company (historically known as a telephone company) is a company which provides broadband and/or telephony services.

The telecommunications companies of the Middle East and Africa are listed below:

== Algeria ==
=== Fixed-line operators ===
- Algérie Telecom

=== Mobile operators ===
- Djezzy (Orascom Telecom Algerie) (OTA) subsidiary of Orascom Telecom Holding (OTH)
- Mobilis (Algérie Telecom)
- Nedjma (Wataniya Télécom Algérie), a subsidiary of Qatar Telecom (Qtel)

=== Mobile satellite operators ===
- ATS, a subsidiary of Algérie Telecom

== Angola ==
=== Fixed-line operators ===
- Angola Telecom
- MSTelcom (Sonangol Group)

=== Mobile operators ===
- Movicel
- MovelSIM
- Unitel

== Bahrain ==
=== Fixed-line operators ===
- Batelco
- LightSpeed Communications

=== Mobile operators ===
- Batelco
- Zain Bahrain (Zain Group)

== Benin ==
=== Fixed-line operators ===
- Benin Telecoms

=== Mobile operators ===
- BBCOM (Bell Bénin Communication)
- GLOBACOM
- LIBERCOM
- MOOV Bénin
- MTN (MTN Group)

== Botswana ==
=== Fixed-line operators ===
- Botswana Telecommunications Corporation

=== Mobile operators ===
- Botswana Telecommunications Corporation
- MASCOM
- Orange

== Burkina Faso ==
=== Fixed-line operators ===
- Onatel (Morocco Telecom)

=== Mobile operators ===
- Airtel Burkina Faso (Airtel Group)

== Burundi ==
=== Fixed-line operators ===
- LEO Burundi
- ONATEL Burundi

=== Mobile operators ===
- Econet Wireless
- Hits Telecom
- Onamob
- Africell Safari
- U-Com

== Cameroon ==
=== Fixed-line operators ===
- Cameroon Telecom

=== Mobile operators ===
- Cameroon Telecom
- CISNET TELECOM (CISNET Group)
- MTN (MTN Group)
- Orange (Orange S.A.)
- WiMax (WiMax Group)

== Chad ==
=== Fixed-line operators ===
- SotelTchad

=== Mobile operators ===
- Airtel Chad (Bharti Airtel)
- Tigo Chad (Millicom)

== Comoros ==
=== Fixed-line operators ===
- Comores Telecom

== Congo ==
=== Mobile operators ===
- Congo Telecom

=== Mobile operators ===
- Airtel Congo (Airtel Group)
- Warid Congo (Warid Telecom)

== Côte d'Ivoire ==
=== Fixed-line operators ===
- Orange (Orange S.A.)

=== Mobile operators ===
- Green
- Koz
- Moov
- MTN Côte d'Ivoire (MTN Group)
- Orange (Orange S.A.)
- Warid

== Democratic Republic of the Congo ==
=== Fixed-line operators ===
- OCPT

=== Mobile operators ===
- Airtel DRC (Airtel Group
- Orange RDC (Orange S.A.)
- Tigo Democratic Republic of Congo (Millicom)
- Vodacom (Vodafone Group)

== Egypt ==
=== Fixed-line operators ===
- Telecom Egypt

=== Mobile operators ===
- Etisalat Egypt (Etisalat)
- Orange Egypt (Orange S.A.)
- Vodafone Egypt (Vodafone and Telecom Egypt)
- We (Telecom Egypt)

== Equatorial Guinea ==
=== Fixed-line operators ===
- GETESA (Orange S.A.)

=== Mobile operators ===
- GETESA (Orange S.A.)
- Muni (Antes Hits Telecom)
- Gecomsa

== Eritrea ==
=== Fixed-line operators ===
- Telesonra

=== Mobile operators ===
- EriTel

== Ethiopia ==
=== Fixed-line operators ===
- Ethio Telecom
- safaricom Ethiopia

=== Mobile operators ===
- Ethio Telecom
- Safaricom Ethiopia

== Gabon ==
=== Fixed-line operators ===
- Gabon Telecom (Maroc Telecom)

=== Mobile operators ===
- Airtel (Bharti Airtel)
- Gabon Telecom (Maroc Telecom)
- Moov (Etisalat)

== Gambia ==
=== Fixed-line operators ===
- Gamtel

=== Mobile operators ===
- Africell (Lintel Holding)
- Gamcel (Gamtel)
- Q-cell (Qcell)

== Ghana ==
=== Fixed-line operators ===
- Vodafone Ghana

=== Mobile operators ===
- AirtelTigo Ghana (Airtel Group)
- Globacom
- MTN Ghana (MTN Group)
- Telecel Ghana

== Guinea ==
=== Fixed-line operators ===
- Sotelgui

=== Mobile operators ===
- Areeba
- Cellcom
- Intercel
- Lagui
- Orange Guinea

== Iran ==
=== Fixed-line operators ===
- TCI
- Zoha Kish Telecom Iran
- HiWEB

=== Mobile operators ===
- Airtel Pras
- Hamrah Aval
- Kish Free Zone
- MTCE
- MTN Irancell (MTN Group)
- Rightel
- Taliya

== Iraq ==
=== Fixed-line operators ===
- ITPC

=== Mobile operators ===
- AsiaCell (Qtel)
- Korek Telecom
- Moutiny
- SanaTel
- Zain Iraq (Zain Group)

== Israel ==
=== Fixed-line operators ===
- 012 Smile
- 013 Netvision
- 018 X-Fone
- Bezeq
- Cellcom
- Hot
- Partner Communications Company
- Voicenter

=== Mobile operators ===
- Cellcom
- Golan Telecom
- Home Cellular (MVNO using Cellcom)
- Hot Mobile former Mirs Communications Ltd.
- Partner Communications Company (Partner)
- Pelephone (Bezeq)
- Rami Levi (MVNO) using Pelephone)
- YouPhone (MVNO) using Orange)

== Jordan ==
=== Fixed-line operators ===
- Jordan Telecom (Jordan Telecom Group)
- Kulacom

=== Mobile operators ===
- Orange Jordan (Jordan Telecom Group & Orange S.A.)
- Umniah (Batelco)
- XPress Telecom (NASCO & Qtel)
- Zain Jordan (Zain)

== Kenya ==
=== Fixed-line operators ===
- Telkom Kenya
- Wananchi

=== Mobile operators ===
- Airtel Kenya (Airtel Group)
- Telkom Kenya
- Safaricom (Telkom Kenya and Vodafone)
- Orange (Orange S.A.)
- Equitel
- Jamii Telecom

== Kuwait ==
=== Fixed-line operators ===
- Ministry of Communications – Kuwait (MOCK)

=== Mobile operators ===
- VIVA - Kuwait Telecom Company (STC)
- Ooreedoo Kuwait (Ooreedoo Group)
- Zain Kuwait (Zain Group)

== Lebanon ==
=== Fixed-line operators ===
- OGERO (MPT)

=== Mobile operators ===
- Alfa (management contract to Orascom Telecom)
- Mtc touch (management contract to Zain)

== Lesotho ==
=== Fixed-line operators ===
- Telecom Lesotho

=== Mobile operators ===
- Econet Wireless
- Vodacom (Telkom and Vodafone)

== Libya ==
=== Fixed-line operators ===
- General Posts and Telecommunications Company
- Libya Telecom & Technology

=== Mobile operators ===
- Almadar
- Libyana

== Madagascar ==
=== Fixed-line operators ===
- Telma

=== Mobile operators ===
- Airtel
- orange
- Telma

== Malawi ==
=== Mobile operators ===
- Airtel Malawi (Airtel Group)
- Malawi Telecommunications Limited (MTL)
- Telekom Networks Malawi (TNM)

== Mali ==
=== Fixed-line operators ===
- Sotelma

=== Mobile operators ===
- Malitel (Sotelma)
- Orange Mali (Orange S.A.)

== Mauritius ==
=== Fixed-line operators ===
- Mauritius Telecom

=== Mobile operators ===
- Airtel
- MyT
- Emtel
- Chilli (MTML)

== Morocco ==
=== Fixed-line operators ===
- INWI
- Maroc Telecom (Government of Morocco and Etisalat)
- Méditel (Finance com and Orange SA)

=== Mobile operators ===
- INWI
- Maroc Telecom
- Méditel (Finance com and Telefónica)
- Orange (Orange S.A.)

== Mozambique ==
=== Fixed-line operators ===
- Telecommunicacoes De Mozambique (TDM)

=== Mobile network operators ===
- MCel (Government of Mozambique)
- Vodacom (Telkom and Vodafone)
- Movitel

== Namibia ==
=== Fixed-line operators ===
- Telecom Namibia

=== Mobile operators ===
- MTC Namibia

== Niger ==
=== Mobile operators ===
- Airtel Niger

== Nigeria ==
=== Fixed-line operators ===
- NITEL (Transcorp)
- Starcoms

=== Mobile operators ===
- Mtel (Transcorp)
- Airtel Nigeria (Airtel Group)
- Globacom
- MTN Nigeria (MTN Group)
- Etisalat Nigeria (Etisalat) – now re-branded 9mobile after Etisalat's withdrawal from the market
- Multilinks Telkom
- Starcomms
- Zoom Mobile
- Visafone

== Oman ==
=== Fixed-line operators ===
- Omantel
- Ooredoo Oman (was Nawras)

=== Mobile operators ===
- Oman Mobile (Omantel)
- Ooredoo Oman (was Nawras) (Ooredoo Group & TDC)

== Palestine ==
=== Fixed-line operators ===
- Paltel

=== Mobile operators ===
- Jawwal
- Ooredoo Palestine (Qtel)

== Qatar ==
=== Fixed-line operators ===
- Ooredoo
- Vodafone Qatar

=== Mobile operators ===
- Ooredoo
- Vodafone Qatar

== Le Réunion ==
=== Fixed-line operators ===
- Reunion Telecom
- Novatell

=== Mobile operators ===
- SFR Réunion
- Orange Réunion
- Only Réunion

== Rwanda ==
=== Fixed-line operators ===
- Rwandatel

=== Mobile operators ===
- MTN Rwandacell (MTN Group)
- Rwanda Airtel
- Tigo Rwanda
- Rwandatel

== Saudi Arabia ==
=== Fixed-line operators ===
- Saudi Telecom Company
- Mobily (Etisalat)
- GO (Etihad Atheeb Telecom)

=== Mobile operators ===
- Saudi Telecom Company
- Mobily (Etisalat)
- Zain Saudi Arabia (Zain)
- Virgin Mobile (Virgin Group) (MVNO with STC)
- Lebara Mobile (Etihad Jawraa) (MVNO with Mobily)

== Senegal ==
=== Fixed-line operators ===
- Sonatel

=== Mobile operators ===
- Expresso – Senegal (CDMA)
- Orange (GSM)
- Tigo (GSM)

== Sierra Leone ==
=== Fixed-line operators ===
- Sierratel

=== Mobile operators ===
- Airtel Sierra Leone (Airtel Group)
- Africell (Lintel Holding)
- Comium

== Somalia ==
=== Fixed-line operators ===
- Hormuud Telecom
- AmteL

=== Mobile Operators ===
- Somtel
- Heersare telecom
- AmteL

== South Africa ==
Main article: List of broadband providers in South Africa

=== Fixed-line operators ===
- Telkom
- Neotel

=== Mobile ===
- MTN Group
- Vodacom
- Telkom Mobile
- Cell C
- Rain
- Mr. Price Mobile
- Virgin Mobile South Africa
- Me&You Mobile

== Sudan ==
=== Fixed-line operators ===
- Thabit (Sudatel)
- Canar (Etisalat)

=== Mobile operators ===
- Sudani
- MTN Sudan (MTN Group)
- Zain Sudan (Zain Group)

== Swaziland ==
=== Fixed-line operators ===
- Swaziland Post and Telecommunication Corporation (SPTC)

=== Mobile operators ===
- Swazi Mobile
- Swazi MTN

== Syria ==
=== Fixed-line operators ===
- Syrian Telecommunications Establishment (STE)

=== Mobile operators ===
- MTN Syria (MTN Group)
- SyriaTel

== Tanzania ==
=== Fixed-line operators ===
- Tanzania Telecommunications Corporation

=== Mobile operators ===
- Tanzania Telecommunications Corporation
- Airtel Tanzania (Airtel Group)
- Tigo Tanzania (Millicom)
- Vodacom Tanzania (Vodacom)
- Sasatel Tanzania (Sasatel)
- Benson Informatics Tanzania (Benson)
- Zantel Tanzania (Etisalat)

== Togo ==
=== Fixed-line operators ===
- TOGOCOM

== Tunisia ==
=== Fixed-line operators ===
- Tunisie Telecom (TUNTEL)

=== Mobile operators ===
- Tunisiana (Ooredoo)
- Tunisie Telecom (TUNTEL)
- Orange

== Uganda ==
=== Fixed-line operators ===
- MTN Uganda (MTN Group)
- Uganda Telecom

=== Mobile operators ===
- Airtel Uganda
- K2 Telecom Acquired by Airtel Uganda
- MTN Uganda
- Uganda Telecom
- Vodafone Uganda
- Lyca Mobile

== United Arab Emirates ==
=== Fixed-line operators ===
- Du
- Etisalat

=== Mobile operators ===
- Du
- Etisalat
- Virgin Mobile
- Swyp, by e&

== Yemen ==
=== Mobile operators ===
- MTN Yemen (MTN Group)
- Sabafon
- Y (HiTS-UNITEL)
- Yemen Mobile

== Zambia ==
=== Fixed-line operators ===
- Zamtel

=== Mobile operators ===
- Airtel (Bharti group)
- MTN (MTN group)
- Zamtel (LAPGreen Group)

== Zimbabwe ==
=== Fixed-line operators ===
- TelOne

=== Mobile operators ===
- Airtel
- Econet Wireless
- Net*One
- Telecel (Orascom)

== See also ==
- Telephone company
- List of telecommunications companies
  - List of telecommunications companies in the Americas
  - List of telecommunications companies in Asia and Oceania
  - List of telecommunications companies in Europe
- List of mobile network operators
  - List of mobile network operators of the Americas
  - List of mobile network operators in Asia and Oceania
  - List of mobile network operators in Europe
  - List of mobile network operators in the Middle East and Africa
