= Internet in Bahrain =

Bahrain has been connected to the internet since 1995, and made it readily available to its citizens. The country's domain suffix is '.bh'. A 2004 study showed a liberal filtering system being used in Bahrain, one which could be easily bypassed, however more recent events have shown more sophisticated and pervasive filtering. In January 2009, Bahrain started blocking a vastly increased number of sites through the Information Affairs Authority (IAA). The new filtering has had a noticeable impact on internet access speeds for all traffic.

In 2010, there were about 694,000 internet users in Bahrain, or 55% of the population. According to the World Bank, over 90% of the population is connected to the internet between 2010 and 2014. This later rose to 96.4% (an estimated 1.29 million online) in 2015, making Bahrain the country with the highest internet penetration percentage in the Middle East.

== Internet penetration and usage ==
The growth in fixed telephone lines and the Internet has made Bahrain a regional information and communications technology leader. The country's connectivity score (a statistic which measures both Internet access and fixed and mobile telephone lines) is 210.4 percent per person, while the regional average in Arab States of the Persian Gulf is 135.37 percent. The number of Bahraini Internet users has risen from 40,000 in 2000 to 250,000 in 2008, or from 5.95 to 33 percent of the population. The telecom market witnessed a remarkable development in November 2008 when Mena Telecom launched its nationwide WiMAX network, a service that provides high speed wireless voice and data services.

To encourage creativity in domestic online content, in 2005 Bahrain launched an e-content award organised by the eGovernment Authority in Bahrain and the Bahrain Internet Society. The goal of the award is to select quality online content and to promote creativity and innovation in the development of new media applications in Bahrain.

Bahrain's online community is small but dynamic. As of January 2008, there were over 535 websites based in Bahrain, focusing on 25 different themes (e.g., public forums); 59 websites for governmental organizations; and about 200 blogs, the majority of which are anonymous blogs. Internet users in Bahrain use the Internet to debate sensitive issues and to exchange content that is not available in the traditional media. The authorities have blocked a number of news, religion, human rights, and humour websites run by Bahrainis and by non-Bahrainis, but users manage to access them using proxies.

Bahrain's telecom market is regulated by the Telecommunications Regulatory Authority (TRA), which was established by Legislative Decree No. 48 of 2002 to protect the interests of subscribers and users and to promote effective and fair competition among established and new licensed operators. As of 2008, the TRA has licensed 22 Internet Service Providers, the largest of which is Batelco.

== Internet Service Providers in Bahrain (ISP) ==
- Ascentech Telecom: Value added Telecommunications company established in 2005. Services include International calling cards, online SMS, cloud services, as well as business voice and data services.
- Bahrain Internet Exchange (BIX): Body established by government decree to connect Internet Service Providers, in order to increase local traffic and content, as well as reduce the cost of purchasing international bandwidth.
- Batelco: Regional telecommunications company specialising in mobile, national and international telephony, business network services, Internet and satellite services etc.
- Etisalcom: offers ETISL IP telephony, More international calling cards, national & international connectivity, Internet, hosting etc.
- Inet Email: E-mail service provided by Bahrain Telecommunications Company
- Kalaam Telecom
- Lightspeed Communications: Lightspeed Communications is Bahrain's first alternative fixed-line telecommunications operator. Services offered includes voice & Internet; head office is in Almoayyed Tower in Seef; strategic partners include Jordan Telecom. Lightspeed was bought over by Kalaam Telecom.
- Mena Telecom: Telecommunications company based in Manama; services: carrier pre-select, two-way satellite, broadband applications, international prepaid calling cards etc. Mena Telecom is now being acquired by VIVA Bahrain
- North Star Communications: Providers of Internet, IP Telephony services; Pre-paid & Post-paid International Call services, Internet leased lines, ADSL services, GPS Vehicle Tracking, Website development etc.
- Nuetel Communications: offers services including voice, Internet & television over a single broadband connection; head office is in Amwaj Islands; strategic partners include Cisco Systems & British Telecom.
- Prism International Solutions: wholesaler and retailer of data and communication products like Switches, Routers, Wireless, IP Telephone, Media Converter, Copper and Fiber Products, Communication and Server Cabinets, Data Center Products, Tools and Testing Equipment
- Rapid Telecom: Provides Dedicated / Broadband Internet, Leased lines over Fiber Optics as well as Microwave, National and international telephony.
- Viacloud: Viacloud telecom started operations in 2004 in the Kingdom of Bahrain and was one of the first non-government telecom operators to obtain licenses from the regulator and started offering voice, data and other value-added telecom services to Businesses and Individuals in Bahrain and in the Middle East. Today, besides traditional telecom services like SIP & PRI telephone lines, business internet, home internet, fiber internet, Viacloud offers multiple next generation services in the region like Cloud PBX, Cloud Call Center, Cloud Fleet management, Cloud Servers, Firewalls, Cyber Security, Backup & DR Solutions, etc. with customers ranging from a variety of sectors across regional markets including Banks and financial institutions, Trading, Hotels & Hospitality, Food & Beverage, Manufacturing, Hospitals & Healthcare, Service industry, Shipping & Logistics, Government and more.
- Zain: Regional telecommunications company specialising in mobile, national and international telephony, business network services, Internet and satellite services.

== Surveillance and filtering ==
Users who try to access a blocked webpage see this message

The Ministry of Information has established a special unit which monitors websites for possible blocking. The government has indicated an interest in setting up a commission to monitor the press and Internet content to "report any incitement to confessionnalism." Government efforts to monitor websites have also been confirmed by media reports that cite an official source saying that in addition to websites being monitored on a daily basis, the use of circumvention techniques to update banned websites is also being watched. Telecommunication Regulatory Authority - Kingdom of Bahrain, “Legislative Decree no. 48 of 2002 Promulgating the Telecommunications Law,”

Results from first 2008-2009 test runs found limited blocking of pornographic and LGBT content and proxy and anonymizing services. However, after the January 2009 Ministerial decree, which ordered ISPs to implement an official filtering system, ONI found that the filtering of content in officially prohibited categories has become pervasive, which is an indication that the ISPs have started to use a commercial filtering system. Also, the ISPs have started to serve an explicit blockpage with a reference to the Ministerial decree.

Mid-February 2011, start of the Bahraini uprising, Internet traffic dropped by 20% due to aggressive government filtering.

=== Arrested bloggers ===
On April 9, 2011, blogger Zakariya Rashid Hassan al-Ashiri died in prison after being tortured. He had been arrested for “inciting hatred,” “disseminating false news,” “promoting sectarianism,” and “calling for the regime’s overthrow in online forums.”

A number of persons have been arrested for posting online messages:

- Abbas Al-Murshid
- Mohamed Al-Maskati
- Ali Omid
- Fadel Al-Marzouk
- Hossein Abdalsjad Abdul Hossein Al-Abbas
- Jaffar Abdalsjad Abdul Hossein Al-Abbas
- Hamza Ahmed Youssef Al-Dairi
- Ahmed Youssef Al-Dairi
- Fadhel Abdulla Ali Al-Marzooq
- Hani Muslim Mohamed Al-Taif
- Ali Hassan Salman Al-Satrawi
- Abduljalil Al-Singace
- Ali Abdulemam

== Social Media in Bahrain ==
Social media has played a role in fueling the unrest in Bahrain with "highly inflammatory" information, according to a report by the Bahrain Independent Commission of Inquiry (BICI).

The Commission stated that it was "aware" of the impact of the use of social media websites, such as Facebook and Twitter, has had on some major social and political events in the contemporary world.

"The commission found numerous examples of exaggeration and misinformation, some highly inflammatory, that were disseminated through social media," the report stated.

Another issue raised in the findings was that mainstream media in Bahrain ignored views of opposition groups.

"The lack of access to mainstream media creates frustration within opposition groups and results in these groups resorting to other media such as social media," stated the report.

This, it said, could have a "destabilizing effect" because social media outlets were both untraceable and unaccountable.

The commission recommended the Bahrain government to relax censorship and allow the opposition greater access to television and radio broadcasts as well as print media.

Errors

The BICI team also met officials from Information Affairs Authority (IAA), who provided a file concerning the involvement of the international media in the events of February and March.

The IAA alleged that there was incitement practiced by some foreign media against Bahrain.

It also stated that the international media made factual errors when reporting on events.

"Much of this material contained derogatory language and inflammatory coverage of events, and some may have been defamatory,"said the BICI.

"However, the commission did not find any evidence of media coverage that constituted hate speech or incitement to violence."

== See also ==
- Telecommunications in Bahrain
