= Telephone numbers in Yemen =

- Country: Yemen
- Continent: Asia
- Numbering plan type: Closed
- Country code: +967
- International access: 00
- Long-distance: 0 (landlines only)

Telephone numbers in Yemen are administered under the National Numbering Plan overseen by the Ministry of Telecommunications and Information Technology. The country code "+967" was assigned to Yemen by the International Telecommunication Union.

== Telephone numbering plan ==
The telephone numbering plan in Yemen is as follows:

Fixed network
Area code	Governorate(s)
01	Sanaa
02	Aden, Lahij, Abyan, Dhale
03	Hodeidah
04	Ibb, Taiz
05	Hadhramaut, Shabwa, Al Mahrah, Mukalla
06	Marib, Al Jawf, Al Bayda, Dhamar
07	Saada, Hajjah, 'Amran, Al Mahwit

Mobile network
Code	Carrier
70	Y
71	Sabafon
73	Yemeni Omani United (formerly MTN Yemen)
77 & 78	Yemen Mobile
10	Yemen 4G

Cellular network operating lines by companies (2008–2010)
Company	Operating lines	Year
Y	269,308	2008
Y	257,153	2009
Y	392,330	2010
Sabafon	2,383,870	2008
Sabafon	2,896,717	2009
Sabafon	3,774,173	2010
Yemeni Omani United	1,858,722	2008
Yemeni Omani United	2,342,758	2009
Yemeni Omani United	3,606,796	2010
Yemen Mobile	1,933,133	2008
Yemen Mobile	2,816,145	2009
Yemen Mobile	3,312,045	2010
Yemen 4G		2022
Yemen 4G	100,000	2026

== Pre-unification ==
Before the Yemeni unification, North Yemen and South Yemen had different numbering plans and different country codes, with South Yemen using +969, and North Yemen using +967, with the latter becoming the country code for present day unified Yemen.

== See also ==
- Telecommunications in Yemen
- Sabafon, GSM provider in Yemen.
- Yemeni Omani United (YOU - formerly MTN), GSM provider in Yemen, previously known as Spacetel and currently known as YOU.
