= Telephone numbers in Bahrain =

- Country: Bahrain
- Continent: Asia
- Regulator: Telecommunications Regulatory Authority of Bahrain
- Numbering plan type: Closed
- NSN length: 8 (usually)
- Country code: +973
- International access: 00
- Long-distance: n/a

The Bahrain Telecommunications Regulatory Authority (TRA) is a governmental institution which regularly updates and publishes reports on the country's national numbering plan. The reports include all the number blocks used in the Kingdom of Bahrain.

Telephone numbers in Bahrain are generally eight digits long with the exception of short codes which have fewer digits. Majority of the fixed landline numbers start with 1. Cellular (Mobile) phone numbers and pager numbers start with 3* or 663* or 669* depending on the service provider.

There is no area code in Bahrain, however the two digit numbers after the landline prefixes represent different cities or regions in Bahrain for example 44 is sakhir (1744 0000) so these are called exchange codes but other carriers never had exchange codes only the main one which is batelco

Batelco is the main service provider for landlines. Mobile users commonly subscribe to Batelco, Zain or STC.

Range	Type	Service provider
133	Landline	Etisalcom
1344	Landline	Rawabi
1350	Landline	Elephant Talk
136	Landline	Zain
1600–1603, 1606-1607	Landline	Neutel
1610, 1616, 1619	Landline	Kalam
6966, 6969, 6996, 6999, 80888	Landline	Rapid
16171	Landline	Viacloud
165	Landline	Infonas
166	Landline	Lightspeed
17	Landline	Batelco
31	Mobile	Royal Court
320-323, 380-384, 387-389, 39	Mobile	Batelco
3250, 33, 340-346, 350, 351, 353-355	Mobile	STC
36, 37	Mobile	Zain
6111	Universal	Kulacom
6160	Universal	Kalam
6500	Universal	Viacloud
6600, 6688	Universal	Rawabi
6630, 6633-6639, 666, 669	Universal	Zain
6966–6969, 6996, 6999	Universal	Rapid
6300, 6333, 6361, 6366, 7178	Universal	STC
77	Universal	Menatelecom
6441, 6670-6676, 66786-66788, 66797, 66799	Universal	Batelco

33782951

== See also ==
- Telecommunications in Bahrain
- Bahrain Mobile Number Database
