= Internet in Yemen =

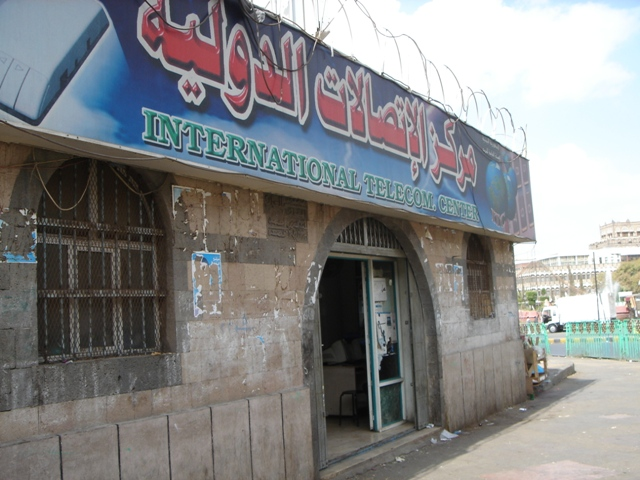
Internet Cafe in Sanaa

Use of the Internet in Yemen began in 1996 through the ISPs TeleYemen and the Public Telecommunications Corporation. The country uses the .ye domain. As of 2020, 14% of the population are Internet users.

== Growth ==
Rapid development of the telecommunications and information technology sectors in Yemen occurred from 2000 to 2005. The extent of investments in infrastructure development of telecom and IT systems came to more than YR 80 billion, in addition to loans of $31 million by the South Korean government. The number of Internet users increased from just 3,800 in 1991 to 110,000 in 2006, reaching 4,072,264 by 2010.

Mobile phone usage has also expanded. In 2006, there were 2.75 million mobile cellular subscribers. By 2023, the number of mobile cellular subscriptions had risen to 20 million.

There has been a huge demand for faster Internet connections in Yemen, and that pushed the two ISPs, TeleYemen, operators of the service YNET, and YemenNet, through the state's powerful Ministry of Telecommunications, to introduce ADSL and ISDN connections. Also, the E-government project that started to give the citizens the ability to access web services and finalize G2C transactions in 2000 increased the number of Internet users dramatically. But still the quality of speed is not that up to the mark. There were 84,000 fixed broadband subscriptions in 2010. By 2022, the number of broadband users stood at 486,000.

== Censorship ==
Internet censorship and surveillance by country (2018): Pervasive Substantial Selective / Little or no Not classified / No data

In a report by the OpenNet Initiative in October 2012, Yemen is listed as engaged in pervasive Internet censorship in social and political areas such as restrictions to Internet collaboration tools and in the conflict/security area.

Yemen was included in Reporters Without Borders list of countries "under surveillance" in 2008 and 2009, but not in 2010 or 2011.

Yemen censors pornography, nudity, gay and lesbian content, escort and dating services, sites displaying provocative attire, Web sites which present critical reviews of Islam and/or attempt to convert Muslims to other religions, or content related to alcohol, gambling, and drugs.

Yemen's Ministry of Information declared in April 2008 that the penal code will be used to prosecute writers who publish Internet content that "incites hatred" or "harms national interests". Yemen's two ISPs, YemenNet and TeleYemen, block access to gambling, adult, sex education, and some religious content. The ISP TeleYemen (aka Y.Net) prohibits "sending any message which is offensive on moral, religious, communal, or political grounds" and will report "any use or attempted use of the Y.Net service which contravenes any applicable Law of the Republic of Yemen". TeleYemen reserves the right to control access to data stored in its system “in any manner deemed appropriate by TeleYemen.”

In Yemen closed rooms or curtains that might obstruct views of the monitors are not allowed in Internet cafés, computer screens in Internet cafés must be visible to the floor supervisor, police have ordered some Internet cafés to close at midnight, and demanded that users show their identification cards to the café operator.

In March 2015, the Ministry of Yemen denied any plans to block Facebook after the last control by Houthis, though it has become apparent that the government applied bandwidth control filter to Facebook website in particular.

== AdenNet ==
Following the 2014 Battle of Sanaa, Houthi rebels took control of YemenNet, the country's major internet service provider. Government forces aligned with Abdrabbuh Mansur Hadi created AdenNet in June 2018 as an alternative ISP.

Network Allocation Quick-Reference

Carrier	GSM / CDMA Band	LTE Band (Frequency)
Yemen Mobile	BC0 (800 MHz)	Band 3 (1800 MHz)
Yemen 4G	None	Band 3 / 20 / 28 / 41
Sabafon	900 MHz	Band 3 (1800 MHz)
YOU	900 / 1800 MHz	Band 3 (1800 MHz)
Y Telecom	900 MHz	Band 3 (1800 MHz)

== See also ==
- Telecommunications in Yemen
- Y-Telecom, GSM provider in Yemen.
- Sabafon, GSM provider in Yemen.
- Yemeni Omani United (YOU - formerly MTN), GSM provider in Yemen, previously known as Spacetel and currently known as YOU.
- Yemen 4G, LTE provider in Yemen, known as TeleYemen (Yemeni International Telecommunications Company) is the exclusive licensed provider of international telecommunications and satellite communications services in Yemen. A fully state-owned entity under the Ministry of Telecommunications, it manages the country's international gateways, connects corporate customers, and facilitates satellite communications (including Thuraya).
