= West Asia =

Western region of Asia

- Area: 5,994,935 km^{2} (2,314,657 sq mi)^{a}
- Population: ▲319,131,725 (2026) (4th)
- Population density: 53.2/km^{2} (138/sq mi)
- GDP (PPP): ▲$12.940 trillion (2026)
- GDP (nominal): ▲$5.873 trillion (2026)
- GDP per capita: ▲$18,402 (2026; nominal), ▲$40,547 (2026; PPP)
- HDI: ▲0.755 (high)
- Ethnic groups: Arabs, Assyrians, Armenians, Azerbaijanis, Baloch, Georgians, Greek Cypriots, Jews, Kurds, Laz people, Mandaeans, Maronites, Persians, Pontic Greeks, Talyshis, Turks, Yazidis, Zazas, Lurs, Maronite Cypriots
- Religions: Islam, Christianity, Judaism, Baháʼí, Druzism, Yarsanism, Yazidism, Zoroastrianism, Mandaeism, Hinduism, Buddhism, etc.
- Demonym: West Asian; Western Asian
- Countries: 20 recognized: Armenia; Azerbaijan (except for a small portion of territory north of the Greater Caucasus); Bahrain; Cyprus; Egypt (only Sinai Peninsula); Georgia (except for a small portion of territory north of the Greater Caucasus); Iran; Iraq; Israel; Jordan; Kuwait; Lebanon; Oman; Palestine; Qatar; Saudi Arabia; Syria; Turkey (except East Thrace); United Arab Emirates; Yemen (except Socotra); 3 unrecognized: Abkhazia; Northern Cyprus; South Ossetia
- Dependencies: Akrotiri and Dhekelia
- Languages: Official languages: Arabic; Abkhaz; Armenian; Azerbaijani; English; Georgian; Greek; Hebrew; Kurdish; Ossetian; Persian; Russian; Turkish; Other languages: Afroasiatic: Neo-Aramaic; Amharic; South Arabian; Syriac; Austronesian: Indonesian; Malay; Filipino; Indo-European: Balochi; Domari; French; Gilaki; Hindi; Luri; Bengali; Mazanderani; Nepali; Pashto; Rohingya; Romani; Shabaki language; Spanish; Talysh; Urdu; Yiddish; Zaza; NE Caucasian: Avar; Chechen; Lezgian; NW Caucasian: Circassian; Kabardian; Turkic: Qashqai; Turkmen
- Time zones: 5 time zones: UTC+02:00: Standard: Cyprus, Israel, Jordan, Lebanon, Palestine, Sinai, Syria; UTC+03:00: Daylight: Cyprus, Israel, Jordan, Lebanon, Palestine, Syria; Standard: Bahrain, Iraq, Kuwait, Qatar, Saudi Arabia, Turkey, Yemen; UTC+03:30: Standard: Iran; UTC+04:00: Standard: Armenia, Azerbaijan, Georgia, Oman, UAE; UTC+04:30: Daylight savings Iran
- Internet TLD: .ae, .am, .az, .bh, .cy, .eg, .ge, .il, .iq, .ir, .jo, .kw, .lb, .om, .ps, .qa, .sa, .sy, .tr, .ye
- Calling codes: Zone 9 except Armenia, Cyprus (Zone 3) & Sinai (Zone 2)
- Largest cities: List^{b}: (Jordan) Amman; (Turkey) Ankara; (Iraq) Baghdad; (United Arab Emirates) Dubai; (Turkey) Istanbul; (Turkey) İzmir; (Saudi Arabia) Jeddah; Kuwait City; (Saudi Arabia) Riyadh; (Iran) Tehran
- UN M49 codes: 145 – West Asia; 142 – Asia; 001 – World
- ^{a} Area and population figures include the Sinai ^{b} Among the top 100 urban areas of the world by population

West Asia (also called Western Asia or Southwest Asia) is the westernmost region of Asia. As defined by most academics, UN bodies and other institutions, the subregion consists of Anatolia, the Arabian Peninsula, Iran, Mesopotamia, the Armenian highlands, the Levant, the Sinai Peninsula and the South Caucasus. The region is separated from Africa by the Isthmus of Suez in Egypt, and separated from Europe by the waterways of the Turkish Straits and the watershed of the Greater Caucasus. Central Asia lies to its northeast, while South Asia lies to its east. Twelve seas surround the region (clockwise): the Aegean Sea, the Sea of Marmara, the Black Sea, the Caspian Sea, the Persian Gulf, the Gulf of Oman, the Arabian Sea, the Gulf of Aden, the Red Sea, the Gulf of Aqaba, the Gulf of Suez, and the Mediterranean Sea. West Asia contains the majority of the similarly defined Middle East, but excludes most of Egypt and the northwestern part of Turkey, and includes the southern part of the Caucasus.

West Asia covers an area of 5,994,935 km^{2} (2,314,657 sq mi), with a population of about 313 million. Of the 20 UN member countries fully or partly within the region, 13 are part of the Arab world. The most populous countries in West Asia are Iran, Turkey, Iraq, Yemen, and Saudi Arabia.

In the World Geographical Scheme for Recording Plant Distributions (WGSRPD), West Asia excludes the Arabian Peninsula and includes Afghanistan. The Food and Agriculture Organization (FAO) excludes Egypt and includes Afghanistan. The United Nations Environment Programme excludes Cyprus, Israel, Turkey, and Iran from West Asia.

== Definition ==
The term West Asia is used pragmatically and has no "correct" or generally accepted definition. Its typical definitions overlap substantially, but not entirely, with definitions of the terms Middle East, Eastern Mediterranean, and Near East. The National Geographic Style Manual as well as Maddison's The World Economy: Historical Statistics (2003) by the Organisation for Economic Co-operation and Development (OECD) include only Bahrain, Iran, Iraq, Israel, Jordan, Kuwait, Lebanon, Oman, Qatar, Palestine (called West Bank and Gaza in the latter), Saudi Arabia, Syria, Turkey, UAE, and Yemen as West Asian countries. By contrast, the United Nations Industrial Development Organization (UNIDO) in its 2015 yearbook includes Armenia and Azerbaijan, and excludes Israel (as Other) and Turkey (as Europe).

Unlike the UNIDO, the United Nations Statistics Division (UNSD) excludes Iran from West Asia (included as South Asia) and includes Turkey, Georgia, and Cyprus in the region. In the United Nations geopolitical Eastern European Group, Armenia and Georgia are included in Eastern Europe, whereas Cyprus and East Thracian Turkey are in Southern Europe. These three nations are listed in the European category of the United Nations Educational, Scientific, and Cultural Organisation (UNESCO).

National members of West Asian sports governing bodies are limited to Bahrain, Iran, Iraq, Jordan, Kuwait, Lebanon, Syria, Oman, Palestine, Qatar, Saudi Arabia, United Arab Emirates, and Yemen. The Olympic Council of Asia's multi-sport event West Asian Games are contested by athletes representing these 13 countries. Among the region's sports organisations are the West Asia Basketball Association, West Asian Billiards and Snooker Federation, West Asian Football Federation, and the West Asian Tennis Federation.

=== Map ===
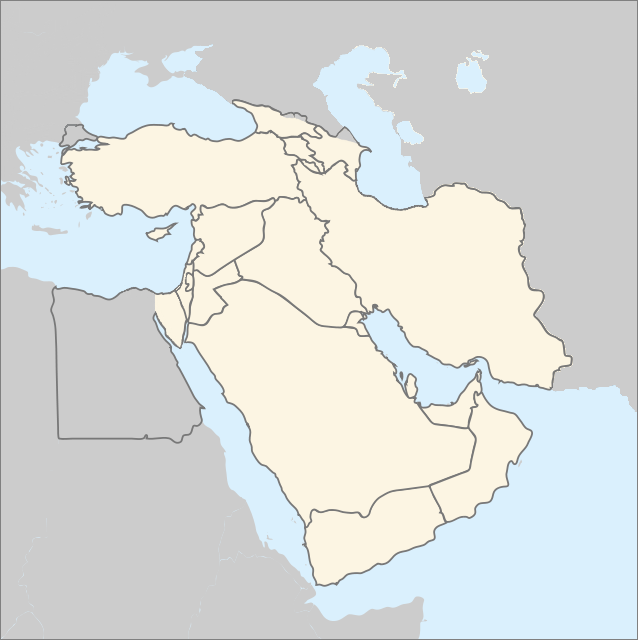

== Countries ==
Country	Area (km^{2})	Population (2021)	Density (per km^{2})	Capital	Nominal GDP (2026)	Per capita (2026)	Currency	Government	Official languages
Turkey (Note: The figures for Turkey includes East Thrace, which is not a part of Anatolia.)	783,562	84,775,404	94.1	Ankara	$1,640.223 billion	$19,018	Turkish lira	Presidential republic	Turkish
Bahrain	780	1,463,265	1,646.1	Manama	$48.849 billion	$29,569	Bahraini dinar	Constitutional monarchy	Arabic
Kuwait	17,820	4,250,114	167.5	Kuwait City	$172.920 billion	$33,164	Kuwaiti dinar	Constitutional monarchy	Arabic
Oman	212,460	4,520,471	9.2	Muscat	$117.176 billion	$21,645	Omani rial	Absolute monarchy	Arabic
Qatar	11,437	2,688,235	123.2	Doha	$217.416 billion	$68,138	Qatari riyal	Absolute monarchy	Arabic
Saudi Arabia	2,149,690	35,950,396	12	Riyadh	$1,388.676 billion	$37,811	Saudi riyal	Absolute monarchy	Arabic
United Arab Emirates	82,880	9,365,145	97	Abu Dhabi	$621.546 billion	$54,214	UAE dirham	Federal constitutional monarchy	Arabic
Yemen	527,970	32,981,641	44.7	Sanaa (Note: A rebel group, the Houthis, have their government at Aden (Seat of government))	$7.435 billion	$384	Yemeni rial	Provisional presidential republic	Arabic
Abkhazia (Note: unrecognized)	8,660	242,862	28	Sokhumi	N/A	N/A	Georgian lari	Semi-presidential republic	Abkhaz, Russian
Armenia	29,800	2,790,974	108.4	Yerevan	$31.873 billion	$10,410	Armenian dram	Semi-presidential republic	Armenian
Azerbaijan	86,600	10,312,992	105.8	Baku	$78.372 billion	$7,467	Azerbaijani manat	Presidential republic	Azerbaijani
Georgia	69,700	3,757,980	68.1	Tbilisi	$42.716 billion	$11,574	Georgian lari	Semi-presidential republic	Georgian
South Ossetia (Note: unrecognized)	3,900	53,532	13	Tskhinvali	N/A	N/A	Georgian lari	Semi-presidential republic	Ossetian, Russian
Iraq	438,317	43,533,592	73.5	Baghdad	$264.784 billion	$5,677	Iraqi dinar	Parliamentary republic	Arabic, Kurdish
Israel	20,770	8,900,059	365.3	Jerusalem (Note: Jerusalem is the proclaimed capital of Israel and the actual location of the Knesset, Israeli Supreme Court, etc. Due to its disputed status, most embassies are in Tel Aviv. (Note: Jerusalem is Israel's de jure capital under Israeli law, as well as its de facto capital by the location of the presidential residence, government offices, supreme court and parliament (Knesset). Jerusalem is the State of Palestine's de jure capital under its "2003 Amended Basic Law". 17 February 2008, but not its de facto capital as its government branches are based in Ramallah. The UN and most sovereign states do not recognize Jerusalem as either state's de jure capital under the position that Jerusalem's status is pending future negotiations between Israel and the Palestinian Authority. In practice, therefore, most maintain their embassies in Tel Aviv and its suburbs, or else in suburbs such as Mevaseret Zion outside Jerusalem proper. See CIA Factbook, "Map of Israel" (PDF) and Status of Jerusalem for more information.))	$719.848 billion	$69,804	Israeli new shekel	Parliamentary republic	Hebrew
Jordan	92,300	11,148,278	68.4	Amman	$64.909 billion	$5,601	Jordanian dinar	Constitutional monarchy	Arabic
Lebanon	10,452	5,592,631	404	Beirut	$34.497 billion	$6,443	Lebanese pound	Parliamentary republic	Arabic
Palestine (Note: UN observer state.)	6,220	5,133,392	667	Ramallah (Note: Ramallah is the actual location of the government, whereas the proclaimed capital of Palestine is Jerusalem, which is disputed.)	$17.167 billion	$3,171	Egyptian pound, Jordanian dinar, Israeli new shekel	Semi-presidential republic	Arabic
Syria	185,180	21,324,367	118.3	Damascus	N/A	N/A	Syrian pound	Transitional government	Arabic
Iran	1,648,195	87,923,432	45	Tehran	$300.293 billion	$3,415	Iranian rial	Islamic republic	Persian
Akrotiri and Dhekelia (Note: British Overseas Territory)	254	15,700	N/A	Episkopi	N/A	N/A	Euro	Stratocratic dependency under a constitutional monarchy	English
Cyprus	9,250	1,244,188	117	Nicosia	$45.171 billion	$45,409	Euro	Presidential republic	Greek, Turkish
Egypt (Note: The area and population figures for Egypt only include the Sinai Peninsula.)	60,000	600,000	82	Cairo	$429.645 billion	$3,904	Egyptian pound	Presidential republic	Arabic

== History ==
"Western Asia" was in use as a geographical term in the late 18th and early 19th centuries, before "Near East" became current as a geopolitical concept. For example, William Ouseley used the phrase in 1795 in Persian Miscellanies to refer to a region including Syria, Mesopotamia, Chaldea and Persia. In the context of the history of classical antiquity, "Western Asia" could mean the part of Asia known in classical antiquity, as opposed to the reaches of "interior Asia", i.e. Scythia, and "Eastern Asia" the easternmost reaches of geographical knowledge in classical authors, i.e. Transoxania and India. In the 20th century, "Western Asia" was used to denote a rough geographical era in the fields of archaeology and ancient history, especially as a shorthand for "the Fertile Crescent, excluding Ancient Egypt" for the purposes of comparing the early civilizations of Egypt and the former.

Use of the term in the context of contemporary geopolitics or world economy appears to date from at least the mid-1960s.

== Geography ==
The region is surrounded by eight major seas; the Aegean Sea, the Black Sea, the Caspian Sea, the Persian Gulf, the Arabian Sea, the Gulf of Aden, the Red Sea, and the Mediterranean Sea.

To the northwest and north, the region is delimited from Europe by the Turkish Straits and drainage divide of the Greater Caucasus, to the southwest, it is delimited from Africa by the Isthmus of Suez, while to the northeast and east, the region adjoins Central Asia and South Asia. The region is located east of Southern Europe and south of Eastern Europe.

The Dasht-e Kavir and Dasht-e Lut deserts in eastern Iran naturally delimit the region from Balochistan and South Asia.

=== Geology ===
==== Plate tectonics ====
Three major tectonic plates converge on West Asia, including the African, Eurasian, and Arabian plates. The boundaries between the tectonic plates make up the Azores-Gibraltar Ridge, extending across North Africa, the Red Sea, and into Iran. The Arabian Plate is moving northward into the Anatolian plate (Turkey) at the East Anatolian Fault, and the boundary between the Aegean and Anatolian plate in eastern Turkey is also seismically active.

==== Water resources ====
Several major aquifers provide water to large portions of West Asia. In Saudi Arabia, two large aquifers of Palaeozoic and Triassic origins are located beneath the Jabal Tuwayq mountains and areas west to the Red Sea. Cretaceous and Eocene-origin aquifers are located beneath large portions of central and eastern Saudi Arabia, including Wasia and Biyadh which contain amounts of both fresh water and saline water. Flood or furrow irrigation, as well as sprinkler methods, are extensively used for irrigation, covering nearly 90,000 km^{2} (35,000 sq mi) across West Asia for agriculture. Also, the Tigris and Euphrates rivers contribute very well.

=== Climate ===
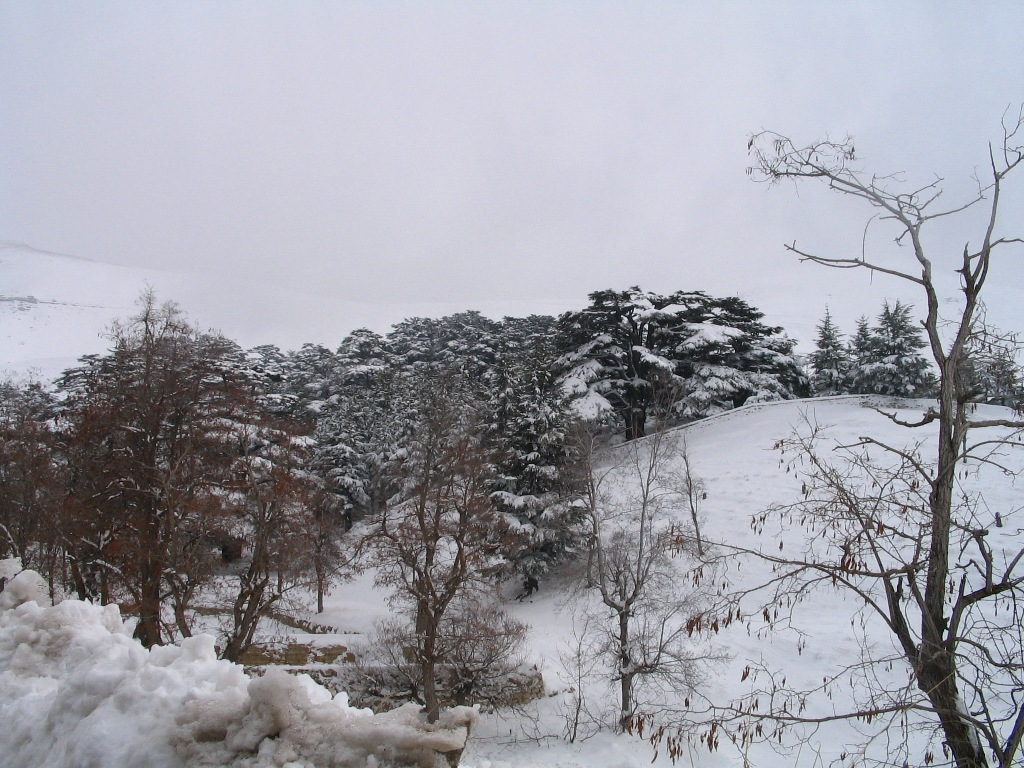
A Lebanese Cedar Forest in winter

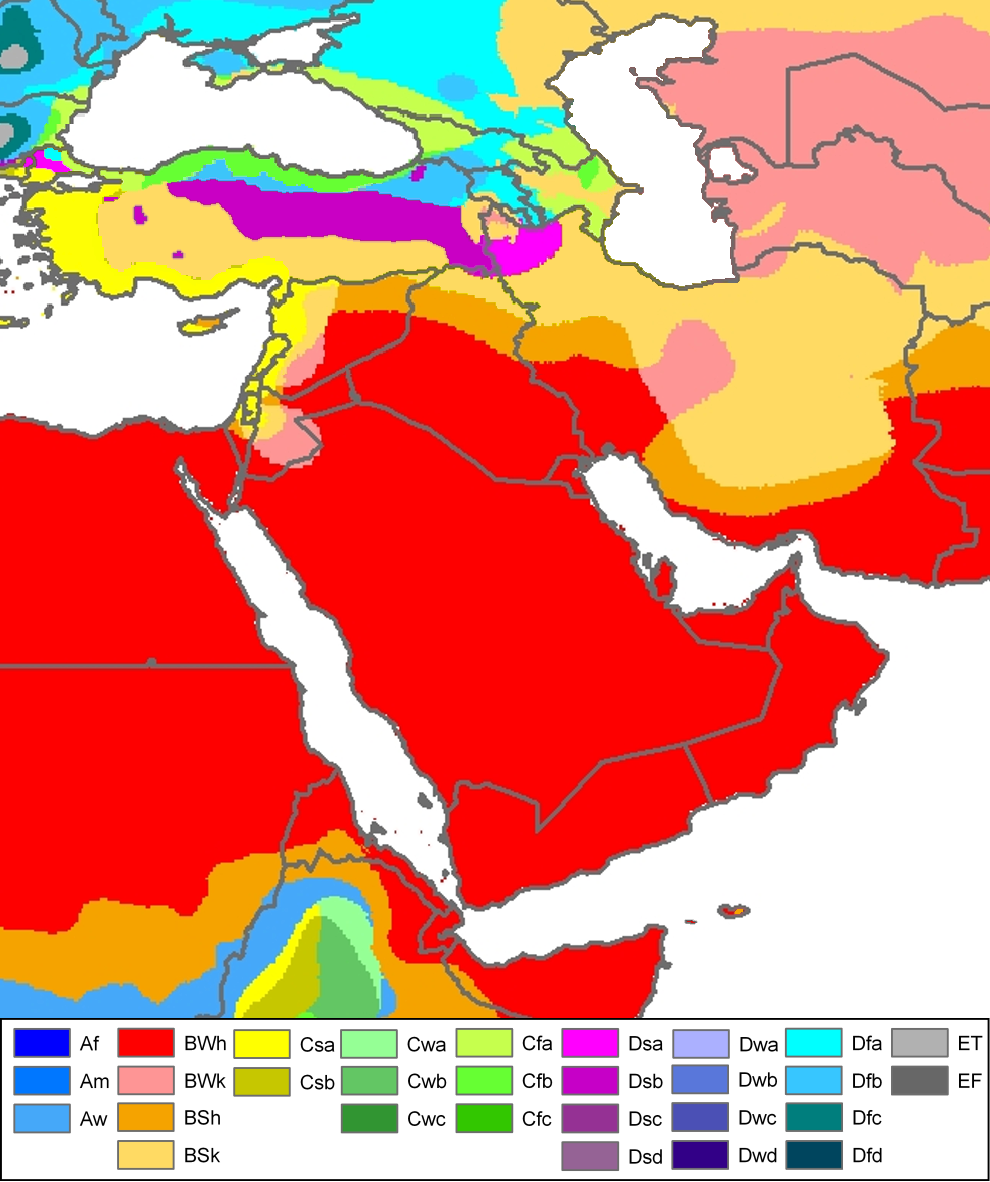
Köppen climate classification map of West Asia

West Asia is primarily arid and semi-arid, and can be subject to drought, but it also contains vast expanses of forest and fertile valleys. The region consists of grasslands, rangelands, deserts, and mountains. Water shortages are a problem in many parts of West Asia, with rapidly growing populations increasing demands for water, while salinization and pollution threaten water supplies. Major rivers, including the Tigris and Euphrates, provide sources for irrigation water to support agriculture.

There are two wind phenomena in West Asia: the sharqi and the shamal. The sharqi (or sharki) is a wind that comes from the south and southeast. It is seasonal, lasting from April to early June, and comes again between late September and November. The winds are dry and dusty, with occasional gusts up to 80 kilometres per hour (50 miles per hour) and often kick up violent sand and dust storms that can carry sand a few thousand meters high, and can close down airports for short periods of time. These winds can last for a full day at the beginning and end of the season, and for several days during the middle of the season. The shamal is a summer northwesterly wind blowing over Iraq and the Persian Gulf states (including Saudi Arabia and Kuwait), often strong during the day, but decreasing at night. This weather effect occurs anywhere from once to several times a year.

=== Topography ===
West Asia contains large areas of mountainous terrain. The Anatolian Plateau is sandwiched between the Pontus Mountains and Taurus Mountains in Turkey. Mount Ararat in Turkey rises to 5,137 m (16,854 ft). The Zagros Mountains are located in Iran, in areas along its border with Iraq. The Central Plateau of Iran is divided into two drainage basins. The northern basin is Dasht-e Kavir (Great Salt Desert), and Dasht-e-Lut is the southern basin.

In Yemen, elevations exceed 3,700 m (12,100 ft) in many areas, and highland areas extend north along the Red Sea coast and north into Lebanon. A fault zone also exists along the Red Sea, with continental rifting creating trough-like topography with areas located well below sea level. The Dead Sea, located on the border between the West Bank, Israel, and Jordan, is situated at 418 m (1,371 ft) below sea level, making it the lowest point on the surface of the Earth.

Rub' al Khali, one of the world's largest sand deserts, spans the southern third of the Arabian Peninsula in Saudi Arabia, parts of Oman, the United Arab Emirates and Yemen. Jebel al Akhdar is a small range of mountains located in northeastern Oman, bordering the Gulf of Oman.

== Economy ==
The economy of West Asia is diverse and the region experiences high economic growth. Turkey has the largest economy in the region, followed by Saudi Arabia and Iran. Petroleum is the major industry in the regional economy, as more than half of the world's oil reserves and around 40 percent of the world's natural gas reserves are located in the region.

== Demographics ==
The population of West Asia was estimated at 272 million as of 2008, projected to reach 370 million by 2030 by Maddison (2007; the estimate excludes the Caucasus and Cyprus). This corresponds to an annual growth rate of 1.4% (or a doubling time of 50 years), well above the world average of 0.9% (doubling time 75 years). The population of West Asia is estimated at 4% of world population, up from about 39 million at the beginning of the 20th century, or about 2% of world population at the time.

The most populous countries in the region are Turkey and Iran, each with around 79 million people, followed by Iraq and Saudi Arabia with around 33 million people each, and Yemen with around 29 million people.

Numerically, West Asia is predominantly Arab, Persian, Turkish, and the dominating languages are correspondingly Arabic, Persian and Turkish, each with of the order of 70 million speakers, followed by smaller communities of Kurdish, Azerbaijani, Hebrew, Armenian and Neo-Aramaic. The dominance of Arabic and Turkish is the result of the medieval Arab and Turkic invasions beginning with the Islamic conquests of the 7th century AD, which displaced the formerly dominant Aramaic in the region of Syria, and Greek in Anatolia, although Hebrew became the dominant language in Israel in the second half of the 20th century, and Neo-Aramaic (spoken by modern Arameans and Assyrians) and Greek both remain present in their respective territories as minority languages.

Significant native minorities include, in alphabetical order: Arameans, Assyrians, Druze, Jews, Lurs, Mandeans, Maronites, Shabaks and Yezidis.

=== Religion ===
Religion in West Asia (2020)
1. Islam (92.6%)
2. Christianity (3.87%)
3. Judaism (2.02%)
4. No religion (1.16%)
5. Hinduism (0.32%)
6. Other religions (0.25%)
7. Buddhism (0.15%)
8. Folk religions (0.06%)

Four major religious groups (i.e. the two largest religions in the world: Christianity and Islam, plus Judaism and Druze Faith) originated in West Asia. Islam is the largest religion in West Asia, but other faiths that originated there, such as Christianity and Judaism, are also well represented.

In Armenia and Georgia, Oriental Orthodoxy and Eastern Orthodoxy respectively are the predominant religions. Eastern Orthodoxy is also the majority religion in Cyprus. There are still large ancient communities of Eastern Christians (such as Assyrians, Middle Eastern Christians and Arab Christians) in Lebanon, Iraq, Iran, Turkey, Azerbaijan, Syria, Jordan, Israel and Palestine numbering more than 3 million in West Asia. There are also large populations of expatriate workers which include sizeable Christian communities living in the Arabian Peninsula numbering more than 3 million. Christian communities have played a vital role in West Asia.

Judaism is the predominant religion in Israel, and there are small ancient Jewish communities in West Asia such as in Turkey (14,300), Azerbaijan (9,100), and Iran (8,756).

The Druze Faith or Druzism originated in West Asia. It is a monotheistic religion based on the teachings of figures like Hamza ibn-'Ali ibn-Ahmad and Al-Hakim bi-Amr Allah and Greek philosophers such as Plato and Aristotle. The number of Druze people worldwide is around one million, with about 45% to 50% living in Syria, 35% to 40% living in Lebanon, and less than 10% living in Israel; recently there has been a growing Druze diaspora.

There are also important minority religions like the Baháʼí Faith, Yarsanism, Yazidism, Zoroastrianism, Mandaeism, and Shabakism.

Religions in West Asia

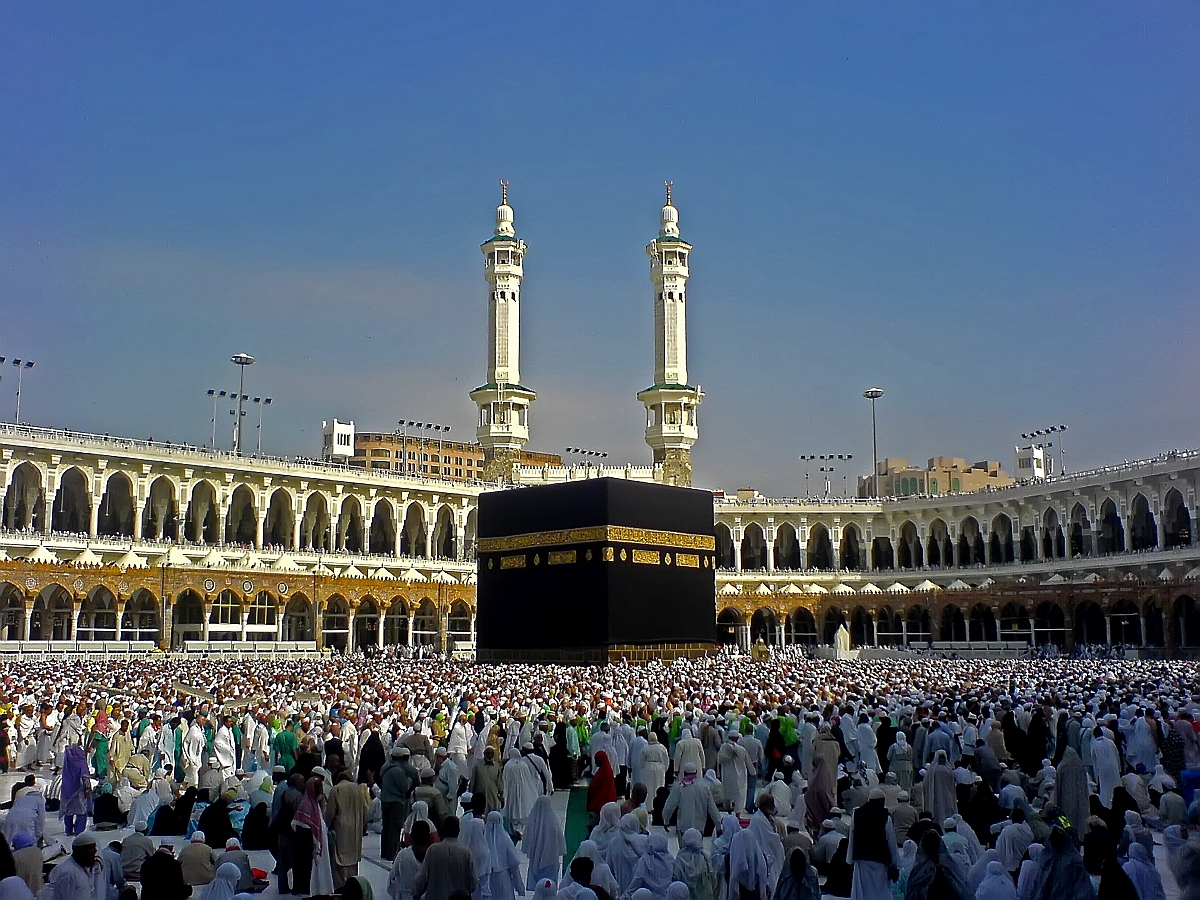
Pilgrims in the annual Hajj at the Kaaba in Mecca.

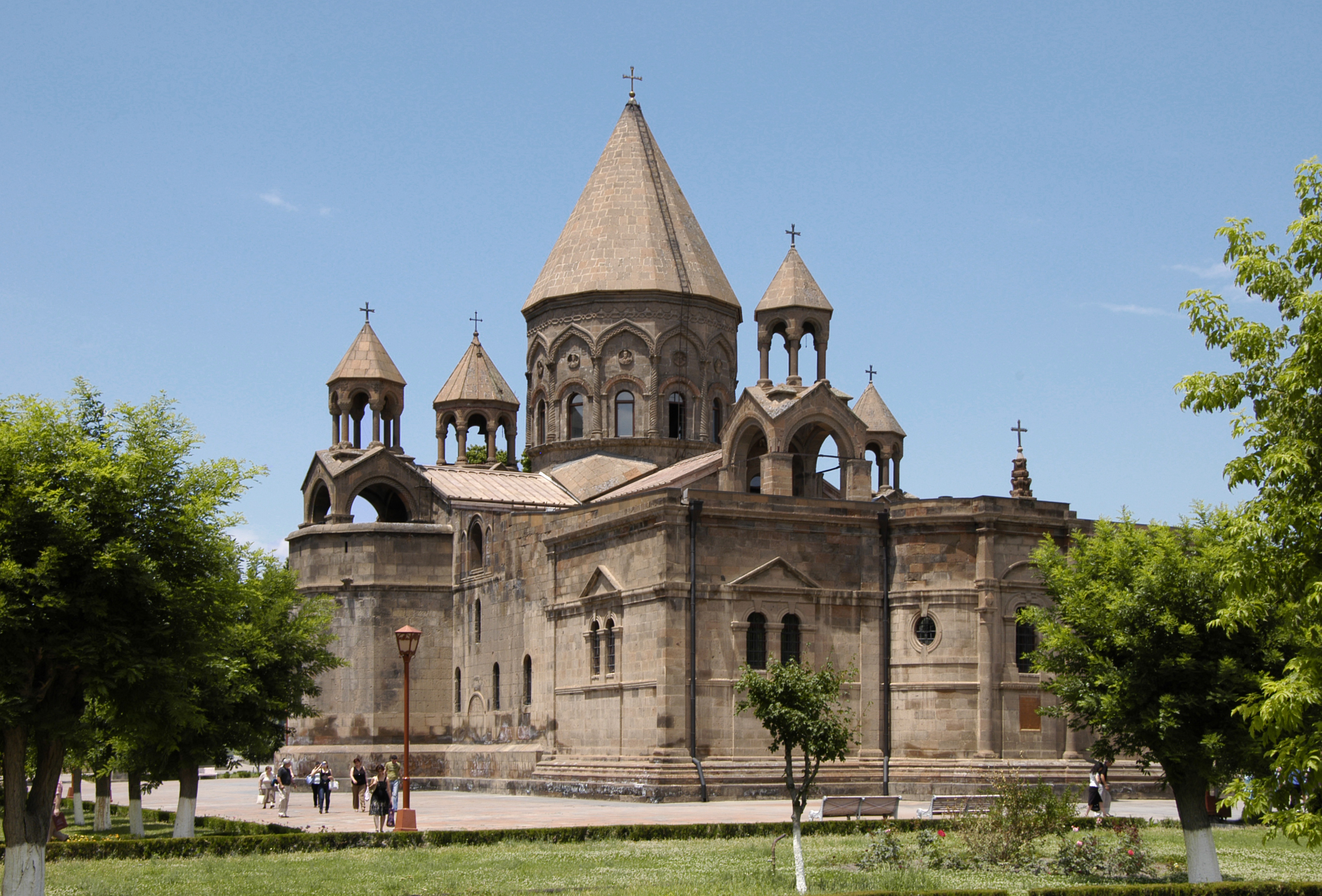
Etchmiadzin Cathedral, first cathedral in the world, the mother church of all Armenians

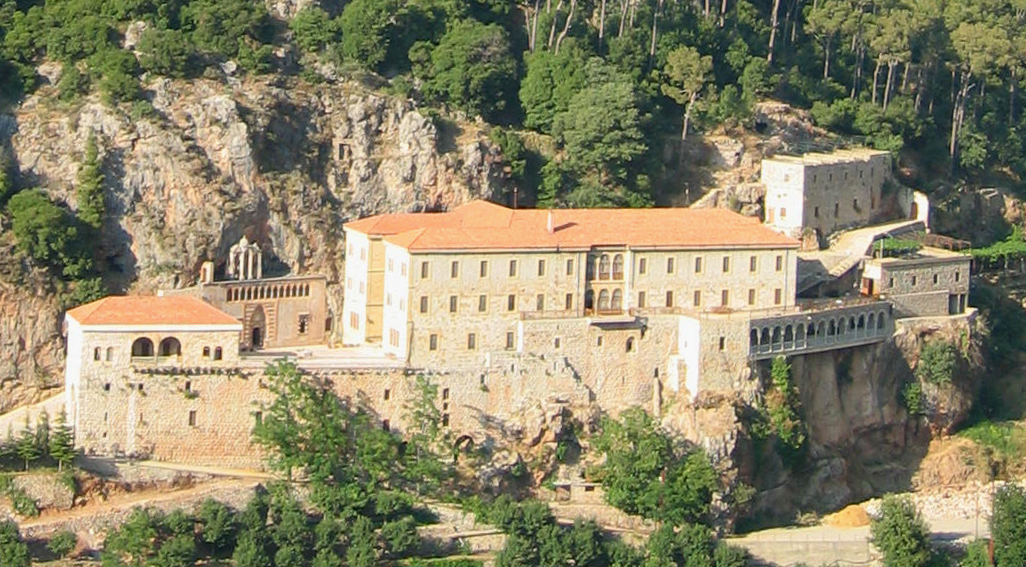
Monastery of Saint Anthony of Qozhaya in Lebanon.

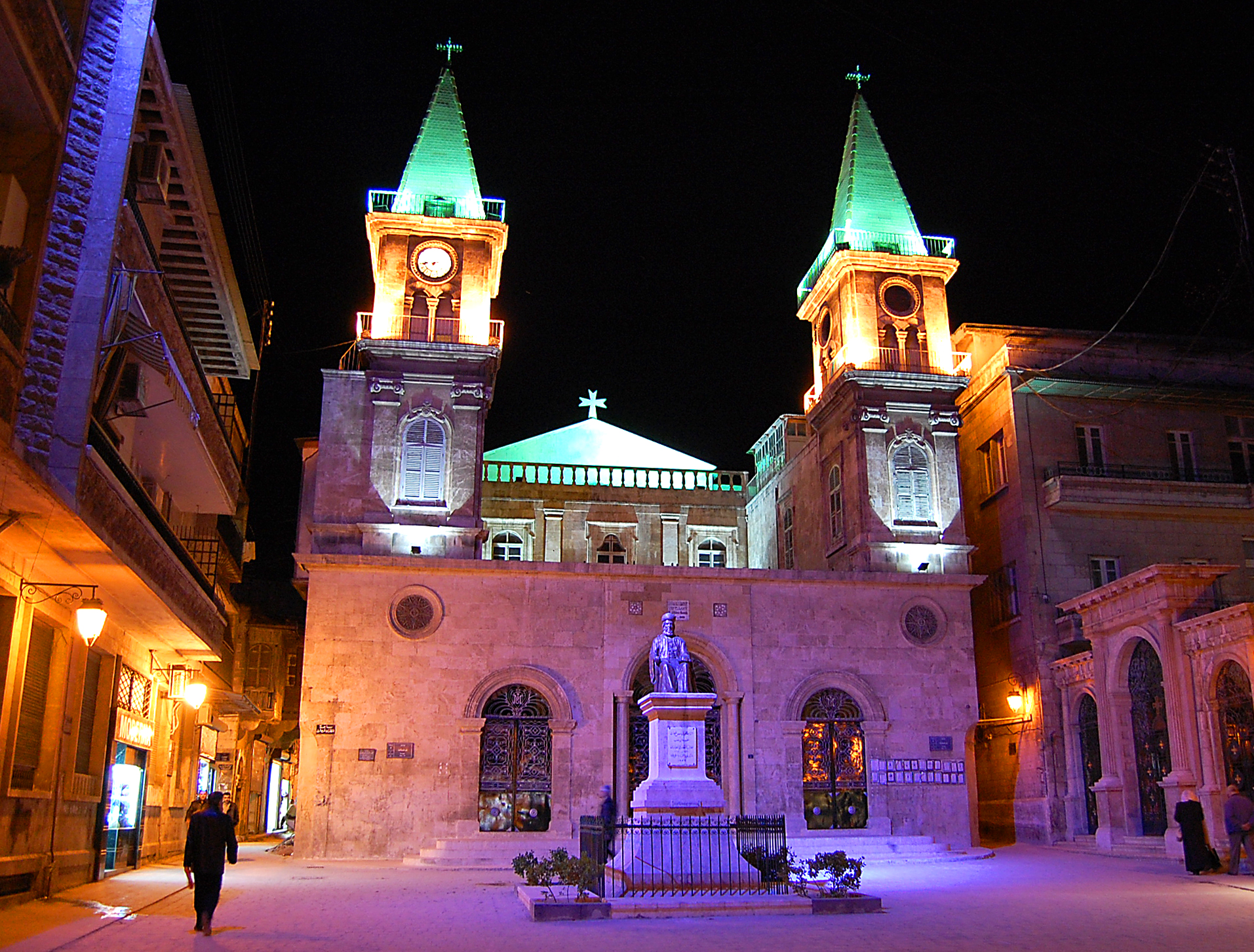
Cathedral of Saint Elijah, Aleppo.

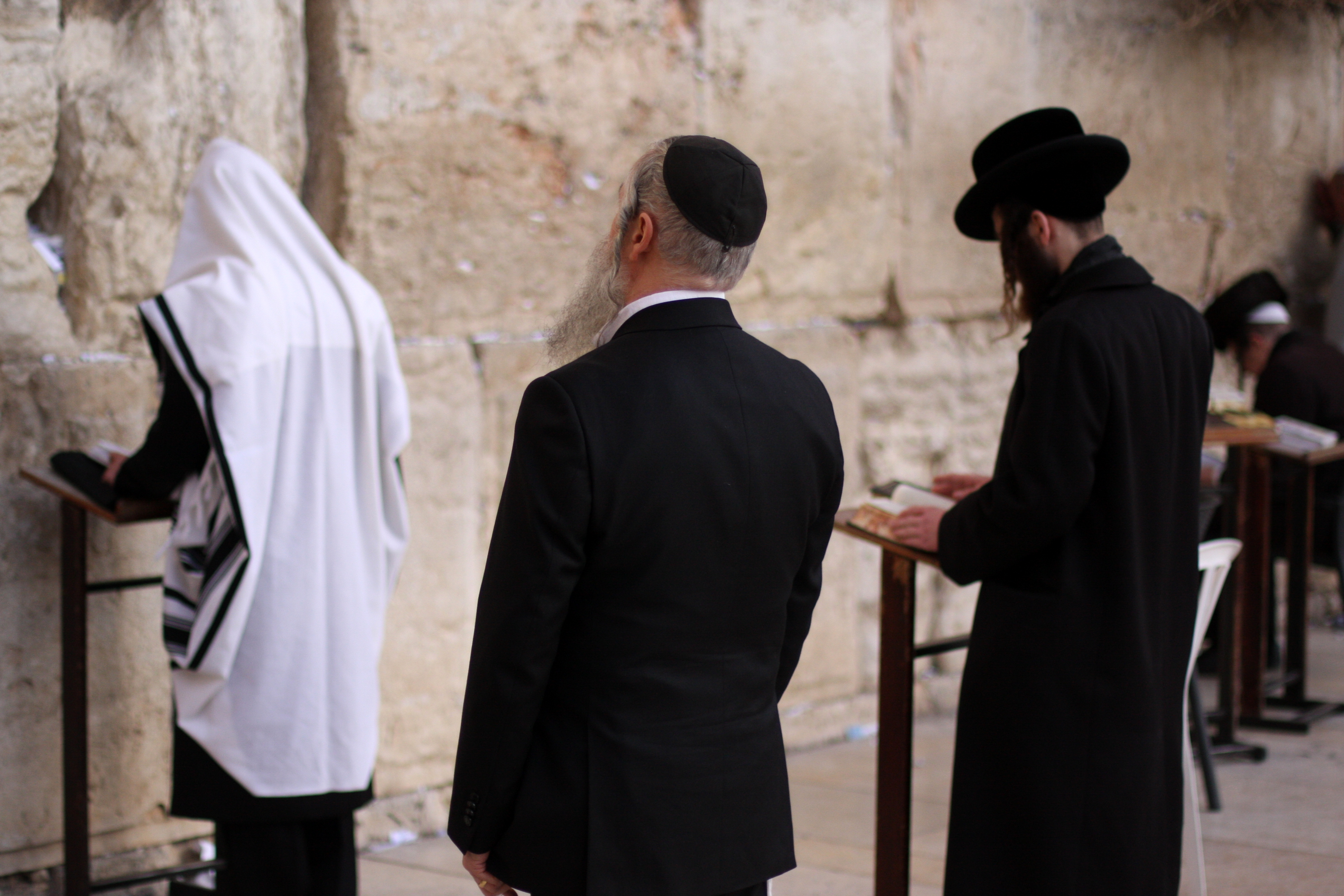
Jews praying at the Western Wall.

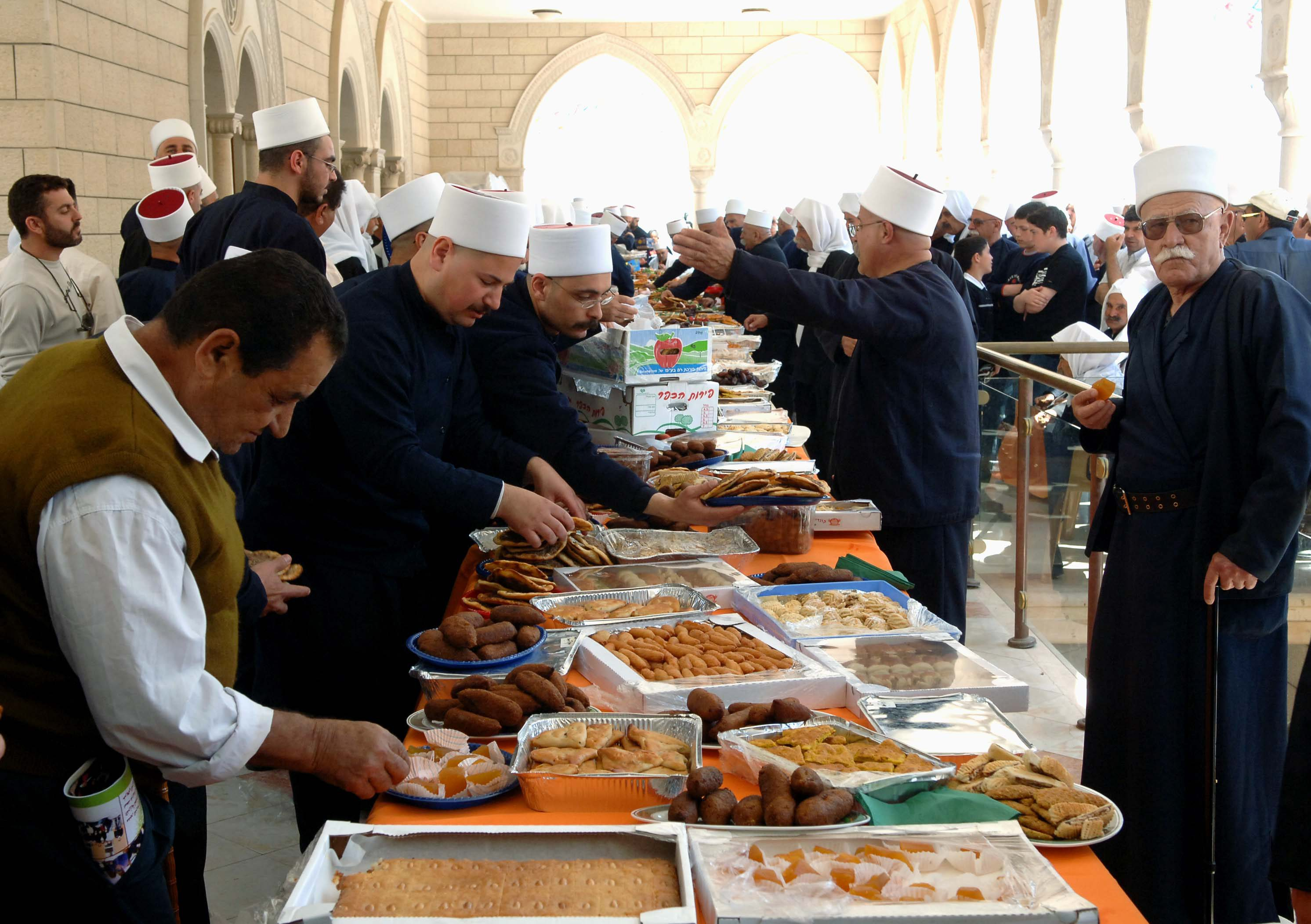
Druze dignitaries celebrating the Ziyarat al-Nabi Shu'ayb festival at the tomb of the prophet in Hittin

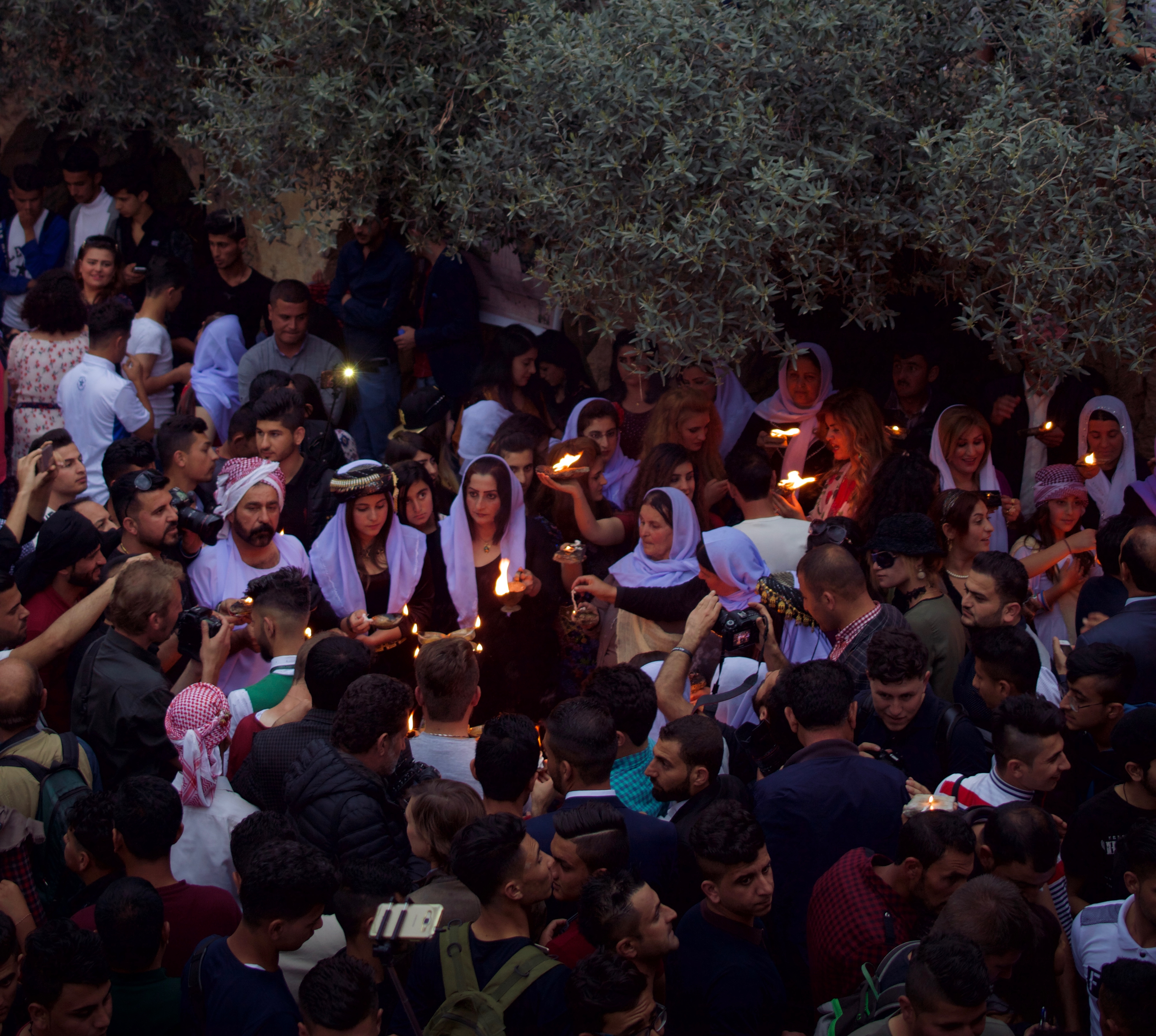
Yazidi pilgrims celebrating the Yazidi new year festival at the ancient holy temple of Lalish, Iraq

== Culture ==
=== Sports ===
- The West Asian Tennis Federation regulates the championships and leagues in the region.
- The West Asian Billiards & Snooker Federation regulates the championships related to billiards and snooker, amongst which an annual tournament.
- The West Asian Games have been held in 1997, 2002 and 2005.
- The West Asian Football Federation was founded in 2001 and is one of the regional federations of the Asian Football Federation. They organize the WAFF Championship.
- The West Asia Basketball Association organizes the WABA Championship since 1999.

== See also ==
- Middle East
- Cinema of West Asia
- List of World Heritage Sites in Western Asia
- West Asian Games
- West Asian Basketball League
- West Asia Basketball Association
- West Asian Billiards & Snooker Federation
- West Asian Tennis Federation
- West Asian Football Federation
