= Telephone numbers in Iran =

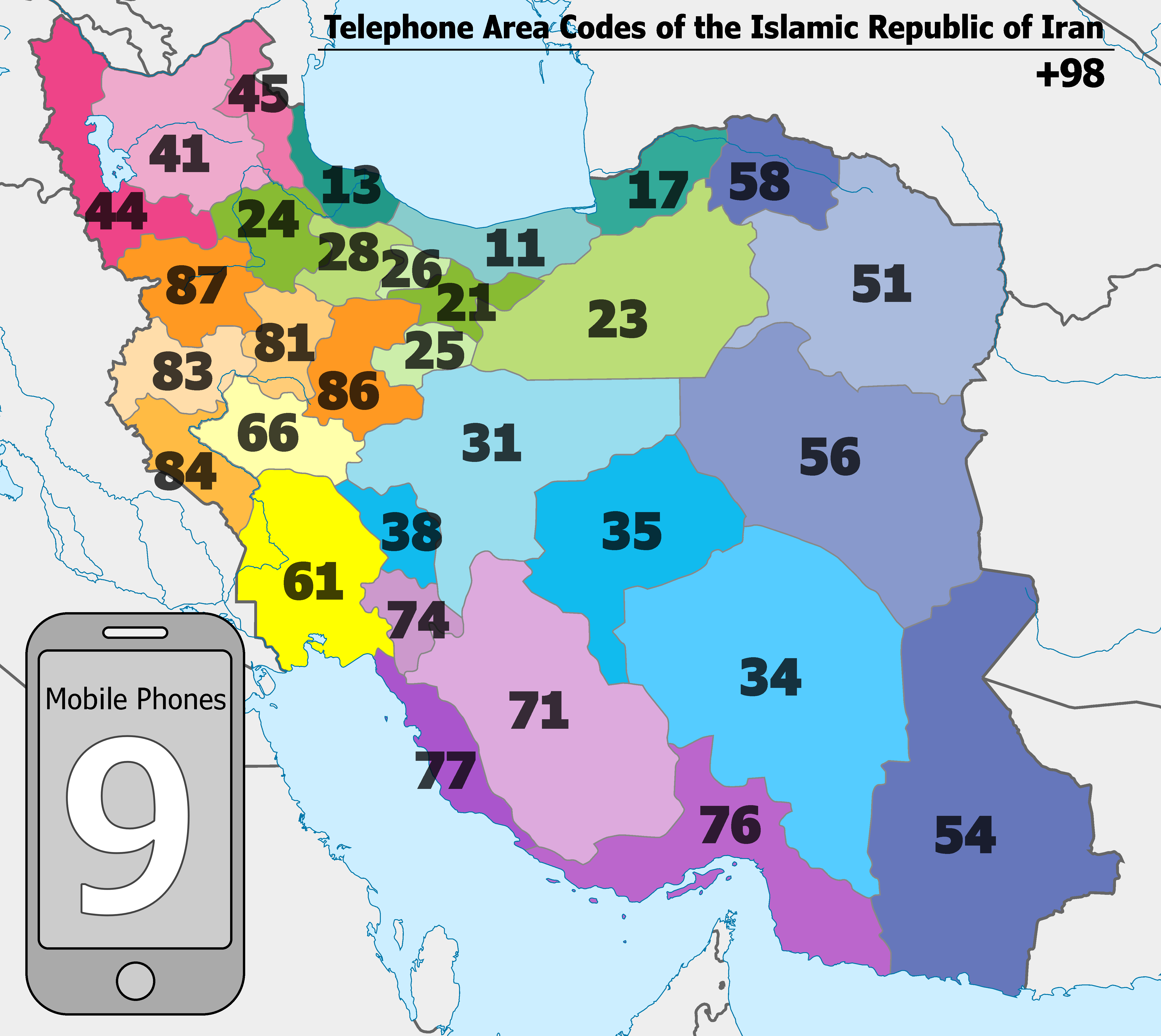
- Telephone Dialing Codes in Iran
- Country: Iran
- Continent: Asia
- Regulator: Ministry of Information and Communications Technology of Iran
- Numbering plan type: Closed
- NSN length: 10
- Format: various, see text
- Country code: 98
- Long-distance: 0

Telephone numbers in Iran consist of an area code and a subscriber number. The dial plan type in Iran is closed, and "0" is the internal trunk prefix in Iran, while the country calling code is +98. the country's telephone numbers are regulated by the Ministry of Information and Communications Technology of Iran.

== Format ==
All telephone numbers are 11 digits long (including the internal trunk prefix). The first two digits are the area code. The possibilities are: (0XX) XXXX XXXX (for landlines), 09XX XXX XXXX (for cellphones) and 099XX XXX XXX (for MVNO).

Either of the trunk prefixes may be used when making an internal national call.

When making a call within the same landline area code, the trunk prefix and the area code can be omitted.

== Landlines ==
Landlines telephone numbers have these formats: (0AC) XXXX XXXX (within Iran) and +98 AC XXXX XXXX (outside Iran). where AC is the area code shown in the list below

=== Area code ===
List of Area Codes
No.	Province	Area Code
Area 1
1	Mazandaran	11
2	Gilan	13
3	Golestan	17
Area 2
4	Tehran	21
5	Semnan	23
6	Zanjan	24
7	Qom	25
8	Alborz	26
9	Qazvin	28
Area 3
10	Isfahan	31
11	Kerman	34
12	Yazd	35
13	Chaharmahal and Bakhtiari	38
Area 4
14	East Azerbaijan	41
15	West Azerbaijan	44
16	Ardabil	45
Area 5
17	Razavi Khorasan	51
18	Sistan and Baluchestan	54
19	South Khorasan	56
20	North Khorasan	58
Area 6
21	Khuzestan	61
22	Lorestan	66
Area 7
23	Fars	71
24	Kohgiluyeh and Boyer-Ahmad	74
25	Hormozgan	76
26	Bushehr	77
Area 8
27	Hamadan	81
28	Kermanshah	83
29	Ilam	84
30	Markazi	86
31	Kurdistan	87

=== Premium-rate telephone number ===
Premium-rate telephone number has these formats :

- 7020 XXXX: Provincial
- 7070 XXXX: access from all provinces
- 909 AAC XXXX. AAC (available area code) shown in below list :

only landline numbers can call these numbers

List of Available Area Code
No.	Area	Available Area Code	Numbers Format
1	access from all provinces	907	909 907 XXXX
2	universal access numbers	221	909 221 XXXX
3	access from Tehran province	230	909 230 XXXX
4	access from Qom province	252	909 252 XXXX
5	access from West Azerbaijan province	444	909 444 XXXX
6	access from Razavi Khorasan province	512	909 512 XXXX

=== Free phone numbers ===
Free phone numbers have these formats :

- 900 212 XXXX
- 9000 XXXX

only landline numbers can call these numbers

=== Personal number service ===
Personal number service has this format : 8080 XXXX

=== SIP Trunk ===
Provincial
needs an area code by landline in different province or via a cellphone

- 9100 XXXX: ShatelTalk (Shatel)
- 9101 XXXX: AsiaTel (AsiaTech)
- 9102 XXXX: SabaTel (SabaNet)
- 9103 XXXX: Fanap Telecom
- 9107 XXXX: NexFon (Respina)
- 9108 XXXX: FanAva
- 9109 XXXX: Pishgaman
- 9130 XXXX: AsiaTel (AsiaTech)
- 9131 XXXX: Lazer
- 9132 XXXX: Shatel
- 9155 XXXX: TakNet
- 9311 XXXX: Wenex (Ertebatat-e Farzanegan Pars)
- 9411 XXXX: AloIran (MacTel, MagTel, Montazeran-e Adl Gostar) (Not Working)
- 9511 XXXX: Arian Rasaneh Pars (Not Working)
- 966x XXXX: AloTehran (Zoha Kish, Mehr Media)
- 9686 XXXX: AloTehran (Zoha Kish, Mehr Media)

Country

- 94220 XXXXX: AsiaTel
- 94260 XXXXX: NexFon

=== Universal access number ===
This service allows a subscriber to publish a national number and have the incoming calls routed to different destinations based on various criteria such as the geographical location of the caller, the time of day and the date on which the call is made.

only landline numbers can call these numbers

Universal access number has these formats :

- 909 221 XXXX
- 8081 XXXX

== Mobile phones ==
In order to identify the country which a mobile subscriber belongs to, in wireless telephone networks (GSM, CDMA, UMTS, etc.) Mobile Country Codes (MCC) are used. MCC is allocated by the International Telecommunication Union (ITU) and MCC for Iran is 432.

If you intend to use your SIM card, make sure to put your phone on flight mode after using SIM cards from Iranian companies. Irancell, Hamrah Aval and RighTel are the main 3 phone operators in Iran. Fortunately the existing mobile network provides 4G & 5G cellular data coverage in all the small and big cities around the country. Also in most of the main roads between cities you can have access to call and data services.

In order to identify mobile subscriber in a country, Mobile Network Code (MNC) are used. MNC is allocated by the national regulator. (e.g. MNC for IR-MCI is 11)

The Home Network Identity (HNI) is the combination of the MCC and the MNC. This is the number which fully identifies a mobile subscriber. This combination is also known as the PLMN. (e.g. HNI for IR-MCI with MNC = 11 and MCC of Iran = 432 will be 43211)

There are 9 mobile phone providers in Iran, listed below.

=== IR-MCI (HNI : 43211) ===
0910-XXX-XXXX
0911-XXX-XXXX (mobile owner lives in Area 1)
0912-XXX-XXXX (mobile owner lives in Area 2)
0913-XXX-XXXX (mobile owner lives in Area 3)
0914-XXX-XXXX (mobile owner lives in Area 4)
0915-XXX-XXXX (mobile owner lives in Area 5)
0916-XXX-XXXX (mobile owner lives in Area 6)
0917-XXX-XXXX (mobile owner lives in Area 7)
0918-XXX-XXXX (mobile owner lives in Area 8)
0919-XXX-XXXX (mobile owner lives in Area 2)
0990-XXX-XXXX (pre-paid)
0991-XXX-XXXX
0992-XXX-XXXX (pre-paid)
0993-XXX-XXXX (pre-paid)
0994-XXX-XXXX (pre-paid and data SIM)
2nd digit after 091 is the code of mobile number. 09124XXXXXX is code4 or 09121XXXXXX is code 1. The lowest code has the highest price, meaning that the owner is (probably) wealthier.

==== Premium-rate telephone ====
Premium-rate telephone number for IR-MCI has this format : 9922-XXXX

only IR-MCI numbers can call these numbers

=== Espadan (HNI : 43219) ===
only in Isfahan province
0931-XXX-XXXX
pre-paid.

=== Iraphone (HNI : 43290) ===
only in Gheshm island

=== Taliya (HNI : 43232) ===
0932-XXX-XXXX

=== TeleKish (HNI : 43214) ===
0934-XXX-XXXX
post-paid

=== MTN Irancell (HNI : 43235) ===
0900-XXX-XXXX
0901-XXX-XXXX
0902-XXX-XXXX
0903-XXX-XXXX
0904-XXX-XXXX
0905-XXX-XXXX
0930-XXX-XXXX
0933-XXX-XXXX
0935-XXX-XXXX
0936-XXX-XXXX
0937-XXX-XXXX
0938-XXX-XXXX
0939-XXX-XXXX
pre-paid, post-paid and data SIM
0941-XXX-XXXX
(special for TD-LTE)

=== RighTel (HNI : 43220 & 43221) ===
0920-XXX-XXXX
post-paid
0921-XXX-XXXX
pre-paid & data SIM
0922-XXX-XXXX
pre-paid & data SIM
0923-XXX-XXXX
pre-paid & data SIM

=== MobinNet (HNI : 43240) ===
0955-XXX-XXXX
(special for TD-LTE)

== Mobile Virtual Network Operator (MVNO) ==
=== Shatel Mobile (HNI : 43208 & 43250) ===
0998-1XX-XXXX
pre-paid & data SIM

=== PH.Lotus ===
0999-0XX-XXXX
pre-paid

=== ApTel (NeginTel) (HNI : 43202) ===
0999-1XXX-XXX
post-paid

=== Avacell (HiWeb) (HNI : 43212) ===
0999-14XX-XXX
pre-paid

=== SamanTel (HNI : 43210) ===
0999-99X-XXXX
post-paid
0999-98X-XXXX
pre-paid & data SIM

=== Farabord Dadeh Haye Iranian Co. (Zi-Tel) (HNI : 43245) ===
0999-99X-XXXX
data SIM

=== Ertebatat-e Arian Tel Co. (Arian-Tel) (HNI : 43206) ===
0999-87X-XXXX
0999-88X-XXXX
0999-89X-XXXX

=== Ertebatat-e Farzanegan Pars (Wenex) (HNI : 43293) ===
data SIM

== Emergency numbers ==
The following numbers are used for emergency services within Iran

110 - Police

112 - Hilal Ahmar Ambulance (RED CRESENT)

115 - Ambulance

125 - Fire Department

911 - Redirected to 112 on mobile phones

== 2. Time, weather and information ==
=== 119 ===
Speaking clock (ساعت گویا)

=== 134 ===
Weather forecasts (هواشناسی)

=== 192 ===
Calendar and prayer times

=== 118 ===
Telephone directory assistance

=== 144 ===
Quran (iranians muslim book by allah) recitation service

=== 1000392 ===
World clock information by SMS

=== 1000305 ===
Weather information by SMS

== 3. Utilities and infrastructure ==
Number	Service
117	Landline telephone faults
121	Electricity emergency
122	Water and sewage emergency
194	Gas emergency
195	Telecommunications complaints
193	Postal services
20117	Landline fault reporting

== 4. Roads, transport and travel ==
Number	Service
133	Taxi service
141	Road conditions and traffic information
199	Airport information
09629	National travel information
51001	Imam Khomeini International Airport, Tehran
55121	Iranian Railways, Tehran
09697	Automobile and tourism assistance

Visit Iran+2

== 5. Government and public services ==
Number	Service
111	Presidential office
124	Consumer protection and price complaints
129	Judiciary information
136	General Inspection Organization
137	Municipal services (local)
138	Government communication
142	Social Security Organization
1480	Welfare counselling
162	IRIB public relations
167	Technical and vocational services
190	Ministry of Health complaints
191	24-hour pharmacy information
197	Police public oversight

== 6. Other useful services ==
Number	Service
09638	Cyber Police (FATA)
096440	Iran Khodro roadside assistance
096550	Saipa roadside assistance
1504	Natural resources protection
1540	Environmental protection
4030	Health and counselling information

== See also ==
- List of dialling codes in Iran
- Mobile Telecommunication Company of Iran
- MTN Irancell
- RighTel Communications
- Shatel
- Taliya Communications
- Telecommunication Company of Iran
