= JTG (disambiguation) =

JTG is an American professional wrestler (born 1984).

JTG may also refer to:

- Jet Time, a defunct Danish airline (ICAO code: JTG)
- John Thomas Griffith (born 1960), American singer-songwriter
- Jordan Telecom Group, a telephone company
- JTG Daugherty Racing, a NASCAR team
