= Valik =

تنهاکلا(غربی) تنهاکلا
- village
- Interactive map of تنهاکلا(غربی)
- Country: Iran
- Province: Mazandaran
- County: Babol
- Bakhsh: Bandpey-ye Sharqi
- Rural District: Sajjadrud
- Elevation: 150 m (490 ft)

Population (2006)
  - Total: 161
- Time zone: UTC+3:30 (IRST)
  - Summer (DST): UTC+4:30 (IRDT)

Tanhakola Gharbi (Persian: تنهاکلا(غربی), also Romanized as Tanhakola Gharbi) is a village in Sajjadrud Rural District, Bandpey-ye Sharqi District, Babol County, Mazandaran Province, Iran. At the 2006 census, its population was 161, in 43 families.

== Etymology ==
Tanhakola Gharbi is a native plant of Caspian Hyrcanian mixed forests. It gives small black fruits in autumn. Prior to settlement, the area where the village now lies was covered by dense forests of this tree.

== People ==
Most residents are farmers and cattle holders.

== Facility ==
The village has potable water, and is connected to the electric, gas and telephone network of Iran. Moreover, the area is in full coverage of mobile network of Iran (Hamrah-e-Aval, Irancell, Rightel).
