= 973 (disambiguation) =

973 is a year in the 10th century.

973 may also refer to:

- +973, the country calling code for Bahrain
- Area code 973, a telephone code for Northern New Jersey
- Program 973, China's National Basic Research Program
- France : departmental code for Guyane
