= Telecommunications in Yemen =

Telecommunications in Yemen provides information about the telephone, Internet, radio, and television infrastructure in Yemen.

== Infrastructure ==
Since unification in 1990, efforts have been made to create a national telecommunications network.

The infrastructure of the domestic system consists of microwave radio relay, cable, tropospheric scatter, GSM, and CDMA. Fixed-line and mobile-cellular teledensity remains low by regional standards.

The international network consists of three Intelsat (two Indian Ocean, and one Atlantic Ocean), one Intersputnik, and two Arabsat satellite earth stations, and a microwave radio relay to Saudi Arabia and Djibouti. Yemen is a landing point for the international submarine cable Fiber-Optic Link Around the Globe (FLAG).

In 2005 TeleYemen announced it would invest in the FALCON high-capacity loop cable system, which will improve Internet access, including broadband capability, and also expand international call accessibility.

== Radio and television ==
The state-run Republic of Yemen Television and Republic of Yemen Radio operate the country's television and radio networks, respectively. There are two state-run TV stations; two state-run national radio stations and five local stations; stations from Oman and Saudi Arabia can be accessed (2007).

== Internet usage ==
Yemen had 2.349 million Internet users in 2011, up from 295,232 in 2008, and 270,000 in 2006. These low numbers are attributed to the high cost of computer equipment and connections in combination with the population's low level of income, as well as to the restricted bandwidth available on Yemen's outdated telephone network. There were 33,206 Internet hosts in 2012.

There are five mobile service providers in Yemen.

The top-level domain for Yemen is .ye.

== Providers ==
TeleYemen is the exclusive provider of international telecommunications for Yemen—fixed-line and wireless mobile companies, telex, and Internet services—and is one of the mobile-phone operators. In 2003 the government-owned Public Telecommunications Corporation assumed full control of TeleYemen, and a year later it awarded a five-year management contract to France Telecom.

In 2001 two private companies won 15-year licenses to provide mobile phone services. The growth of the companies' networks has resulted in coverage of about 60 percent of the population, but threats to internal security coupled with poor consumer payment history remain obstacles to future growth. In August 2005, the government awarded a contract to a joint venture between China Mobile and a group of Yemeni investors to take a 55 percent stake in Yemen's third mobile network; the government will retain a 25 percent share. In August 2006, the same conglomerate was awarded a contract for a fourth mobile network. The four mobile network providers currently present in the mobile phone market are Yemeni Omani United (YOU, previously MTN Yemen), Sabafon, Yemen Mobile,Yemen 4G, and Y (Y Telecom).

== Mobile service provider ==
• Yemen Mobile – The largest carrier in the country by subscriber count, managing over 14 million users. It is a public shareholding company that originally launched as a CDMA2000 network and was the first provider to roll out 4G LTE services.

• Yemeni Omani United (YOU) – Formerly known as MTN Yemen (and Spacetel prior to that). In late 2021, the MTN Group exited the Yemeni market and transferred its shares to Emerald International Investment, leading to its rebranding as YOU. It operates a dominant GSM and 4G LTE network.

• Sabafon – Launched in February 2001, Sabafon is a private company that holds the distinction of being the first GSM network operator in Yemen.

• Y Telecom (Y Co) – Established as the third GSM private network operator in Yemen to compete alongside Sabafon and the former MTN network.

• Yemen 4G – established as a nationwide fixed wireless broadband project, officially launched in September 2022 by the Public Telecommunications Corporation in Sana'a. It provides high-speed wireless broadband to individuals, financial sectors, and businesses using Long-Term Evolution (LTE) infrastructure across multiple frequency bands.

Rank	Operator	Technology	Subscribers (in millions)	Ownership
1	Yemeni Omani United (YOU)	GSM; 4G (LTE)	4.7 (November 2021)	Emerald International Investment LCC (82.8%)
2	Sabafon	GSM; 4G (LTE)	3.0 (December 2008)	Yemen Mobile Phone Company, Batelco (26.942%)
3	Yemen Mobile	CDMA2000/1x; 4G (LTE)	6 (2008-2009)	Yemen Mobile
4	Y-Telecom (Y)	GSM	1 (2008-2009)	Y-Telecom
5	Yemen 4G يمن فورجي	LTE; 4G (LTE)		المؤسسة العامة للاتصالات السلكية واللاسلكية
=== YEMEN 4G === In September 2022, the Public Telecommunications Corporation officially inaugurated "YEMEN 4G," a nationwide fixed wireless broadband internet service. The infrastructure transmits data across multiple Long-Term Evolution (LTE) frequency spectrums to balance urban network capacity and wide-area coverage: FDD-LTE Band 3 (1800 MHz) & Band 20 (800 MHz): Utilized to handle baseline network traffic and primary city coverage.; FDD-LTE Band 28 (700 MHz): Deployed to maximize deep indoor signal penetration and long-distance rural connectivity.; TDD-LTE Band 41 (2500 MHz): Allocated to support high-density broadband capacity and fast download links over time-division duplex channels.

== See also ==
- Media of Yemen
- Internet in Yemen
- Y-Telecom, GSM provider in Yemen.
- Sabafon, GSM provider in Yemen.
- Yemeni Omani United (YOU - formerly MTN), GSM provider in Yemen, previously known as Spacetel and currently known as YOU.
- Yemen Mobile, CDMA,LTE provider in Yemen.
