= Hamala, Bahrain =

Hamala الهملة
- Village
- Location within Bahrain
- Coordinates: 26°08′59″N 50°27′55″E
- Country: Bahrain

Population
  - Estimate: 18,000
- Time zone: UTC+3 (Bahrain Standard Time)

Hamala (Arabic: الهملة) is a village located in the Kingdom of Bahrain, an island country in the Persian Gulf.

Batelco, Bahrain's largest telecommunications company, has its headquarters based in Hamala.
