= .bh =

Top-level Internet domain for Bahrain

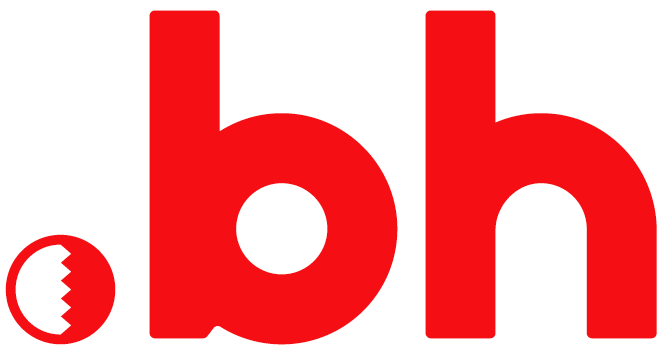
- Introduced: 1 February 1994
- TLD type: Country code top-level domain
- Status: Active
- Registry: .BH Domain Registry
- Sponsor: Telecommunications Regulatory Authority of Bahrain
- Intended use: Entities connected with Bahrain
- Actual use: Gets some use in Bahrain; registrations are offered by local and international registrars.
- Registration restrictions: Domains under second level are open for international registration since May 2022 while all third level domain names require local presence and local trade licences.
- Structure: Registrations are available directly at the second level, or at third level beneath some second-level labels
- Documents: Registration rules
- Dispute policies: Policies
- Registry website: domains.bh register.bh

.البحرين
- TLD type: Internationalized country code top-level domain
- Status: Approved (in 2019)
- Registry: .BH Domain Registry
- Sponsor: Telecommunications Regulatory Authority of Bahrain
- Intended use: Entities connected with Bahrain in the Arabic script
- Registration restrictions: Open for international registration since May 2022

.bh is the Internet country code top-level domain (ccTLD) for Bahrain. It is administered by the Telecommunications Regulatory Authority of Bahrain (TRA).

== History ==
The .bh domain was first delegated in 1994 to the University of Bahrain Computer Center. In 1999, the domain was delegated to the Bahrain Telecommunications Company, which since remains the sponsoring organisation.

In 2002, the Telecommunications Regulatory Authority was established, and in 2008, the Minister of Telecommunications of Bahrain assigned TRA as the governmental agency responsible for the management of the .bh top-level domain.

On 6 December 2011, the Telecommunication Regulatory Authority commenced a request to ICANN for redelegation of the ".BH" top-level domain. In March 2012, this request was completed.

== Structure ==
Registration directly at second level is available internationally, while all registrations under the second level domain names listed below, require a local presence and relevant local licences.

List of second level domains
Second level domain	Intended purpose
.com.bh	Businesses (individuals also allowed)
.cc.bh	Businesses
.biz.bh	Businesses
.net.bh	Telecommunications and IT services providers (natural persons also allowed)
.edu.bh	Educational institutions
.info.bh	Information provision services
.med.bh	Medical services
.name.bh	Natural persons
.me.bh	Natural persons
