= West Asian Billiards & Snooker Federation =

West Asian Billiards and Snooker Federation
- Formation: 2 June 2010
- Type: Sports organization
- Headquarters: Riyadh, Saudi Arabia
- Members: 13 member associations
- President: (Saudi Arabia) Hassan Mohammed Abu Ish
- Website: http://www.wabsf.net/en/index.php

The West Asian Billiard and Snooker Federation abbreviated as WABSF, founded in 2010, is an association of the billiard and snooker playing nations in West Asia. Its founding members and competing nations are 13 West Asian nations, namely Saudi Arabia, Bahrain, Iraq, Iran, Lebanon, Syria, Oman, Jordan, Palestine, Qatar, Kuwait, UAE, and Yemen.

They organize the West Asian Championship for Billiard Sports annually, alongside other occasional tournaments.

== Member Associations ==
WABSF has 13 member associations. All of them are members of the Asian Billiard Confederation.

Association	Joining year	Nation
Bahrain	2010	Bahrain
Iraq	2010	Iraq
Iran	2010	Iran
Lebanon	2010	Lebanon
Jordan	2010	Jordan
Kuwait	2010	Kuwait
Oman	2010	Oman
Palestine	2010	Palestine
Qatar	2010	Qatar
Saudi Arabia	2010	Saudi Arabia
Syria	2010	Syria
United Arab Emirates	2010	United Arab Emirates
Yemen	2010	Yemen

== Events ==
WABSF runs the West Asian Billiard and Snooker Championship annually, of which these listed are the editions;

West Asian Billiard and Snooker Championship:

#	Host	Year
1	Saudi Arabia	2011
2	United Arab Emirates	2012
-	not held	2013
3	Qatar	2014
4	United Arab Emirates	2015
5		2016
6		2017
7		2018
8		2019
-	not held	2020
-	not held	2021
9	Bahrain	2022
10		2023
11	Bahrain	2024
12	Saudi Arabia	2025
13	Iran	2026

== Presidents ==
President	Years
(Saudi Arabia) Hassan Mohammed Abu Ish	2010 -
