= Orange Jordan =

Telecommunication company in Jordan

- Company type: Limited company
- Industry: Telecommunications
- Founded: 1999
- Headquarters: Amman, Jordan
- Products: Landline, Mobile, Internet
- Revenue: JOD 324.4 Million (2018)
- Operating income: JOD104 Million (2018)
- Net income: JOD21.3 Million (2018)
- Total assets: JOD 624.3 Million (2018)
- Number of employees: 136,000 (2023)
- Parent: Jordan Telecom Group
- Website: www.orange.jo

Orange Jordan (formerly MobileCom) is a Jordanian public mobile telephone network operator, and is the operator of the mobile communications license granted to Jordan Telecom.

The company was first registered on 21 September 1999, with an aim to build a mobile communications network to serve Jordan, and has launched full public service across the Kingdom on 15 September 2000.

The mobile operator was called MobileCom until it was rebranded in 2007.

== History ==
Upon privatization on 23 January 2000, Jordan Telecom Group was 60% owned by Jordan's government. The remaining 40% of the group's shares were owned by JITCO Investment Group, a holding company consisting of France Télécom (88%) and the Arab Bank (12%).

== Mobile ==
On 30 March 2010, Orange Jordan launched its 3G network – The first 3G network in Jordan. The W-CDMA network was rolled out in three phases, according to Orange Jordan's Ex-CEO Nayla Khawam. Under the first phase roll out included west Amman, Irbid and Zarqa, while in April coverage was expanded to cover the entire capital and Aqaba. By summer 2010 network coverage included most urban locations, delivering services to approximately 70% of populated areas, equivalent to around two million people.

== Fixed broadband ==
In 2009, Orange Jordan offered higher ADSL speeds to its Jordanian customers reaching 4Mbps and 8Mbps. In line with Orange Jordan's strategy to make 2011 the "Year of Broadband," the company unveiled in February 2011 its new ADSL2+ and 3G+ package, offering unprecedented broadband speeds of up to 24Mbps and 21Mbps respectively. The company later expended its "home internet" offering with fiber and 5G.

== See also ==
- Zain Jordan
- Umniah
- List of mobile network operators of the Middle East and Africa
