= West Asian Tennis Federation =

West Asia Tennis Federation
- Abbreviation: WATF
- Type: Regional sports federation
- Region served: West Asia
- Members: 7 national federations
- Parent organization: Asian Tennis Federation
- Website: WATF

The West Asian Tennis Federation (WATF) also known as ITF West Asia (International Tennis Federation West Asia) is a subzone of the ATF consisting of countries from West Asia.

== Member nations ==
- Bahrain
- Jordan
- Iran
- Iraq
- Lebanon
- Syria
- Palestine
- Kuwait
- Qatar
- Saudi Arabia
- United Arab Emirates
- Oman
- Yemen
