= Moutiny =

Moutiny is a telecommunications company providing mobile telephony and wireless internet services in Iraq.

The company was "staffed by Iraqis, many of whom have returned to Iraq to work on the network".

== See also ==
- Zain Iraq
- AsiaCell
- Iraqna
- Korek
- Telephone numbers in Iraq
