= Telecommunications Regulatory Authority of Bahrain =

Bahrain telecoms regulator

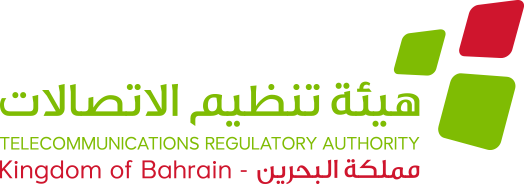

Agency overview
- Jurisdiction: Bahrain
- Parent department: Government of Bahrain
- Website: www.tra.org.bh

The Telecommunications Regulatory Authority of Bahrain (TRA) is the official, independent body recognized by the Government of Bahrain for regulating the telecoms sector in Bahrain.

TRA presides over licensing, regulation, policy making, consumer protection, and technical operations. TRA was established in 2002, following the promulgation of the Telecoms Law, as stated in Legislative Decree No. 48 of 2002.

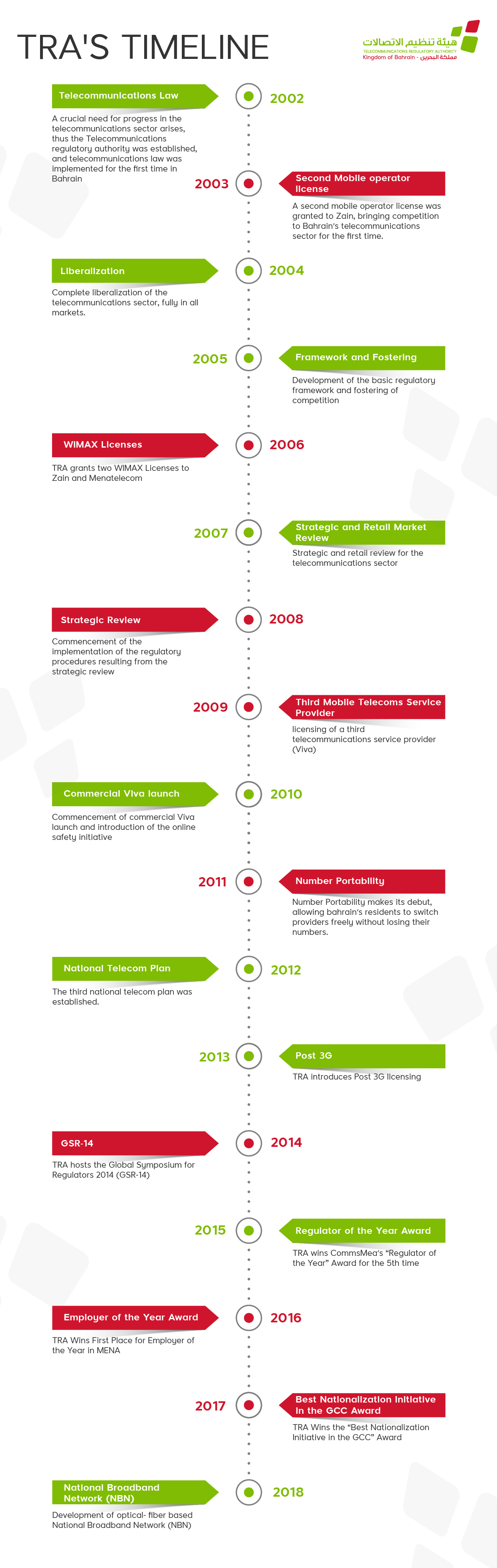
TRA Bahrain's historical timeline

== Activities ==
=== Mobile, fixed line and broadband regulation ===
TRA regulates mobile phone, fixed-line phone, and broadband providers. TRA carries out this activity through legal instruments that stem from the Telecommunications Law of Bahrain, which was promulgated on October 23, 2002 as Legislative Decree No. 48. When devising measures that will have a material effect on a particular telecommunications market, TRA offers interested parties an opportunity to give their opinions within a reasonable period. This is carried out in the form of public consultations, which it publishes and announces. Consultations may lead to position papers, guidelines, decisions and/or determinations. TRA also uses orders, such as emergency orders where the TRA demands an operator take a particular action to correct anti-competitive activity, or an enforcement order to correct a breach of the Telecommunications Law, or Access Orders to impose access obligations on an operator who has ceased offering a particular service.

=== Market research ===
TRA performs market research as part of its operations. These come in the form of activities including:

- Annual and quarterly market indicator reports that update telecoms market information and analysis
- Market surveys that offer insight into consumer satisfaction levels and identify problem areas
- Price Benchmarking studies and reports that shed light on price levels of different telecoms services compared to other markets, and the impact of price changes on consumers
- Quality of Service reports that monitor telecom service levels

=== Technical operations ===
==== Licensing ====
Article 24 of the Law requires that an operator of a Public Telecommunications network requires a License. Individual or Class Licenses are available. TRA's Licensing Department is responsible for granting licenses and ensuring compliance with applicable license conditions. In addition, a Frequency License may also be required by an operator if the service to be provided requires the use of radio frequencies as required by Article 43. Equipment that is covered by an operator’s Frequency License is exempt, as is the case for the three mobile operators Batelco, Zain and Viva and the National Fixed and National Fixed Wireless Service operators Bahrain Broadband (Greenisis), Mena Telecom and Zain. This is not the case e.g. for wireless routers and devices in personal computers which connect to such routers. Since exemption from frequency licensing is not permitted by Law in the Kingdom, it is necessary for users of such devices to apply for a no-charge, on-line ‘light license’.

==== Type approval ====
All telecommunications apparatus that connects directly to a Public Telecommunications Network and/or which is an intentional transmitter of radio waves are subject to the TRA's Type Approval requirements. Such equipment with a transmitter is referred to collectively as Radio and Telecommunications Terminal Equipment (RTTE). Local manufacturers, authorized importers, and licensed operators are the parties that are eligible to apply for equipment registration of RTTE.

==== Numbering and number portability ====
One of the roles assigned to the TRA is to prepare and maintain a National Numbering Plan (the “Plan”) and allocate numbers to operators in accordance with that Plan. The licenses issued to the operators require that they maintain their own individual numbering plans and provide an annual numbering report to the Authority in compliance with the National Plan. This Plan provides a scheme for the national telecommunications infrastructure, so that competing operators can configure their networks with confidence. The Plan is applicable to all appropriately licensed telecommunications operators wishing to make use of the national resource of numbers. The Plan and its processes and strictures are mandatory on all such operators.

==== Consumer Affairs ====
TRA's Consumer Affairs unit has the two-pronged purpose of protecting consumers and raising awareness levels.

- Consumer Protection: Based on TRA's Consumer Protection Regulation, TRA protects consumers from breaches in advertising and other products or services. The Consumer Affairs Department investigates these breaches by providing consumers multiple channels to approach them to submit disputes. This includes a toll-free hotline, an online consumer portal and email.
- Consumer Awareness: The TRA believes that educating consumers with respect to their rights and obligations is vital.

== See also ==
- List of telecommunications regulatory bodies
