= .ye =

Internet country code top-level domain for Yemen

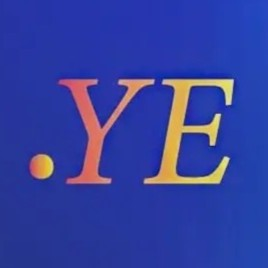
- Introduced: 19 August 1996
- TLD type: Country code top-level domain
- Status: Active
- Registry: YemenNet
- Sponsor: TeleYemen
- Intended use: Entities connected with Yemen
- Actual use: Gets some use in Yemen
- Structure: Registrations are made at third level beneath several second-level names
- Registry website: TeleYemen

.ye is the Internet country code top-level domain (ccTLD) for the Republic of Yemen.

== History ==
In 2015, when the Houthis took over the Yemeni capital, the rebel forces also took over the main internet provider and distributor of the .ye domain, TeleYemen, which remains under their control. According to DomainTools, 1152 .ye domain names were registered as of 2018.

== Regulations ==
In order to register a .ye domain, one must have a company registered in Yemen. However, some registrars provide a local presence service for non-Yemeni clients. Domain names also need to be hosted in the Republic of Yemen.

== Second-level domains ==
There are eight second-level domains:

- com.ye: Commercial Entities
- co.ye: Companies
- ltd.ye: Limited Companies
- me.ye: Private Individuals
- net.ye: Network Providers
- org.ye: Non-commercial Organizations
- plc.ye: Public Companies
- gov.ye: Government and Governmental Systems

== Internationalized domain ==
An internationalized country code top-level domain has been planned for the Republic of Yemen, intended for domain names in the local Arabic language. The string اليمن (al-Yaman) was registered and approved for this purpose in March 2011, but it was not activated and lower level domains were not granted at that time.

== See also ==
- Telecommunications in Yemen
- Telephone numbers in Yemen
