= Mobile Telecommunications Company of Esfahan =

Mobile network operator in Iran

Mobile Telecommunication Company of Esfahan (شرکت مخابرات سیار اصفهان, Shirkat-e Mixabrat-e Siyar-e Esfehan, MTCE) also known as Espadan was a mobile network operator in Iran.

Following the agreements reached during the Iranian President Hashemi Rafsanjani's visit to Malaysia in 1994, and according to the laws of attracting and supporting foreign investment, on 29 May 2001 the license for launching the first prepaid mobile telephone network in Iran with an initial capacity of 20 thousand subscribers was granted to Celcom for 15 years, and the Malaysian Technology Resources Industry Company received permission to use GSM 24.18 Mbit/s bandwidth within the Isfahan province.

In 2005 Celcom sold its stakes to TM International(Telekom Malaysia).

In 2008 MTCE bought the WiMAX license from Iranian Communications Regulatory Authority (CRA).

In 2011 MTCE went broke and deactivated all SIM cards following merger with Mobile Telecommunications Company of Iran.

== Sim cards ==
Sim cards numbers had 0931 as prefix.

== Shareholders ==
Axiata Group Berhad (49%) | Telecommunications Company of Esfahan (49%) | Iran Telecom Industries (2%)
