= Yemeni Omani United =

Mobile network operator in Yemen

- Logo as of 2022
- Trade name: YOU
- Native name: الشركة اليمنية العمانية المتحدة للاتصالات
- Formerly: Spacetel Yemen (2000-2006); MTN Yemen (2006-2022)
- Type: Private
- Industry: Telecommunications
- Founded: September 2000; 25 years ago in Sanaa, Yemen (as Spacetel Yemen)
- Headquarters: Sanaa, Yemen
- Area served: Yemen
- Key people: Abdullah Al Balushi (chairman); Abdullah Al-Shahari (acting deputy CEO); Ibrahim Al-Samhi (Executive Director of the Marketing Division)
- Owner: Investcom LLC (2000-2006); MTN Group (82.8%) (2006-2021); Emerald International Investment LLC (82.8%) (2021-present)
- Website: you.com.ye

Yemeni Omani United (Arabic: الشركة العمانية اليمنية للاتصالات), trading as YOU (formerly MTN Yemen) is a mobile network operator in Yemen. It was established in September 2000 as a local and international joint-stock company and became the second GSM service provider in Yemen (Note: with the first one being Sabafon) under the trade name Spacetel Yemen, which was part of Investcom LLC. In July 2006, MTN Group acquired Investcom LLC, resulting in the rebranding of Spacetel Yemen to MTN Yemen. In 2021, MTN Group announced its exit from the Yemeni market and transferred its majority shareholding to Emerald International Investment LLC, which rebranded MTN Yemen to Yemeni Omani United (YOU) in 2022.

== History ==
=== As Spacetel Yemen ===
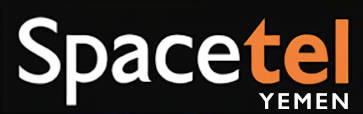
Logo of Spacetel Yemen

The company launched its local mobile service in February 2001, which is after the company was established by months. Before its establishment in September 2000, Spacetel Yemen paid $10 million for its 15-year 900 MHz concession in July 2000.

According to the marketing manager of Spacetel at the time, the company's network covered up to 80% of the population in 2004.

In 2005, Spacetel Yemen signed a contract worth $20 million with Alcatel Mobile to expand and update its network.

=== As MTN Yemen ===
Logo used by MTN Yemen

After completing its rebranding in 2007, MTN Yemen acquired additional frequencies in the 1800 MHz band in February 2008.

=== As YOU ===
After its rebranding to YOU in March 2022, the company began providing 4G (LTE) as part of its services. This came as 4G infrastructure was introduced to Yemen in September of that year.

The government in Aden contested the handover of shares from MTN Group to Emerald International Investment LLC, denouncing it as illegal and alleging that Ansar Allah (Houthis) had seized control of the company under the guise of "foreign investors". Consequently, a decree was issued to prohibit the company from functioning in territories under Aden's control, particularly in the city itself and the other southern governorates.

The company reassured its customers in the Southern governorates that their numbers, balances, and subscriptions were safe, and that it took the matter to court. On this matter, the chairman of the company, Abdullah Al Balushi, said "If we did not believe that our legal position was correct, we would not have resorted to the judiciary. However, we are confident in the legality of the company and the soundness of its transfer procedures, and we have sufficient documentation to confirm this." he continued "The procedures for the replacement and sale of shares in closed joint-stock companies in Yemen are well-known. Nevertheless, we ensured that the change was announced and that all concerned parties were notified of the new situation."

The company along with Yemen Mobile has been accused by SMEX of selling customers' active phone numbers to new ones, rendering the original owners unable to use their numbers completely.

== Rebranding and ownership ==
Before its current rebranding, the company operated as MTN Yemen. After MTN Group acquired Investcom LLC for $5.5 billion in 2006, the company's name changed from Spacetel to MTN Yemen. MTN Group held a majority stake in the company from 2006 to 2021. In 2021, MTN Group exited the Yemeni market, transferring its 82.3% stake to Emerald International Investment LLC, (Note: Which is an Omani company, hence why the current name includes "Omani") a subsidiary of Zubair Investment Center LLC, which had previously held a minority stake in MTN Yemen.

MTN's exit from Yemen was part of a broader strategy to withdraw from the Middle East, citing profitability concerns, since Yemen contributed only 0.3% to the group EBITDA. MTN says that it aims to focus solely on providing services in Africa.

== See also ==
- Telecommunications in Yemen
- Internet in Yemen
- Y-Telecom واي للاتصالات, GSM provider in Yemen.
- Sabafon, GSM provider in Yemen.
- Yemeni Omani United (YOU - formerly MTN), GSM provider in Yemen, previously known as Spacetel and currently known as YOU.
- Yemen Mobile, CDMA,LTE provider in Yemen.
- Yemen 4G (Public Telecommunications Corporation) (MCC 421 / MNC 10) LTE: Band 3 (1800 MHz), Band 20 (800 MHz), Band 28 (700 MHz), and Band 41 (2500 MHz TDD)
