= Telecommunications in Bahrain =

Telecommunications in Bahrain are provided by the Bahrain Telecommunications Company, trading as Batelco, as well as other companies such as Zain and STC.

Prior to 1981 telecommunications services were provided by two separate departments: national services were provided by the Bahrain Telephone Company and international services by Cable & Wireless of the United Kingdom. These were combined in 1981 to form Batelco. Since then, other telecommunications companies have entered the market.

== History ==
When Batelco was founded in 1981, Bahrain had 45,627 telephone lines in use. By 1982, the number reached 50,000. In 1985, the country's first fibre optic cable was installed. Batelco was a monopoly in the telecommunications sector until 2003. By 1999, the company had around 100,000 mobile contracts.

In 2002, under pressure from international bodies, Bahrain implemented its telecommunications law which included the establishment of an independent Telecommunications Regulatory Authority (TRA). In 2003, Batelco's monopoly over the sector ended when the TRA awarded a licence to MTC Vodafone, which later re-branded itself as Zain. In January 2010, Viva Bahrain, which later re-branded into STC Bahrain (a subsidiary of STC) started operations in Bahrain.

== Telephonic services ==
In 2006, there were 194,200 telephone main lines in Bahrain.

country comparison to the world: 124

In 2007, there were 1,116,000 mobile cellular contracts in Bahrain.

country comparison to the world: 132

Telephone system:

- general assessment: modern system
- domestic: modern fiber-optic integrated services; digital network with rapidly growing use of mobile cellular telephones
- international: country code - 973; landing point for the Fiber-Optic Link Around the Globe (FLAG) submarine cable network that provides links to Asia, Middle East, Europe, and US; tropospheric scatter to Qatar and UAE; microwave radio relay to Saudi Arabia; satellite earth station - 1 (2007)

== Broadcast radio ==
Radio broadcast stations: AM 2, FM 3, shortwave 0 (1998)

== Broadcast television ==
Television broadcast stations: 4 (1997)

== Internet service ==
Internet country code: .bh

Internet hosts: 2,621 (2008)

country comparison to the world: 135

Internet users: 250,000 (2007)

country comparison to the world: 124

== See also ==
- Bahrain
