= Taliya Communications =

Taliya
- Type: Private
- Industry: communication
- Founded: February 17, 2004
- Headquarters: Tehran, Iran
- Products: 0932: Prepaid Sim Cards
- Website: https://www.taliya.ir

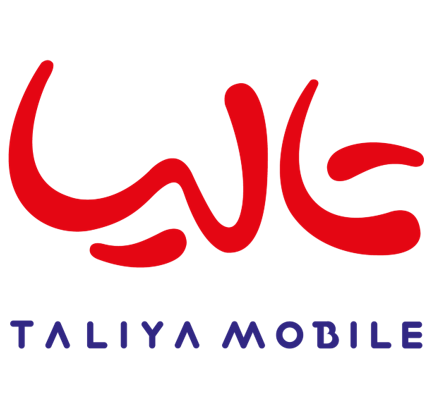
Taliya mobile logo

Taliya established in 2004 is the first independent privately held pre-paid mobile network operator in Iran.

== History of Taliya ==
Using software and hardware technologies produced by Siemens, Alcatel and Ericsson as well as a consultant namely Tele2, Taliya started its activity in February 2004 as the first pre-paid cell phones independent network.

== Taliya Mobile activity as a virtual operator ==
Since 2017, with the change in the structure and type of activity of Taliya Mobile, this mobile operator continues to activate as a second-type virtual operator. Currently, Taliya activate as a Light MVNO operator and provides its services on the MCI network. Taliya supports different generations of telecommunication networks such as 2G, 3G ,4G, 4.5G and 5G.

== Taliya Mobile 0932 Pre-paid Simcards ==
Taliya Company has been operating in Iran since 2004 by providing Pre-paid SIM cards. Taliya SIM cards with reasonable call rates and internet packages are suitable for foreign tourists. This mobile operator has nationwide coverage throughout Iran.

Talyia line numbers start with 0932.

== Services ==
Taliya is the first provider of pre-paid SIM Cards in Iran. The Facilities of Taliya SIM cards include making calls, sending, and receiving short messages and mobile data.

== Taliya charge ==
All Talyia subscribers can recharge and purchase internet packages via the website https://echarge.taliya.ir or via a command codes *932# and *500# .

== Electronic charge cards ==
To facilitate access to Taliya credits, Taliya provides electronic pre-paid charges, which are readily accessible via bank and Credit Institutions' ATMs, POS, Web Kiosks, Websites and Vending Machines.
