= Jordan Telecom Group =

Telecommunication company in Jordan

- Company type: Public company
- Traded as: ASE: JTEL
- Industry: Telecommunications
- Founded: 1 January 1997
- Headquarters: Amman, Jordan
- Key people: Philippe Mansour (CEO); Mohammad Abu AlGhanam (CFO); Waleed Al-Doulat (Chief information technology and networks officer)
- Products: Telecommunications services Internet services
- Revenue: ▲JOD 324.4 million (2018)
- Number of employees: 1,246 (2025)
- Website: www.orange.jo

Jordan Telecom Group is the principal telecommunications services provider in the Kingdom of Jordan. Jordan Telecom is responsible for the administration of the basic telecommunications infrastructure which forms the base of Jordan's telecommunications services industry.

Upon privatization on 23 January 2000, Jordan Telecom Group was 60% owned by Jordan's government. The remaining 40% of the group's shares were owned by JITCO Investment Group, a holding company consisting of Orange (88%) and the Arab Bank (12%).

The Jordan Telecom Group (JTG) owns the following telecommunications companies:

- Jordan Telecom
- Orange Jordan
- eDimension

As of 2025, Jordan Telecom Group employed approximately 1,246 people.

== Jordan Telecom ==
Jordan Telecom

Jordan Telecom is a privatized telephone company, founded in 1971 and now belonging to the Jordan Telecom Group. It holds the telecom license, but the mobile component is managed by Orange Jordan.

== History ==
The history of telecommunications in Jordan can be traced back to early 1921. After the foundation of the Hashemite Kingdom of Jordan, the Ministry of Post, Telegraph and Telephony was established which further developed the country's Telecommunications Services. In 1961, the first automatic telephone switch service was introduced utilizing an electromechanical switch with a capacity of approximately 5000 lines. In 1971, a new government-controlled body, the Telecommunications Corporation (T.C.C) was set up to take over the day-to-day running of the communications services such as telephone, telegraph and telex. Also a satellite earth station at Baqa'a was in operation using Intelsat facilities. From 1973 to 1985, Jordan Telecom's network underwent significant expansion as part of a government investment program. In 1993 the government was able to initiate a development program known as the National Telecommunications Program (NTP).
