= Rightel =

Iranian mobile phone network operator

RighTel
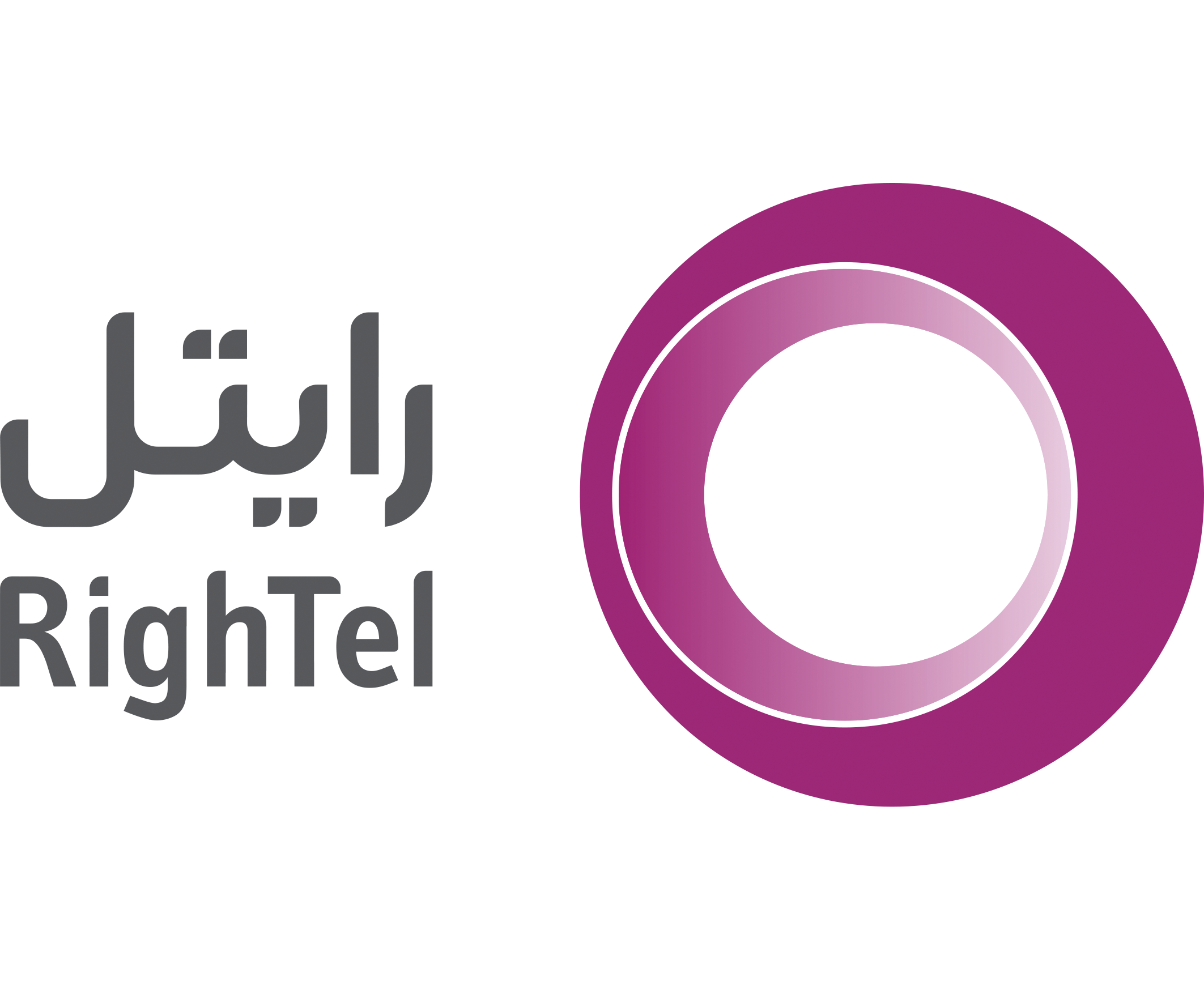
- Type: Semi Private
- Industry: Mobile network operator
- Founded: 2011
- Headquarters: Tehran, Iran
- Key people: ... (Chairman and CEO)
- Products: Internet, SMS, MMS, Voice, and Video Call
- Number of employees: 1000+
- Website: RighTel

RighTel (Persian: رایتل) is the third mobile phone network operator of Iran. RighTel is the first 3G mobile operator in Iran, providing 3.75G mobile telecommunication services to individuals and businesses.

Rightel's dedicated 4G network is active in the cities of Tehran, Tabriz, Isfahan, Shiraz, Mashhad, Ahvaz, Karaj, and Gorgan, and in the rest of the cities and villages of the country, subscribers can connect to the host operator (MCI or MTN Irancell) by manual or automatic search.

Established by the Social Security Organization, in late 2011 and started its expansion and launch of services in 2012. RighTel is fully owned by the investment company of the Social Security Organization. RighTel has approximately 5 percent of the mobile subscribers in Iran and has covered the whole country mostly with 3G technology by 2017 but struggled ever since to increase its market share beyond that and expand its 4G LTE coverage.

In 2016, after withdrawing sanctions, RightTel associated with AT&T to provide roaming services to owners of American phones inside Iran.

== See also ==
- MTN Irancell
- Communications in Iran
