= Yemen Mobile =

Mobile network operator in Yemen

- Yemen Mobile logo
- Company type: Private
- Industry: Telecommunications
- Founded: 2004
- Headquarters: Yemen
- Products: Mobile service provider
- Website: www.yemenmobile.com.ye

Yemen Mobile is a CDMA2000 network provider founded in Yemen in 2004 and it is the first CDMA network operator in the Middle East. Yemen Mobile CDMA system is based on Huawei equipment. According to the 3GPP2 standard, CDMA2000 system is fully compatible with IS-95 cellular phones, so any IS-95 phone will work with Yemen mobile. In 2012, Yemen mobile implemented ZTE equipment besides Huawei as well as using LG-Nortel network in some eastern parts of the country. Yemen Mobile is the first 3G company in Yemen that provides CDMA2000 1x and 1xEV-DO services. Yemen mobile was established in 2004 as a third wireless operator in Yemen and initially provided voice services alongside data services which enable their customers to use data and the Internet at a speed of 153 kbit/s by implementing the CDMA2000 1xRTT standard. By 2007, it had jumped to the top of mobile operators in the country in term of subscribers number and coverage.

Beginning in January 2021, Yemen Mobile became the first mobile network operator in Yemen to provide 4G LTE internet. In the end of 2022 Yemen mobile became the biggest telecom company according to the number of subscribers in Yemen. It had 14 million subscriber in total.

== See also ==
- Y-Telecom, GSM provider in Yemen.
- Sabafon, GSM provider in Yemen.
- Yemeni Omani United (YOU - formerly MTN), GSM provider in Yemen, previously known as Spacetel and currently known as YOU.
- [Yemen 4G], LTE provider in Yemen, known as TeleYemen (Yemeni International Telecommunications Company) is the exclusive licensed provider of international telecommunications and satellite communications services in Yemen. A fully state-owned entity under the Ministry of Telecommunications, it manages the country's international gateways, connects corporate customers, and facilitates satellite communications (including Thuraya).
