= Sabafon =

Telecommunication company in Yemen

The Yemen Company for Mobile Telephony
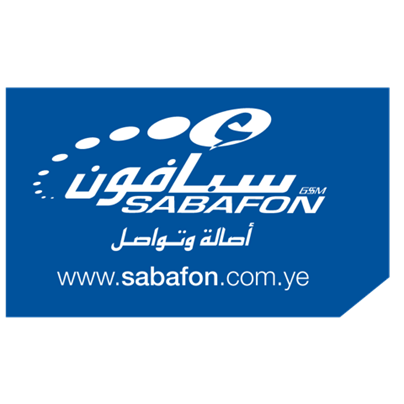
- Trade name: SabaFon
- Native name: سبأفون
- Company type: Private
- Industry: Telecommunications
- Founded: February 14, 2001; 25 years ago in Sana'a, Yemen
- Area served: Yemen
- Services: Mobile network operator
- Website: sabafon.com and sabafon.com.ye

The Yemen Company for Mobile Telephony, known by its trade name Sabafon, is a Yemeni telecommunications company that was the first GSM Network operator in Yemen, launched in February 2001. The company claims to have set up the largest GSM cellular network, which covers most of Yemen's area. The slogan of the company is "أصالة وتواصل", (pronounced: Asalah wa tawasul) meaning, "Authenticity and communication".

== Management ==
The company organization is (chairman), (CEO), Ahmed Barashed (HR), Mohammed Kamal (Technical Director), Pier Imad (Sales Director), and Walid Akkaoui (marketing Director), Ali Naji (CFO), Iskander Saeed (IT Director).

== Shareholders ==
SabaFon consists of seven shareholders:

Shareholder	% stake
Al-Ahmar Group for Trading, Industrial & General Agencies	44.444
Batelco	29.937
Ali Ali Maqsaa	11.111
Hayel Saeed Anam & Co.	7.778
Consolidated Contractors Company S.A.L. (CCC)	5.556
Kahlan Mujahed Abushawareb	1.111
Hamdan Abdullah Hussein Al-Ahmar (Chairman of SabaFon)	0.063

=== Al-Ahmar Group ===
A holding entity possessing numerous companies in various fields of business activities in Yemen. Their companies include banking, oil, telecommunications, fishing, airlines, clothing, and food and beverages.

Key Personnel: Hamid Al-Ahmar - Chairman of the Board

=== Batelco ===
Batelco is Bahrain's main telecommunication company. Serving both the corporate and consumer markets in the Middle East, Batelco sells telecommunications in Bahrain and MENA.

With operations in Bahrain, Jordan, Kuwait, and Egypt, the Batelco Group provides voice and data services over fixed, wireless, and internet platforms, systems integration and enterprise solutions to Government and Corporate clients.

=== Hayel Saeed Anam & Co. Ltd. ===
Hayel Saeed Anam & Co. Ltd. is A local group, which provides a variety of services through their Industrial, Commercial, Agriculture, Fishery, Animal wealth, Hotels, Health, Banks, and Insurance Companies.

=== Consolidated Constructors International company S.A.L. (CCC) ===
An international construction company, CCC has multiple infrastructure investments in Yemen and around the world.

== Network infrastructure ==
The company claims that it covers all major cities, towns, major highways, and remote areas of Yemen, and will continue its efforts to roll out into new places and regions in Yemen. The Existing Network includes:

- Switches: Siemens (EWSD) Version SR9
- Radio Base station: Siemens Motorola
- Billing System: Protek
- Microwave Equipment: Siemens Nokia
- Operating frequency: 900 MHz

The planned network (2008 Plan) includes:

- Switches: Siemens, NSN
- Radio Base station: Siemens NSN Huawei
- Billing System: Protek
- Microwave Equipment: Siemens Nokia
- Operating frequency: 900 MHz, 1800 MHz

== See also ==
- Yemen Mobile
- Telecommunications in Yemen
- Y Telecom ar:واي للاتصالات
- You Yemeni Omani United
- Yemen 4G ar:الاتصالات في اليمن
