= Batelco =

Telecommunications company in Bahrain

Bahrain Telecommunication Company BSC

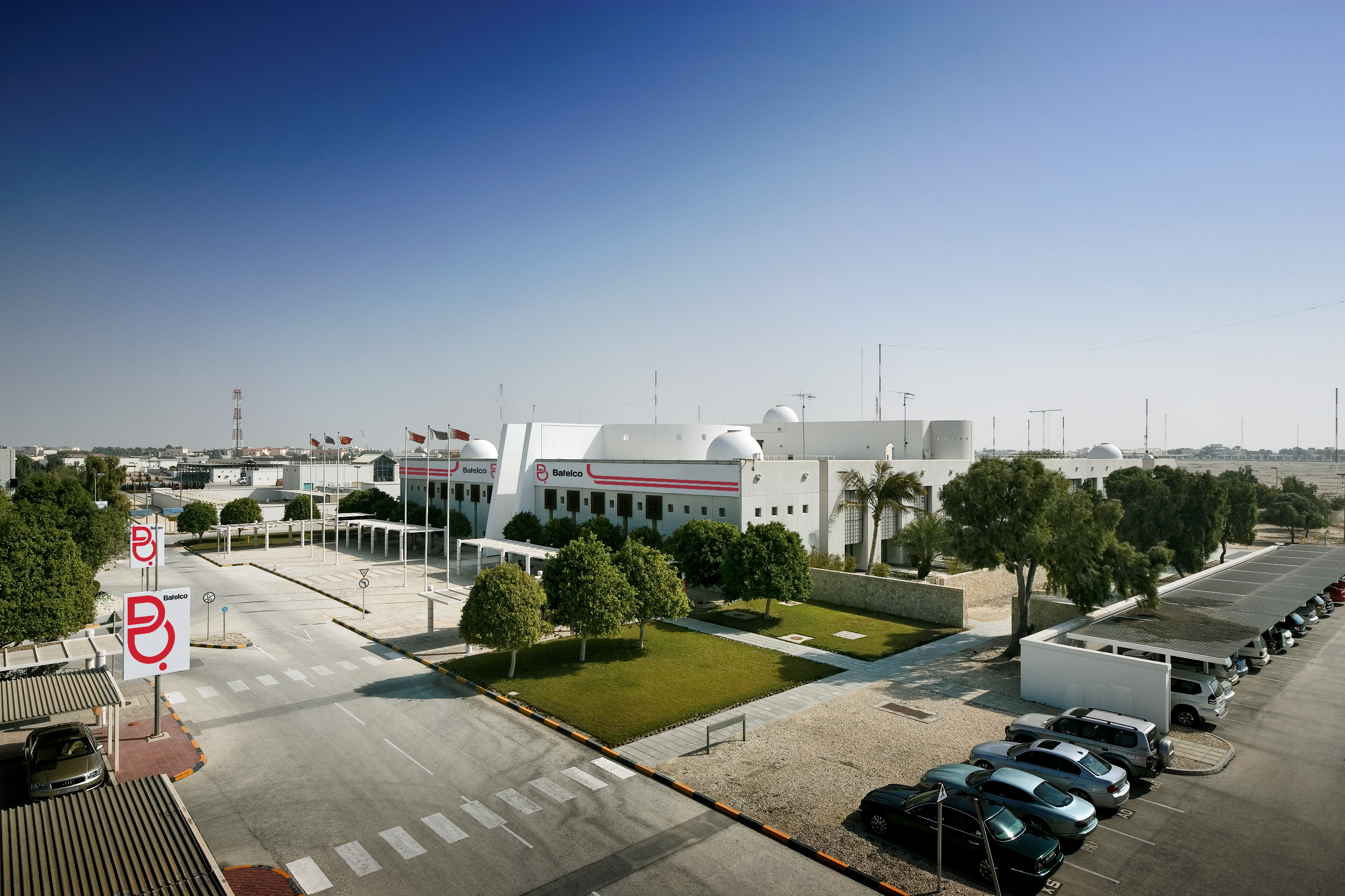
- Type: Public
- Traded as: BHSE:BEYON
- Industry: Telecommunications
- Founded: 1981; 45 years ago
- Headquarters: P.O. Box 14; Building 1095, Road 1425, Block 1014; Hamala, Bahrain
- Area served: Middle East; North Africa; Europe; Indian Ocean; South America
- Key people: Abdulla Bin Khalifa Al Khalifa (chairman of the board); Mikkel Vinter (CEO)
- Products: Fixed-line telephone; Mobile telephony; Broadband
- Services: Integrated Communications
- Revenue: ▲$1.127 billion (2023)
- Operating income: ▲$275.9 million (2023)
- Net income: ▲$191 million (2023)
- Total assets: ▲$3.01 billion (2023)
- Number of employees: 936 (2022)
- Subsidiaries: List: Batelco Bahrain Umniah Mobile Communications Qualitynet Etihad Atheeb Telecom Sabafon Batelco Egypt Qualitynet Algeria Sure Dhiraagu
- Website: batelco.com

Bahrain Telecommunication Company BSC, trading as Batelco (Arabic: بتلكو), is the principal telecommunications company in Bahrain. The company's headquarters are in Hamala, Bahrain, and the company is listed on the Bahrain Bourse. The Chairman of the Board is Abdulla Bin Khalifa Al Khalifa. In December 2022, the company was acquired by Beyon, and was later renamed to Batelco by Beyon.

The company provides services for mobiles through UMTS 2100 and LTE 1800 (the GSM network was shut down on 31 December 2019) while its residential Internet is an ADSL, Wireless (4G/5G) or FTTH service. Batelco is one of Bahrain's five Internet service providers.

Batelco is a telecommunications company. The name is a combination of the words, Bahrain and telecommunication.

== History ==
Batelco was established in 1981 as a Bahraini public joint stock company and has an authorized share capital of BD200 million (US$531 million).

Batelco's major shareholders include Orascom Investment Holding (60%) and the Government of Bahrain (through Mumtalakat Holding Company, Amber Holding Company and Social Insurance Organisation; 40%), various financial and commercial organizations, and private Bahraini, Gulf Cooperation Council (GCC) countries and international investors.

== See also ==
- Telecommunications in Bahrain
