= Defence industry of Vietnam =

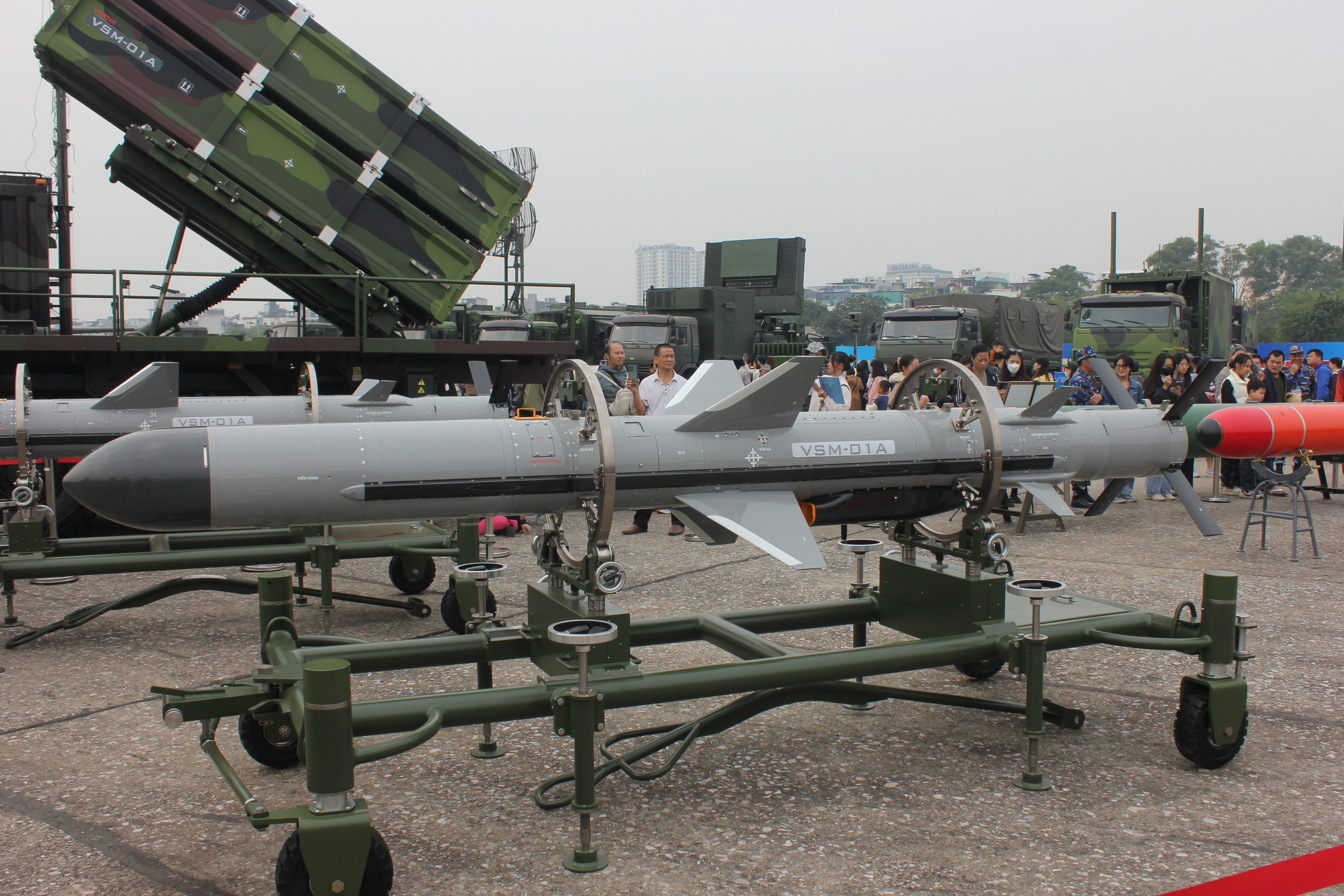
The VSM-01A anti-ship missile being displayed with its VCS-01 missile system, with various Vietnamese indigenous radars being exhibited in the background during the 2024 Vietnam Defence Expo.

The defence industry of Vietnam encompasses the research, development, and manufacturing of military arms and technology by Vietnam's government-affiliated entities. It is largely state-owned and managed by the Ministry of National Defence, mostly led by the General Department of Defence Industry and Viettel, with a focus on achieving self-sufficiency in armaments. Historically, Vietnam has been a major importer of weapons – between 2010 and 2022 it ranked among the top six arms importers in the Asia-Pacific region, relying heavily on Russian-made equipment (about 81.5% of Vietnam's arms imports from 1995 to 2022 came from Russia).

Logo of Vietnam Defence Industry - the government agency tasked with developing, organizing, and managing core national defense industrial bases.

Vietnam has embarked on ambitious programs to build a modern, self-reliant defence industry by 2030, capable of producing advanced weapons for its own armed forces and reducing dependence on foreign suppliers. The government also views the sector as serving dual-use potential for both military and civilian economic benefits, and has signaled the intent to eventually export Vietnamese-made defence products. This drive has been marked by increased investment in domestic R&D, the showcasing locally made weapons at international arms fairs, and high-level policies to integrate Vietnam's defence industry into global supply chains.

== Historical development ==
=== Feudal dynasties ===
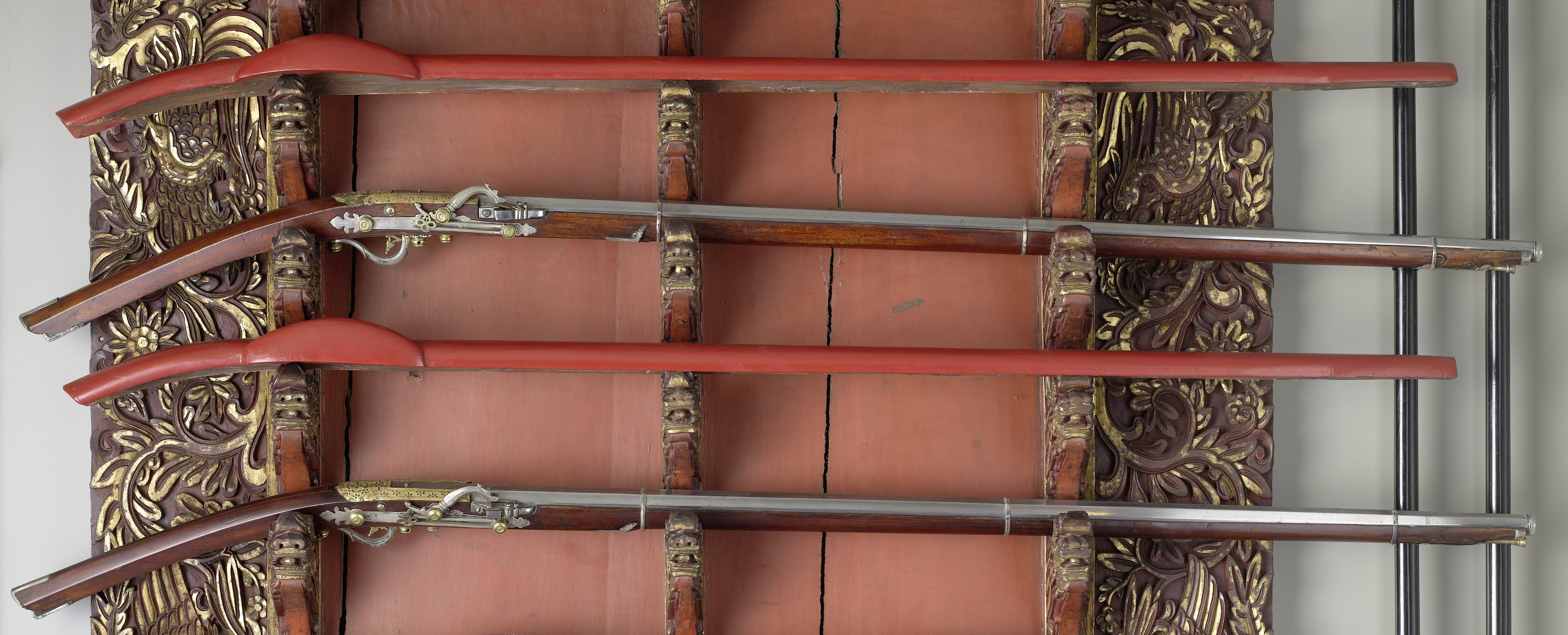
Two Vietnamese arquebuses with their dust cover. From Cornelis Tromp's weapon rack, dated 1650–1679 AD.

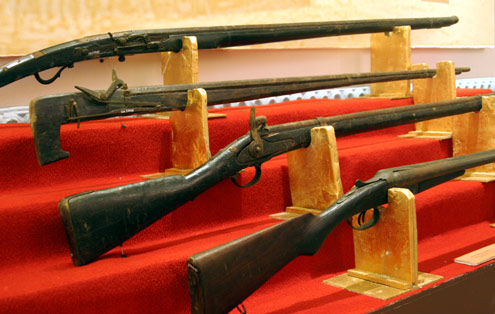
Two Vietnamese matchlock guns (first and second from above).

Đại Việt has a relatively early history of using gunpowder weapons. At the end of the 14th century, king Po Binasuor of Champa, while surveying the Hải Triều River, died in battle when he was hit by a hand cannon from the Trần army. In the Hồ dynasty, Hồ Nguyên Trừng successfully invented the Thần Cơ Sang cannon. By the time of the Lê Sơ period, gunpowder weapons was widely used in the army. In Thailand, a gun initially thought to have originated in China was discovered, however, based on the inscriptions on the gun, it was confirmed to be of Đại Việt origin. This is most likely a relic from the invasion of the Lanna kingdom (present day Chiang Mai) under Lê Thánh Tông from 1479 to 1484.

By the 16th century, when Europeans came to Đại Việt for trading, Western weapons were purchased by the Trịnh and Nguyễn lords to equip their armies, and muskets began to be imported into Đại Việt ever since. Tomé Pires in his Suma Oriental (1515) mentioned that Cochinchina had an innumerable number of musketeers and small bombards, and that a lot of gunpowder was used in warfare and amusements. At that time, the firearm techniques of Đại Việt were considered highly advanced — from small-caliber matchlock guns to cannons. Firearms were also widely used by civilians in daily life.The Đại Việt musket was not only used domestically, but it was also introduced to China after the border conflicts between the Mạc dynasty and ethnic minorities in Guangxi and Yunnan.

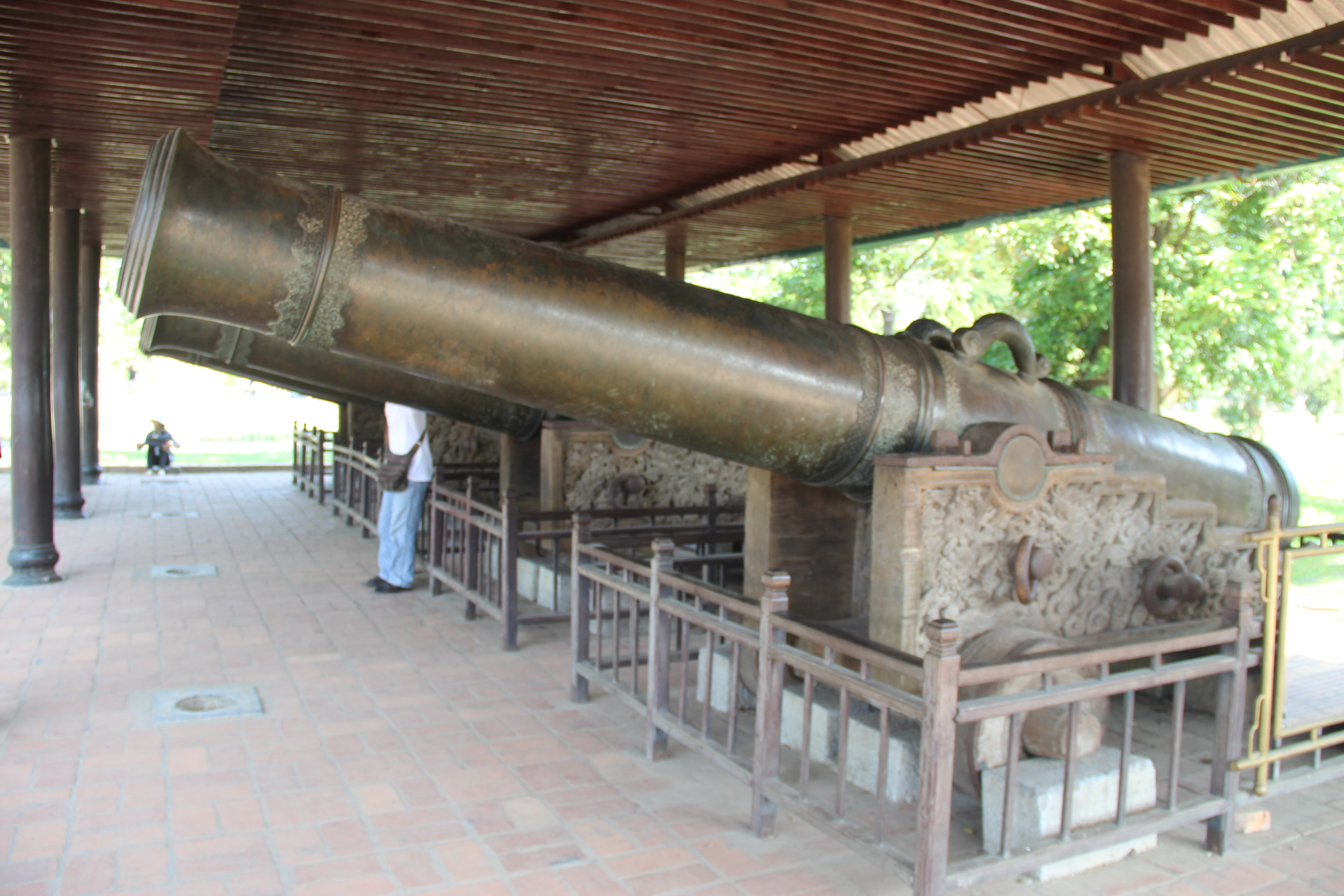
Ceremony cannon produced under Nguyễn Dynasty

The Jiaozhi arquebus was not only appreciated by the Chinese, but also highly praised especially by Western observers for its high accuracy from what they saw in the Lê-Mạc and Trịnh-Nguyễn wars. The Ming dynasty also rated Đại Việt arquebus as "the best gun in the world", even surpassing the Ottoman gun, the Japanese gun, and the European gun.The Đại Việt gun could penetrate several layers of iron armor and kill from 2 to 5 people with one single bullet while not emitting any loud sounds when fired. A Qing-era record, 南越筆記 (Nányuè bǐjì), linked the Vietnam arquebus with Java arquebus.

However, later on, due to the country's isolationist policies, firearm casting techniques gradually declined and became outdated. By the Nguyễn dynasty, although the guns produced had impressive appearances and large calibers, they were far less effective compared to French models.

=== Resistance against French Colonial and Empire of Japan (1885-1945) ===
In the Can Vuong movement, the majority of the resistance troops used homemade flintlock guns and rudimentary weapons, but in there on Hương Khê Uprising, Vietnamese general in the Cần Vương movement, Cao Văn Thắng, managed to copy the design of "an 1874 type fast-firing rifle of French". However, the Vietnamese version did not have a rifled barrel, and the range was limited.

During the Bai Say uprising, the small factory engineers of the insurgents also improved the guns of the French army, or adapted the models to manufacture versions suitable for use in ambushes, or concealable upon a person, or in bundles of firewood: “… In order to achieve high efficiency, they created a remarkable gun: the Mút (Berthier rifle Vietnamese called) cavalry gun with a short stock, long barrel, this gun can be hidden in the sleeve, in the trouser leg or on the chest. This leader (referring to Doi Van) in a short time of surrender also told us that there were many other gun models”

In the early 1940s, the Cao–Bac–Lang Provincial Party Committee mobilized villagers to set up forges making knives, spears, swords, and flintlock gun, laying the foundation for a self-sufficient arms industry. In March 1944, the Lung Hoang workshop was established with only rudimentary tools and donated scrap metal but soon became a key site for repairing and producing mines and grenades. After initial experiments with simple tin-cased grenades and unsuccessful mines, it successfully reverse-engineered American-style cast-iron grenades stamped “V.M.” (stand for Viet Minh) and repaired various firearms.

Following Party instructions, the Northern Regional Party Committee created the Lang Chè weapons factory in Tiên Sơn, Bắc Ninh, which not only repaired small arms but also mass-produced stamped cast-iron grenades marked “V.M.” for liberation forces, contributing directly to the August Revolution of 1945. These early workshops pioneered small, mobile, easily relocatable production, a model that by late 1947 had expanded to around 200 facilities with 20,000 workers, supplying millions of weapons—from grenades and mortars to recoilless guns—forming the technological and organizational backbone of Vietnam's wartime arms industry and earning recognition even from French observers for their unexpected strength and effectiveness.

On May 7, 1944, based on the policy of the Party Central Committee, the Viet Minh General Department issued a directive to prepare for the uprising, which clearly stated: what to use to fight the enemy? There were several ways to get weapons: self-made, bought and seized from the enemy. Our people had to make some of their own weapons so that when they rose up, they would have something to kill the enemy. What they could not make themselves had to be bought or seized from the enemy. To buy, they organized donations and set up a "gun purchase fund". As for seizing the enemy's property, there were two ways: attacking enemy camps, gun depots, and patrol troops to seize weapons and mobilizing enemy soldiers, making them aware, and bringing the enemy's guns back to us.

=== First Indochina War ===
Vietnam's modern defence industry traces its roots to the First Indochina War (1946–1954) and the Vietnam War (1955–1975), when the country (then North Vietnam) established rudimentary arms workshops to support its military efforts. During this period, Vietnamese technicians produced basic munitions, homemade explosives, and refurbished captured equipment to supplement supplies from abroad.

During the resistance war against the French, due to limited access to foreign weapon supplies, most of Vietnam's weapons came either from spoils of war captured after battles or from military workshops located in safe zones. During this period, the primary task of Vietnam's military industry was to research and produce anti-tank weapons based on bazooka models seized from French forces. This task was assigned to a research team led by Trần Đại Nghĩa, a Vietnamese engineer who had returned from France. The work began in November 1946 and continued until February 1947, with the resulting weapons tested in combat during the war against the French, and later deployed in the Việt Bắc Campaign of 1947. The research team also successfully developed recoilless rifles designated as SKZ, with calibers of 60mm, 81mm and 120mm. These weapons were widely used by Việt Minh units throughout the war.

In addition, the Việt Minh also produced a large quantity of explosives such as landmines and grenades in military workshops located in liberated zones. These weapons were manufactured using cast iron sourced from metallurgy facilities in Interzone IV, and explosives repurposed from bombs and unexploded ordnance left behind by French forces. Although rudimentary, these weapons were widely used in ambush operations conducted by guerrilla units and inflicted significant damage on French troops.

At other infantry weapons workshops, the military also produced a number of improvised small arms, notably submachine guns modeled after the Sten gun, Grease gun (súng Ghít in Vietnamese), as well as various types of pistols like Enfield No2. In addition, infantry ammunition was also manufactured on a small scale in these military workshops at the time.

=== Vietnam War ===
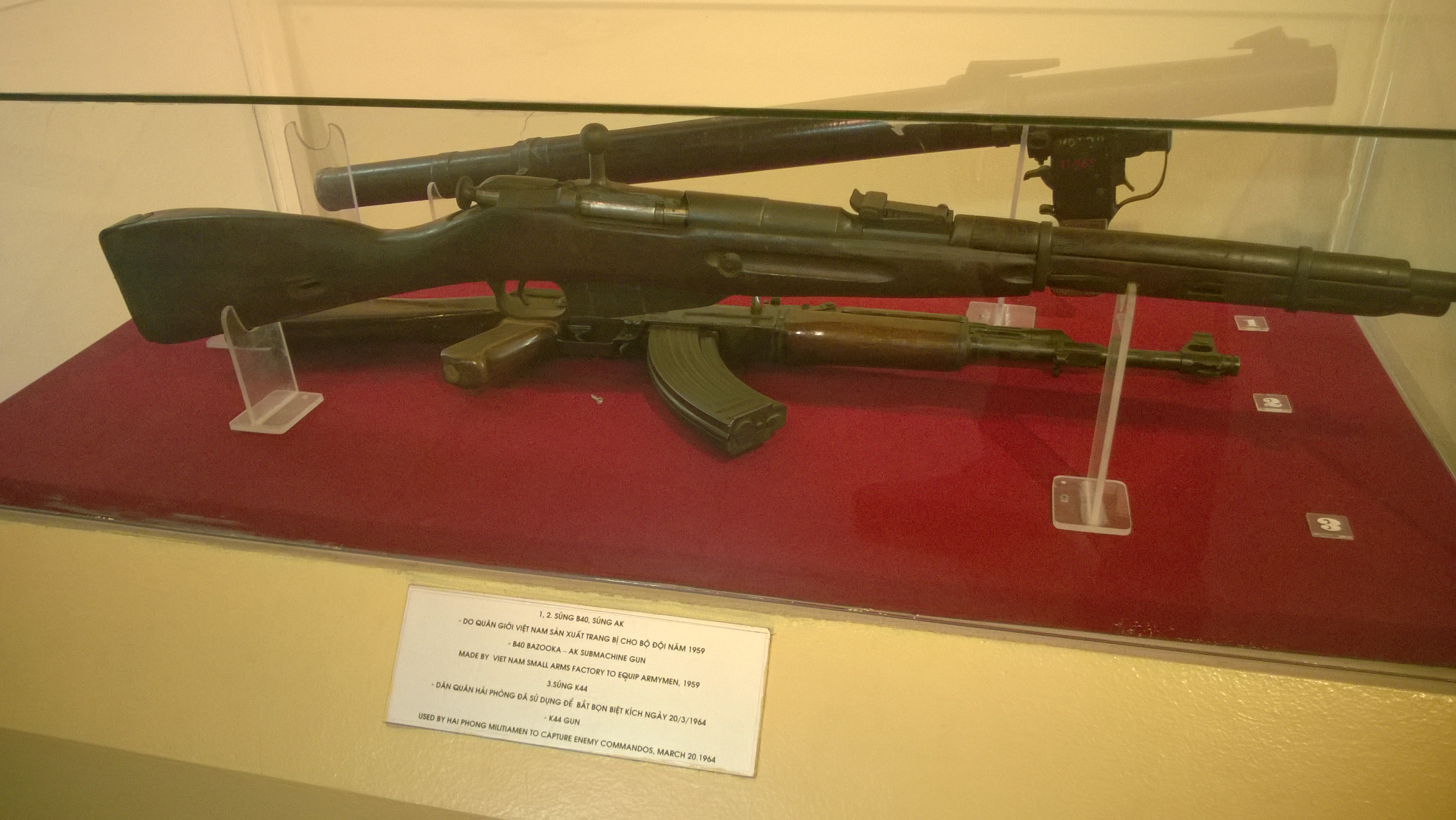
AK-47 and RPG-2 produced in Vietnam war

During this period, several factories in the Democratic Republic of Vietnam such as Z1, Z2 and X10 —precursors to today's Z111, Z113 and Z117 factories — were established with the goal of producing domestically manufactured weapons. These facilities were built with technical and logistical support from socialist countries, marking an important step in laying the industrial foundation for Vietnam's long-term defense self-sufficiency. These factories began producing a limited number of light weapons such as SKS, AK-47, RPG-2 and TUL-1 light machine guns in Factory Z1. In addition, infantry ammunition was produced on a larger scale at facilities such as Factory Z113 and Factory Z114, contributing significantly to the logistical needs of the People's Army of Vietnam. Nonetheless, the bulk of heavy arms – from rifles to artillery and aircraft – were provided by socialist allies, and the indigenous industrial base remained limited in scope and technology.

In 1965, as the United States escalated its bombing campaign against the North, the resistance war for the liberation of the South entered a highly intense phase. The demand for weapon production increased both in quantity and urgency. On July 13, 1965, China signed an agreement to assist Vietnam in expanding the Z1 and Z2 factories, followed by the construction of eight additional military industry facilities to support weapons production. From these efforts emerged the precursors to factories such as Z115, Z121, and Z129.

At this time, weapons production activities in the southern battlefield of Vietnam were relatively rudimentary. They primarily focused on manufacturing improvised weapons such as landmines and grenades, along with limited production of copied firearms based on captured models such as the M1911 pistol and MAT-49 submachine gun. Some workshops also modified captured weapons to be compatible with ammunition supplied by allied countries or adapted firearms such as the M1 Garand to suit specific battlefield conditions. And any copy and modified gun like Thompson submachine gun, MAS-36 rifle, M1 Carbine, Arisaka, Mauser rifle, Tokarev TT, Mauser C96, Luger P08, BAR, and SVT-40.

=== 1975 to 2000 ===
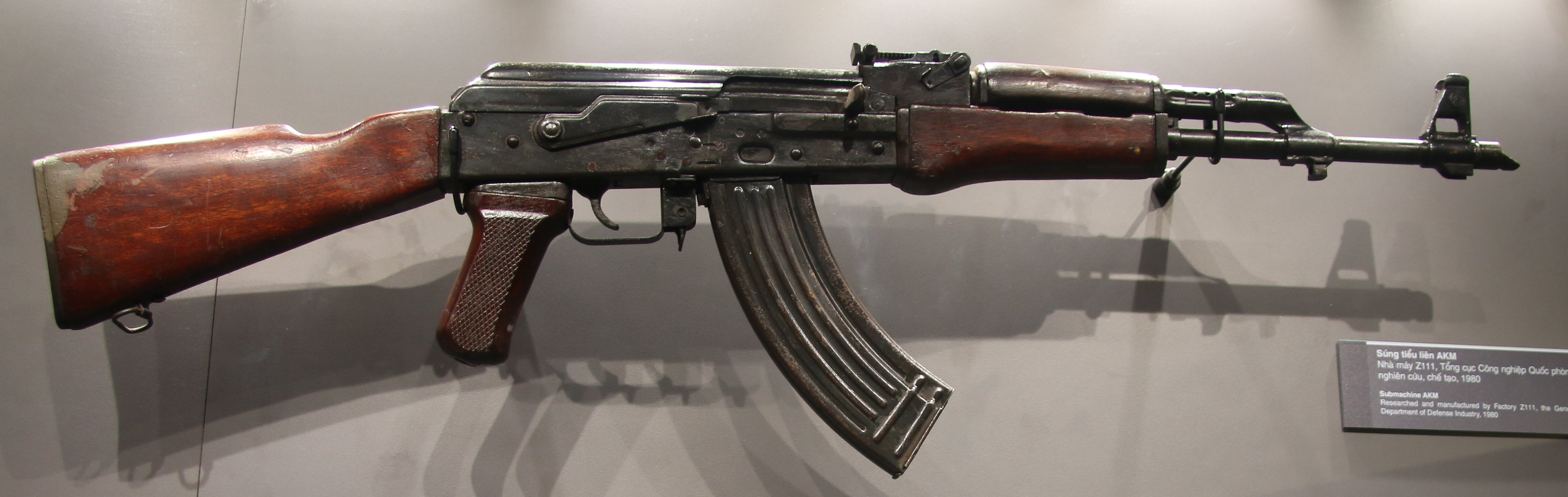
AKM produced by Z111 Factory in 1980

In the post-war period, particularly after the reunification of the country in 1975, the Vietnamese military redirected its focus toward upgrading existing weaponry and establishing greater self-reliance in defense research and production. This shift was driven by both strategic necessity and the limited access to external military aid due to shifting global alliances. Key efforts included the development of indigenous military technologies and the modernization of aging Soviet-era equipment.

Among the notable achievements during this period were the TL-1 reconnaissance aircraft and the HL-1 and HL-2 trainer aircraft. These projects were seen as important milestones in demonstrating Vietnam's growing aerospace engineering capabilities. Designed and manufactured domestically, these aircraft incorporated locally developed airframes and systems, although their engines were still imported from foreign partners due to technological limitations. The successful deployment of these aircraft underscored the potential of Vietnam's defense industry to support basic aviation requirements.

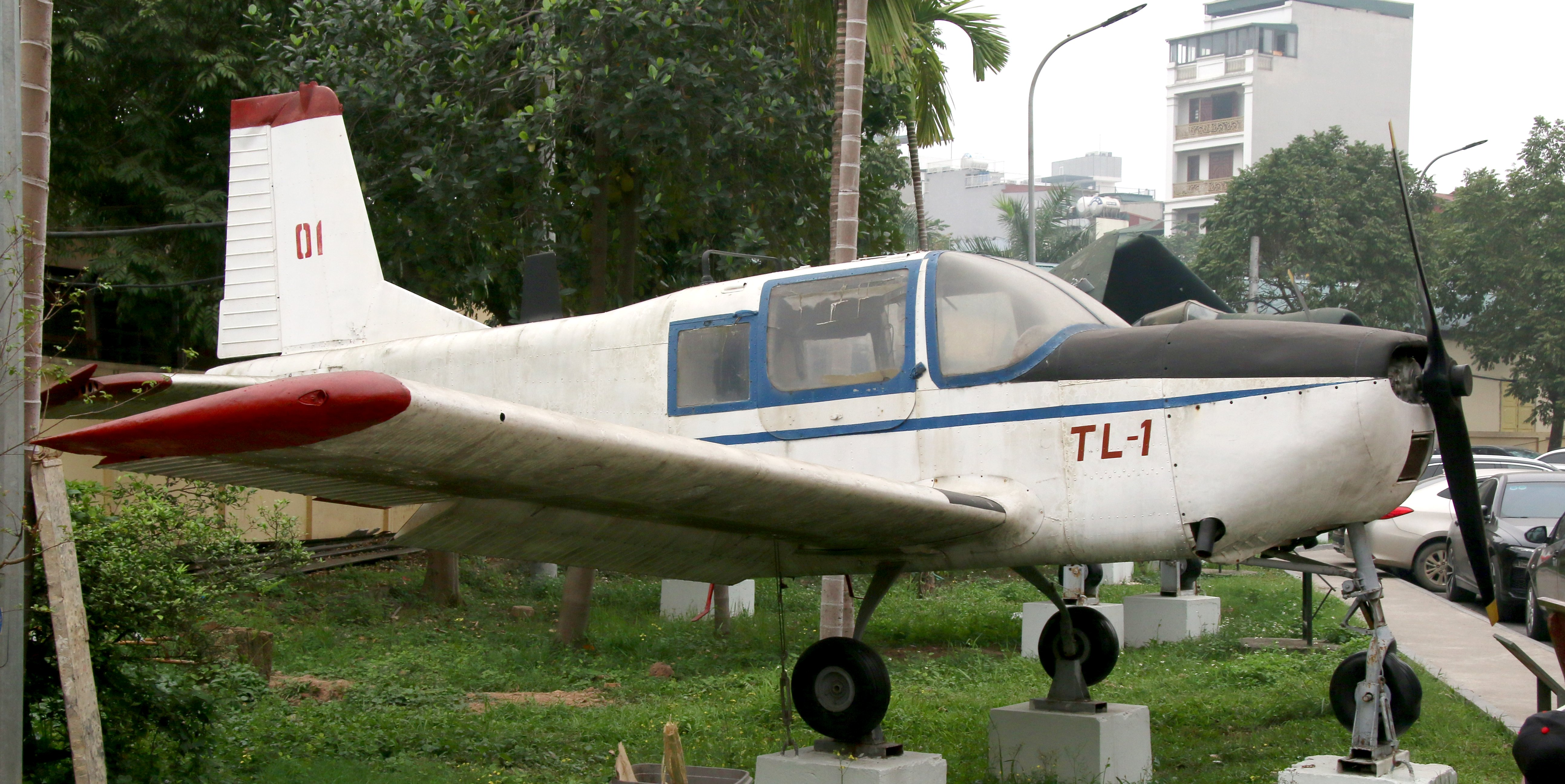
TL-1 reconnaissance aircraft

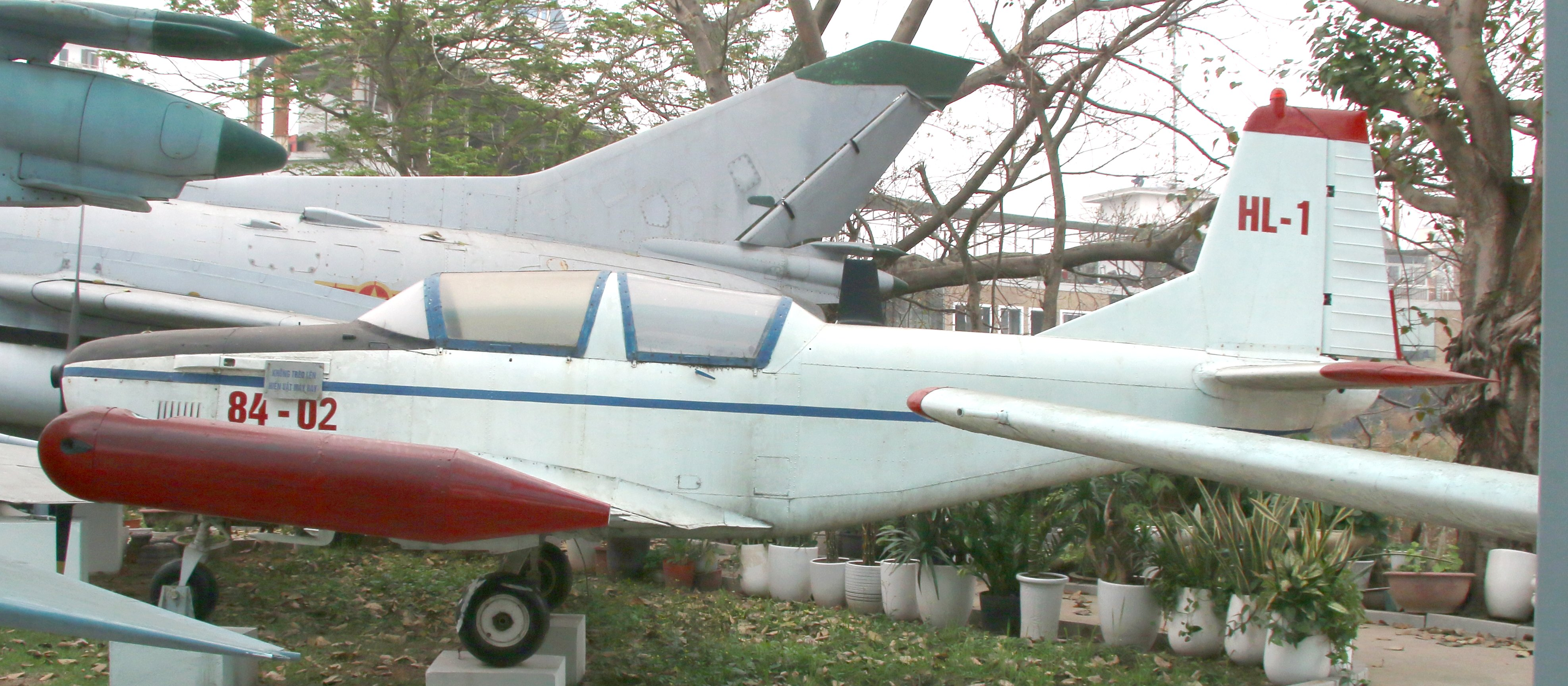
HL-1 trainer aircraft

In parallel with aircraft development, research institutes under the Ministry of Defense were also assigned to upgrade missile systems. One of the most significant efforts involved enhancing the performance of Scud tactical ballistic missiles, which had been supplied by the Soviet Union. Vietnamese scientists worked to improve both the range and accuracy of these missile systems, reflecting a broader effort to extend the country's strategic deterrence capabilities with limited resources. This period laid the foundation for later advances in localized weapons production and contributed to Vietnam's long-term goal of building an independent and modern defense industry.

In addition, the military undertook technical maintenance and refurbishment of captured equipment acquired during the war, such as M16 rifles, M113 armored personnel carriers, and other American-origin weaponry. Due to embargoes in place at the time, Vietnam had no access to original spare parts or technical documentation for these systems. As a result, engineers and technicians adapted by reverse-engineering components and substituting parts with those sourced from Soviet equipment. In some cases, major assemblies such as engines or mechanical subsystems were replaced entirely with Soviet-compatible alternatives.

During this period, Vietnam also purchased propellant and explosive production lines from North Korea. These lines were installed at factories Z113 and Z114, serving as a foundation for the eventual complete mastery of infantry ammunition production. Some sources also mention that, during this period, Vietnam was transferred technologies enabling the production of ballistic missiles such as the Hwasong-6.

=== 2000 to now ===
Since the year 2000, Vietnam's defense industry has seen significant development, transitioning from a reliance on imported weaponry to becoming increasingly self-sufficient through international cooperation and indigenous technological innovation. This article highlights key accomplishments, including Vietnam's defense partnerships, particularly with Israel and Russia, domestic developments such as the VCM-01 cruise missile, UAVs, advanced radars, naval vessel production, and modernization of production facilities.

==== International Cooperation in Defense ====
Vietnam's defense modernization has been underpinned by extensive international cooperation. Instead of just buying finished weapons, Vietnam often pursues co-production, joint development, and technology transfer agreements with partner countries. Each of these partnerships focuses on enabling Vietnamese factories to eventually produce or assemble the equipment at home, reflecting a consistent strategy of “learning by doing.”

===== Collaboration with Israel =====
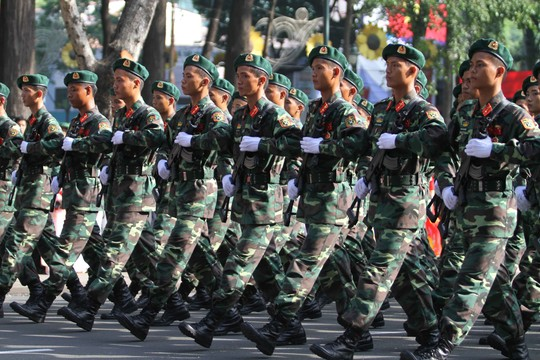
Vietnam People's Army Soldier equipped with Vietnamese-made Galil ACE

One of Vietnam's most significant defense partnerships in the 21st century has been with Israel. Despite having no Cold War-era ties, Israel rapidly became Vietnam's second-largest arms supplier after Russia. In 2014, Vietnam signed an agreement with Israel Weapon Industries (IWI) to locally produce the advanced Galil ACE assault rifle at the Z111 Factory. Additionally, the Z111 factory is also involved in manufacturing several weapon components for the Israeli company IWI.

Furthermore, Israel and Vietnam cooperated to upgrade older Soviet-era equipment, notably the T-54/55 tanks. The modernized T-54M3 variant featured advanced fire control systems, reactive armor, and a 105mm main gun, greatly enhancing the capabilities of these older platforms. The project stopped because of high cost.

===== Collaboration with Russia =====
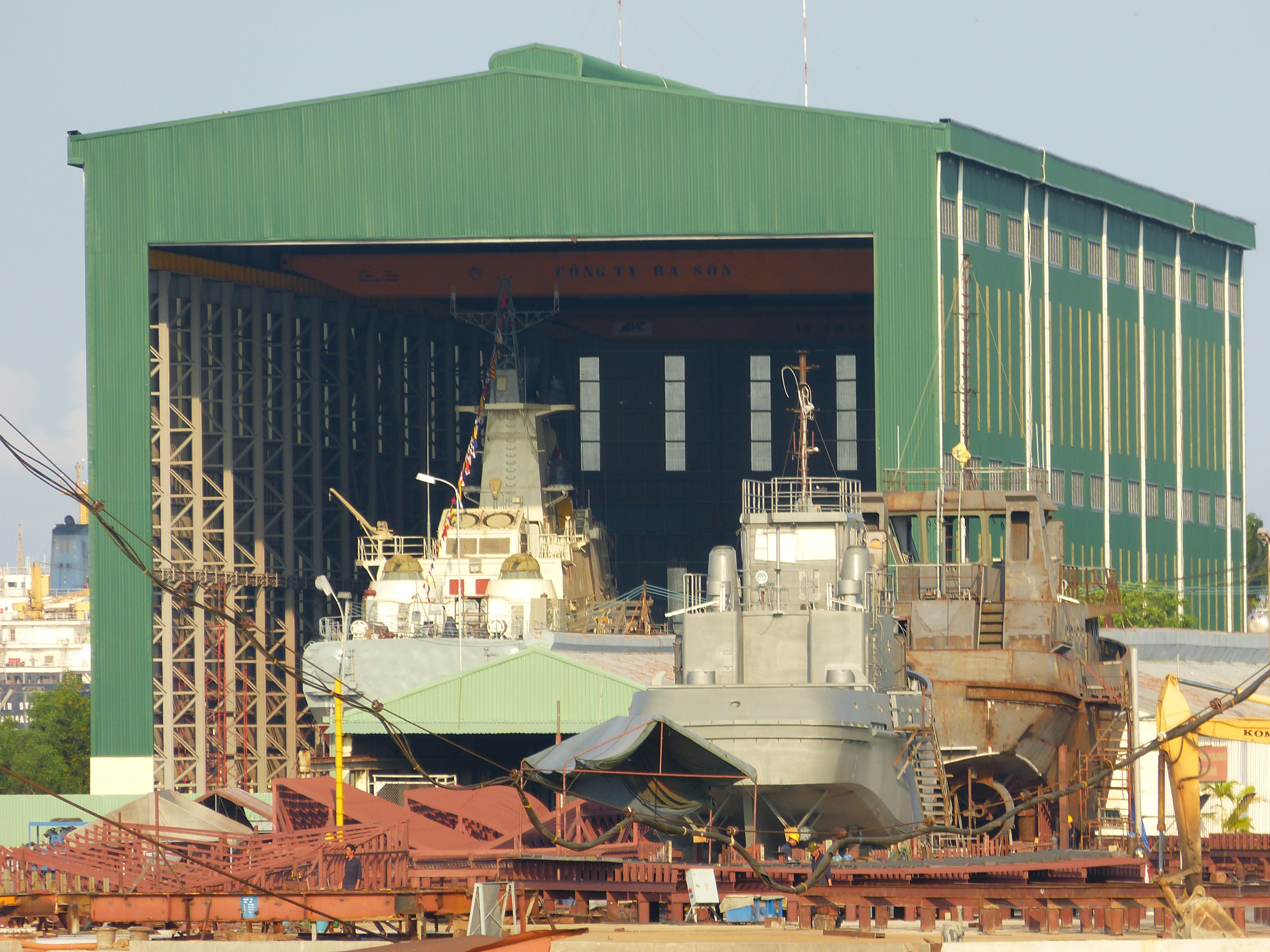
Molniya-class missile ship being built at Ba Son Shipyard

Russia remains Vietnam's traditional defense partner, significantly contributing to its naval capabilities through technology transfers. Through the KCT-15 project, Russia provided Vietnam with support in maintaining and ensuring the technical readiness of the Kh-35 missile, laying the groundwork for Vietnam to develop and manufacture its own missile, the VCM-01.Russia has supported Vietnam in the field of military transport vehicles by establishing factories for military vehicle production in Vietnam, such as KamAZ, UAZ, and GAZ. Russia also transferred technology to Vietnam for the production of Igla man-portable air-defense systems (MANPADS).

Russia is also an important partner in Vietnam's shipbuilding industry. Many vessels of the Vietnamese Navy have been designed and newly built with the assistance of the Russian Federation, ranging from support ships to missile boats. Vietnam successfully produced six Molniya-class missile corvettes under Russian guidance between 2014 and 2016.

===== Other countries =====
Besides Russia and Israel, Vietnam also cooperated with Belarus, and the Netherlands. Belarus aided Vietnam in developing advanced radar systems, specifically the RV-series capable of detecting stealth aircraft base on theirs Vostok-E.

Additionally, Vietnam has cooperated in technology transfer with Dixi Microtechniques, a private French company specializing in precision mechanics and mechatronics. This collaboration has enabled factories such as Z181, Z129, and Z121 to fully master the production of electronic fuzes for various types of artillery shells. Serbia is also a partner of Vietnam, having transferred the technology for the Edepro G2000/52 rocket to the country, which allows it to manufacture extended-range rockets for the BM-21 system.

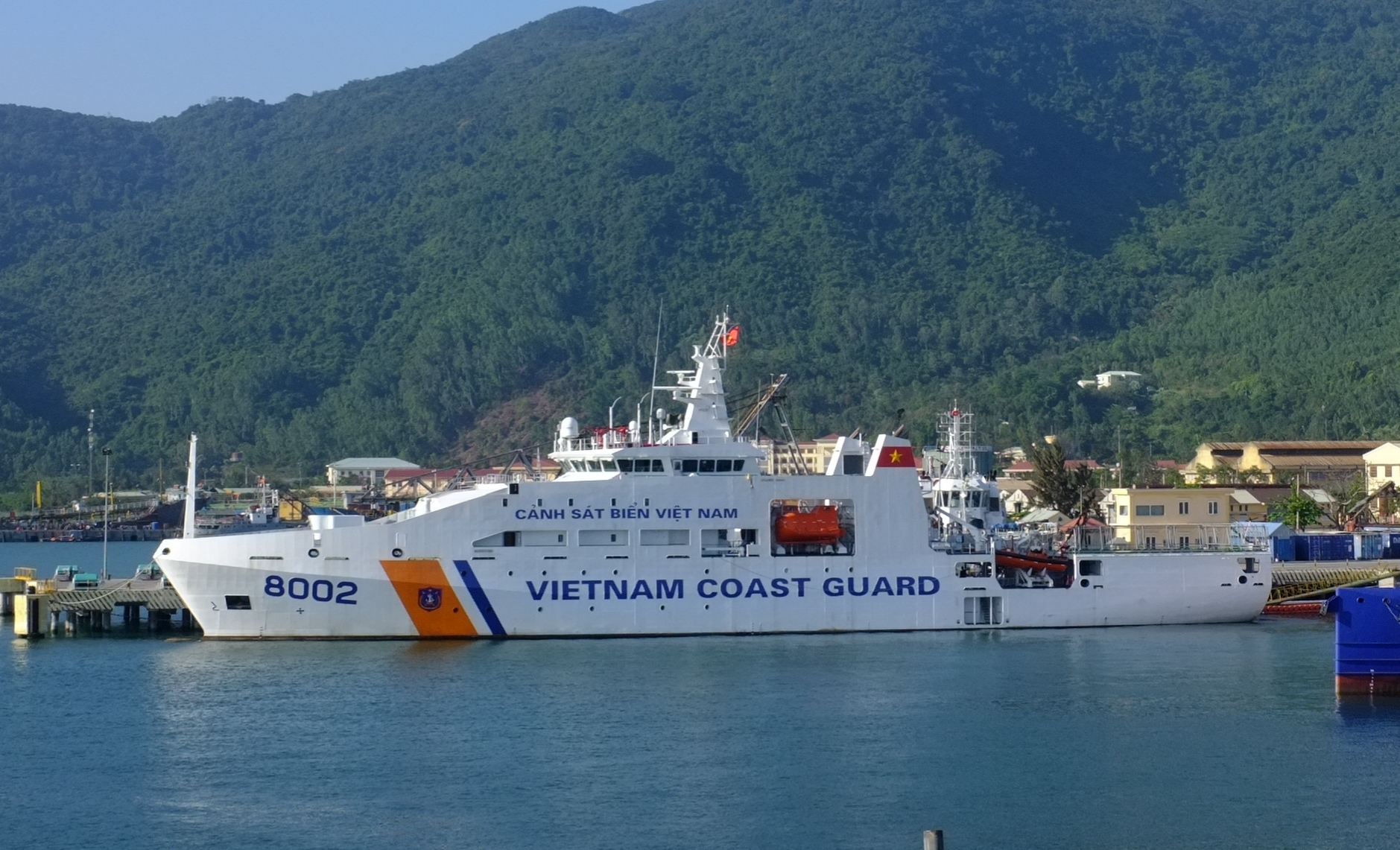
A DN2000 (Damen OPV 2400) built by a Vietnamese shipyard for Vietnam Coast Guard.

The Netherlands, though not a traditional arms supplier to Vietnam, has been instrumental in naval shipbuilding cooperation. Dutch shipbuilder Damen Group entered a joint venture with Vietnam's Shipbuilding Industry Corporation in 2007, and by 2014 Damen had opened the Song Cam shipyard in Haiphong – a modern facility initially capable of producing up to 40 vessels annually. Through this partnership, Damen has supplied the Vietnam People's Navy and Coast Guard with several modern vessels. By 2022, Vietnamese-Damen cooperation had yielded at least one naval survey ship, four large offshore patrol vessels (OPVs), and four salvage tugs – all built in Vietnam to Damen designs. These include the 2,200-ton DN2000-class OPVs which significantly enhanced the Coast Guard's blue-water patrol capacity.

== Today's Vietnamese defense industry ==
A standout entity in the 2000s–2010s is the military-run Viettel Group (originally a telecom company) which expanded into defense manufacturing – essentially becoming Vietnam's equivalent of a defense conglomerate. Viettel High-Tech Industries invested heavily in R&D and by the 2020s has produced a wide range of defense products: encrypted communication systems, surveillance drones, radars, naval electronics, and even cyber-security solutions. Viettel's model of plowing profits from its civilian telecom business into defense R&D has accelerated innovation. For example, Viettel's engineers designed the hardware and software for Vietnam's first encrypted tactical radio and are now exporting some of these devices to regional countries.

The Vietnamese defense industry's modernization is also organizational. The General Department of Defence Industry oversees numerous factories (designated Z111, Z113, etc.), many of which have been upgraded with new infrastructure since 2000. The goal is not only to meet the VPA's needs but also to possibly export in the future. Indeed, Vietnam has recently showcased its weapons at international defense expos, indicating growing confidence in its “Made in Vietnam” armaments. From small arms to missiles, the period from 2000 to the present has been transformative: Vietnam can now produce a broad spectrum of military gear at home, a significant change from two decades ago. This was achieved by smartly combining imported technology with an indigenous drive for innovation, positioning Vietnam's defense industry as an emerging producer in Southeast Asia.

=== Infantry Weapon and Personal Equipment ===
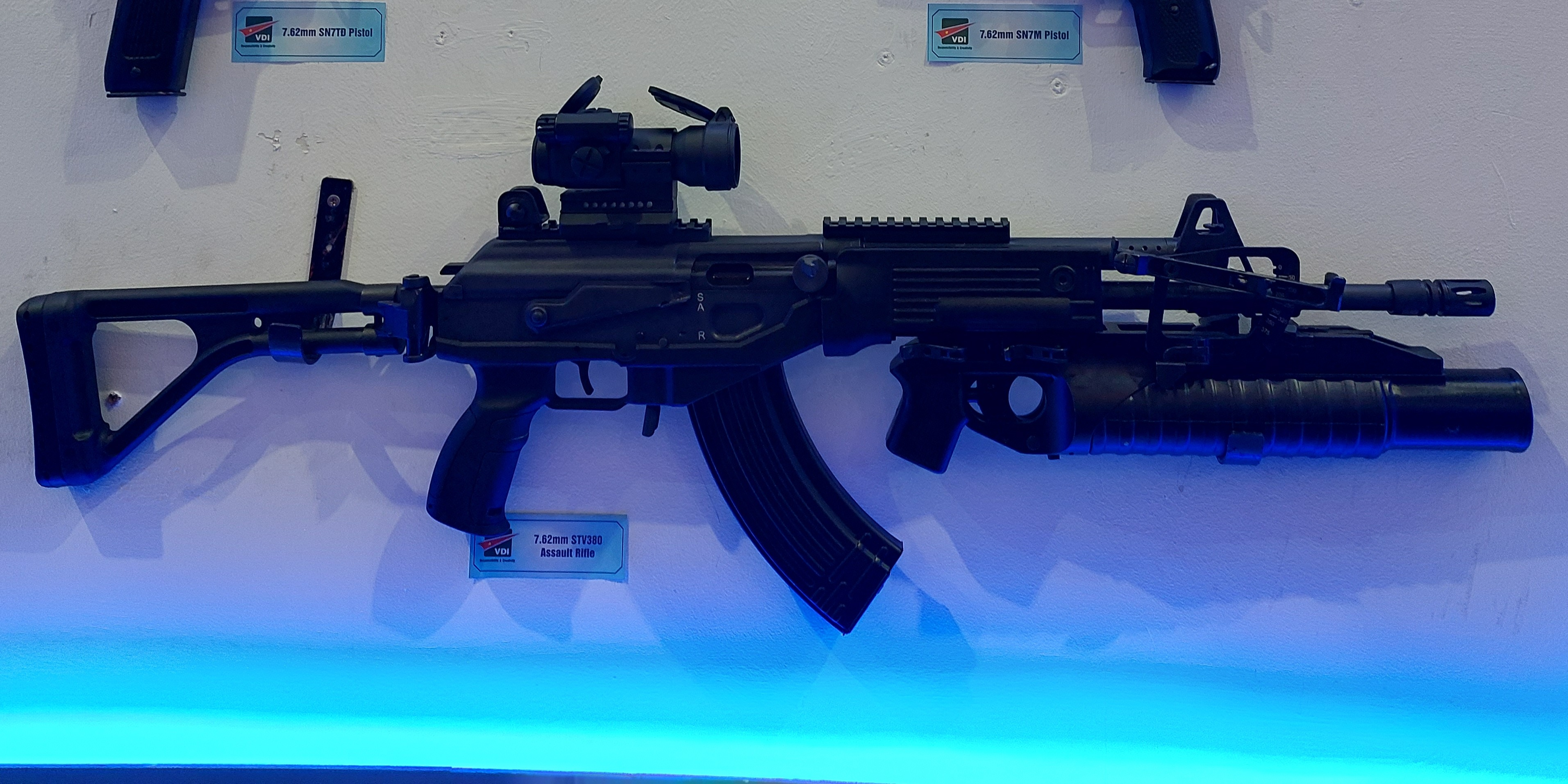
STV-380 produced by Z111 Factory equipped with OPL-40M

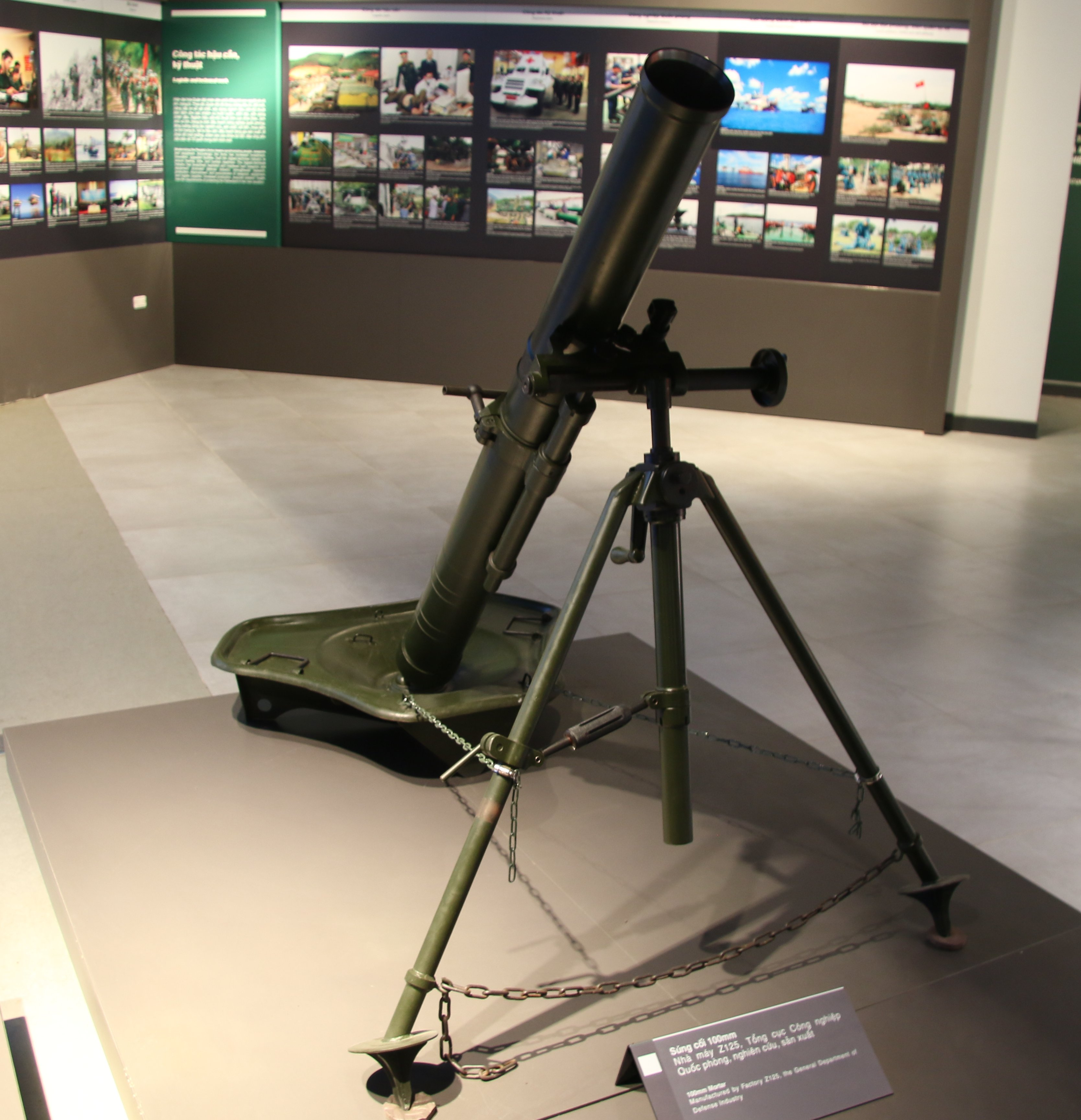
SC100TX mortar- the standard heavy mortar of VPA produced by Z125 Factory

Modernizing infantry weapons and domestic arms factories has been another component of Vietnam's defense industry growth. A flagship project was the upgrade of Factory Z111 (Z111 Arms Company) to produce world-class small arms. The factory was extensively upgraded with modern CNC machinery and precision tools, allowing it to manufacture high-quality firearms. This experience later enabled Z111 to develop Vietnam's own STV rifle, which are indigenous designs influenced by the Galil/AK platforms. Z111 also produce a wide range of other small arm like SN19 pistol series, submachine gun, precision sniper rifle, light and heavy machine gun. Other factories under the General Department of Defence Industry also have the capability to produce various types of heavy weaponry, such as anti-tank weapons, heavy mortars, and grenade launchers. In summary, Vietnam possesses the full capability to manufacture all types of infantry weapons to equip military units up to the divisional level — from assault rifles, machine guns, sniper rifles, anti-tank weapons, to ammunition, mines, grenades, and support equipment. This capability is remarkable within the Southeast Asian region, demonstrating Vietnam's increasingly advanced self-reliance in defense industry development.

In terms of personal equipment, Vietnam has long been one of the world's major producers of military uniforms, thanks to its strong textile and garment industry. Tactical gear such as body armor, backpacks, and military boots is also manufactured by factories under the VDI for internationally renowned brands. Z176 Factory has the capability to produce the full range of individual soldier equipment, while X61 Factory supplies the MV5 gas mask for the military. Meanwhile, ballistic armor plates are produced by Z117 Factory, and personal radios are provided by Viettel.

=== Ground vehicle ===
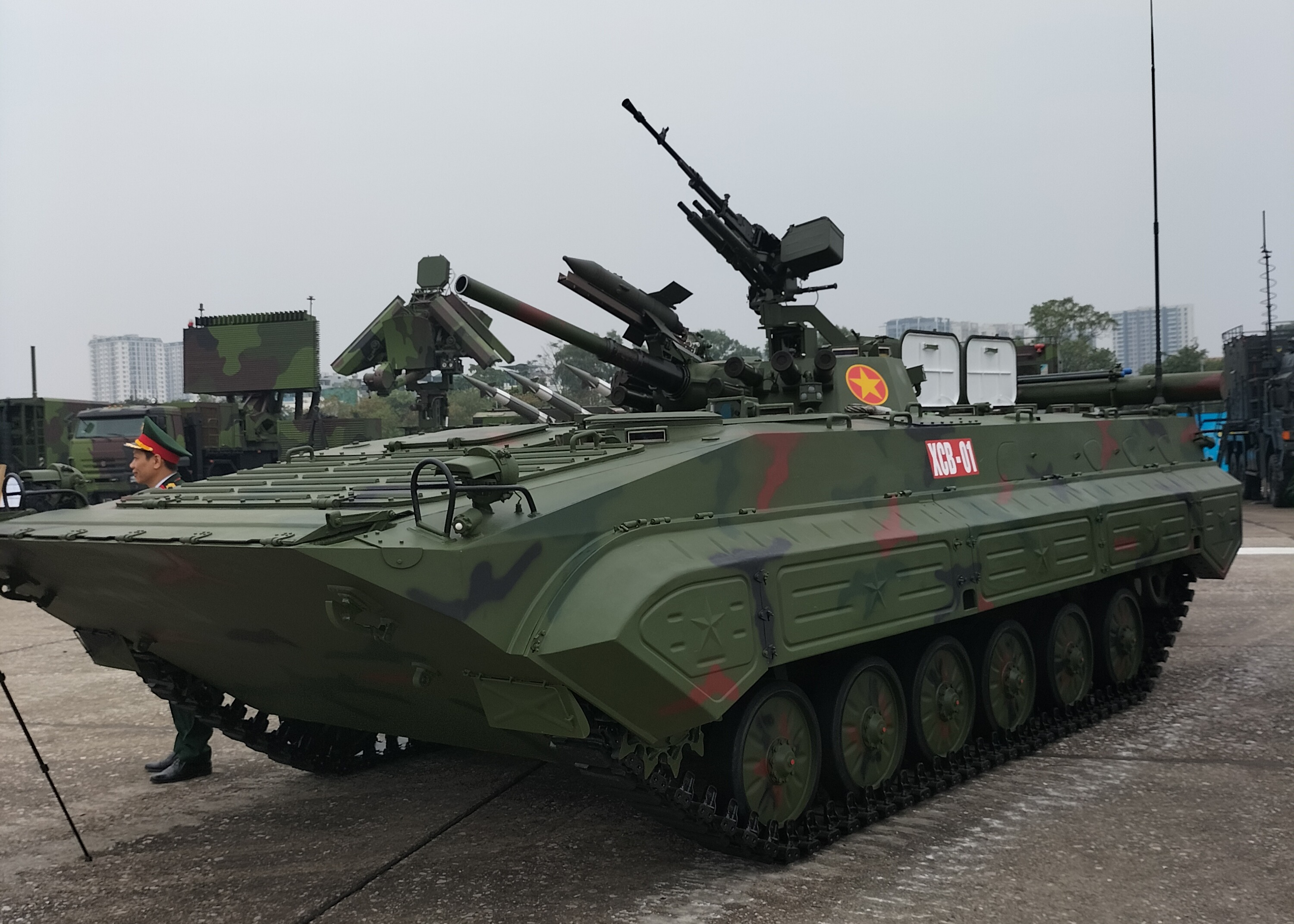
XCB-01 infantry fighting vehicle

In recent years, Vietnam has collaborated with military vehicle manufacturers such as KamAZ, UAZ, GAZ, and MAZ to produce military vehicles domestically with a high localization rate, serving both civilian and military markets. Many of these vehicle become the chassis for many other heavy equipments of the Army.

Vietnam is also currently researching and manufacturing armored vehicles based on models that are already in use within its military. Three notable projects are the XCB-01 IFV and the XTC-02 APC which have entered pilot production, and the PTH-01 self-propelled howitzer which is in the prototype stage. All three projects are produced entirely domestically, except for the engines, which are imported from available sources. In addition, other projects to research and manufacture 8×8 armored personnel carriers such as the XTC-03 and the amphibious T-1 tank are also being researched and produced by the Vietnamese Ministry of Defense and factories under the General Department of Defence Industry.

Vietnam has also successfully conducted research and development projects to upgrade and modernize existing tanks and armored vehicles currently in service. A notable example is the T-54M upgrade project, which brings the T-54/55 tanks up to modern standards. This project builds upon the experience gained from the previously canceled T-55M3 program with Israel. Such upgrades have significantly improved the combat capabilities of older tank models. Vietnam has also carried out improvements to legacy armored vehicles in its inventory, such as the M113, V100, and BTR-60. These upgrades aim to extend the service life and enhance the performance of these older vehicles to meet modern operational requirements.

=== Ammunition ===
Vietnam has achieved comprehensive self-sufficiency in the production of ammunition for its armed forces, encompassing a wide range from small arms cartridges to various calibers of artillery shells. State-owned defense factories, such as Z113 and Z114, are equipped with modern infrastructure and skilled personnel, enabling the production of propellants and explosives for both military and civilian applications. These facilities have also been instrumental in manufacturing components for missile systems and other advanced weaponry. Many civilian company contractor can also produce mortar shell under contract with the Ministry of Defence, these shell later transported to VDI factory to fill with explosive.

In addition to conventional munitions, Vietnam has developed extended-range ammunition for multiple launch rocket systems (MLRS) and various rocket types, as well as grenades and munitions for anti-tank grenade launchers. A significant milestone has been the domestic production of advanced fuzes, including mechanical, electronic, and proximity fuzes for artillery shells, rockets, and aerial munitions.

In recent years, Vietnam has not only met domestic demands but also ventured into the international arms market. Vietnamese defense products have been exported to various regions, including Europe, the United States, and Southeast Asia with Indonesia is their biggest customer in the region.

=== Missiles and Heavy Artillery ===
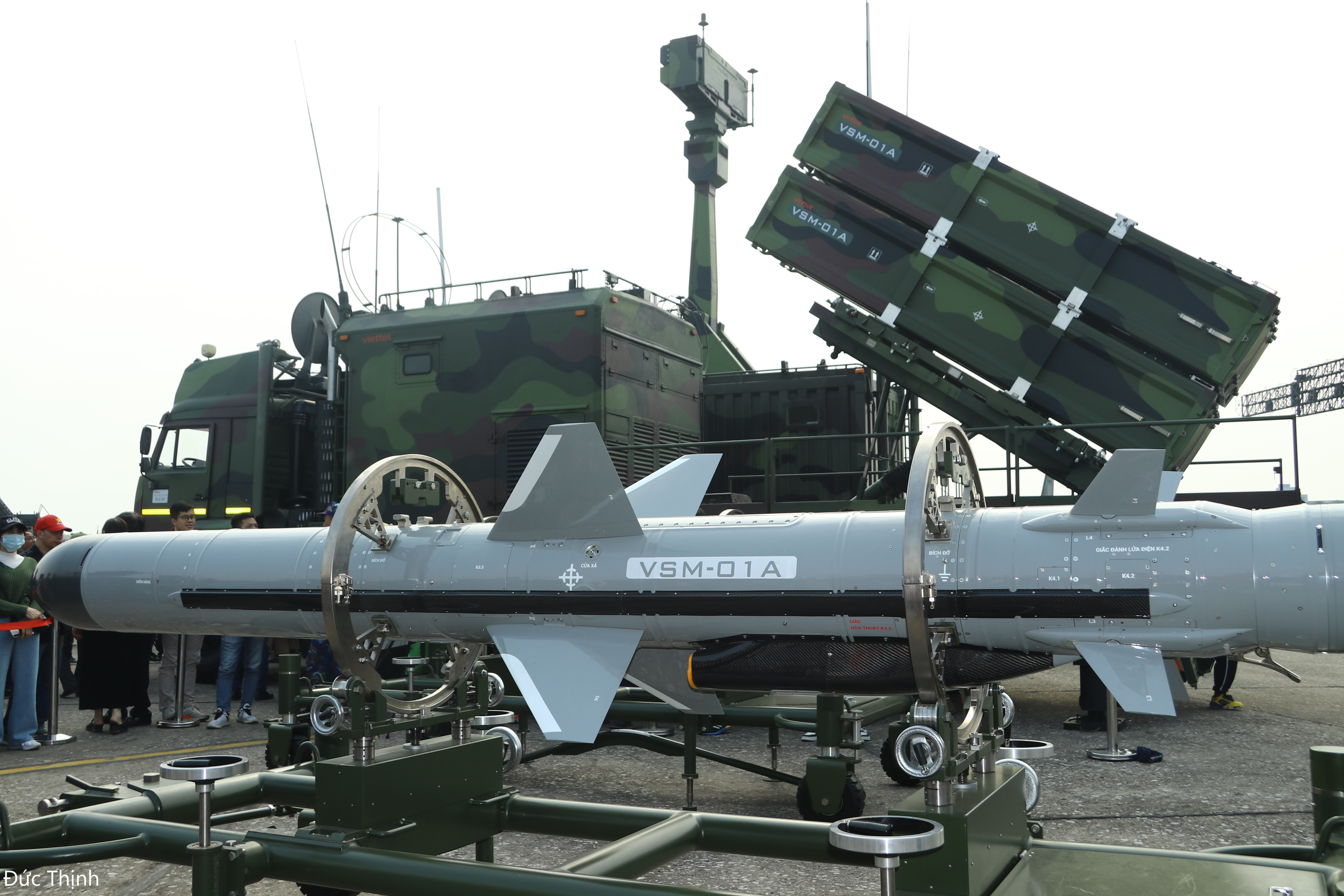
A VSM-01A missile being displayed next to a TEL of VCS-01 Trường Sơn and its VRS-MCX target designation radar.

One of Vietnam's key indigenous defense achievements is in missile technology. Building on Russian assistance, Vietnam acquired Kh-35 Uran-E anti-ship missiles in the 2000s and later mastered their maintenance under project KCT-15. This foundation enabled the development of the VCM-01, a domestically produced subsonic anti-ship missile revealed in 2019 by Viettel Aerospace Institute. While similar in design to the Russian Kh-35UE, the VCM-01 features extended range and modern electronics. Viettel partnered with other domestic entities, such as Shipyard Z189, to produce launchers and components. By 2024, a new coastal defense missile—reportedly named Sông Hồng—was unveiled. Vietnam also domestically produced Igla man-portable air-defense systems under transferred technology from Russia under the name TL-01 with the domestic rate of more than 90% .

Another highlight is the modernization of air defense missile systems such as the S-125, which were upgraded to the S-125VT standard by Viettel. The upgrade package includes compatibility with a newer, more modern surveillance radar, enhanced anti-jamming capability, and mechanization of components such as the SNR-125 fire-control radar and the missile reloading vehicle. A new missile model was also developed and upgraded, designated TLDK-35.

Aside from missiles, Vietnam's R&D establishments have worked on heavy artillery. The Ministry of Defense's Technical Institute reportedly developed a 130mm self-propelled artillery and 122mm self-propelled artillery in recent years, and Vietnamese factories have modernized older rocket artillery with extended-range munitions (for example, improving 122mm BM-21 Grad rockets). Vietnamese also has confirm they have enough capability to make all kinds of artillery component, including the cannon barrel. This mean the VPA have full capability to produce their own howitzer. In practice, Vietnam has implemented a military research program, resulting in 122 mm and 152 mm artillery cannon, as well as 125 mm tank guns, intended to support the development of self-propelled artillery based on the 2S1 and future amphibious tanks.

=== Naval Shipbuilding ===
Vietnam has made significant progress in naval shipbuilding by combining licensed foreign designs with indigenous development. Nowadays, Vietnam has been able to build a range of ship from supply ship, light to heavy landing craft, submarine rescue vessel and all kinds of patrol vessel. A key example is the Molniya-class fast attack craft, first imported from Russia in 2007 and later produced domestically at Ba Son Shipbuilding Corporation following a technology transfer. By 2016, Vietnam had built six Molniya-class ships, each armed with Kh-35 missiles, marking a major milestone in naval modernization.

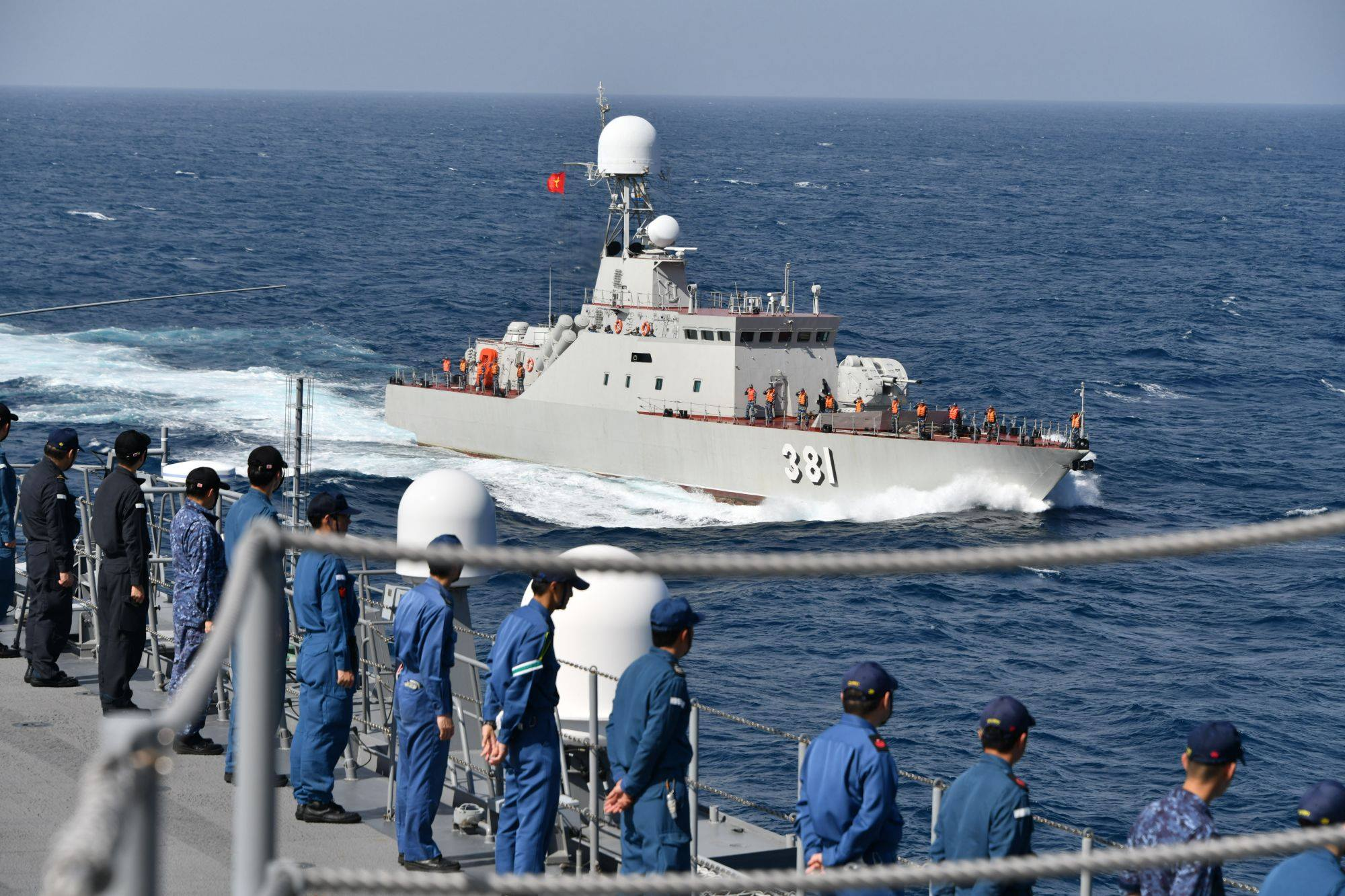
The one and only BPS-500-class missile boat of the Vietnam People's Navy

In parallel, Vietnam developed its own designs, such as the TT-400TP gunboat and large offshore patrol vessels built at shipyards like Z189 and Hong Ha. Z189 also produced Vietnam's first submarine rescue vessel in 2018 and another unit in 2025. These projects helped local engineers master complex shipbuilding skills, including hull construction, propulsion systems, and weapons integration. Additionally, Vietnam completed at least one prototype of the BPS-500 missile corvette around 2001. While the BPS-500 design did not go into mass production due to some shortcomings, it provided valuable lessons that informed later projects. Another notable project is TN-75 submarine. It is a midget submarine based on North Korea Yugo-class submarine. Equipped with light torpedo and modern electronic, its mission is to support frogmen and unconventional mission. Another notable development is that Vietnam has created its own new unmanned surface vehicle, equipped with a target acquisition system, likely designed to provide precise guidance in the event of signal loss, and featuring a satellite dish for long-range control.

Modern facilities such as the expanded Z189 and Song Thu shipyard now support the production of a wide range of naval vessels, from missile boats to logistic support ships. This progress reflects Vietnam's long-term strategy of defense self-reliance while selectively incorporating foreign expertise.

=== Unmanned aerial vehicle ===
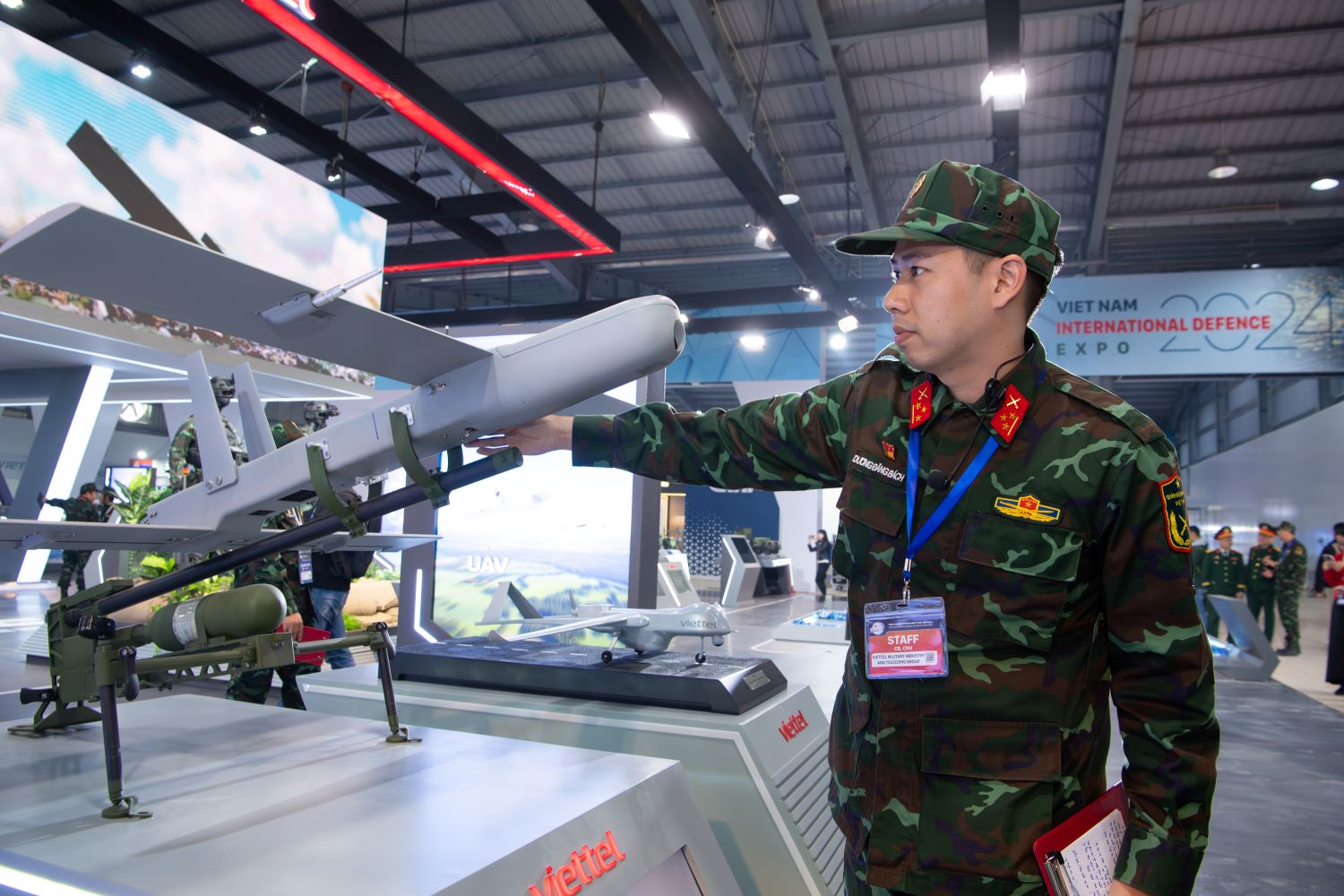
VU-C2 lotering munition

Vietnam's work on unmanned aerial vehicles began modestly but has accelerated in the 21st century. Early efforts in the 1990s involved simple target drones for air defense practice. Since 2001, however, Vietnamese institutions started developing more modern UAVs, both for civilian and military purposes. By the 2010s, multiple organizations – from the state-run Vietnam Aerospace Association (VASA) to military-run companies like Viettel High-Tech – were designing and testing UAV prototypes. Most of these are short to medium-range reconnaissance drones equipped with cameras and sensors for surveillance.

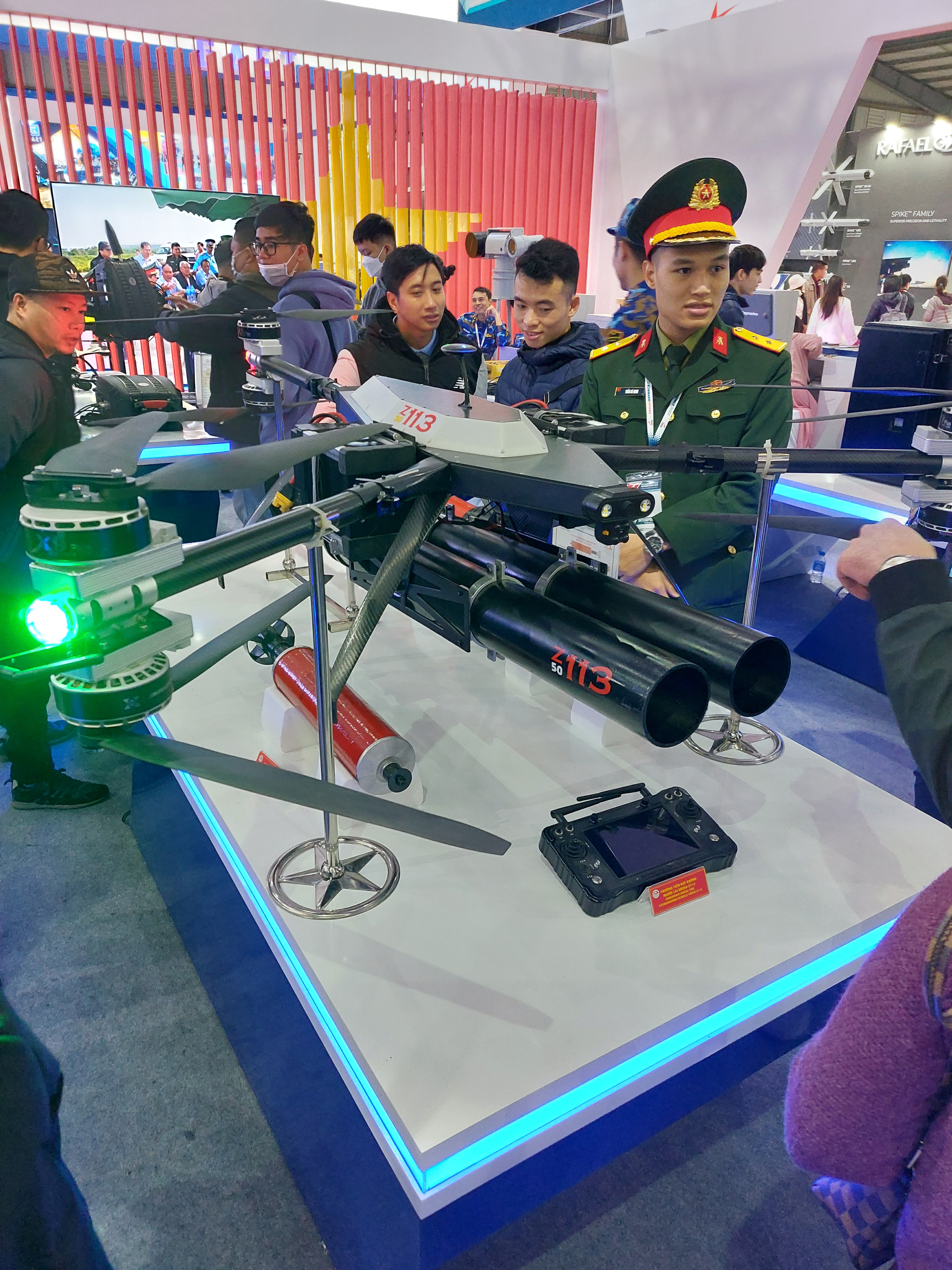
A firefight UAV of Z113, able to carry rocket launcher

International collaboration also played a role in UAV development. By 2015–2016, Viettel and the Ministry of Defense unveiled a hefty long-endurance UAV prototype (reportedly named HS-6L), with a 22-meter wingspan and intended endurance of up to 35 hours. This project was said to have benefitted from technical support by Belarus, showing again Vietnam's approach of obtaining foreign know-how to bootstrap local projects. While it's unclear if the HS-6L entered service, it demonstrated Vietnam's ambition to produce MALE (medium-altitude long-endurance) drones. In September 2020, Viettel displayed a mock-up of a new indigenous MALE UAV design, signaling ongoing R&D in this field. In September 2025, Viettel officially launched their complete MALE UAV, with a maximum payload of 500 kg and a flight time of up to 24 hours.

Vietnam currently possesses the capability to produce a wide range of unmanned aerial vehicles (UAVs) suited to modern battlefield demands. In the field of reconnaissance, notable domestically developed models include the RAV-80, VU-QL1, VU-R50, and VU-R70, produced by Viettel and various Air Force-affiliated research institutes. In addition, Vietnam has made progress in loitering munitions (suicide drones), with systems such as the VU-C2 launched from mobile canisters, as well as the BXL-01 and QXL-01 developed by Factory Z131. Factory Z113 has also introduced several FPV (first-person view) drones for short-range tactical operations like loitering or scouting.

=== Radar and Electronics Development ===
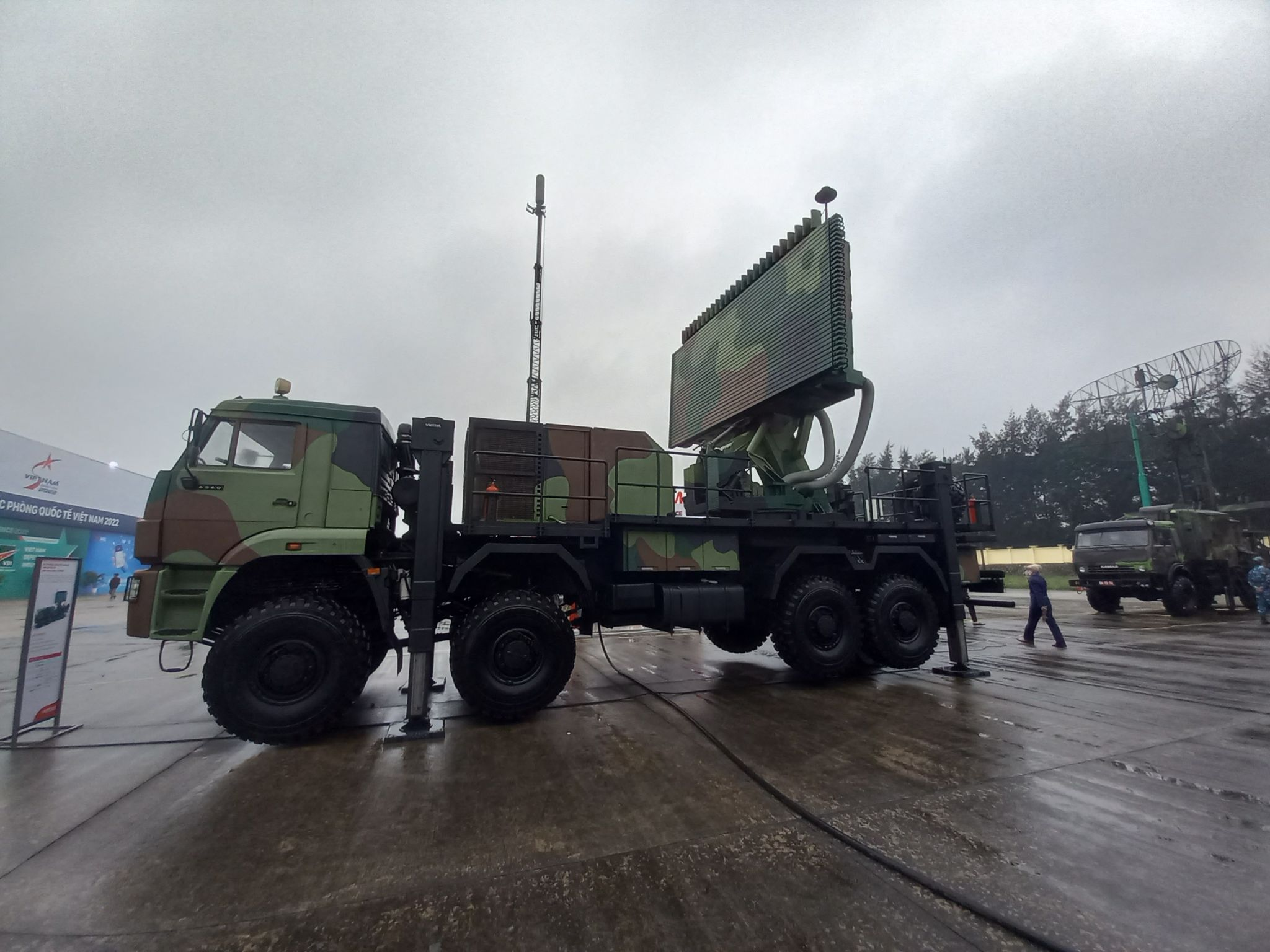
Viettel High Tech VRS-MRS 3D S-band air-surveillance radar at 2022 Vietnam Defence Expo

Since the 2000s, upgrading and localizing radar and electronic systems has been a key focus of Vietnam's defense industry. To replace aging Soviet-era equipment, Vietnam has developed and modernized several radar platforms with foreign assistance. Notable achievements include the VRS-2DM low-altitude surveillance radar, co-developed by Viettel and Belarus based on the P-19 “Flat Face”, and the RV-series radars derived from the Vostok-E platform.

Vietnam also developed the P-18M radar using technology from the Czech Republic, capable of detecting stealth targets up to 250 km away. In addition, Viettel has successfully developed the VRS-CSX coastal surveillance radar, based on the French Coast Watch 100 radar system. Most recently, they unveiled an X-band AESA fire-control radar designed for the automated 57mm anti-aircraft gun system, as well as a guidance radar developed for the VCS-01 coastal defense missile system.

Beyond radar, Vietnam's electronic warfare capabilities also include a range of systems, from handheld devices such as CA-18GL, VCU/3P, and CAV-14, to larger counter-UAV platforms like C-UAS, V-EMP/S, VCUS/C, and VCUS/E. In the field of electronic surveillance, Vietnam has successfully developed the V-ELINT 18 system, based on the Czech VERA-NG passive surveillance radar, and has officially deployed it for operational use. Vietnam has also upgraded missile guidance and fire-control radars Vietnam has domestically produced electronic components and guidance systems for legacy Soviet-era surface-to-air missiles such as the S-75 and S-125, thereby extending their operational lifespan and ensuring continued effectiveness.

=== Maintenance of equipment ===
Vietnam currently possesses comprehensive capabilities for routine maintenance and life-extension of all categories of heavy military equipment. This includes advanced expertise in maintaining submarines, fighter jets, helicopters, and performing structural life-extension upgrades on platforms such as the Mi-8 and Su-30. A notable example is Factory A32 under the Air and Air Defense Force, which specializes in service-life extension for Su-30MK2 aircraft. In addition, Vietnamese defense factories have also provided maintenance services for Mi-17 helicopters currently operated by the Indonesian Air Force, reflecting growing regional trust in Vietnam's defense maintenance sector.

== Manufacturers ==
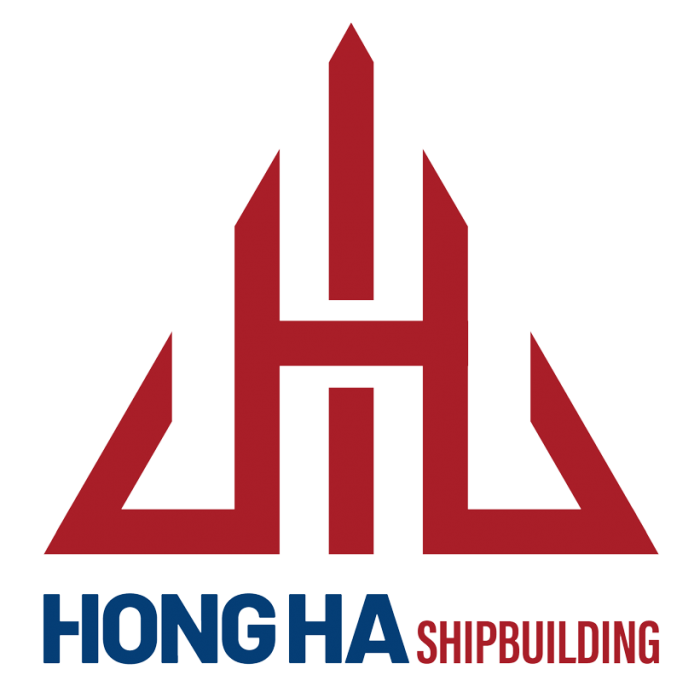
Logo of Z173 Shipyard

Currently, the General Department of Defence Industry serves as the central governing body for all weapon manufacturing factories of the Vietnam People's Army. However, the factories under its management maintain autonomy in conducting research and development of domestically produced weapon systems. The factories and research units of the General Department and the military can also cooperate in research and production, forming a unified system of manufacturing and research.

- Z111 Factory – Produces light infantry weapons.
- Z113 Factory – Specializes in wide range of ammunition from artillery to light infantry weapons, dual-purpose explosive and UAV.
- Z114 Factory – Manufactures wide range of ammunition from artillery to light infantry weapons and also dual-purpose explosive.
- Z115 Factory – Produces explosive ordinance and artillery shell.
- Z117 Factory – Known for producing body armor and ballistic plate.
- Z121 Factory – Produces explosives and signal pyrotechnics, most well known for fireworks.
- Z125 Factory - Specializes in large caliber weapon like grenade launcher, recoilless rifle, anti-tank weapon and artillery components.
- Z127 Factory - Specializes in metallurgy as material for others factory. Also produces alloys, mortar and antitank ammunition.
- Z129 Factory – Specializes in precise mechanic, famous for artillery fuse.
- Z131 Factory – Specializes in artillery, UAV, and anti-tank ammunition, MANPADS and ATGM.
- Z143 factory - Mostly focus in electric wire and other electrical equipment.
- Z173 Shipyard (Hong Ha Shipbuilding Company) – Builds naval vessels and patrol boats.
- Z175 Factory – Produces all kinds of rubber tire and rubber components.
- Z176 Factory – Manufactures parts, accessories, and light weapons. Also produces camouflage.
- Z181 Factory – Known for artillery shell and light weapon ammunition. Also produces semiconductors.
- Z183 factory - Specializes high-tech equipment such as night vision sights, electro-optical preamplifier and artillery fuzes.
- Z189 Shipyard - Build naval vessels including patrol ships, submarine rescuer,...
- Z195 Factory – Engaged produce explosives and chemical.
- Z199 Factory – Produces optical and precision devices.

In addition, the production and upgrading of specialized equipment are also carried out at factories under the General Department of Logistics and Technology, military services, arms branches, army corps, and military regions as well as many factory of Viettel.
