= XTC-03 =

- Type: Armored personnel carrier
- Place of origin: Vietnam

Production history
- Designer: Vietnam Defence Industry; Institute of Active Mechanics; Military Technical Academy
- Designed: 2025–present
- Manufacturer: Z111 Factory (prototype); Z179 Factory

Specifications
- Mass: 16 tonnes (16 long tons; 18 short tons) (full load); 15 tonnes (15 long tons; 17 short tons) (curb weight)
- Length: 7.580 metres (24.87 ft)
- Width: 2,985 metres (9,793 ft)
- Height: 2.725 metres (8.94 ft)
- Crew: 3
- Passengers: 8
- Armor: Qualified standard: STANAG 4569 Level 2 (all-around); STANAG 4569 Level 3 (turret front); STANAG 4569 Level 4 (hull front)
- Main armament: 30 mm 2A42 autocannon
- Secondary armament: 7.62 mm PK coaxial machine gun
- Engine: KAMAZ 689.311-360 V8 4-stroke turbocharged diesel engine 351 horsepower (262 kW)
- Suspension: 8×8 wheeled
- Ground clearance: >475 mm
- Maximum speed: 85 km/h (road); 10 km/h (water)

The XTC-03 (abbreviated from Xe thiết giáp chở quân, lit. 'Armored Personnel Carrier') is an amphibious armored personnel carrier developed for the People's Army of Vietnam. The vehicle was designed and manufactured by units under the General Department of Defense Industry, the Institute of Active Mechanics (General Department of Logistics), the Military Technical Academy, and the Z111 Factory. It is the first 8×8 wheeled armored personnel carrier to be domestically researched and produced by Vietnam.

== Design ==
=== Mobility ===
While some reports suggest the vehicle's design was inspired by the Ukrainian BTR-4, it is highly probable that the prototype's chassis is based on the BTR-80 (specifically the GAZ-59037A variant currently in Vietnamese service). However, unlike the BTR-80, which has a rear-mounted engine, or the BTR-4, which places the engine in the middle, the XTC-03 features an engine compartment located at the front-right of the hull, adjacent to the driver's position. This layout reflects a design language similar to modern Western APCs.

The prototype is powered by a KAMAZ 689.311-360 V8 four-stroke turbocharged diesel engine, producing a maximum of 351 horsepower (262 kW). The exhaust system is positioned on the right side of the hull, and the 5-speed gearbox is located in the center of the vehicle. This configuration allows for the top speed of 85 km/h on land. While the rear is equipped with two pump-jets, allowing the vehicle to swim at a speed of 10 km/h forward and 3–5 km/h in reverse.

=== Armament ===
The vehicle is equipped with a turret armed with a 30 mm 2A42 autocannon as its primary weapon. It is supplemented by a 7.62 mm PK coaxial machine gun. Additionally, the hull features firing ports on both sides, allowing soldiers to engage targets with individual weapons from within the vehicle.

Regarding electronic systems, the turret is fitted with an independent panoramic sight for the commander. This system, based on publicly released images, provides the commander with a comprehensive 360-degree view of the battlefield.

=== Protection ===
The XTC-03 features hardened steel armor that meets STANAG 4569 Level 4 for the hull front, Level 3 for the turret front, and Level 2 for the rest of the vehicle. This armor provides baseline protection against 14.5×114mm rounds at the front, and all-around protection against 7.62×39 mm rounds or 155 mm artillery fragments exploding at a distance of 30m. The floor is designed to withstand mines with an explosive yield of 6 kg TNT. Some images also suggest the possibility of installing modular ceramic armor for enhanced protection.

In combat configuration, the vehicle carries 8 soldiers seated on both sides of the troop compartment. The crew includes a driver seated next to the engine compartment, a commander seated behind the driver, and a gunner positioned within the turret. Access is provided through a rear door, with four roof hatches available for entry and exit.

Beyond physical armor, the prototype is equipped with a laser warning receiver similar to those found on the XCB-01 and XTC-02 models. This system allows for the detection of incoming laser sources, such as those from anti-tank missiles. It is paired with 8 smoke grenade launchers to obscure the vehicle from enemy sights and targeting devices. The vehicle is also fully equipped with NBC (Nuclear, Biological, Chemical) protection systems, an automatic fire suppression system, and automated protection activation for the crew.

== History ==
The XTC-03 prototype was first mentioned during a meeting between Senior Lieutenant General Phạm Hoài Nam and the General Department of Defense Industry. During this meeting, Z179 Factory was tasked with manufacturing a prototype by March 31, 2026. The mission was later reassigned to Z111 Factory.

On May 5, 2026, Senior Lieutenant General Pham Hoai Nam inspected the progress of the research, design, and manufacturing of the XTC-03 armored personnel carrier. By this time, the vehicle had been fully assembled and had undergone engine startup, idling tests, and functional testing of several onboard systems. During the inspection, the General tasked the factory with continuing to finalize, test, and evaluate the model before May 31, 2026, to ensure it is ready for display at the Vietnam International Defense Expo 2026.

== See also ==
- BTR-80
- BTR-4
- XCB-01
- XTC-02
