= XTC-02 =

2025 Vietnamese amphibious wheeled armored personnel carrier

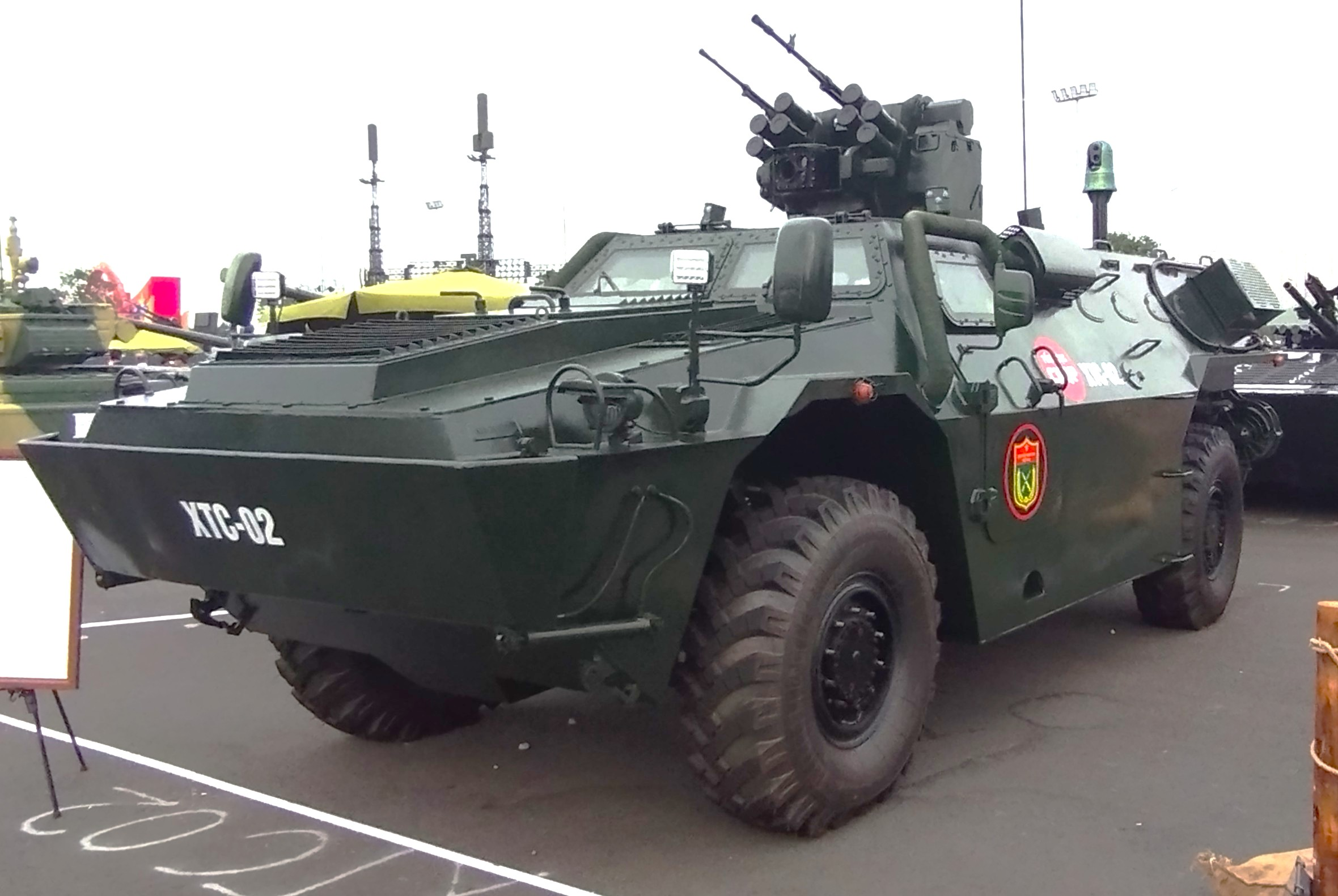
- XTC-02
- Type: Armored personnel carrier Armoured reconnaissance
- Place of origin: Vietnam

Service history
- Used by: People's Army of Vietnam

Production history
- Designer: Vietnam Defence Industry
- Designed: 2022–2024
- Developed from: XTC-01
- Produced: From 2025
- No. built: 10 (2025)

Specifications
- Mass: 12.7 metric tons
- Length: 7.185 metres (23.57 ft)
- Width: 2.760 metres (9.06 ft)
- Height: 2.225 metres (7.30 ft)
- Crew: 3
- Passengers: 9
- Armor: Steel armour providing protection against 7.62×39 mm, equal to STANAG 4569 Level 3
- Main armament: 12.7 mm NSV/SCX-12,7V HMG on a remote controlled weapon station
- Secondary armament: 7.62 mm coaxial PKT machine gun
- Transmission: 9-forward/1-reverse manual transmission
- Suspension: 4×4 independent suspension
- Ground clearance: 400 millimetres (16 in)
- Operational range: 800 kilometres (500 mi)
- Maximum speed: 95 kilometres per hour (59 mph) driving on road surface 12 kilometres per hour (7.5 mph) swimming forward

XTC-02 (prefix XTC stands for Xe thiết giáp chở quân, 'Armored personnel carrier - APC') is an amphibious wheeled armored personnel carrier (APC) and reconnaissance vehicle developed and manufactured by Vietnam’s General Department of Defence Industry. It is designed to provide infantry mobility, troop transport, and close fire support in the riverine and marshland environments characteristic of Vietnam’s terrain. The vehicle first appeared publicly via leaked images in 2022, and was widely displayed and paraded during the A80 celebrations on September 2, 2025.

== Development ==
In 2022, the first images of the XTC-02 prototype surfaced on Vietnamese defense forums and social media and were subsequently collated by outlets such as Army Recognition. At that stage the vehicle was still an early demonstrator: public disclosures focused on its amphibious 4×4 layout and troop-carrying role, while detailed information on the weapons fit, protection level, and onboard electronics remained scarce. This prototype features higher ground clearance for emphasized mine protection.

Over the next two years, the platform appears to have undergone iterative testing and refinement—centered on hull sealing for riverine operations, internal layout for rapid troop egress, and options for a roof-mounted weapon station. By 2025, the General Department of Defence Industry presented the XTC-02 openly in Hanoi during A80 rehearsals and the September 2 national celebrations. This marked the vehicle’s first broad public debut, with domestic media releasing initial key technical-tactical figures and imagery of operational configurations. The showcase positioned the XTC-02 as part of Vietnam’s broader push to localize armored mobility solutions tailored to the country’s river-delta and marshland terrain, while signaling a pathway for future variants—such as command, medical, or remote weapon station–equipped versions—based on a common amphibious chassis.

== Design ==
=== Mobility ===
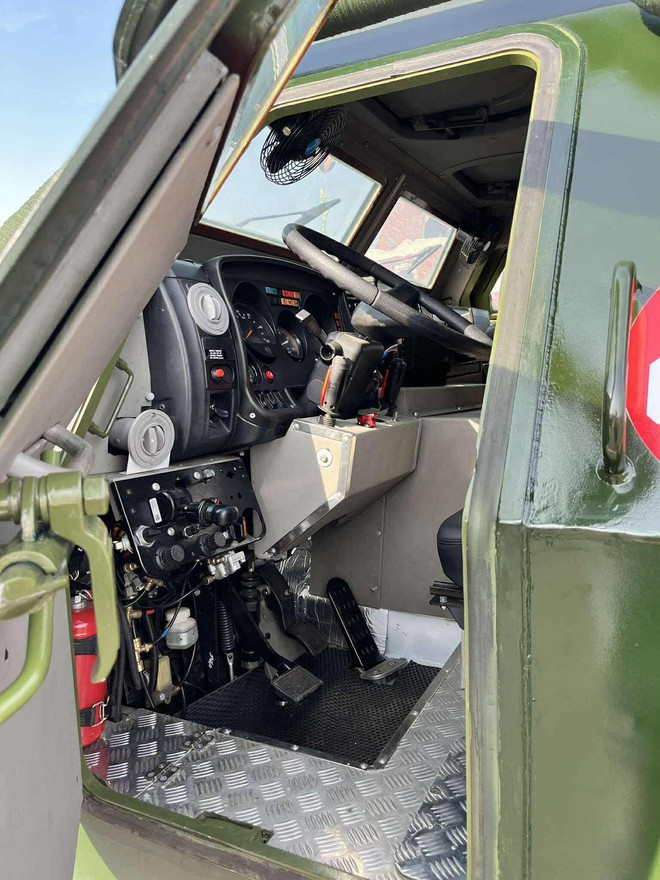
Front compartment of XTC-02

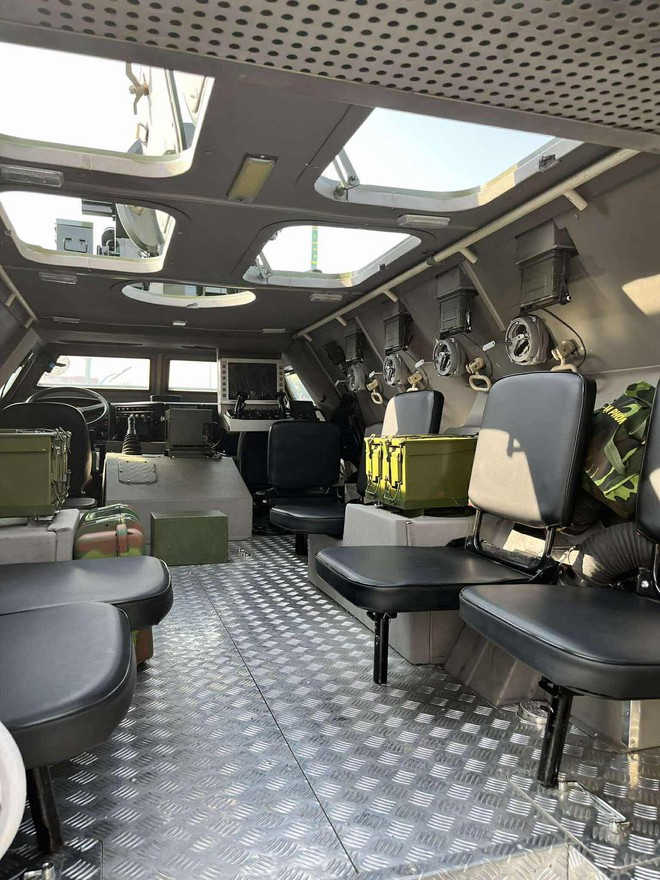
Personnel-carrying compartment

The XTC-02 employs a 4×4 drivetrain with independent suspension and a front-mounted engine, reaching a top speed of about 95 km/h on paved roads. Its 9-forward/1-reverse manual transmission provides a broader usable gear range for both advance and reverse maneuvers.

Amphibious mobility is enabled by twin rear waterjet-propulsion units working with a bow wave-deflector, while the boat-shaped, beveled front hull improves buoyancy and wave handling. This help the vehicle can reach top speed of 12km/h while swimming. In obstacle performance, the vehicle can climb 31°, hold a 25° side slope, cross 0.8 m trenches, and negotiate 0.4 m vertical steps, meeting the demands of mixed terrain operations.

=== Protection ===
The vehicle is fitted with steel armor rated to stop 7.62×54mmR armor-piercing rounds across the hull, with ballistic glass offering comparable protection. This implies a protection level roughly comparable to STANAG 4569 Level 3, which means it can provide infantry with basic protection against shrapnel and light infantry weapons. The XTC-02 have a flat hull to increase contact with water surfaces for stability during amphibious crossing.

Access to the vehicle is straightforward with two front doors for the driver and commander, a rear door for quick troop embarkation and disembarkation, and a roof hatch for observation and machine-gun manual operation (if needed). Two additional hatch also place above driver and commander seat.

As with the XCB-01, it is equipped with an NBC (nuclear, biological, chemical) detection with a air condition system and protection suite, a laser warning receiver (LWR) linked to smoke grenade launchers for screening when targeted, and an automatic fire-suppression system to enhance crew and troop survivability.

=== Firepower ===
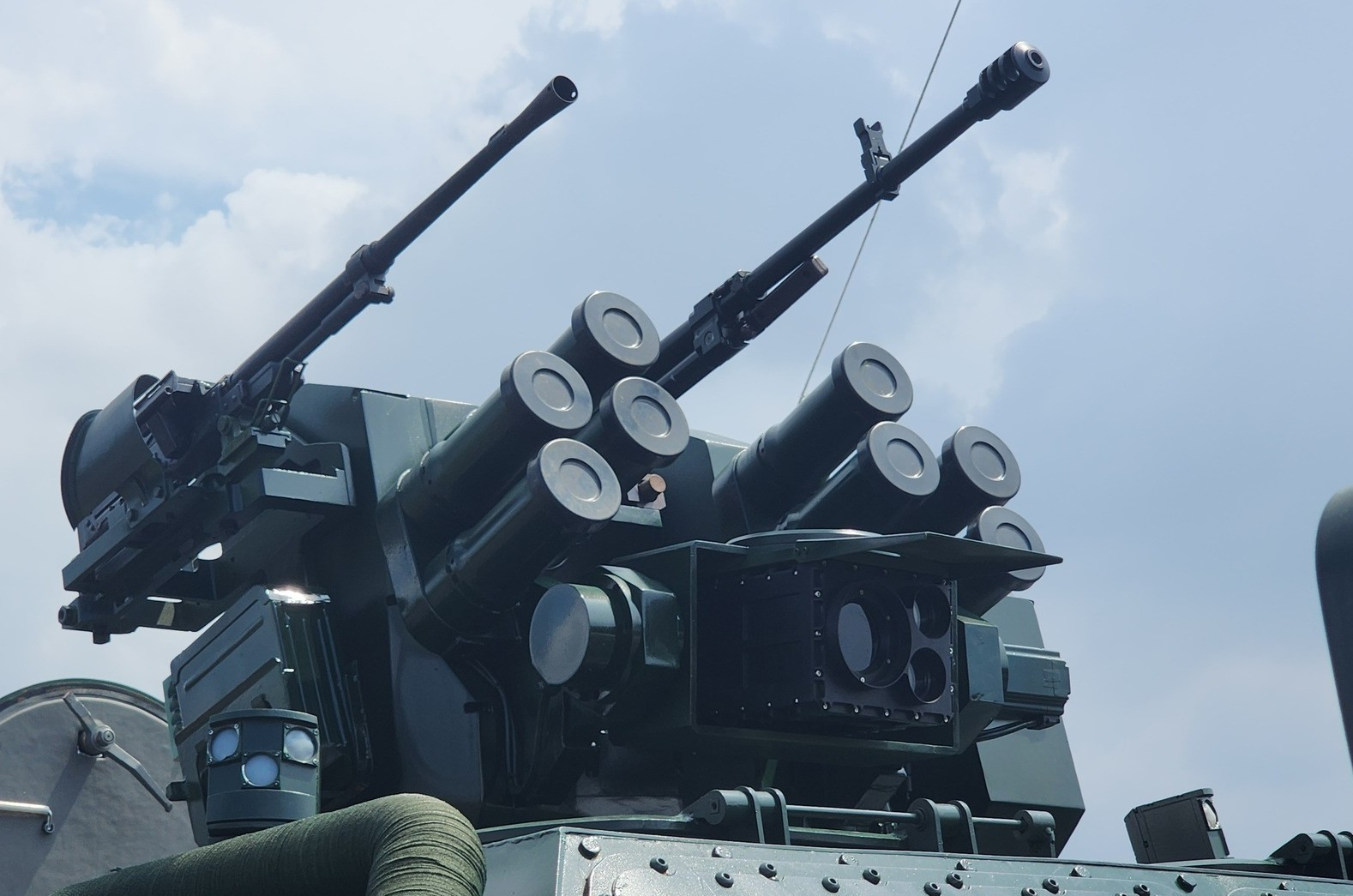
Weapon station.

The vehicle’s primary armament is a self-stabilizing fire control system mounting a 12.7 mm NSV and a 7.62 mm PKT, which are both locally manufactured by Z111 Factory. It can track targets, and fire while moving, day and night. A dedicated electro-optical sighting unit beneath the gun cluster supports all aiming and firing functions (day/night channels, ranging, etc.). Elevation range of the turret is −13° to +65°, full 360° turret traverse with capable of target tracking at vehicle speeds up to 30 km/h, and accurate fire on the move up to 20 km/h. If the system malfunctions, the turret can be operated manually. The turret also incorporates eight smoke-grenade launchers for screening.

In addition, soldiers in the troop compartment can use assault rifles and general-purpose machine guns to fire outwards through the battlements on both sides of the vehicle via firing ports.

=== Electronic ===
XTC-02 is equipped with VRU-812S radio produced by Viettel, with an ultra-shortwave (VHF) radio transceiver employing frequency-hopping technology, this is a tactical-level communications set. It supports fixed-frequency voice, fixed-frequency encrypted voice, frequency-hopping voice, and timely, efficient data transmission. The set can form networks and maintain reliable communications under strong electromagnetic interference. An RS-232 interface allows connection to computers and other peripherals for data-transfer modes. Typical communication range is 6–10 km for man-portable use and up to 20 km when vehicle-mounted.

The vehicle also equipped with a Multi-Spectral Surveillance System. It was mounted on an extendable mast at back of the vehicle and able to reconnaissance and target tracking.

== Users ==
- People's Army of Vietnam
