= XCB-01 =

2022 Vietnamese infantry fighting vehicle

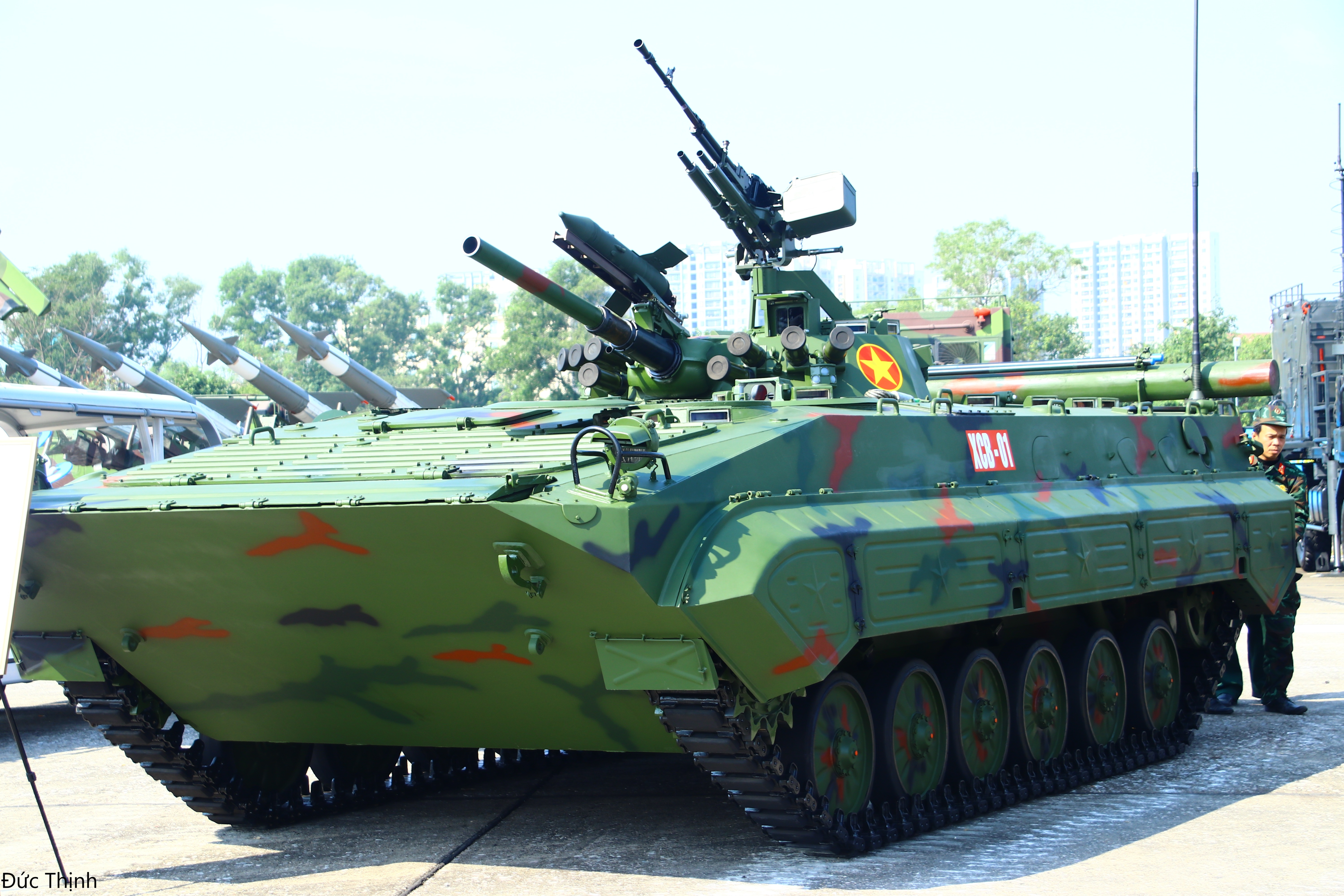
- 2024 serial production
- Type: Infantry fighting vehicle
- Place of origin: Vietnam

Service history
- Used by: People's Army of Vietnam

Production history
- Designer: Vietnam Defence Industry
- Designed: 2022-2024
- Manufacturer: Z189 Shipyard
- Developed from: (Soviet Union) BMP-1
- Produced: From 2024

Specifications
- Mass: 14.63 metric tons
- Length: 6.950 metres (22.80 ft)
- Width: 3.250 metres (10.66 ft)
- Height: 2.140 metres (7.02 ft)
- Crew: 3
- Passengers: 8
- Armor: Front armor: resisting 12.7mm API at more than 100m The rest: STANAG 4569 Level 3
- Main armament: HT-73 weapon station with 73mm P-73 smoothbore gun
- Secondary armament: 12.7mm NSV machine gun; 7.62mm PKT machine gun; 9M14 Malyutka or CTVN-18 ATGM
- Engine: Turbocharged UTD-20 V6 4-stroke 338 horsepower (252 kW)
- Ground clearance: 370 millimetres (15 in)
- Operational range: 350–500 kilometres (220–310 mi)
- Maximum speed: 65 kilometres per hour (40 mph) driving on road surface 7 kilometres per hour (4.3 mph) swimming forward

XCB-01 (prefix XCB stands for Xe Chiến đấu Bộ binh, 'Infantry Fighting Vehicle - IFV') is a Vietnamese infantry fighting vehicle developed by Vietnam Defence Industry and assembled by Z189 Company. First launched in 2022, it is the first tracked armored vehicle researched and manufactured domestically by Vietnam. The vehicle is largely based on the old Soviet BMP-1, but with revised hull designs and better defensive and offensive capabilities.

== Features ==
=== Maneuverability ===
Some of the first prototype were equipped with a Doosan DL08 engine. Due to its larger size, the engine bay have extend upward. This led to the limitation of shooting angle of the main cannon. This configuration was later abandoned.

Thanks for its upgraded engine, XCB-01 has a slightly-higher power-to-mass ratio nearly equivalent to the BMP-1 vehicle (23.1 hp/ton compared to 22.7 hp/ton). The XCB-01's suspension system is virtually the same as the BMP-1 with 6 drive wheels. Therefore, its maneuverability is supposedly comparable, if not better, to the BMP-1, despite featuring a bigger and heavier platform. The vehicle reaches a speed of about 65 km/h on flat roads and 45 km/h on bad terrain. The vehicle is capable of climbing steep slopes 0.7 m high, crossing ditches 2.5 m wide, slopes up to 30 degrees and can swim with speed of 7 km/h without prior preparation.

=== Protection ===
The vehicle can resist armor-piercing 12.7mm bullets on the front of the vehicle's body. The remaining sides of the vehicle are bulletproof according to STANAG 4569 level 3 standards.

In addition to armor, the vehicle is also equipped with a 3-agent biological-chemical-radiological (NBC) protection system and a laser warning receiver (LWR), which can be used to activate smoke grenades in case the vehicle is targeted, or to obstruct enemies' observation.

=== Firepower ===
The vehicle is equipped with weapons similar to the BMP-1. The main gun is the P-73-01 (HT-73-01), itself being a Vietnamese copy and modernization of the 2A28 smoothbore gun, capable of destroying enemy vehicles, fortifications and infantry at a distance of up to 700 m. Compared to the original BMP-1, the XCB-01 is more capable of detecting targets thanks to it being equipped with the 1PN22VN1 multi-channel sighting system developed and manufactured by the Vietnamese Institute of Technology Application (Ministry of Science and Technology) . This new generation multi-channel sight includes 4 channels: day channel, laser rangefinder channel, infrared thermal imaging channel and CCD camera, providing the ability to detect targets at distances up to 2,000 m in all weather conditions. The turret is then produced and assembly at Z125 Factory.

For secondary weapons, the vehicle is equipped with a 7.62 mm PKT coaxial machine gun and a 12.7 mm NSV-type anti-aircraft machine gun mounted on the roof. This is a unique characteristic of the XCB-01 vehicle, unlike any infantry fighting vehicle previously manufactured by the Soviet Union or Russia. Some leaked images also showed that a remote controlled weapon station can also be equipped. NSV and PKT machine guns are both locally manufactured by Z111 Factory.

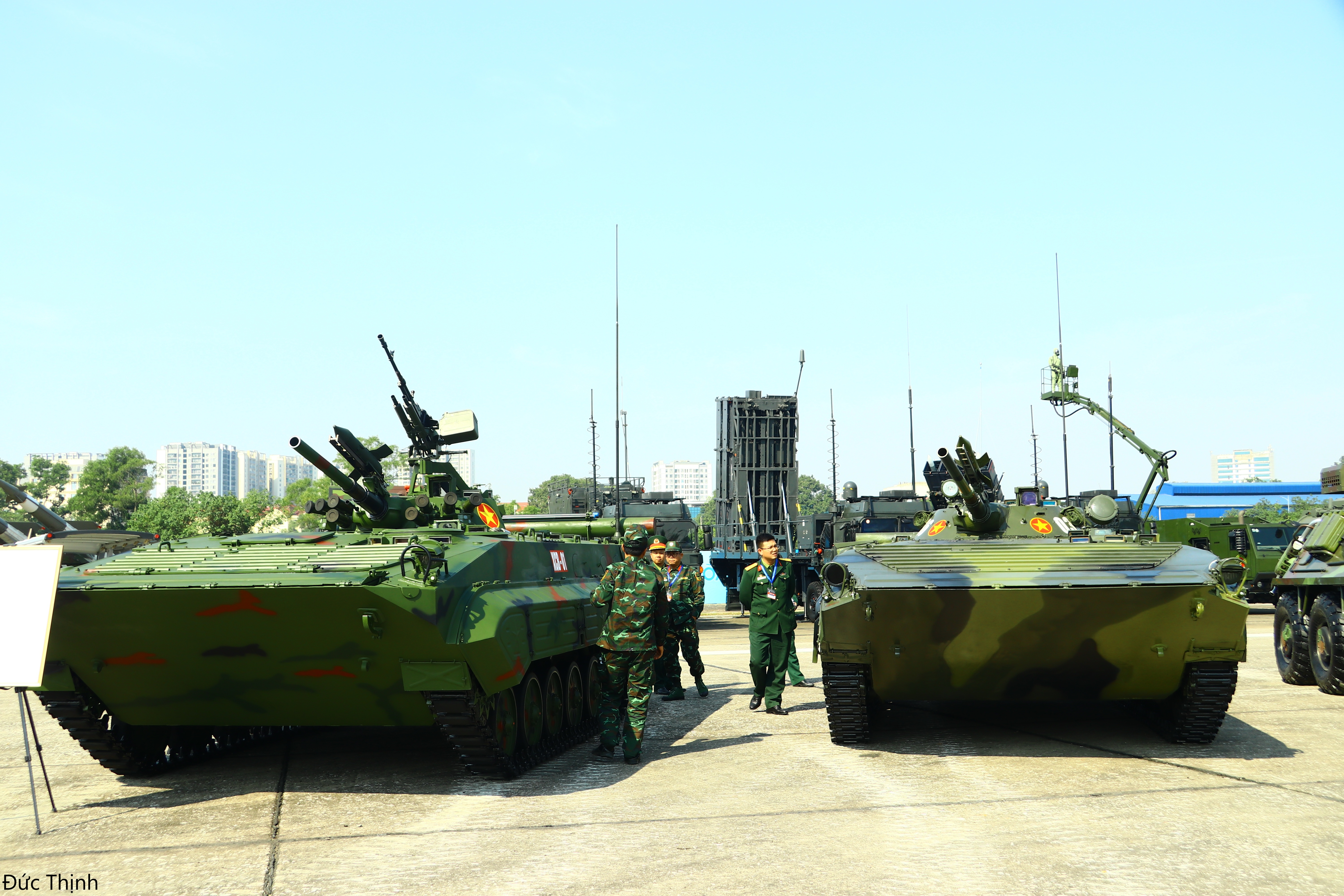
The XCB-01 standing next to a BMP-1, showing the Vietnamese vehicle's bigger size and slightly different hull design.

The vehicle's weapon systems is mounted on a welded polygonal turret instead of the truncated conical turret on the BMP-1. In addition, soldiers in the troop compartment can fire their assault rifles and machine guns outside through the use of firing ports on both sides of the vehicle.

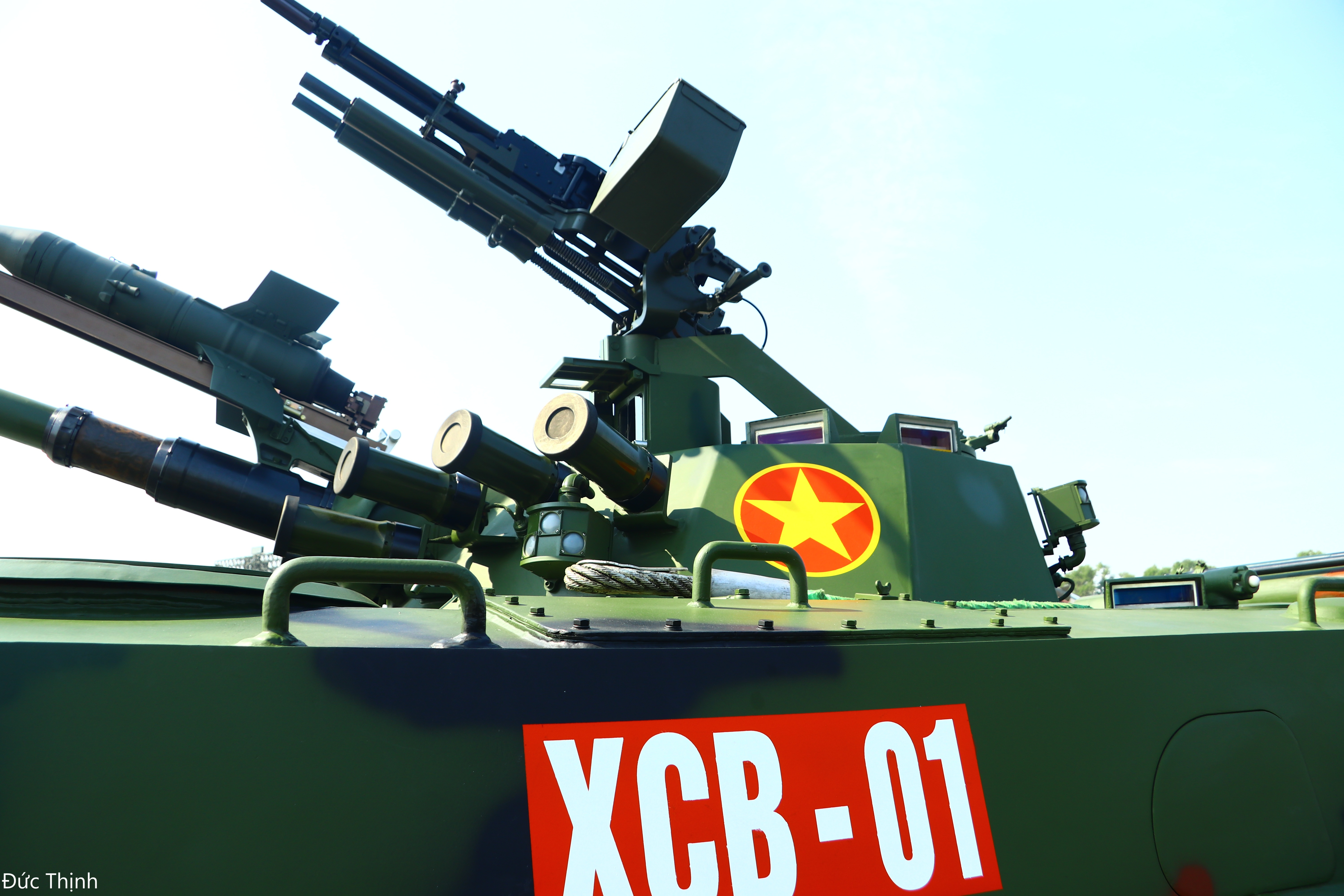
The HT-73-01 turret and weapon station

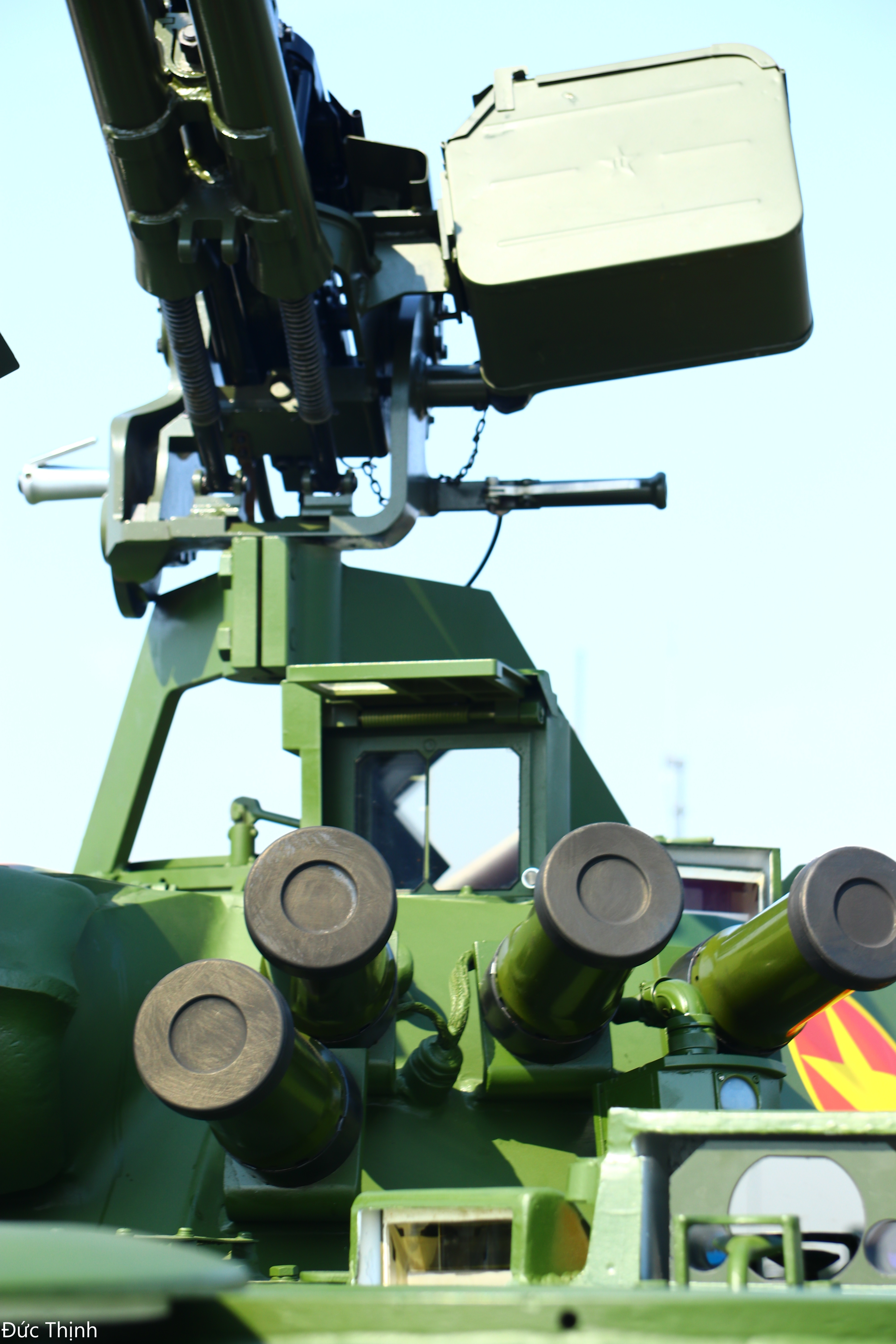
The gunner sight and smoke discharger of XCB-01

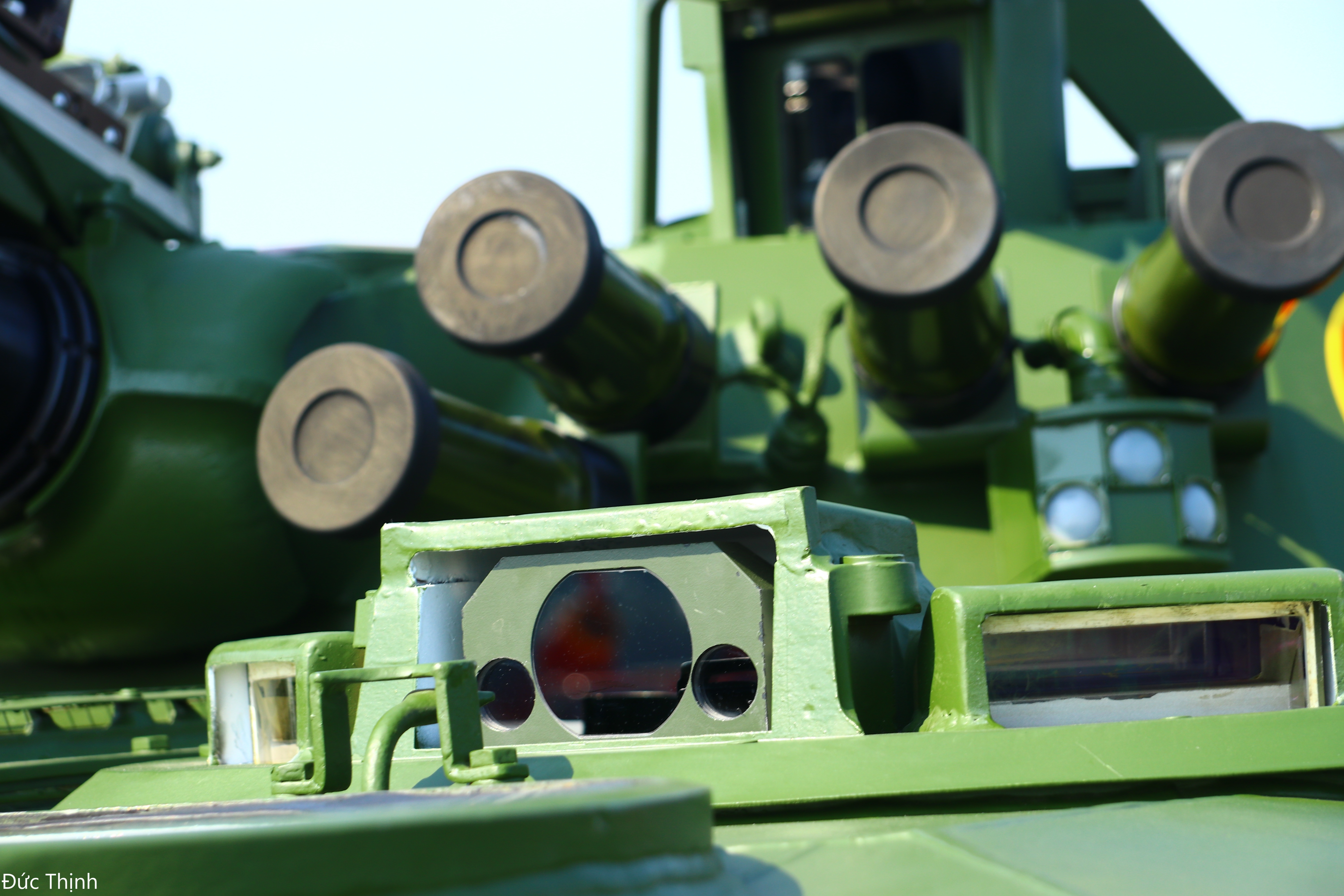
Commander sight with laser rangefinder on the XCB-01

== Operational history ==
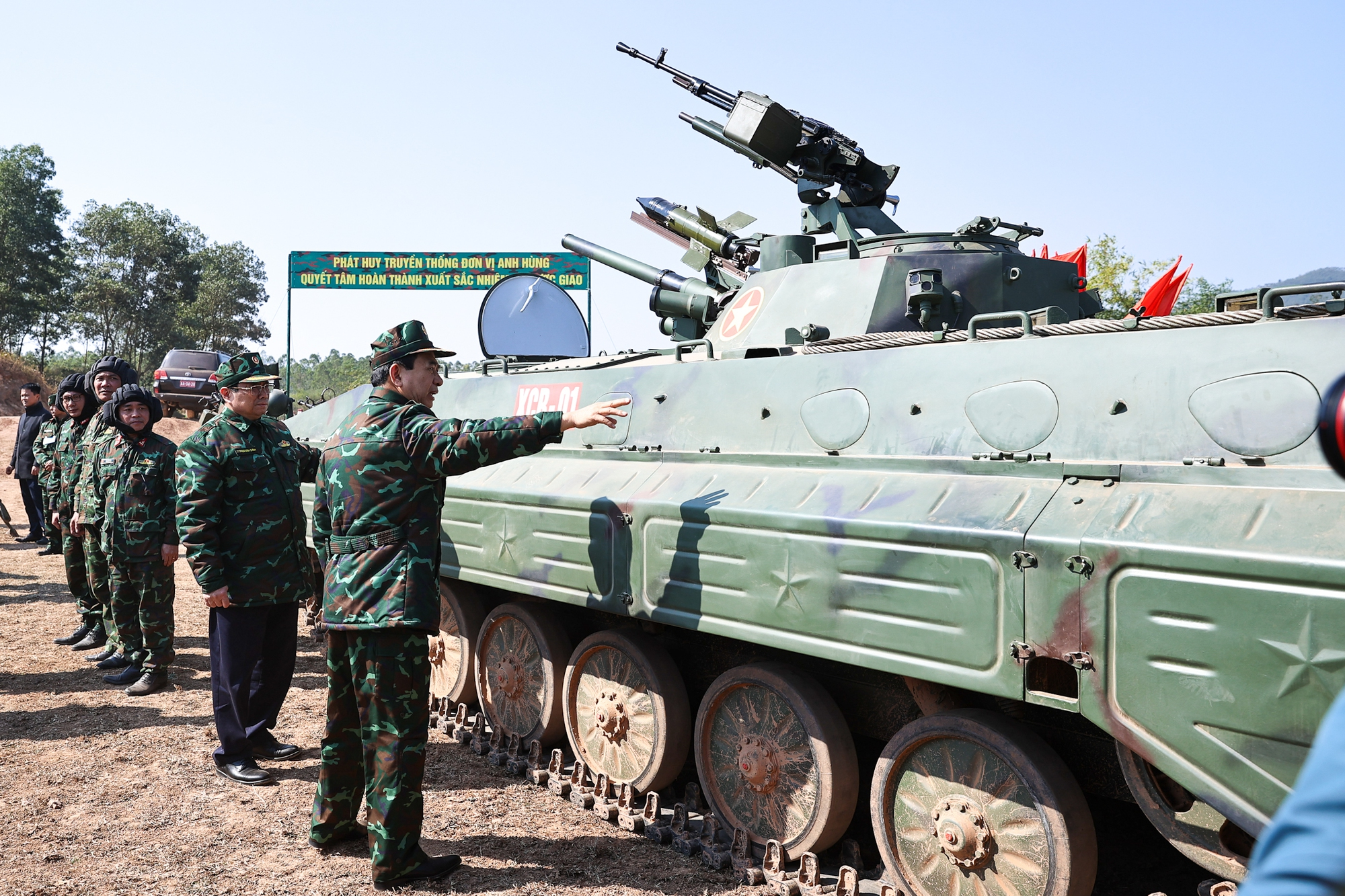
XCB-01 at the DT-23 exercise

The XCB-01 is said to have been displayed for the first time within the framework of the 30th ASEAN Armies Rifle Meet (AARM), held in November 2022 at the VPA Training Center in Mieu Mon, Hanoi. After that, images of the car testing its swimming ability were posted on Vietnamese social networks. In 2023, the XCB-01 vehicle appeared in a live-fire exercise codenamed "DT-23" conducted by the Army Corps 12 at TB1 Shooting Range on December 23.

It was publicly revealed for the first time at the Vietnam Defence Expo 2024 and was publicly displayed again at the National Achievements Exhibition.
