= Vietnam Defence Industry =

Vietnamese defence industry management agency

General Department of Defence Industry
- Tổng cục Công nghiệp Quốc phòng Vietnam Defence Industry
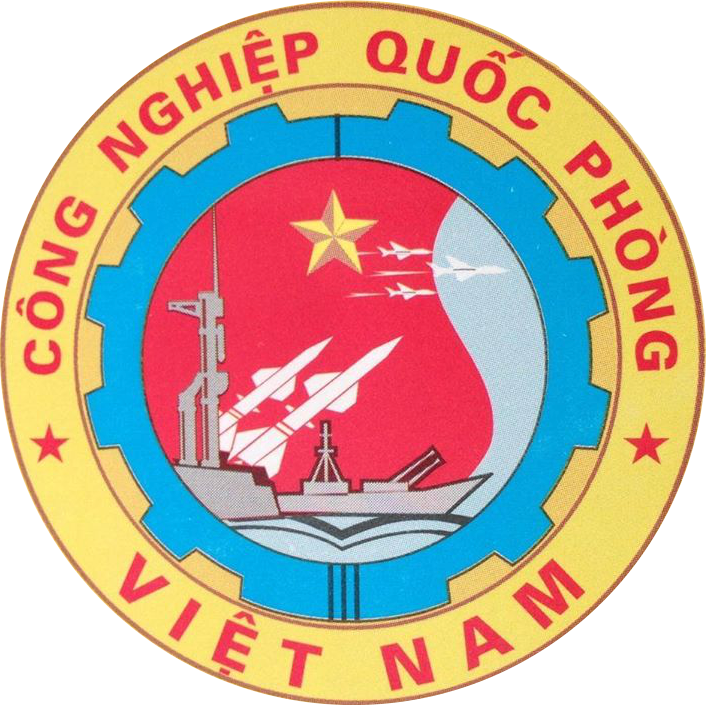
- Emblem

- Logo

Agency overview
- Formed: 15 September 1945; 80 years ago
- Preceding agencies: Department of Military Engineering (1945–1950); Bureau of Military Manufacture (1950–1958); Military Industry Section under General Technical Department (1974–1989)
- Type: Governmental Agency
- Jurisdiction: Vietnam People's Army
- Headquarters: 28A Điện Biên Phủ, Ba Đình, Hanoi
- Motto: Responsibility & Creativity
- Employees: ~25,000
- Annual budget: Classified
- Agency executives: Hồ Quang Tuấn, Director General; Đinh Quốc Hùng, Political Commissar; Lương Thanh Chương, Deputy Director and Chief of Staff
- Parent department: CPV CMC
- Parent agency: (Vietnam) Ministry of Defence
- Website: vdi.org.vn

The General Department of Defence Industry (Tổng cục Công nghiệp Quốc phòng - TCCNQP), doing business as Vietnam Defence Industry (VDI), is a government agency under the Vietnam Ministry of National Defence. It was established on 15 September 1945, and is tasked with developing, organizing, and managing core national defence industrial bases. These include weapon design and R&D institutes, production plants, industrial corporations, and manufacturing enterprises responsible for producing and supplying military equipment, weapons, and technical means to support the Vietnam People's Army in defending the country.

== History ==
The General Department of Defence Industry traces its roots to September 15, 1945, when President Hồ Chí Minh signed a decree to establish the Department of Military Ordnance under the Ministry of Defence. The department, led by Nguyễn Ngọc Xuân, was responsible for collecting, purchasing, and organizing facilities for the production of military weapons and equipment. Its structure included divisions for research, procurement, weapon design, and administration.

Following Decree No. 34/SL, the department was reorganized into the Ordnance Manufacturing Bureau under the General Command of the People's Army of Vietnam. Vũ Anh was appointed as the bureau chief by Decree No. 35/SL dated March 25, 1946. Regional agencies were also established to directly manage weapon repair and production for military units.

On February 4, 1947, the bureau was renamed the Ordnance Department, headed by the renowned weapons engineer Trần Đại Nghĩa, who would later become a major general. The department consisted of three offices and one administrative unit: the Technical Research Office (responsible for design and prototyping), the Military Workshop Office (managing production planning and technique), the Trade Office (handling procurement), and the Administrative Office (in charge of finance, administration, and logistics).

On July 11, 1950, the Ordnance Department was transferred to the General Department of Supply, part of the General Command. Later, on November 4, 1958, the (Vietnam) issued Decree No. 262/NĐA, merging the Ordnance Department with the Department of Armaments to form a new Ordnance Department under the General Department of Logistics, headed by Nguyễn Văn Nam.

On January 29, 1966, the Ministry of National Defence separated the Ordnance Department into two: the Department of Ordnance and the Department of Armaments.

On September 10, 1974, following Resolution No. 39/QUTW by the Central Military Commission, the Council of Ministers issued Decree No. 221/CP to establish the General Department of Technology. The ordnance sector was reorganized into departments for technical and production management, as well as for overseeing weapons and ammunition manufacturing facilities.

On April 5, 1976, the General Department of Economic Construction was founded under Decree No. 59/CP by the government, but it was gradually dissolved by the late 1980s.

On November 7, 1985, the General Department of Economy was formed via Decree No. 260/HĐBT by the Council of Ministers (now the Government).

On March 3, 1989, the General Department of Defence Industry and Economy was created by merging the General Department of Economy and some units from the General Department of Technology. It was tasked with managing defence industry factories and enterprises.

On December 24, 1998, the Prime Minister of Vietnam issued Decision No. 249/1998/QĐ-TTg to reorganize units under the Ministry of Defence. Accordingly, the General Department of Defence Industry and Economy relinquished its economic mobilization functions and was renamed the General Department of Defence Industry.

Since July 2000, the General Department of Defence Industry has operated under this name. The Ministry of Defence delegated the function of managing defence industry to the General Department, while the economic management role (including military-owned enterprises) was assigned to the Department of Economy.

According to the Ordinance on the Defence Industry passed on January 26 by the Standing Committee of the 12th National Assembly, the defence industry includes two types of facilities. Core facilities (for research, production, repair, and modernization of military equipment) are directly managed by the Ministry of Defence. Mobilization facilities (built to serve national defence needs when necessary) are managed by the Ministry of Industry and Trade.

At the 3rd session of the National Assembly Standing Committee on December 18, 2007, Minister of Defence General Phùng Quang Thanh proposed that after 2012, the defence industry should be integrated into the national industrial system under government management, with the Ministry of Defence retaining oversight only over core defence industry facilities.

== Current leadership ==
- Director, Deputy Secretary of the Party Committee: Lieutenant General Hồ Quang Tuấn
- Commissar, Secretary of the Party Committee: Major General Đinh Quốc Hùng
- Deputy Director cum Chief of Staff: Major General Lương Thanh Chương
- Deputy Director: Major General Phạm Thanh Khiết
- Deputy Director: Major General Dương Văn Yên
- Deputy Director: Major General Lê Quang Tuyến
- Deputy Commissar: Major General Nguyễn Việt Hùng
- Deputy Commissar: Colonel Nguyễn Đức Tăng
