= Telephone numbers in Tanzania =

- Tanzania (dark green)
- Country: Tanzania
- Continent: Africa
- Regulator: Tanzania Communications Regulatory Authority
- Country code: +255
- International access: 000
- Long-distance: 0

The following are the telephone codes in Tanzania.

== Format ==
- +255 XXX XXX XXX or +255XX XXX XXXX calling from outside Tanzania
- 0XXX XXX XXX or 0XX XXX XXXX - calling within Tanzania

The NSN length is nine digits.

- Subscriber Number length under 2X, 4X, 6X and 7X NDCs is 7 digits.
- Subscriber Number length under 8XY and 90X NDCs is 6 digits.

== Calls between Tanzania, Kenya, and Uganda ==
Calls to Kenya and Uganda require a regional prefix rather than having to use full international dialling. To call Kenya from Tanzania, subscribers dial 005 instead of +254, while to call Uganda, they dial 006 rather instead of +256. To call Tanzania from Kenya and Uganda, subscribers dial 007 instead of +255.

Until 1999, Tanzania, Kenya and Uganda shared a telephone numbering plan, in which subscribers were only required to dial the trunk code, area code and number. In that year, Tanzania adopted a new numbering plan.

== Geographic number for fixed telephony services (area codes) ==
LIST OF ALLOCATIONS
| Area Code | Region |
|---|---|
| 20 | [spare area code] |
| 21 | [spare area code] |
| 22 | Dar es Salaam Region |
| 23 | Lindi, Morogoro, Mtwara, & Pwani Regions |
| 24 | Zanzibar (Mjini Magharibi, Pemba North, Pemba South, Unguja North, & Unguja South Regions) |
| 25 | Katavi, Mbeya, Rukwa, Ruvuma, & Songwe Regions |
| 26 | Dodoma, Iringa, Njombe, Singida, & Tabora Regions |
| 27 | Arusha, Kilimanjaro, Manyara, & Tanga Regions |
| 28 | Geita, Kagera, Kigoma, Mara, Mwanza, Shinyanga, & Simiyu Regions |
| 29 | [spare area code] |

== VoIP services ==
VoIP services begin with 41:

LIST OF ALLOCATIONS
| Prefix | Usage and operator |
|---|---|
| 41 11 | Africa Online |
| 41 12 | SimbaNET |
| 41 14 | Six Telecoms |
| 41 15 | Startel / Raha |

== Non-geographic numbers for corporate networks ==
Non-geographic numbers for corporate networks start with 5.

== Mobile telephone numbers ==
See also Telecommunications in Tanzania#Telephones

Mobile numbers start with 6 or 7:

LIST OF ALLOCATIONS Non-geographic number for mobile telephony services – (Find Me Anywhere)
| Prefix | Operator | Trading as | Operational |
|---|---|---|---|
| 61 | Viettel Tanzania Limited | halotel | yes |
| 62 | Viettel Tanzania Limited | halotel | no |
| 63 | Mkulima African Telecommunication Company Limited | Amotel | no |
| 64 | Wiafrica Tanzania Limited | CooTel | no |
| 65 | MIC Tanzania Limited | tiGo | yes |
| 66 | Smile Communications Tanzania Limited | smile | yes |
| 67 | MIC Tanzania Limited | tiGo | yes |
| 68 | Airtel Tanzania Limited | airtel | yes |
| 69 | Airtel Tanzania Limited | airtel | yes |
| 71 | MIC Tanzania Limited | tiGo | yes |
| 72 | MO Mobile Holding Limited | | no |
| 73 | Tanzania Telecommunications Company Ltd | TTCL | yes |
| 74 | Vodacom Tanzania Limited | Vodacom | yes |
| 75 | Vodacom Tanzania Limited | Vodacom | yes |
| 76 | Vodacom Tanzania Limited | Vodacom | yes |
| 77 | MIC Tanzania Limited | tiGo | yes |
| 78 | Airtel Tanzania Limited | airtel | yes |
| 79 | Vodacom Tanzania Limited | Vodacom | yes |

== Special and premium-rate numbers ==
Non-geographic numbering begins 8 or 9:

LIST OF ALLOCATIONS
| Prefix | Usage |
|---|---|
| 800 | Allocated for national toll-free services |
| 808 | Allocated for international toll-free services |
| 840 | Allocated for national shared-cost services on fixed network |
| 860 | Allocated for national toll-rate services on fixed network |
| 861 | Allocated for national special rates on fixed network |
| 90X | Allocated for national premium services |

== Short codes ==
LIST OF ALLOCATIONS
| Prefix | Usage |
|---|---|
| 110 | Emergency services for Lake Victoria and other water bodies |
| 111 | Crime Stoppers |
| 112 | Police Emergency |
| 113 | Anti-corruption |
| 114 | Fire services |
| 115 | Ambulance Services |
| 116 | Child Help Line |
| 117 | Health Help Line |
| 118 | Safety in National Parks and Game Reserves |
| 119 | Anti-Drugs |
| 123 | Voice Mail Retrieval |
| 124 | Indirect Voice Mail Deposit/ Retrieval |
| 180 | Electricity services (TANESCO) |
| 181 | Water & Sewage services |
| 182 | Fault reporting on the ICT backbone |
| 183 | Gas |
| 190 | Disaster Services |
| 199 | Afya Call center (Health emergency, education, and information services) |
