= List of mobile network operators in Tanzania =

This is a list of mobile network operators in Tanzania:

As of 2018, there were an estimated 43,497,261 million mobile phone subscribers out of an estimated population of 53,853,702 people, representing an 80.77 percent penetration rate. At the same time, the country's internet customers numbered 22,281,727, representing a 41.37 percent penetration rate.

== Market share ==
As of December 2018, the market share among Tanzanian mobile telephone operators, as reported by those operators, was as follows:

Rank	Operator	Customers	Market share percentage
1	Vodacom Tanzania Limited (trading as "Vodacom")	14,143,657	32.42
2	MIC Tanzania Limited (trading as "tiGo")	12,583,640	28.85
3	Airtel Tanzania Limited (trading as "Airtel")	10,954,621	25.11
4	Viettel Tanzania Limited (trading as "Halotel")	3,942,237	9.04
5	Zanzibar Telecom Limited (trading as "Zantel")	1,153,641	2.64
6	Tanzania Telecommunications Company Limited (trading as "TTCL")	711,411	1.63
7	Cats Net Tanzania Limited	132,292	0.30
	Total	43,621,499	100.00

- Note:Totals may be slightly off due to rounding.

== See also ==
- Tanzania Communications Regulatory Authority
- Economy of Tanzania
