= Telecommunications in Tanzania =

Telecommunications in Tanzania include radio, television, fixed and Mobile phones which remain the most widely used communication devices in Tanzania, supported by an expanding mobile network infrastructure and affordable prepaid services. Internet service are available on the Tanzanian mainland and the semiautonomous Zanzibar archipelago.

== Regulation and licensing ==
In 2005, mainland Tanzania, but not the semiautonomous Zanzibar archipelago, modified its licensing system for electronic communications, modelling it on the approach successfully pioneered in Malaysia in the late 1990s where traditional "vertical" licenses (the right to operate a telecom or a broadcasting network, and right to provide services on that network) are replaced by "horizontal" licenses (the right to operate telecom and broadcasting networks, with a separate license required to provide services on each network). Called the "Converged Licensing Framework (CLF)", this reform was the first of its kind put into practice on the African continent, and allows investors to concentrate on their area of expertise (i.e. network facility, network services, application services, and content services) across a larger number of previously separate sectors (i.e. telecommunications, broadcasting, Internet). This reform should, among other things, facilitate the arrival of telephone services over cable television networks, television services over telecommunications networks, and Internet services over all types of networks.

Under the Converged Licensing Framework four categories of license are available:

- Network facility, the provision of any element or combination of physical infrastructure used principally for, or in connection with, the provision of Content services and other Application services, but not including customer premises equipment;
- Network service, a service for carrying information in the form of speech or other sound, data, text or images, by means of guided or unguided electromagnetic energy, but not including services provided solely on the customer side of the network boundary;
- Application service, the reselling of electronic communication services to end users; and
- Content service, a service offered for sound, data, text or images whether still or moving except where transmitted on private communication.

At the end of 2013 there were:

- 21 network facility operators: 8 international and national, 11 national, and 2 regional;
- 17 network service operators: 8 international and national, 6 national, and 3 regional;
- 91 application service operators: 1 international, 15 international and national, 62 national, 11 regional, and 2 district;
- 85 radio content service operators: 6 national + commercial, 10 regional + commercial, 7 regional + non-commercial, 30 district + commercial, and 29 district + non-commercial;
- 30 television content service operators: 5 national + commercial, 4 regional + commercial, 1 regional + non-commercial, 6 district + commercial, and 17 district + non-commercial.

A complete list of licensed operators and contractors is available from the Tanzania Communication Regulatory Authority (TCRA) website.

== Radio and television ==
- A state-owned national radio station and more than 40 privately owned radio stations are in operation (2007).
- A state-owned TV station and multiple privately owned TV stations are in operation (2007).
- The transmissions of several international broadcasters are available (2007).

There are government restrictions on broadcasting in tribal languages.

The semiautonomous Zanzibari government controls the content of all public and private radio and television broadcasts in its islands. Even in the case of state television broadcast from the mainland, there was a delay in the feed, allowing Zanzibari censors to intervene. However, Zanzibari radio stations operate relatively independently, often reading the content of national dailies, including articles critical of the Zanzibari government.

== Telephones ==
- Calling code: +255
- International call prefix: 000
- Main lines: 161,100 lines in use, 133rd in the world (2011).
- Mobile cellular: 27.2 million lines, 39th in the world (2012).
- Telephone system: telecommunications services are marginal; fixed-line telephone network inadequate with less than 1 connection per 100 persons; system operating below capacity and being modernized for better service; Very Small Aperture Terminal (VSAT) system under construction; mobile-cellular service, aided by multiple providers, is increasing rapidly and in 2011 exceeded a subscriber base of 50 telephones per 100 persons; trunk service provided by open-wire, microwave radio relay, tropospheric scatter, and fiber-optic cable; some links being made digital (2010).
- Communications cables: landing point for two fiber-optic cables (2010):
  - SEACOM submarine and terrestrial high speed fibre-optic cable linking the countries of the east and west coasts of Africa to each other and on to Europe and India; and
  - the EASSy fiber-optic submarine cable system linking East Africa with Europe, and North America.
- Satellite earth stations: 2 Intelsat (1 Indian Ocean, 1 Atlantic Ocean) (2010).

Mobile phone companies

Some of the mobile phone companies operating in Tanzania with market share as of December 2022 as published by the Tanzania Communication Regulatory Authority are:

- Vodacom Tanzania 30%
- Airtel Tanzania 28%
- MIC Tanzania Limited (Tigo Tanzania) formerly Mobitel 26%
- Viettel Tanzania (Halotel) 13%
- Tanzania Telecommunications Corporation 3%
- Smile Communications Tanzania 0%

== Internet ==
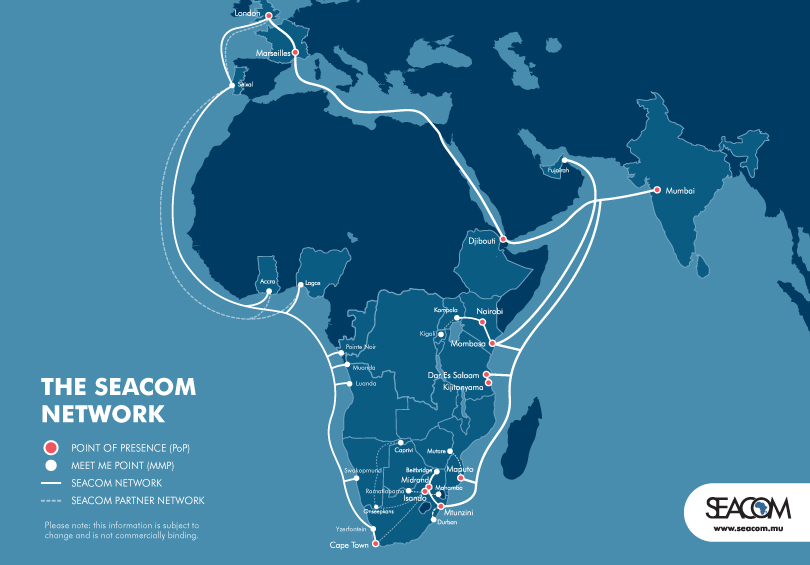
SEACOM-Network Map. Click on map to enlarge.

- Top-level domain: .tz
- Internet users: 7.2 million users; 13.1% of the population, 182nd in the world (2016);
- Fixed broadband: 3,753 subscriptions, 164th in the world; less than 0.05% of the population, 187th in the world (2012).
- Wireless broadband: 698,531 subscriptions, 81st in the world; 1.5% of the population, 130th in the world (2012).
- Internet hosts: 26,074 hosts, 110th in the world (2012).
- IPv4: 846,152 addresses allocated as of 27 November 2014, 0.02 percent of the world total, 17.9 addresses per 1,000 people (based on the 2014 population estimate of 47.4 million).

Internet services have been available since 1995, but there was no international fiber connectivity available until 2009. Before then, connectivity to the rest of the world, including to neighboring countries, was obtained using satellite networks. The SEACOM and the Eastern Africa Submarine Cable System submarine fiber cable projects were implemented in July 2009 and July 2010, respectively, and brought higher speed Internet connectivity to Tanzania with lower latency and lower cost. This resulted in more than an eight-fold improvement in download speeds from between 90 and 200 kbit/s in mid to late 2008 to between 1.5 and 1.8 Mbit/s in late 2009 with further improvements to between 3.6 and 4.2 Mbit/s in 2013.

=== Internet service providers ===
Some of the Internet service providers operating in Tanzania are:

- Green Telecom
- Flashnet
- CTV-Faibafasta
- SIMPLYCONNECT
- Afsat Communications Tanzania Limited
- Arusha Node Marie
- Benson Online
- BLINK BY GADGETRONIX
- Cats-Net
- Maisha Broadband
- Kicheko
- Raha
- SimbaNet
- Tansat
- Tanzania Telecommunications Company Limited] (TTCL)
- University of Dar es Salaam Computing Centre
- Vizocom
- ZanLink
- ComNet-TZ

=== Data operators ===
Some of the data operators in Tanzania are:

- Green Telecom
- Flashnet
- Afsat Communications Tanzania Limited
- SatCom Networks Africa Limited
- SimbaNet
- Startel Tanzania Limited, also known as raha
- Tansat
- Tanzania Telecommunications Company Limited (TTCL).

=== Censorship and surveillance ===
There are no government restrictions on access to the Internet; however, the government monitors websites that criticize the government. Police also monitor the Internet to combat illegal activities.

== Freedom of speech ==
The constitution provides for freedom of speech, but does not explicitly provide for freedom of the press. A permit is required for reporting on police or prison activities, and journalists need special permission to attend meetings in the Zanzibar House of Representatives. Anyone publishing information accusing a Zanzibari representative of involvement in illegal activities is liable to a fine of not less than TSh 250,000/= (US$158), three years' imprisonment, or both. Nothing in the law specifies whether this penalty stands if the allegation is proven true. Media outlets often practice self-censorship to avoid conflict with the government.

The law generally prohibits arbitrary interference with privacy, family, home, or correspondence without a search warrant, but the government does not consistently respect these prohibitions. It is widely believed that security forces monitor telephones and correspondence of some citizens and foreign residents. The actual nature and extent of this practice is unknown.

Under the Electronic and Postal Communications (Online Content) Regulations 2018, blogs, online forums, and internet radio and television operations, must register with the government as an online content provider, and pay an annual fee. The fee is roughly equivalent to the annual income in Tanzania. Online content providers may not post obscene or explicit content, hate speech, content that "causes annoyance", incites harm or crime, or threatens national security and public safety. Violators may be fined or have their licences revoked.

== See also ==
- Tanzania Communication Regulatory Authority
- Tanzania Internet eXchange
- Terrestrial fibre optic cable projects in Tanzania
- Media of Tanzania
- List of newspapers in Tanzania
