= Tanzania Telecommunications Corporation =

- Generation T. Solved Logo
- Industry: Communications Services
- Founded: 1993 (commenced operations on 1 January 1994)
- Headquarters: Extelecoms House, Samora Avenue, Kisutu, Dar es Salaam, Tanzania
- Area served: Tanzania
- Key people: Eng. Peter Ulanga, Director General, Eng. Mkindi, Eng. Dogani
- Products: TTCL Broad band, TTCL Mobile, IP VPN, Prepaid Services, Postpaid Services, Rafiki Public Phone, Leased Circuits, Internet Bandwidth, Broadband and Wholesale Administrator
- Revenue: ▲TSh 93 billion (2013)
- Net income: ▲TSh 16 billion (2013)
- Owner: Tanzanian Government (100%)
- Number of employees: 1,600 (Feb 2016)
- Website: Company Website

Tanzania Telecommunications Corporation, formerly Tanzania Telecommunications Company Limited (TTCL), is the oldest and largest fixed line telecommunications company in Tanzania. The company comes forth from the former Tanzania Posts and Telecommunications Corporation in 1993. TTCL was wholly owned by the Government of Tanzania until the partial privatisation of the company on 23 February 2001.

TTCL is governed by statute—the Tanzania Telecommunications Act of 1993. The company is licensee for fixed basic telephone services in Tanzania mainland and Zanzibar and hence it owns and operates the public switched telephone network in mainland Tanzania and on Zanzibar. Before the coming of mobile operators in late 1994, the company was enjoying monopoly on Tanzania Mainland and a duopoly on Zanzibar, where Zanzibar Telecoms Limited (Zantel) was the second licensed fixed basic telephony operator. The company has been in several joint managements due to its financial instability in the past and has gone through several restructuring phases.

It has been working with Huawei Technologies Co. Ltd as the infrastructure vendor of the company and Ericsson as a long-term strategic supplier of the company.

== History ==
=== Early history ===
TTCL traces its roots to the East African telecommunications provider. In 1933, the former East African Post and Telegraph Company covered Postal, Telegraph and Telephone services in the three East African nations of Tanganyika, Kenya and Uganda. In 1951 the British government replaced the East African Post and Telegraph Company and enacted the East African Posts and Telecommunication Act in 1951 to charter the East African Posts and Telecommunications Administration.

In 1967, post independence of the three nations, the East African Community (EAC) was founded and replaced the East African Common Services Organization. In the aftermath, the East African Post and Telecommunications Corporation (EAP&TC) was established and replaced the East African Posts and Telecommunications Administration. However, ten years later, the breaking up of EAC in 1977 forced EAC member countries to re-establish their own national Postal, Telegraph and Telephone businesses. Therefore, in 1978 in Tanzania a parastatal was established under the name Tanzania Posts and Telecommunications Corporation (TPTC).

In 1993 when the government of Tanzania heavily restructured parastatals, the Telecommunication sector was liberalised. This saw the splitting up of the TPTC; the TPTC split into three separate entities, namely the Tanzania Posts Corporation, the Tanzania Telecommunications Company Limited (TTCL), and the Tanzania Communication Commission (TCC).

=== Partial privatisation ===
With increased domestic competition and poor management the government decided to privatise the company. The partial privatisation of TTCL began on 23 February 2001, with Celtel International (previously known as MSI Cellular) headquartered in Amsterdam, Netherlands, together with the German firm Detecon, obtained 35% shares from the Government of Tanzania. The consortium took over Board and Management control of TTCL, and 23 February 2001 onward, had a veto over major board of directors decisions, right to appoint the senior management, to set the annual business plan and to control all capital expenditure decisions. In August 2005, TTCL pulled out from joint management and the Government of Tanzania and Celtel International signed an agreement whereby the shareholders agreed to the restructuring of the two companies and thereafter the TTCL and the Celtel became legally, financially and operationally totally separate companies.

==== SaskTel ====
In 2006, TTCL faced a number of financial and operating issues that threaten the long term viability of the company. In February 2007, shareholders awarded a Canadian firm, SaskTel, a three-year executive management contract to lead a technology, financial, operational and cultural transformation of TTCL. The contract required the new senior management team to improve the long term competitive position of TTCL and grow its customer and revenue sources. SaskTel International assume leadership of TTCL in July 2007. However, a disagreement between SaskTel and the majority shareholder on the long term capital funding plan of TTCL, negotiated by SaskTel to support the growth plan, resulted in SaskTel submitted a 45-day notice of termination on 12 July 2009, effectively ending the management contract. While the TTCL Board of Directors approved the financing plan, the majority shareholders refused to support the plan resulting in the SaskTel senior management team officially leaving the organization in September 2009.

==== Transfer of shares ====
In September 2013 Celtel's Parent Company MTC Group was acquired by Zain International BV of Kuwait. Along with the celtel brand, Zain also acquired the 35% share in TTCL. From the 2005 agreement Celtel and TTCL were considered separate legal entities and therefore, Zain had no direct control over the companies operations. Similarly on 8 June 2010, Bharti Airtel struck a deal to purchase of mobile operations in 15 African countries from Zain and inherited the stake.

=== Nationalization ===
In February 2016, Bharti Airtel owner of 35 percent stake in the state telecom company agreed to sell its shares back to the government for TSh 14 billion. The dispute between the company and the government lasted for three years as the company demanded more money in compensation. However, the sale was concluded on 23 June 2016 and the company returned to being entirely state owned.

== Corporate affairs ==
The head office of Tanzania Telecommunications Company Limited at the Extelecom's Building in Samora Avenue, east of Kisutu.

=== Ownership ===
Currently the company is wholly owned by the Government. In 2001 the government of Tanzania sold 35% stake in the company and in 2016 to protect the firm, repurchased the stock to regain 100 percent ownership. The last partners of the company were Bharti Airtel of India.

=== Business trends ===
As of March 2016 TTCL has the smallest subscriber base than the top six mobile phone operators in the country. TTCL maintains a total subscriber base of 305,000 of which 45 percent have fixed phone lines. In the fixed line market, TTCL almost has a monopoly and handles over 99 percent of the subscribers.

	2010	2011	2012	2013	2014	2015	2016
Turnover (TSh billion)	80			93	96	104	119
Turnover (US$ million)*	57.5			55.1	57.7	49.5	54.5
Net profit/loss (TSh billion)	-28			-16			
Subscribers	252,813	226,153	227,424	209,111	288,136	303,186	
Notes/sources							

=== Headquarters ===
The company has its headquarters and customer care allocated in the Extelecom's Building in Samora Avenue, east of Kisutu, south east of Dar es Salaam, east Tanzania.

Tanzania Telecommunications Company Limited also manages and operates offices and engineering departments in all regions and major towns in the country.

== See also ==
1. Vodacom Tanzania
2. Celtel Tanzania
3. MIC Tanzania Limited (tiGO)
4. Vodacom
5. 3G Technology
6. Celtel International
7. Celtel Africa Challenge
8. Eastern Africa Submarine Cable System
9. List of mobile network operators in Tanzania
