= TzNIC =

Tanzania Network Information Center
- Founded: 2006
- Type: Non-profit organization
- Location: Dar es Salaam, Tanzania
- Website: www.tznic.or.tz

TzNIC, or the Tanzania Network Information Center is a non-profit organization and a Public Private Partnership (PPP) established by the Tanzania Communications Regulatory Authority (TCRA) and Tanzania Internet Service Providers Association (TISPA) to manage and control the operations of the ccTLD for Tanzania, .tz. It is also responsible for managing the second-level domains that come under .tz. The Tanzania Network Information Center was established on 16 November 2006 with the certificate of incorporation No. 58303. The center was established as company limited by guarantee and not by having a share capital as per the Laws of Tanzania (Chapter 212).

== History ==
In June 1993, three Tanzanians, Prof. Beda Mutagahwa, Bill Sangiwa, and Kitalima Mabula, with the help of Internet Pioneer Randy Bush, began the registration process to set up the .tz ccTLD. In accordance with ISO-3166 standards, the ccTLD was registered through IANA and ICANN. The registration was successful, and with the assistance of the government of United Republic of Tanzania, work for the development of country's Internet began with the Prof. Beda as the Director of the University Computing Center and Randy Bush as the technical contact for the ccTLD. .tz became operational in August 1994. In mid-2005, a committee was set up for the establishing TzNIC as the ccTLD operator. On 30 April 2010, ICANN approved the re-delegation of .tz to TzNIC.

== Functions of TzNIC ==
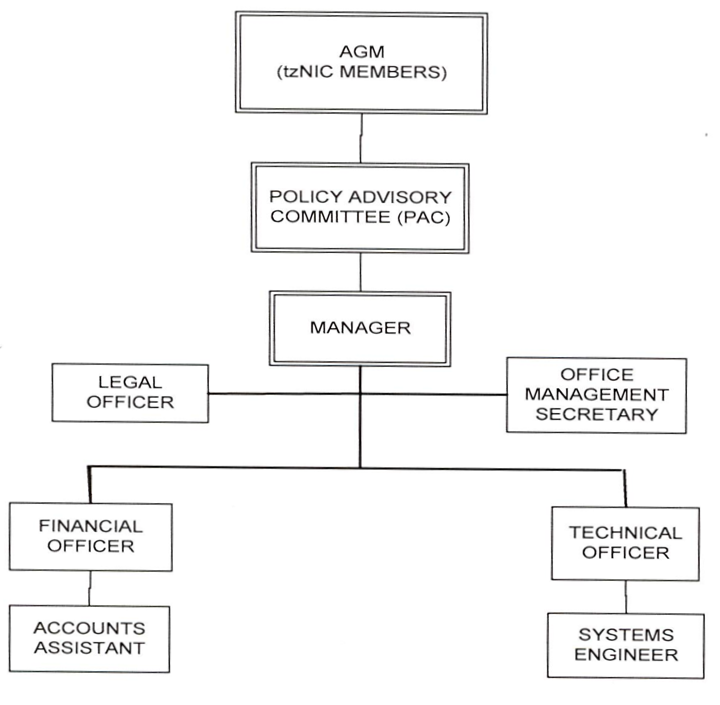
TzNIC Organizational Structure

The important functions performed by TzNIC include the following:

- Proper regulation and management of the .tz domain name space.
- To meet international standards for the ccTLD management and all the second level domain names related to it.
- To register domain names by providing correct guidelines to consumers, and working with associated registries and registrars for the appropriate regulation and management of the registration of the domain names.
- Issue regular guidelines about the management and registration of the .tz domain name space.
- Issue information and create awareness about the various standard procedures and requirements essential for the domain name registration.
- Issue important notices for any alterations or changes to any guidelines, policies, or rules related to the registration of the .tz domain name space.

== Structure ==
The TzNIC members are at the top of the hierarchy, constituting the main portion of the body, followed by the Policy Advisory Committee (PAC) and then the Manager. The Manager coordinates the Legal, Financial and Technical Officers and the Office Management Secretary. An Accounts Assistant assists the Financial Officer and a Systems Engineer assists the Technical Officer.
