= Vodacom Tanzania =

Tanzanian telecommunications company

Coordinates: 06°46′41″S 39°15′37″E

- Type: Public
- Traded as: DSE: VODA
- Industry: Communications Services
- Founded: August 15, 2000; 26 years ago
- Headquarters: Dar es Salaam, Tanzania
- Key people: Justice (rtd) Thomas Mihayo; Chairman; Sitholizwe Mdlalose; CEO and Managing Director
- Products: Wireless: 3G HSDPA Data Card, 3G HSDPA USB Modem, Booster Card, VodaFASTA, VodaChoice, VodaJAZA, Toll-free, Corporate Talk, People's phone, Vodago, TSh Vouchers, Foreign Vouchers and Vodashops.
- Number of employees: 548 (2019)
- Parent: Vodacom
- Website: Company website

Vodacom Tanzania Limited is Tanzania's leading cellular network company. As of December 2020, Vodacom Tanzania had over 15.6 million customers and was the largest Wireless telecommunications network in Tanzania. Vodacom Tanzania is the second telecom company in Africa, after Vodacom, to switch on its 3G High-Speed Downlink Packet Access (HSDPA) which was available only in Dar Es Salaam in early 2007.

== Location ==
Vodacom Tanzania has its executive headquarters on the 15th Floor of the Vodacom Towers at 23 Ursino Estate, along Old Bagamoyo Road, in Dar es Salaam, the financial capital of Tanzania. The geographical coordinates of the company headquarters are: 06°46'41.0"S, 39°15'37.0"E (Latitude:-6.778056; Longitude:39.260278).

== Overview ==
The company was created in late 1999 as a subsidiary company of Vodacom based in South Africa. At the onset, Vodacom Tanzania was a joint venture between the Vodacom Group, with approximately 65 percent, with the remaining 35 percent owned by Tanzanian shareholders, that included Mirambo Holdings.

By August 2000, the company completed its GSM infrastructure and went live on 14 August 2000. Vodacom Tanzania announced officially its commercial operations on 15 August 2000. Vodacom Tanzania became the largest mobile operator in the country within one year of launching and remains the largest mobile communications network operator in Tanzania up to date.

The company has active roaming agreements with many mobile network operators in the world that include T-Mobile USA, in the United States, Vodafone Limited in the United Kingdom and Vodafone India in India. it's a component company of the Tanzania All Share Index

== History ==
=== Licensed ===
Vodacom Group was licensed in December 1999 to operate a GSM cellular network in Tanzania and formed the subsidiary company Vodacom Tanzania Limited. The group also has operations in Kenya (Safaricom), Lesotho and the Democratic Republic of Congo.

When Vodacom entered in Tanzania there was one GSM 900 MHz cellular operator, Tritel, on the mainland of Tanzania, with about 20,000 active subscribers and another operator who was operating exclusively on the island of Zanzibar. There was also an analogue cellular network operator, MIC Tanzania Limited (tiGO), with active subscriber base of about 50,000. tiGo was known as Mobitel when it started its operation within the country in late 1993. There was also one government owned fixed-line telecommunications operator, Tanzania Telecommunications Company Limited, TTCL. Vodacom Tanzania was the third licensed network operator in Tanzania and became the largest mobile communications network operator in the country within one year of launching.

=== Vodacom Tanzania Partnership ===
Vodacom Tanzania was licensed in Tanzania with its local partners Planetel Communications holding 36% and Caspian Construction holding 16%. Later Planetel decreased its stake to 16%, while Caspian's increased to 19%.

A representative of Caspian on the Vodacom Tanzania board was businessman Rostam Aziz, a close supporter of President Jakaya Kikwete. At the time Vodacom was licensed in Tanzania, both men were not as powerful as they later became.

Vodacom Tanzania Tentered in a partnership with Flickswitch in September 2019 to launch a its sim management system in Tanzania.

== Network ==
The native Vodacom Tanzania network operates on the dual band GSM 1800 MHz and 900 MHz. The network was fixed in 2000 by Siemens based in South Africa. It was claimed that the 900 and 1800 GSM network was extremely hi-tech for mobile telecommunications in Africa, with an IN platform as well as various management and maintenance platforms.

In late 2006 Vodacom Tanzania deployed The VectaStar wireless transmission equipment and the backhaul network was commercially operated in the same year. Operating in the licensed 10.5 GHz spectrum band, the network covers the areas of Dar Es Salaam, Arusha, Moshi and Mwanza. Vodacom Tanzania has highly improved customer service levels, which use IVR technology. As such, Vodacom customers are now served in two languages, Swahili and English.

=== Roaming ===
As of December 2020 Tanzania had 51 million telecom subscribers, Vodacom leading the market share with 30.6% of subscribers (15.6 million).

Vodacom Tanzania mainly resides and operates in Tanzania mainland and the company acts as a mobile virtual network operator (MVNO) on the mainland for ZanTel. ZanTel has its own network in Zanzibar, and has made an agreement with Vodacom Tanzania to use the latter's facilities on the mainland, and thus, essentially to provide national roaming.

In East Africa, Vodacom Tanzania has its footprints within Tanzania and it has roaming arrangements with a number of East African carriers, such as MTN Uganda and Safaricom Kenya. The free-roaming zone in East Africa, between Kenya, Tanzania and Uganda was formed on 2 February 2007. Similarly to "One Network", world's first borderless network across East Africa, launched by Celtel on 27 September 2006. The free-roaming zone enables its subscribers to roam free between these countries, thereby scrapping roaming charges, making telephone calls and sending SMS at their home tariff and receiving incoming phone calls and SMS for free. It also enables them to buy airtime with their own vouchers when travelling outside of their home country.

As of 2008, Vodacom Tanzania prepaid customers have only restricted roaming privileges (except for Kenya and Uganda roaming). While international roaming is available to all post-paid customers, it must first be activated through customer service. Once provisioned, charges for calls and SMS made and received while on international roaming are then added to customer's monthly post-paid account back in Tanzania. The company has International Roaming through partnerships with 288 live networks across 140 countries and territories such as Kerala in India. The newest roaming destinations include China and Germany. In Germany Vodacom prepaid customers are allowed to roam with Vodafone D2.

=== 3G Upgrading ===
The 3G technology was part of a $126 million broadband technology roll-out and part of $1.3 million capital expenditure programme to extend the network of Vodacom in Tanzania as of December 2006. Again Siemens Communications based in South Africa was awarded a contract by Vodacom Tanzania to deliver and install the complete 3G network including HSDPA (High Speed Downlink Packet Access) technology. This is the second 3G network to be set up by Siemens in Southern Africa and it is claimed to be the first truly high-speed mobile broadband connectivity available in Tanzania. Siemens Communications was already responsible for building the 3G network for Vodacom in South Africa.

Although the 3G technology was officially used in early 2007, the technology and required frequency supporting 3G services was in operational since early December 2006 as a testing phase to optimize the network. The company planned to extend the 3G capabilities to other regions of Tanzania in the aftermath of successful assessment of the first 3G roll-out. Vodacom Tanzania is the first in East Africa with such technology and it is claimed that 3G HSDPA gives a major competitive advantage to customers.

=== Plans for WiMAX ===
Among other network operators in Tanzania, Vodacom Tanzania has a plan to deploy WiMAX technology. Others include TTCL, tiGO, and ZanTel. As for 28 September 2007, Celtel Tanzania could not indicate any plan for WiMAX roll-out.

Vodacom Tanzania's plans for WiMAX was followed by spectrum guaranteed by regulator for 3.5 GHz. The guaranteed spectrum will be used for targeting data transfer for corporate sector in major cities within the country.

Currently Vodacom Tanzania is using Cambridge Broadband's VectaStar equipment. This equipment can be deployed to backhaul traffic from both, mobile and data networks, including GSM, 3G and WiMAX sites. Actually, the equipment was fixed by Cambridge Broadband Limited as per radio transmission equipment contract. Vodacom Tanzania awarded the major radio transmission equipment contract to Cambridge Broadband Limited on 5 September 2006.

== Ownership ==
The shares of the stock of Vodacom Tanzania are traded in the Dar es Salaam Stock Exchange. In March 2020, Vodacom Group Limited acquired 26.25% of the Company’s shares that were owned by Mirambo Limited. As of October 2022, the shareholding in the company stock was as depicted in the table below.

Vodacom Tanzania Stock Ownership
Rank	Name of Owner	Percentage Ownership
1	Vodacom	75
2	Government Employees Pension Fund of South Africa	7.3
3	Institutional Investors (East Africa)	11.2
4	Institutional Investors (Rest of the world)	2.3
4	Others	4.2
	Total	100.00

== Other Telecom Companies In Tanzania ==
The table below illustrates the market shareholding among the active mobile network operators in Tanzania, as of 31 December 2020.

Market Shareholding Among Mobile Network Operators in Tanzania
Rank	Name of Operator	Market-share Percentage	Notes
1	Vodacom Tanzania	31.0	Basic voice services, Data transfer, Mobile Money
2	Airtel Tanzania	27.0	Basic voice services, Data transfer, Mobile Money
3	tiGO Tanzania	25.0	Mainly voice, Carrier of carriers, Mobile Money
4	Halotel	13.0	Voice, International access, Data transfer, Mobile Money
5	Zantel Tanzania	2.0	Voice, International access
6	TTCL	2.0	Voice, data transfer, Mobile Money
7	Smile Communications Tanzania	0.0024	Mobile and Fixed backbone
	Total	100.0	

== Shareholding ==
In August 2017, the shares of stock of Vodacom Tanzania were listed on the Dar es Salaam Stock Exchange, where they trade under the symbol: VODA.

== See also ==
- List of mobile network operators in Tanzania
