= List of newspapers in Tanzania =

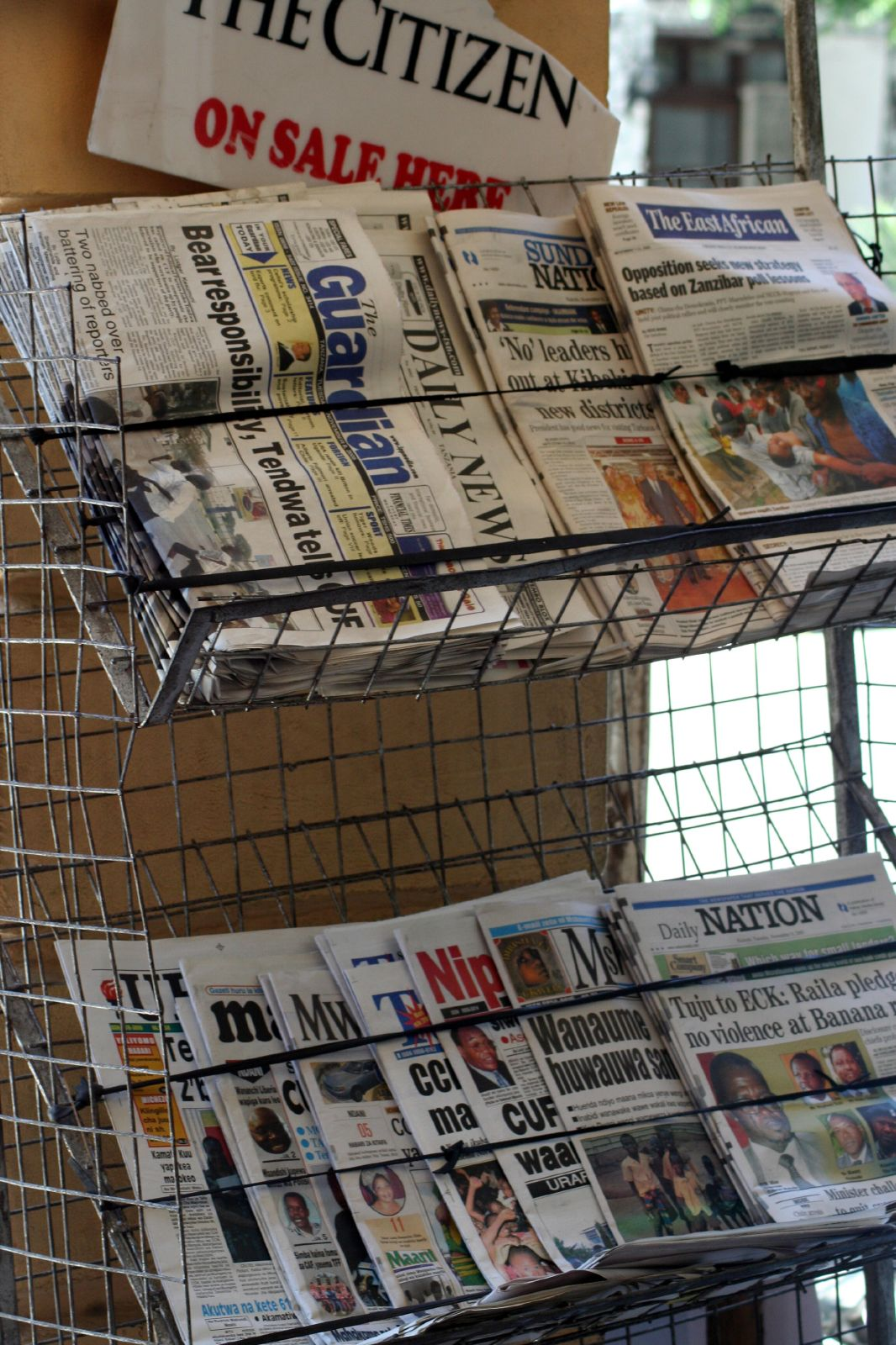
Newsstand in Dar es Salaam, 2005

This is a list of newspapers in Tanzania.

== List of newspapers ==
Newspaper	Location	First issued	Publisher	Languages	Website	Notes
The Tanzania Times	Dar es Salaam (Tanzania). Cape Town (South Africa) London (UK)	July 1995	Eastern, Central and Southern African Times News Network	English	The Tanzania Times – News from Tanzania, Africa, World, Breaking News, Weather, Environment and Climate Change	Daily/Online
Hotels Africa	Pan African Magazine	2025	Hotels Africa Organization	English	Hotels Africa - Hotels in Africa, Best Hotels in Africa, Hotel News, Lodges, Restaurants	Daily and Online
Nipashe	Mikocheni, Dar Es Salaam	Dec 1994	The Guardian Limited	Kiswahili	Homepage	Daily
The Guardian	Dar es Salaam	[1995]	The Guardian Limited	English	Homepage	Daily
Mwananchi	Tanzania		Nation Media Group	Kiswahili	Homepage	
Arusha Times	Arusha	1995	FM Arusha Limited	English	Homepage	Weekly
TanzaniaInvest	Seychelles	2003	Investment Promotions Ltd	English	www.tanzaniainvest.com	Online
Times of Tanzania	Dar es Salaam	1997	The Tanzania Times	English	The Tanzania Times – News from Tanzania, Africa, World, Breaking News, Weather, Environment and Climate Change	Online
The Kilimanjaro Post	Tanzania	2021	The Kilimanjaro Post (KILIPOST)	English	https://www.kilimanjaropost.com	Online
Daily News	Dar es Salaam	1972	Government	English	Homepage	Daily
Arusha News	Arusha	2023	Arusha News Limited	English		Weekly
Zanzibar News	Zanzibar	2025	ZNZ News Limiteed	English	znznews.com	Online Newspaper
The Swahili Echo	Dar es Salaam	2024	The Swahili Echo	Swahili	Read Only Forum	Online edition only
Habari Leo				Kiswahili	Homepage	
Majira				Swahili		
Nipashe						
Zanzibar Leo					znznews.com	
The Citizen	Tanzania		Nation Media Group	English	https://www.thecitizen.co.tz/	Daily

== See also ==
- Media of Tanzania
- List of radio stations in Africa: Tanzania
- Telecommunications in Tanzania

== Bibliography ==
- Graham L. Mytton (1968). "Tanzania: the Problems of Mass Media Development". Gazette. 14 (2): 89–100. doi:10.1177/001654926801400204. S2CID 143906494.
- William M. F. Shija (1990). "Role of Party Newspapers in Mobilizing the Masses in Tanzania: A Critical Analysis". Africa Media Review. 4 (3) – via Michigan State University Libraries, African e-Journals Project.
- "Tanzania: Directory: the Press". Africa South of the Sahara 2003. Regional Surveys of the World. Europa Publications. 2003. p. 1083. ISBN 9781857431315. ISSN 0065-3896.
- Emma Hunter (2016). "Komkya and the convening of a Chagga public, 1953-1961". In Derek Peterson; et al. (eds.). African Print Cultures: Newspapers and Their Publics in the Twentieth Century. University of Michigan Press. ISBN 978-0-472-05317-9. (About a newspaper in Moshi)
