= Business Time =

Business Time may refer to:

- "Business Time", an episode of Adventure Time (season 1)
- The Business Times (Singapore), a newspaper in Singapore
- Business Times (Malaysia), a newspaper in Malaysia, after splitting the ownership from Singapore
- Business Times (New Straits Times), the business section of the Malaysian newspaper New Straits Times
- Business Times (Tanzania)
- San Francisco Business Times, a newspaper in the United States
- The Business Times financial supplement of Sunday Times (South Africa)
- "Business Time", a song from comedy musical group Flight of the Conchords' self-titled album

== See also ==
- BT (disambiguation)
