= Amir Abdelazim =

Egyptian telecommunications executive

- Born: Egypt
- Education: Alexandria University (BSc, communications engineering)
- Occupations: Telecommunications executive, business consultant
- Years active: 2003–present
- Website: www.amirabdelazim.com

Amir Abdelazim is an Egyptian telecommunications executive and business consultant. He has held chief technology and information officer (CTIO) roles at mobile operators in Africa and the Middle East, including Millicom's Tigo-branded operations in Rwanda and Ghana and Asiacell in Iraq. A 2018 report on management changes at AirtelTigo in Ghana listed him among departing executives who had headed the operator's technology function.

In 2022 he joined the consultancy Detecon and has been described as its country leader in Egypt. Press releases by Egypt's Ministry of Communications and Information Technology have described him as managing director of Detecon in Egypt and an expert partner for technology transformation in the context of meetings held in 2023 and at Mobile World Congress 2024. Conference materials published by FutureNet World list him as a CEO adviser on transformation at Telecom Egypt.

== Early life and education ==
Abdelazim was born in Egypt and studied communications engineering at the Faculty of Engineering of Alexandria University, graduating in 2003 with a degree in communications. A 2016 announcement by Tigo Ghana states that he is a certified Project Management Professional (PMP), holds an MBA in international business, and has completed executive education at London Business School.

== Career ==
=== Millicom and African operations ===
He served as CTIO of Tigo Rwanda and then of Tigo Ghana.

A 2018 report on AirtelTigo management changes listed him among departing executives who had headed the operator's technology function.

During his time at Tigo Ghana he was quoted in regional media about deployments of point-to-multipoint base stations and dedicated wireless connectivity for businesses in Accra, Kumasi, Takoradi and Sunyani, as well as in-building coverage for high-rise commercial buildings.

=== Asiacell ===
Trade publications describe his remit as including network modernisation, extension of fibre infrastructure and preparation for nationwide 4G services.

Asiacell announced the deployment of Tier III–certified data centres in several Iraqi cities, certified by the Uptime Institute, as part of investments in cloud and enterprise services.

=== Business consulting and advisory ===
==== Detecon ====
Abdelazim joined Detecon in mid-2022 and has been described by Consultancy-me.com as the firm's country leader in Egypt. A 2024 Consultancy-me.com report on an Etisalat Egypt workshop described him as Country Leader of Detecon in Egypt.

An MCIT press release in 2023 described him as expert partner for technology transformation and managing director of Detecon in Egypt during discussions on Industry 4.0 cooperation with Detecon's Digital Engineering Center in Germany. Another MCIT press release from Mobile World Congress 2023 described him as technology transformation partner and director of Detecon's Cairo office during meetings where Detecon presented Deutsche Telekom's experience in installing fibre-optic cables. At Mobile World Congress 2024, MCIT described him as managing director of Detecon's Egypt office and noted discussions that included innovation, fibre optics, 5G applications, and potential collaboration on nationwide fibre-to-the-home deployment.

Abdelazim has also appeared as a speaker at industry events. Consultancy-me.com reported on his participation at Mobile World Congress Kigali 2023, where the outlet interviewed him in his capacity as Cairo managing director. He was also quoted by Xinhua in coverage of discussions at the same event on 5G adoption in Africa.

==== Telecom Egypt ====
Conference materials published by FutureNet World list Abdelazim as a CEO adviser on transformation at Telecom Egypt.
