= Viettel =

Vietnamese multinational telecommunications company & defense contractor

Military Industry and Telecoms Group
- Commercial logo

- Military flag of Viettel as a unit under the Vietnam People's Army
- Trade name: Viettel; Viettel Group
- Native name: Tập đoàn Công nghiệp - Viễn thông Quân đội
- Formerly: Electronics and Information Equipment Corporation (Sigelco) – 1989; Military Electronics and Telecommunications Company (Vietel) – 1995
- Type: One-member limited liability State-owned enterprise
- Industry: Telecommunications; Defence; Semiconductor
- Founded: 1 June 1989; 37 years ago
- Headquarters: Hanoi, Vietnam
- Key people: Maj. Gen. Tào Đức Thắng (Chairman & CEO)
- Products: Fixed-line telephony; Mobile telephony; Broadband; Digital television; IPTV; Defence industry
- Brands: Go to section
- Revenue: ▲US$7.25 (equivalent to $7.66 in 2025) billion (2023)
- Operating income: ▲US$1.95 (equivalent to $2.06 in 2025) billion (2023)
- Net income: ▲US$1.48 (equivalent to $1.56 in 2025) billion (2023)
- Total assets: ▲US$12.45 (equivalent to $13.16 in 2025) billion (2023)
- Total equity: ▲US$7.97 (equivalent to $8.42 in 2025) billion (2023)
- Owner: State administration of Vietnam (100%)
- Number of employees: 50,000 (2018)
- Parent: Ministry of National Defence
- Subsidiaries: Viettel Telecom
- Website: viettel.com.vn www.vietteltelecom.vn

Viettel Military Industry and Telecoms Group (DBA Viettel Group or simply Viettel; Vietnamese: Tập đoàn Công nghiệp - Viễn thông Quân đội, lit. 'the Army Industry - Telecommunications Group') is a Vietnamese state-owned multinational telecommunications, technology, defense and manufacturing conglomerate headquartered in Hanoi, Vietnam. The enterprise is under the direct administration of the Vietnam Ministry of National Defence, making it a military enterprise and officially a major production unit under the Vietnam People's Army.

Viettel Group's affiliate Viettel Telecom is the network operator with the largest market share in the Vietnamese telecommunications services market. For 30 years, Viettel has grown from a construction company to a complex of five business lines including telecommunications and information technology (IT); research and manufacture of electronic and telecommunications equipment; defense industry, and cyber security and digital services. Since 2000, Viettel has earned VND 1.78 quadrillion of revenue whereas its profit, owner's equity and return on equity reached VND 334 trillion, VND 134 trillion and 30%-40%, respectively. Viettel has spent VND 3,500 billion in CSR activities. Besides its civilian telecommunications sector, its subsidiaries Viettel High Tech and Viettel Aerospace Institute have been involved in developing, producing and supplying the Vietnam People's Army with many indigenous products and armaments such as military communication devices, military drones, surveillance radars, and missiles.

As of 2018, Viettel had 50,000 employees inside and outside the country, and served 110 million subscribers.

== History ==
=== 1989–1999: A construction company ===
Electronics and Communication Equipment Corporation (SIGELCO), the forerunner of Viettel Group (Viettel), was established on 1 June 1989. In December 1992, SIGELCO applied for the State's permission for transforming into an Electronics and Communication Equipment Company under the management of the Signal Corps.

On 13 June 1995, the Prime Minister issued Notification No. 3179/DM-DN on the permission for the establishment of Military Electronics and Telecommunications Company. On 14 July 1995, the Minister of National Defense decided to officially change the company's name to Military Electronics and Telecommunications Company, VIETEL in short. At that time, Vietel was the second firm to get a business license for all telecommunications services in Vietnam. On 1 July 1997, Vietel Post was established, first providing newspaper publishing services.

=== 2000–2009: A boom in telecommunications services market ===
On 3 February 2000, Mr. Mai Liem Truc, General Director of the General Department of Post and Telecommunications, signed a decision that allowed Vietel to pilot long-distance call services using VoIP technology. For the first time, Vietnam had an operator licensed to provide VoIP services. On 15 October 2000, Vietel officially piloted its VoIP service for the Hanoi - Ho Chi Minh City route with the "178 - Your Saving Code" campaign. At that time, Vietel was the only VoIP service provider in Vietnam. The campaign launched with phenomenal success, generating significant revenue and prestige for Vietel. They continued to expand the service to 62 more provinces (Hanoi and Ha Tay were separate at that time) and broke even just 9 months later.

On 5 December 2001, Vietel launched the international call service using VoIP technology. One year later, they launched the Internet service, connecting internationally at the speed of 2 Mbit/s while costing only one third of the current price. On 28 October 2003, the Ministry of National Defense (MOD) changed the company's name to Military Telecommunications Company, Viettel in short, under the management of the Signal Corps. In March 2003, Viettel offered long-distance public switched telephone network (PSTN) call service in Hanoi and Ho Chi Minh City. On 9 January 2004, Viettel officially launched its current logo and brand identity. On 27 April 2004, MOD moved Viettel from under the management of the Signal Corps to the MOD. On 15 October 2004, Viettel launched 098 mobile service.

On 6 April 2005, the company changed its name to Military Telecommunications Corporation under the management of MOD and its subordinate Centers and Factories were transformed into Subsidiaries. In 2006, Viettel established Viettel Cambodia supplying international call service, Internet and leased line services in Cambodia. In 2007, Viettel introduced many key subsidiaries namely Viettel Telecom Corporation (by merging three large companies in Long-distance, Internet and Mobile), Viettel Technology Center and Viettel Global Investment Joint Stock. In 2008, Viettel actively promoted their CSR activities such as sponsoring "We are soldiers" TV show, "Nhu chua he co cuoc chia ly" TV Show, "Trai tim cho em", "Operation Smile", and so on.

In 2009, Viettel Cambodia in Cambodia and Star Telecom (a partnership between Viettel and Lao Asia Telecom) in Laos went into operation under the brand names of Metfone and Unitel respectively. On 14 December 2009, Military Telecommunications Corporation became Military Telecommunications Group under the management of the MOD. After more than 5 years of providing mobile services, Viettel Mobile held 40% of market share in terms of the quantity of mobile subscribers, which was equivalent to 42.5 million active subscribers.

The logo and the Vietnamese slogan of Viettel before 2021.

=== 2010–2018: A global technology group ===
On 25 March 2010, Viettel launched 3G services in 63 provinces and cities with 8,000 active 3G BTS throughout the country. On 8 September 2011, Viettel launched Natcom telecommunications brand in Haiti after almost one year of preparation, claiming to be the mere company to offer full package of telecommunications services and 3G technology. Natcom was also the only telco that owned the unique international Internet port in Haiti via the 10 Gbit/s cable line to Bahamas and the United States. At the end of 2011, Viettel's production line for telecommunications and information technology (IT) equipment was put into operation. The year of 2011 also marked exceptional milestones in Viettel's research and production such as the successful trial of disaster warning system, the launch of Viettel IDC's Song Than Data Center, and the establishment of Viettel Research and Development Institute. On 5 December 2011, Viettel acquired original EVN Telecom.

On 15 May 2012, Viettel launched Movitel mobile network in Mozambique. At the beginning of October, the first batch of Sumo 2G V6206 mobile phones made by Viettel was officially introduced onto the market. In 2013, at telecommunications and IT forums, the Group's leader declared Viettel's strategic transferral from a mobile network operator to a service provider. In March 2013, Telemor network was launched in Timor Leste. In June 2013, Viettel would supply the PAVN with Vietnamese-made UAVs before the end of the year. In July 2013, Viettel began production of military-grade radio equipment for the PAVN. A short-range UAV known as the VT-Patrol was made before the end of 2013.

In 2014, Nexttel in Cameroon and Bitel in Peru went into business. After 10 years of providing mobile services, Viettel started to focus on IT services, launching many digital services and solutions such as CA - digital signature service, SMAS - school management system, Agri.One - farmer supporting solution, BankPlus – door-to-door money transferring application and so on. On 25 February 2014, the company announced their success in manufacturing UAVs. Also in the same year, instead of sponsoring for various small programs, Viettel focused on large and significant CSR programs such as "Quy bo giong thoat ngheo", "Vi em hieu hoc" and so on.

In March and October, 2015, Viettel launched Lumitel network in Burundi and Halotel in Tanzania. In Vietnam, Viettel is the first telco to pilot 4G services. In November, 2016, Viettel was officially granted the license to supply 4G services in Vietnam, declaring that they were able to produce infrastructure equipment for telecommunications network. Spontaneously, the number of Viettel's international customers hit 35 million. On 18 April 2017, Viettel launched 4G telecommunications network in Vietnam. Thanks to its nationwide coverage of up to 95%, Viettel became the first mobile network operator in the world to have nationwide 4G coverage right after launching. In the middle of 2017, Viettel's real time billing system (vOCS) was applied into practice.

In 2018, Viettel intensified their efforts to contribute to the development of e-Government with flagship products such as national immunization information management system, national population database, smart city, and national single window portal. On 19 July 2017, Viettel was officially recognized by the Government as a Defense and Security Enterprise. On 5 January 2018, Military Telecommunications Group changed their name to Military Industry – Telecommunication Group. In March 2018, Viettel introduced their virtual server service entitled Viettel StartCloud, soaring to the leading position in the Data center and Cloud market. In June, 2018, the 10th international brand of Viettel was launched in Myanmar under the brand name of Mytel.

In August 2018, Viettel entered the 4th development stage: 4.0 and Global Business, aiming to maintaining the growth rate of 10-15%, becoming a global technology and business group, and continuing to lead the telecommunication and high-technology markets in Vietnam.

=== 2018–: Digital service provider ===
At the beginning of December 2018, Viettel successfully activated the NB-IoT based infrastructure with the first 30 BTS in Hanoi, claiming the title of first telco in Vietnam to successfully deploy commercial IoT network. In the first half of 2019, Viettel also launched many corporations and companies which are strategic in their 4th stage namely Viettel Business Solutions Corporation, Viettel Cyber Security, Viettel Hi-Tech Industries Corporation and Viettel Digital Services Corporation.

In April 2019, Viettel completed the integration of the first 5G infrastructure in Hoan Kiem Lake area (Hanoi) and triumphantly tested broadcasting 5G service on the frequency bands licensed by the Ministry of Information and Communications. On 10 May 2019, Viettel and Ericsson Group made the first official connection on 5G network in Vietnam. In June 2019, Viettel++, Viettel's largest customer care program ever, became operational. At the end of the same month, e-Cabinet platform, an information system to serve the Cabinet's meetings and work processing, was launched after more than three months of preparation. At the launching ceremony, Mr. Le Dang Dung, Viettel's Acting President and Chief Executive Officer, committed their restless efforts in accompanying the Government to develop a digital society as well as e-Government system in Vietnam. In July 2019, Viettel entered technological ride-hailing market with MyGo application and launched an e-commerce website at VoSo.vn. At the end of the month, Viettel declared their intention to turn Mocha into a super application for music, films, videos, news, games, etc. Mocha would also be connected with other applications within Viettel's ecosystem. In August 2019, at Vietnam ICT Summit 2019, Viettel and large IT enterprises in Vietnam established the Vietnam Digital Transformation Alliance whose Chairman is Major General Le Dang Dung, Viettel's Acting President cum Chief Executive Officer.

In September 2019, Viettel declared that it would broadcast 5G network and deploy Internet of Things (IoT) infrastructure in Ho Chi Minh City. In Ho Chi Minh City, Viettel completed the construction of 1,000 NB-IoT stations with 100% coverage across the city and 5G coverage across Ward 12, District 10. Ho Chi Minh City became the first city in the country to have seamless 5G and IoT coverage. According to the Global System for Mobile Communications Association (GSMA), Viettel is the only Vietnamese enterprise to rank among the first 50 network operators to successfully deploy 5G technology in the world. This was done without support from Chinese firms such as Huawei and ZTE, the first company in the world to not endorse Chinese 5G technology, which got praises and controversies altogether.

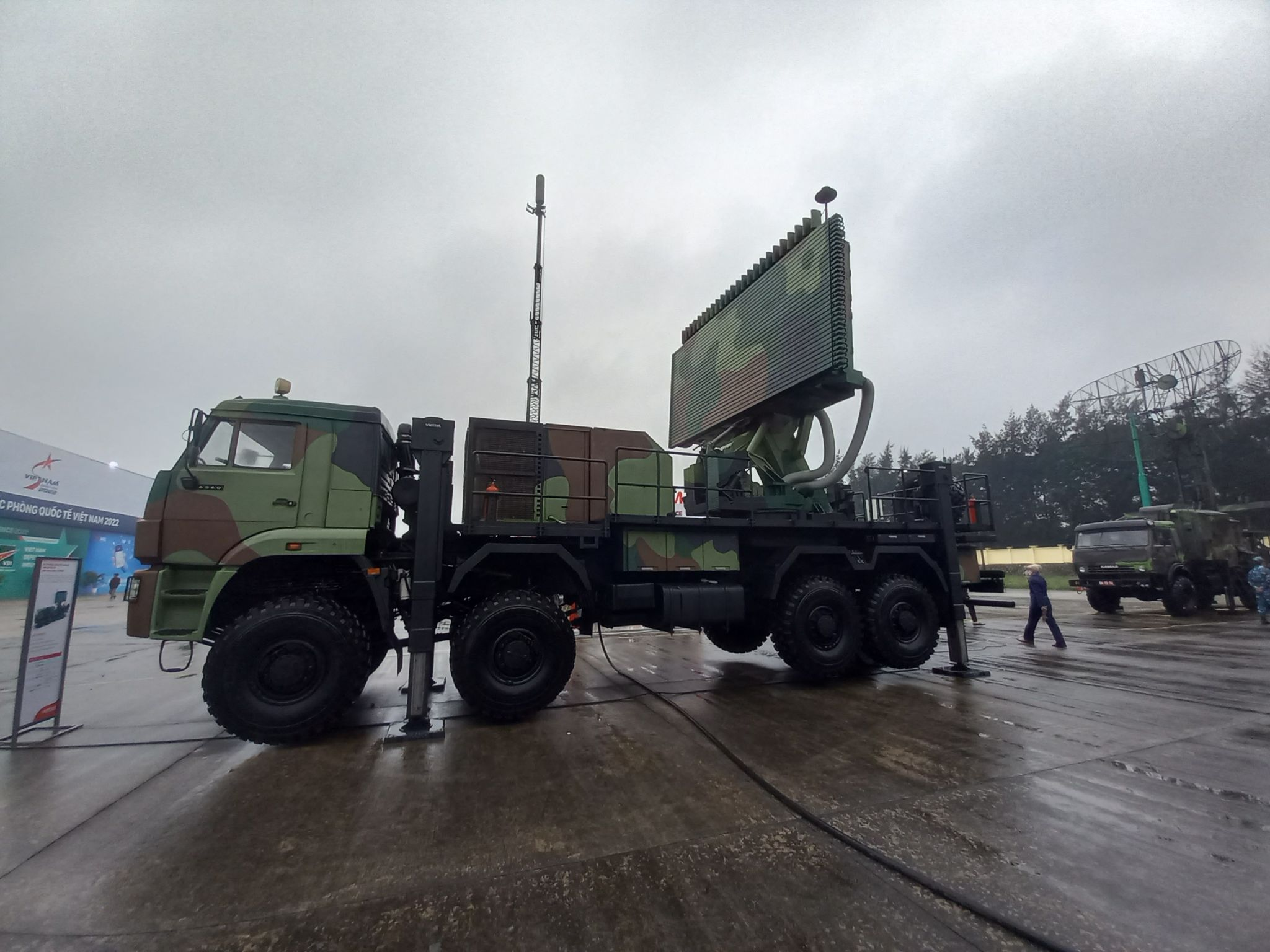
The VRS-MRS 3D air-defence radar developed by Viettel.

On 16 September 2020, Viettel showed off a dummy model of an armed UAV on display in Hanoi. On 27 October 2023, Viettel introduced its first domestically-developed 5G DFE chip, claiming that the product has an equivalent complexity to the Apple A7 SoC.

== Member companies ==
List of subsidiaries of Viettel Group:

1. Telecommunications and Construction:

- Viettel Telecom Corporation
- Viettel Network Corporation
- Viettel Global Corporation
- Viettel Construction Joint Stock Corporation
- Viettel Consultancy and Services Joint Stock Company

2. High-Tech and Manufacturing:

- Viettel High Technology Industries Corporation
- Viettel Manufacturing Corporation
- Viettel Aerospace Institute

3. Digital Services and Enterprise Solutions:

- Viettel Business Solutions Corporation
- Viettel Digital Services Corporation

4. Cyberspace and Media:

- Viettel Cyber Security Company
- Viettel Cyberspace Center
- Viettel Media Company

5. Transportation and Education:

- Vietnam Digital Transport Joint Stock Company
- Viettel Academy

6. Postal and Financial Services:

- Viettel Post Joint Stock Corporation
- Viettel Asset Management Company

7. Commerce and Other Fields:

- Viettel Commerce and Import-Export One Member Limited Liability Company
- Viettel-CHT Limited Company
- Campha Cement Joint Stock Company
- Viettel Sports

== Operations ==
=== Vietnam ===
Viettel had a market share (estimated based on revenues) of 40.67% in 2012. Its main competitors are Vinaphone (owned by VNPT) with 30% market share and MobiFone with 17.9%. They control almost 90% of the market, with the rest controlled by Vietnamobile with 8%, Gmobile (formerly Beeline) with 3.2% and S-Fone with 0.1%. Viettel reported having 58.9 million customers, while Vinaphone and MobiFone estimated having 70 million and Gmobile and Vietnamobile 10 million.

Viettel has developed telecommunication services in Laos, Cambodia, Haiti, Mozambique, Peru, Tanzania, Timor-Leste, Cameroon, Burundi and Myanmar.

=== International ===
Map showing countries with Viettel Group presence

Viettel Global Investment JSC (Viettel Global) handles all the countries foreign investments. Viettel has successfully developed telecommunication services in three continents, Asia, Africa and the Americas. It made a profit from its foreign operations for the first time in 2012, mainly based on profits from Cambodia and Laos and recorded a $1.2 billion revenue from foreign operations in 2014.

The company became the first Vietnamese company to provide as one of the official telecommunication services for the Peru national football team during the 2018 FIFA World Cup, the first Vietnamese company to achieve this feat.

Operator	Country	Began operation	Notes	Reference
Unitel	Laos	26 February 2008	Joint operation between Viettel Global and Lao Asia Telecom	
Metfone	Cambodia	19 February 2009	Largest phone operator in Cambodia, with 50% market share	
Natcom	Haiti	10 September 2011	Joint venture between Viettel Global (60%) and Teleco S.A (Haiti) (40%)	
Movitel	Mozambique	10 January 2012	Leading mobile operator; coverage covers over 93% of the country's land area	
Telemor	East Timor	1 July 2013	Owns over 47% of the market share and began making a profit after six months of operation	
Nexttel	Cameroon	12 September 2014	First 3G operator in the country	
Bitel	Peru	16 October 2014	First foreign market where country GDP exceeds Vietnam	
Lumitel	Burundi	30 May 2015	Largest operator in Burundi within 1 month of operation	
Halotel	Tanzania	15 October 2015	Placed over 18,000 km of optic fiber cables	
Mytel	Myanmar	26 August 2017	Vietnam invested US$1,500,000,000 to Mytel	

== Corporate affairs ==
=== Business scope ===
Viettel currently provides the following services and products:

- Products and services in telecommunications, IT, radio, television, and multimedia communications;
- Communication and telecommunications activities;
- E-commerce, post and delivery activities;
- Financial services, payment services, payment intermediaries, monetary intermediaries;
- Games, news websites and social network services;
- Consultancy in management, survey, and design of investment projects;
- Construction and operation of works, equipment, infrastructure of telecommunications, IT and television network;
- Research, development and trading in military equipment and supporting tools for defense and security purposes;
- Research, development and trading in dual-use equipment;
- Scientific research and development activities;
- Research, development and trading in machinery and equipment in telecommunications, IT, television and multimedia communications;
- Research, development and trading in products and services in military cryptography and cyber information security.
- Advertising and market research;
- Management consultancy in launching and trade promotion activities;
- Sports.

=== Revenue and profit ===
Year	Revenue (million VND)	Profit (million VND)
2008	33,000,000	8,600,000
2009	60,211,000	10,290,000
2010	91,561,000	15,500,000
2011	117,301,000	19,780,000
2012	141,418,000	24,500,000
2013	162,886,000	35,086,000
2014	197,000,000	42,000,000
2015	222,700,000	45,800,000
2016	226,558,000	43,200,000
2017	250,800,000	44,000,000
2018	234,500,000	37,600,000
2019	251,000,000	39,000,000
2023	172,519.772	46,330,734

=== Headquarters ===
Viettel's headquarters is located at Lot D26, Lane 3, Ton That Thuyet Street, Yen Hoa Ward, Cau Giay District, Hanoi.

== Controversies ==
=== Mytel ===
Following the 2021 Myanmar coup d'état and subsequent unrest, it was revealed that Viettel actively does business and assists the State Administration Council in cracking down protesters throughout Mytel, a joint-venture that owned by Viettel and the Tatmadaw, as for the result, its Burmese branch was sanctioned by the United States Treasury Department with assets frozen.

Viettel has also been embroiled, indirectly, for having business ties with the Lebanese diversified investment holdings company M1 Group (owned by the Mikati family's Taha and Najib), a supporter of authoritarian regimes in the Middle East, throughout Mytel. M1 Group has also bought Telenor's Myanmar after the Norwegian company exited due to instabilities.

=== Smuggling of US military equipment ===
In June 2015, Bui Quang Huy, a representative of the Viettel Group in the United States, negotiated with the company EO Imaging to purchase missile tracking equipment using video technology. This type of equipment is used for missile launch systems, however Viettel did not have a license to export this equipment from the United States at that time. In August 2015, Bui Quang Huy bought a vibration damping system for the rocket camera. The selling company advised him to comply with ITAR regulations on arms exports. Mr. Huy replied that he did not have time to ask for permission.

On March 10, 2016, Bui Quang Huy proactively contacted a US company called Sandia Technical Supply LLC to start business negotiations. The employees of this company were undercover agents of the Telecommunications Division. The content of the purchase was 11 Teledyne J402-CA-400 jet engines. These engines are used for the AGM-84 Harpoon anti-ship missiles developed by Teledyne for the US Navy. On May 9 and 10, 2016, the two sides signed documents, and Viettel's representative transferred a deposit of $20,000 to Sandia even though there was no export license to Vietnam.

On October 26, 2016, Bui Quang Huy was arrested by US police with an indictment stating two serious criminal charges: illegal smuggling and illegal export of defense equipment. The official trial of this case in September 2017 concluded that Bui Quang Huy had pleaded guilty to illegal smuggling. According to the sentencing document, Mr. Huy said that he "worked under the direction of his employer. Viettel asked him to buy this engine and send it back to Vietnam." This employee was fired by Viettel a few weeks earlier. Viettel's internal investigation sent to the US FCC concluded that Bui Quang Huy's acts of smuggling military equipment were entirely his own initiative and not directed by the company.

== See also ==
- List of mobile network operators
