= Axian Telecom =

Telecommunications and media company

Axian Telecom Limited
- Type: Private
- Industry: Telecommunications, Media
- Founded: 20 June 2003; 23 years ago
- Headquarters: Ebène, Mauritius
- Area served: Africa
- Key people: Hassanein Hiridjee (Founder and (Chairman)); Hassan Jaber (CEO)
- Products: Mobile, broadband, Mobile Financial Services
- Revenue: ▲US$1.1 billion (2023)
- Operating income: ▲US$232 million (2023)
- Net income: ▼US$55 million (2023)
- Total assets: ▲US$3.2 billion (2023)
- Total equity: ▲US$305 million (2023)
- Owner: Axian Group Ltd (100%)
- Website: www.axian-telecom.com

Yas Group, formerly AXIAN Telecom, is a group operating in the telecommunications services, ICT infrastructure and mobile money services across Africa and the Indian ocean. The group started its activities in 2003 and maintains its headquarters in Mauritius and Dubai. AXIAN Telecom was ranked 74th on the Financial Times' 2025 list of Africa's fastest growing companies in Africa. Currently, Yas Group and its operations are active across eleven markets: Tanzania, Madagascar, Togo, Uganda, Senegal, Comoros, the Democratic Republic of the Congo, Reunion, Mayotte, Kenya and Malawi. As of its rebranding to Yas Group, the group's subsidies are Yas, TOA, Stellarix, Silverlinks and Mixx

In 2024, AXIAN Telecom's MNO's rebranded as Yas across Tanzania, Madagascar, Comoros, Senegal and Togo, while it's fintech arms in Tanzania, Togo and Senegal became Mixx. In 2026, AXIAN Telecom announced the change of name to Yas Group.

== History ==
In 2004, AXIAN Telecom, acquired 68% in then Télécom Malagasy, rebranded Telma in 2006 and became Yas Madagascar in 2024 as a pan-African rebranding.

In 2010, MVola, Madagascar's first mobile money service, was launched and received a bank licence in 2021, becoming the country’s first digital bank.

In 2011, TowerCo of Africa (ToA) Madagascar was launched after the carve out of a part of the Yas Madagascar (formerly Telma Madagascar) tower portfolio. In 2021, AXIAN Telecom acquired Ubuntu, a local Ugandan towerco, and rebranded it to TowerCo of Africa Uganda. It also has activities under Towerco Of Africa in the Democratic Republic of Congo and Tanzania. In september 2026, AXIAN Telecom became Yas Group, as an umbrella for its 3 sector of operation, namely: telecom, digital infrastructure and fintech. It is also in line with its major expansion across new markets like Kenya in june 2025 with the acquisition of a minority stake in Jumia, an e-commerce platform, and november the same year with the acquisition of 99.63% of Wananchi Group.

=== Expansion in West Africa ===
AXIAN Telecom acquired a 40% interest in Yas Senegal (formerly Free Senegal and Tigo Senegal) in 2018, in partnership with Xavier Niel (NJJ) and Yerim Sow (Teyliom) from Millicom under Saga Africa Holdings. It became the first operator in Senegal to introduce 5G technology in March 2024, and offer Mobile Money services through its affiliate Mixx Senegal.

A 51% stake in Yas Togo (formerly Togocom) was acquired in 2019 as part of the privatisation of the telecom sector, via a consortium between Axian Telecom and Emerging Capital Partners (“ECP”), which included a stake in Mixx Togo (formerly T-Money), Togocom’s mobile money service. In December 2020, 5G mobile data services launched in Togo.

=== Acquisition in Tanzania ===
In 2022, AXIAN Telecom partnered with Rostam Azizi in a consortium to acquire Millicom’s operations in Tanzania, which included Tigo Tanzania, Tigo Pesa and Zantel. To finance this acquisition, AXIAN Telecom issued its debut $420 million bond. This also included a small portfolio of around 400 sites of TowerCo, which was carved out and handed over to TowerCo of Africa.

=== Other Ventures and Acquisitions ===
In 2025, the Group acquired a 9.97% minority stake in Jumia Technologies AG, listed on the NYSE, Africa’s leading e-commerce and fintech platform.

Also in 2025, Yas completed the acquisition of Wananchi Group – a leading provider of fixed broadband and enterprise connectivity in East Africa, namely: Kenya, Tanzania, Uganda, and Malawi.

== Subsidiaries and investments ==
The companies that compose Axian Telecom include, but are not limited to, are the following:

- Free Sénégal (trading as "Yas Sénégal") – Dakar, Senegal – 78.4% Shareholding – A telecommunication company in Senegal. Acquired in 2020.
- STELLAR-IX Data Centers – Ebène, Mauritius – 100% Shareholding – Holding company for the STELLAR-IX companies. These subsidiaries provide Data center services.
  - STELLAR-IX Tanzania – Dar es Salaam, Tanzania – 80% Shareholding
  - STELLAR-IX Madagascar – Antananarivo, Madagascar – 100% Shareholding
- Telecom Comores – Moroni, Comoros – 43.3% Shareholding – A telecom operator in Comoros. Acquired in 2016.
- Telecom Malagasy SA (Telma) – Antananarivo, Madagascar – 80.8% Shareholding – A telecom operator in Madagascar. Acquired in 2005.
- Telecom Reunion Mayotte – Réunion, France – 50% Shareholding – A telecommunication company operating in Reunion and Mayotte. Acquired in 2015
- Togo Telecom – Lomé, Togo – 51% Shareholding – A telecom operator in Togo. Acquired in 2019.
- Towerco of Africa Ltd – Ebène, Mauritius – 100% Shareholding – Holding company for the Towerco subsidiaries. These subsidiaries construct and operate of telecommunication infrastructures such as base station towers.
  - Towerco of Africa DRC – Kinshasa, DR Congo – 70% Shareholding.
  - TowerCo of Africa Uganda Limited – Kampala, Uganda– 90% Shareholding – Formally known as Ubuntu Towers. Acquired in 2021.
  - Towerco of Africa Madagascar – Antananarivo, Madagascar – 99.7% Shareholding.
  - Towerco of Africa Tanzania Ltd – Dar es Salaam, Tanzania – 80% Shareholding.
- Yas Tanzania (officially known as MIC Tanzania Limited) – Dar es Salaam, Tanzania – 78.4% Shareholding – A telecommunication company in Tanzania. Acquired in 2022 after a treaty with Millicom International Cellular (Tigo).
- Zanzibar Telecom Limited (trading as "Zantel") – Dar es Salaam, Tanzania – 78.4% Shareholding – A telecommunication company in Tanzania. Acquired in 2022

== Ownership ==
Axian Telecom is a wholly owned subsidiary of Axian Group Limited. Axian Group, present in 32 countries and territories of the Indian Ocean and Africa, notably through its direct investments. It operates in five sectors of activity i.e. real estate, telecommunications, finance, energy and innovation. Axian Group is wholly owned by Hassanein Hiridjee, a Malagasy born, French entrepreneur of Khoja decent.

== Governance ==
The seven-member board of directors is chaired by Hassanein Hiridjee. Hassan Jaber, serves as the CEO.

== See also ==
- Millicom
- Free S.A.S
