= Business Times (Tanzania) =

Tanzania Business Times
- Type: Weekly newspaper
- Publisher: Business Times Limited
- Founded: 1988
- Language: English
- Headquarters: Lugoda Street; Gerezani Area; Dar es Salaam, Tanzania
- Sister newspapers: The Tanzania Times, Dar Leo, and Spoti Starehe

The Business Times used to be a weekly Tanzanian newspaper published in Dar es Salaam, the business capital and largest city in the second-largest economy in the East African Community. Together with the Financial Times (published by IPP Media), they were the two exclusively business weekly published in the country.

== Overview ==
The newspaper is no longer in print, but much of its news content seems to have been assimilated in The Tanzania Times, which has now taken over the publication alongside the former Arusha Times which used to cover the Northern Tanzania zone.

covers investment and business news in Tanzania. It was published in English and had a broadsheet print version.

== History ==
The paper used to be published by Business Times Limited, a company founded in 1988, which also produced three other papers: (a) Majira, a daily news publication in Kiswahili (b) Dar Leo, another news daily, also in Kiswahili and (c) Spoti Starehe, a weekly sports newspaper in Kiswahili.

== See also ==
- List of newspapers in Tanzania
- Media in Tanzania
