= Indians in Madagascar =

Indians in Madagascar: Karàna
Total population
- 25,000

Regions with significant populations
- Antananarivo

Languages
- Gujarati, Sindhi, Kutchi, English, Telugu, Tamil, French, Malagasy, Hindi, Languages of India

Religion
- Primarily Isma'ili Islam

Related ethnic groups
- Overseas Indians

The so-called 'Karana or Karane' are a generally Muslim racial group in Madagascar with a long history on the island. A large proportion of them arrived on the north-west port of Mahajanga in the early 1880s.

The Malagasy term Karana mainly refers to Khoja (a Muslim tribe which was once based on the Indian subcontinent) families on the island who play a leading role in the Madagascar business sector. The term does, however, sometimes include Indian and occasionally even Pakistani (extremely few in number) families though the Khoja make up the sizeable majority. Though they have contributed greatly to the nation's development, unlike their counterparts, the Al-Lawatia in Oman, they do not enjoy the same level of acceptance and freedom with kidnappings rife and a lack of acceptance into the institution both politically and otherwise.

Estimates of Karana population is 400,000. The group migrated from the Indian subcontinent somewhere between five and fifteen generations ago, spearheaded by the Khoja tribe with many Indians joining alongside.

Among those that are commonly referred on to as 'Indians in Madagascar' today, are 867 non-resident Indians, with the rest most probably being those locally-born descendants of early immigrants Khojas or Indians. They form a minority ethnic group in Madagascar.

== History ==
By the 1780s, a community of roughly 200 Indian traders had formed at Mahajanga, a port on the north-west coast of Madagascar, near Bombetoka Bay at the mouth of the Betsiboka River. Confusion arose over their legal status; they often declared themselves to be Malagasy subjects in order to evade the laws against slave-holding or the building of stone houses, both forbidden to British subjects, while their dhows, which they used to transport goods to and from the African mainland, flew French flags. French Khoja families today come from once Madagascar-based communities when the nation was part of the French Empire and those under it French citizens.

In fact, even those families still based in Madagascar today are almost all French with links between the two still intact and regular travel between the French republic and the Great Red Island occurring due to business interests and education amongst other factors. It is not uncommon for a Frenchman of Khoja ethnicity to view Madagascar as the 'land of his ancestors'.

Initial arrivals to the island were mainly Muslim Twelver Khojas, Ismailis and Daoudi Bohras, with some Hindus settling later. The 1911 census found 4,480 Indians in the country, making them 21% of the total foreign population and the second-largest foreign population after the French. Following the nationalisation of private businesses in the 1970s, many were compelled to leave; those who remained were largely uneducated, but stayed on and gradually built their businesses. By 2000, they were generally believed to control 50-60% of the country's economy, making them the target of demonstrators during periods of unrest.

== Business ==
Financial interests of the community on the island are diversified. Businessmen Ylias Akbaraly and Hassanein Hiridjee are members of this community.

== See also ==
- Chinese people in Madagascar
- Hinduism in Madagascar
- Islam in Madagascar
- Demographics of Madagascar
- India–Madagascar relations

== Sources ==
- A., Kathirasen (2001-07-31), "A vibrant minority: The Chinese and Indians, who make up a tiny minority in Madagascar, are doing very well for themselves", New Straits Times, Singapore, archived from the original on 2012-10-22 – via HighBeam Research
- Martin, Frederick (1916), "Madagascar", The Statesman's Year-book: The Statesman's Year-book: Statistical and Historical Annual of the States of the World for the Year 1916, St. Martin's Press, pp. 905–908
- Oliver, Samuel Pasfield (1885), The True Story of the French Dispute in Madagascar, Unwin
- Singhvi, L. M. (2000), "Other Countries of Africa", Report of the High Level Committee on the Indian Diaspora (PDF), New Delhi: Ministry of External Affairs, pp. 89–109, archived from the original (PDF) on 2012-02-06
