= Sitholizwe Mdlalose =

Zimbabwean accountant and corporate executive

- Born: 1980 (age 45–46)
- Education: Christian Brothers College, Bulawayo
- Alma mater: University of South Africa; Harvard University
- Occupations: Accountant and Corporate Executive
- Known for: Business expertise
- Title: Chief Executive Officer; Vodacom Tanzania

Sitholizwe Mdlalose is a Zimbabwean accountant and corporate executive who was appointed as Chief Executive Officer of Vodacom South Africa, effective 1 July 2022. Before that he was chief executive officer of Vodacom Tanzania, having previously served as director of finance at Vodacom South Africa, between 2017 and August 2021.

== Background and education ==
Sitholizwe is a Zimbabwean national. He received a Bachelor of Accountancy (B.Compt) degree, from the University of South Africa in 2002. He is also a qualified Chartered Accountant (ACCA), recognized by the Institute of Chartered Accountants in England and Wales. In addition, he has successfully undertaken the Senior Executive Programme at Harvard School of Business.

== Career ==
From 1999, while an undergraduate at UNISA and for the four and one half years until August 2003, Sithole was assigned to Deloitte Zimbabwe, as a Trainee Chartered Accountant, based in Harare, the capital city of Zimbabwe.

Following that, he spent one and half years at Family Impact Zimbabwe, a non-government organisation that supports vulnerable families, based in Bulawayo, Zimbabwe's second largest city. While there, he served as the Country Director for the NGO. He then relocated to Reading, in the United Kingdom, where he was hired by Ernst & Young as a Client Service Manager, for two years.

He joined Vodafone in January 2007 and worked in various roles in the United Kingdom, including as finance manager, Head of Internal Audit Unit and as Senior Finance Manager: Africa, Middle East & Asia Pacific Regions. After nearly seven years at Vodafone, he relocated to South Africa in August 2013.

He joined Vodacom South Africa in August 2013. While there, he was given progressively increasing senior executive roles including (a) Internal Audit Managing Executive for the 7 units reporting to the Vodacom Group Audit, Risk & Compliance Committee (ARCC) Chairman (b) Acting Chief Operating Officer, International Business (c) Chief Financial Officer: International Business (d) Interim Group Chief Financial Officer, Vodacom Group Limited and (e) Finance Director, Vodacom South Africa Pty Limited. The period he spent at Vodacom in South Africa is reported as 8 years and 3 months.

== Other considerations ==
At Vodacom South Africa, Sitholozwe replaced Balesh Sharma. At Vodacom Tanzania, Sitholizwe replaced Hisham Hendi who took up a new position at Vodafone in Spain. Sitho, as sometimes his first name is abbreviated, was based in Dar es Salaam, Tanzania's business capital, when he was CEO of Vodacom Tanzania. He is now based in Johannesburg, South Africa.
