= Hassanein Hiridjee =

French-Malagasy entrepreneur (born 1975)

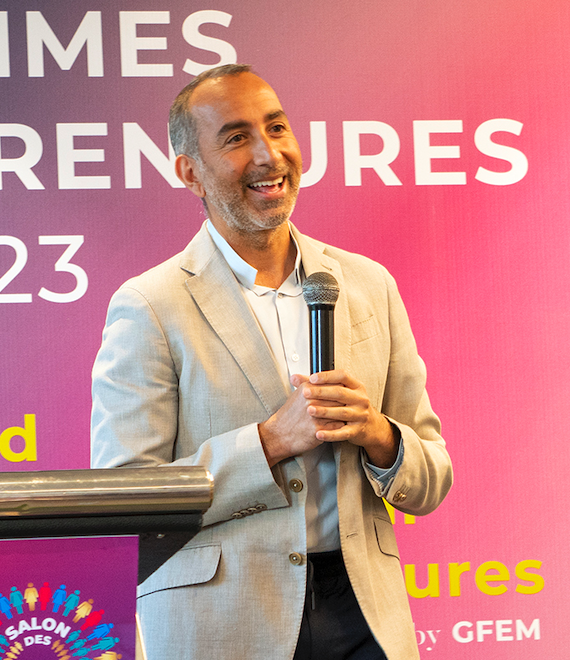
- Hassanein Hiridjee in March 2023
- Born: 1975 (age 50–51); Antananarivo, Madagascar
- Organization: Axian Group
- Title: CEO

Hassanein Hiridjee (born in 1975 in Antananarivo) is a French-Malagasy entrepreneur. He is the CEO of the panafrican group Axian.

== Biography ==
=== Education ===
Hassanein Hiridjee comes from a Khoja (locally known as Karane) family who settled in Madagascar. He graduated from the Tananarive French Lycée in 1992. He then graduated from the ESCP Business School in Paris.

=== Career ===
In France, he held several positions in the financial sector before returning to Madagascar. In 1997, he joined the family business initially named Hirimix, founded by his uncles. In December 2015, the company was renamed Axian. Axian is now active in the telecom, energy, real estate and financial services sectors globally. Its expansion beyond Madagascar began in the Indian Ocean and then Africa more widely through forming a presence in Tanzania with the takeover of the operations of Tigo (Milicom SA), in Togo in entering TOGOCOM's capital, in Senegal with a partnership with Xavier Niel, and also in the Ivory Coast.

=== Civil society involvement ===
In 2017, through Axian Group, he started a foundation called Fondation H which aims to promote the art and practice of African artists internationally. The Fondation H gallery in Marais, Paris has been open since September 2020. In May 2023, a new gallery was inaugurated in Antananarivo, Madagascar.

== Distinctions ==
At the Africa CEO Forum 2022 organized by Jeune Afrique Media Group, he was named "CEO of the year". This award recognizes the CEO who has had the biggest impact in Africa over that year.

== Panama Papers ==
One of the directors of the Axian Group and uncle of Hassanein Hiridjee, Raza-Aly Hiridjee, is cited in the Panama Papers financial scandal and allegedly owns a shell corporation in the British Virgin Islands, one of the largest tax havens in the world.
