= Star TV (Tanzanian TV channel) =

Star TV Tanzania is a Tanzanian television station with a wide range of broadcast content. It is based in Mwanza, near Lake Victoria, and maintains offices in Dar es Salaam.

In 2003, Star TV broadcast 24 hours a day, in both English and Swahili languages and had contracts with Dar es Salaam Television, Channel Ten (both private television channels), Deutsche Welle, the BBC, Worldnet and Sky News.

== See also ==
- Media of Tanzania
