= Christian Brothers College, Bulawayo =

Independent secondary school in Zimbabwe

- Christian Brothers College Logo

Location
- Old Esigodini Road, Matsheumhlope; Bulawayo; Zimbabwe; 20°11′S 28°38′E

Information
- Type: Independent secondary school
- Motto: Viriliter Age (Latin: Act Manfully)
- Denomination: Roman Catholic
- Established: July 1953
- Founder: Christian Brothers
- Headmaster: Kizito Muhomba
- Forms: 1–6
- Gender: Boys
- Enrollment: 596 (2016)
- Houses: Patricians(Green); Georgians(Red); Davidians(Yet); Andrians Blue
- Tuition: US$2,400.00 (Note: Termly fees, the year has 3 terms.)
- Affiliations: ATS; CHISZ
- Website: www.cbcbyo.org

St. Patrick's Christian Brothers College, Bulawayo, commonly referred to as Christian Brothers College (CBC), is a private boys-only high school located in Bulawayo, Zimbabwe. It is a member of the Association of Trust Schools (ATS) and the Headmaster is a member of the Conference of Heads of Independent Schools in Zimbabwe (CHISZ). The school is considered amongst the best in Africa. It is located in Bulawayo, Zimbabwe's second largest city.

Sitting on land whose perimeter is 1,966m, the school provides many activities, both academic and extra-curricular. It has 6 outdoor tennis courts, 2 hockey fields, 3 rugby fields, cricket nets, 2 soccer fields, indoor squash courts as well as 2 basketball courts.

== Notable alumni ==
- Graham Boynton – journalist
- David Coltart – Mayor of Bulawayo, former Member of Parliament, Senator, Minister of Education, Sport and Culture of Zimbabwe
- Charles Coventry – Zimbabwean cricketer former holder of the ODI world record for the highest individual score
- Mark Dekker – Zimbabwean cricketer
- Adrian Garvey – Springbok rugby player
- Tony Johnstone – professional golfer
- Alexander McCall Smith – author of The No. 1 Ladies' Detective Agency Series.
- Keegan Meth – Zimbabwean cricketer
- Obi Mhondera - Songwriter, producer and re-mixer
- Sitholizwe Mdlalose - Managing director at Vodacom South Africa
- Daniel Rowland – Zimbabwean ultra marathon runner
- Denis Streak - cricketer
- Mike Williams - Leicester Tigers Rugby Union
- John W. Dold - mathematician

== Notable staff ==
- John Eppel – award-winning author

== See also ==
- List of schools in Zimbabwe
