= ZBC TV (Zanzibar) =

Television station in Zanzibar, Tanzania

ZBC TV formerly Television Zanzibar (TVZ), is a television station of the Zanzibar Broadcasting Commission in Zanzibar, Tanzania. It was the first colour television station south of Sahara. It is a state-owned broadcasting station which produces and transmits development-oriented programs.

== History ==
TVZ was endorsed in 1972 by the first president of Zanzibar, Sheikh Abeid Amani Karume, using PAL system, and broadcasts in Swahili and English. Second President of Zanzibar Sheikh Aboud Jumbe Mwinyi inaugurated TVZ on 12 January 1974 as one main events in commemoration of 10th anniversary of Zanzibar Revolution. It broadcast little more than two hours a day (7pm to 9:15pm) on UHF channel 21. Simultaneously, a second transmitter went operational in Pemba Island on VHF channel 12. It carries local and international programmes. The station is located at Karume House building. The building was renovated in 1972 when it was turned into a TV studio and was meant to be temporary. Because of financial constraints the government could not put up another TV studio structure to date.

As of 1994, TVZ spent little on buying foreign programming. Its operation status was in decay, with obsolete Philips equipment in use for twenty years, as well as an air conditioning system also from Philips, but without repair parts, and other equipment gathering dust.

== Mission ==
The mission of Television Zanzibar is information, education and entertainment to the public taking into consideration their interests. Since its inception the motto for Television Zanzibar has remained "ELIMU KWA TELEVISHENI" ("Education through Television"), the idea which stemmed from Sheikh Abeid Aman Karume.

== Coverage ==
TVZ covers the whole of both Unguja and Pemba islands and its signal reaches Dar es Salaam, Tanga, Bagamoyo and the coastal belt of Tanzania mainland up to Mombasa in Kenya. Despite being the first colour TV station in Africa, the station has never broadcast via satellite unlike other TV stations in Tanzania, meaning that it is not as widely available internationally. The space for the implementation of TV activities has long been insufficient and it has now become worse as production spaces, news room, program production space and others do not satisfy the needs of a modern TV studio.

== See also ==
- Media of Tanzania
