= VT-Patrol =

Vietnamese unmanned aerial vehicle

VT-Patrol is a short-range military unmanned aerial vehicle (UAV) manufactured by Viettel, a major telecommunications and defense firm in Vietnam and also a R&D company of the People's Army of Vietnam. It saw its maiden flight in 2013.

== Specifications ==
Each VT-Patrol has a height of 0.78 m and a length of 2.31 m. It also has a wingspan of 3.35 m, a weight of 26 kg, a velocity of 100–150 km/h, and an operational range of 50 km. High-definition and infrared camera sources can identify enemies within 600 m. The UAV was planned to enter service in 2013, and other plans for bigger Vietnamese designed-and-made UAVs are still on the way.
