= Movitel, SA =

Movitel
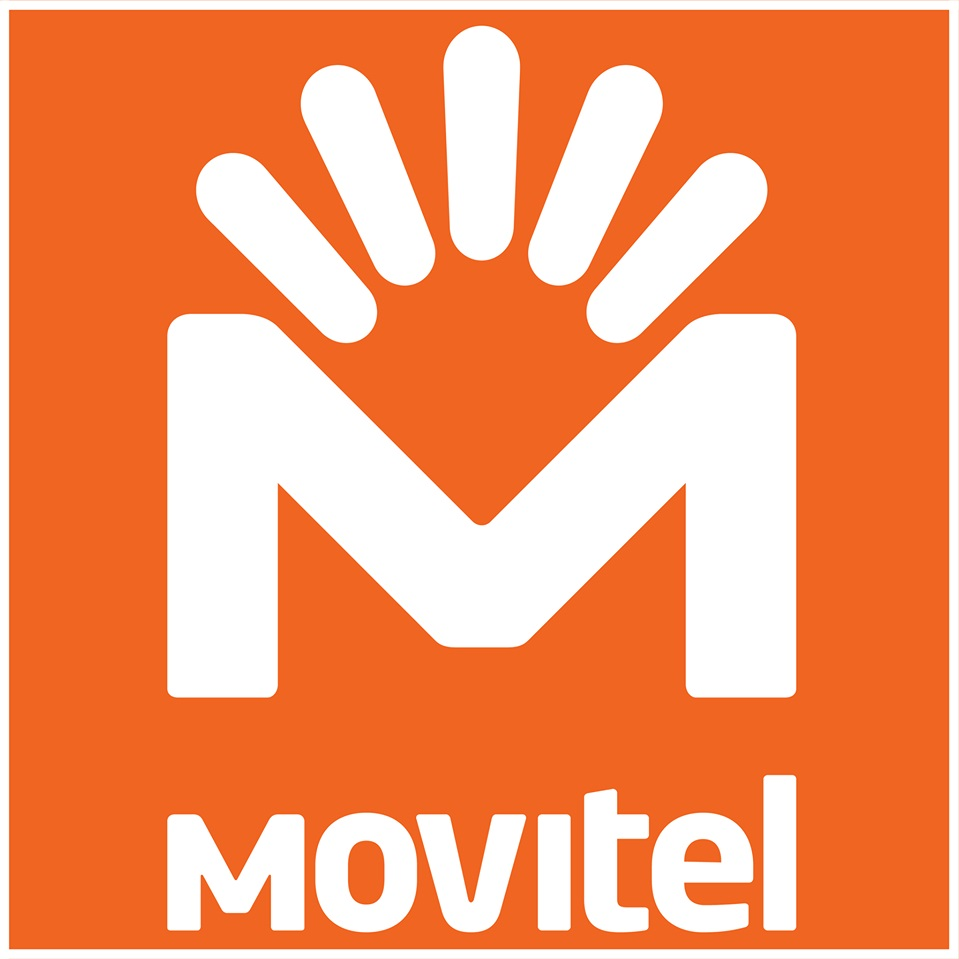
- Company type: S.A
- Industry: Telecommunications
- Founded: 15 May 2012
- Headquarters: Av. Guerra Popular 1086, Maputo, Mozambique
- Products: GSM-related products Internet services
- Owner: Viettel Group
- Number of employees: 2,521 (October 2015)
- Website: movitel.co.mz

Movitel is a mobile Telecommunication operator based in Mozambique, in Maputo. It has 12 subsidiaries distributed among 11 provinces, 127 district centers and more than 1,500 employees. The project is a partnership between the Vietnamese company Viettel and Mozambique's SPI (Management and Investment).

== Overview ==
Movitel operation began after winning a public tender in 2010 to operate as another mobile telecommunications company in the Mozambican market. The company started building its infrastructure in 2011, at first with a total of 12,500 kilometers long optical fiber cable and 1,800 antennas that supported services in 2G and 3G.

== Timeline ==
2010 - Movitel wins competition as the third operator in Mozambique;

2011 - Starts build its infrastructure across the country;

2012 - Launches officially its services;

2013 - Movitel receives the award for Competitive Strategy Leadership by the Company for Research and Consultancy Frost & Sullivan;

2014 - Movitel received the award for best operator in emerging countries; Movitel offers the INGC - National Institute of Disaster Management $200,000 to support the Chokwe district, devastated by the floods.

2015 - provides food baskets to the population of Zambézia devastated by floods, an estimated value of $200 000; It offers smart rooms to the Ministry of Education and Human Development, composed of a set of 200 computers and 12 projectors.

2016 - Received President of Socialist Republic of Vietnam, Trương Tấn Sang, using Video Conference system to make a meeting with all the Vietnamese who live in Mozambique.

== See also ==
- Halotel
- Lumitel
- Viettel Mobile
