= Mass media in Tanzania =

Mass media in Tanzania includes print, radio, television, and the Internet. The "Tanzania Communications Regulatory Act" of 2003 created the Tanzania Communications Regulatory Authority, which oversees broadcast licensing. The Media Council of Tanzania began in 1995.

== Radio ==
- Fasihi Media House
- Clouds FM
- East Africa Radio
- Kiss FM
- Wasafi Fm
- Praise Power FM
- Choice FM
- Mbeya Highlands FM
- Orkonerei Radio Service
- Parapanda Radio Tanzania
- Radio Free Africa
- Radio One
- Radio Tanzania
- Radio Tanzania Zanzibar
- Radio Tumaini
- Radio Uhuru
- Tanzania Broadcasting Corporation
- Voice of Tanzania-Zanzibar
- Radio Karagwe FM - Sauti ya Wananchi.KARAGWE-KAGERA

== Tanzanian Radio Presenters ==
- Mamy Baby
- Frida Amani
- Salim Kikeke
- Millard Ayo
- Meena Ally
- Adam Mchomvu
- Maulid Kitenge
- Lilommy

== Television ==
State TV Tanzania Broadcasting Corporation known as TBC launched in 2001, several years after the first private station.

Current TV networks and stations include:

- East Africa TV
- Mambo TV Swahili
- Clouds TV
- Wasafi TV
- Ebenezer TV
- Barmedas TV
- TV E
- Al Itrah Broadcasting Network Television (IBN TV)
- Coastal Television Network
- Dar es Salaam Television
- Independent Television
- Kwanza TV
- Star TV
- Tanzania Broadcasting Corporation
- Televishini ya Taifa (TVT)
- TV1 (Tanzania)
- TVZ (TV Zanzibar)
- MAHAASIN TV

== See also ==
- Disappearance of Azory Gwanda
- Telecommunications in Tanzania
- Tanzanian literature

== Bibliography ==
- Graham L. Mytton (1968). "Tanzania: the Problems of Mass Media Development". Gazette. 14 (2): 89–100. doi:10.1177/001654926801400204.
- Dele Ogunade (1986). "Mass Media Systems of Kenya and Tanzania: a Comparative Analysis". Africa Media Review. 1 (1). Archived from the original on 2020-11-21 – via Michigan State University Libraries, African e-Journals Project.
- "Tanzania: Directory". Africa South of the Sahara 2003. Regional Surveys of the World. Europa Publications. 2003. p. 1083. ISBN 9781857431315. ISSN 0065-3896. (Includes information about radio, newspapers, etc.)
- Toyin Falola; Daniel Jean-Jacques, eds. (2015). "Tanzania: Media". Africa: an Encyclopedia of Culture and Society. ABC-CLIO. ISBN 978-1-59884-666-9.
- "Tanzania", Freedom of the Press, USA: Freedom House, 2016, archived from the original on 2019-02-16
- "Licence to blog", BBC News, 24 April 2018 ("Bloggers in Tanzania will have to pay $920 (£660) for the privilege of posting content online, according to new regulations.")
