= .tz =

Internet country code top-level domain for Tanzania

- Introduced: 14 July 1995
- TLD type: Country code top-level domain
- Status: Active
- Registry: TCRA
- Sponsor: TCRA
- Intended use: Entities connected with Tanzania
- Actual use: Gets some use in Tanzania
- Registration restrictions: Must have demonstrable intent to use name on Internet; vanity and placemark registrations not permitted; one registration per organization; must have secondary name server on different backbone
- Structure: Registrations are at second or third level beneath some second-level labels
- Dispute policies: Registration disclaimer requires registrants to indemnify the registry for any trademark or other litigation regarding a domain
- DNSSEC: Yes
- Registry website: TCRA

.tz is the Internet country code top-level domain for Tanzania. Through a consultative process, Tanzania Network information Centre (tzNIC), a not-for-profit company was established and registered (in 2006) to administer and manage the operations of the Tanzania country code top-level domain. tzNIC is a limited company (by guarantee) with two founding members – the Tanzania Communication Regulatory Authority (the regulator) and the Tanzania Internet Service Provider Association.

On 29 April 2010, the .tz top-level domain was transferred to tzNIC. On 18 October 2018, the members of tzNIC passed a resolution to liquidate itself and agreed to "execute the process of transferring the tzNIC functions to TCRA". The decision was made after they confirmed that tzNIC had not fulfilled its financial sustainability goal and that the TCRA could no longer financially support it. The resolution recognized that the "only way forward in compliance with the law was for tzNIC's functions to be absorbed within TCRA in such a way that same present tzNIC staff would continue managing and administering the same .tz registry infrastructure within TCRA".

From July 1995 until March 2022, registrations were permitted only at the third level beneath the following second-level names:

- .co.tz – commercial
- .ac.tz – schools granting baccalaureate degrees
- .go.tz – governmental entities
- .or.tz – not-for-profit organizations
- .mil.tz – exclusively for Tanzania Military entities recognized by the Ministry responsible for Defence
- .sc.tz – schools that are elementary, primary and secondary level institutions
- .ne.tz – network infrastructure

On 1 March 2022 and effective on 1 July of that year, Tanzania's Ministry of Information, Communication, and Information Technology began to allow registrations at the top-level domain .tz without the use of a second-level domain such as .co.tz. The ministry also removed the requirement for registrants to have a local presence in Tanzania.

Additional second-level names were added on Tuesday, 14 February 2012:

- .hotel.tz – hotel operators
- .mobi.tz – mobile phone operators
- .tv.tz – television operators and stations
- .info.tz – informational sites such as museums
- .me.tz – individuals

On 1 March 2022 the Tanzania Communication Regulatory Authority opened .tz second-level domain registration in parallel with other third-level domains such as .co.tz, .or.tz etc. At that time, registration was allowed only to priority groups, until 1 July 2022 when .tz second domain registration was opened to the general public. Priority groups were existing third-level .tz domain owners (those registered before 1 March 2022) and trademark owners. Unlike third-level domains, the second-level domain is a premium .tz domain, elegant, easy to remember and sounds more professional than other third-level domains. Registration of .tz follows similar processes as other .tz domains, and can be done via any TCRA accredited registrars. For the second-level domain, there is reserved list, and TCRA have blocked registration for some common or popular names in order to prevent conflicts.
