= Airtel Tanzania =

Mobile network operator in Tanzania

- Type: Public
- Industry: Telecommunications
- Predecessors: Zain Tanzania; Celtel Tanzania
- Founded: 8 June 2010; 16 years ago
- Headquarters: Ali Hassan Mwinyi Road, north Dar es Salaam, east Tanzania
- Area served: Tanzania
- Products: Mobile telephony Broadband; Internet services
- Parent: Airtel Africa
- Website: www.airtel.co.tz

The Airtel Tanzania headquarters

Airtel Tanzania Limited is the third-largest mobile network operator in Tanzania operated by Airtel Africa, which is a subsidiary of Bharti Airtel of India, behind Vodacom Tanzania and Tigo Tanzania. As of September 2017, Airtel Tanzania had 10.6 million voice subscribers. As of December 2017 according to data provided by the Tanzania Communications Regulatory Authority, Airtel Tanzania controlled 27.1 percent of Tanzania's mobile telephone market by customer numbers, at that time estimated at 10.86 million.

The company is a component of Airtel Africa, the pan African mobile network operator and the largest mobile service provider in Africa outside of South Africa, active in 14 countries on the continent.

Airtel Tanzania was the first telecom company to launch General Packet Radio Service/Enhanced Data Rates for GSM Evolution (GPRS/EDGE) service in Tanzanian Market on 3 April 2006. Celtel Tanzania has its headquarters in Celtel House, Dar es Salaam. On 1 August 2008, Celtel rebranded all of its African operations under the Zain name.

== History ==
Airtel Tanzania was the result of partial privatization of TTCL on 23 February 2001. This was one of the first steps towards full liberalization of the market. In the aftermath, Celtel International, at that time MSI, which has its headquarters in Amsterdam, Netherlands, together with Detecon from Germany, obtained 35% shares from the Government of Tanzania. Thus, the consortium (Celtel International and Detecon) took over Board and Management control of TTCL and thus made it essentially an autonomous company. Celtel is currently owned by sub group originating from UAE.

=== License ===
Celtel Tanzania was licensed as the mobile operator in the country in November 2001. The license was the result of Tanzania Communications Commission (TCC) to decide and to change its zonal licenses into national licenses in 1998. The changes was because the numbers of subscribers in the country was very low (i.e. a total of 37,940 in 1998) and operators were concentrating on a few zones only (i.e. the coastal area near Dar es Salaam and Zanzibar).

=== Celtel Tanzania partnership ===
During the privatisation of Tanzania Telecommunications Company Limited (TTCL), Celtel International was in partnership with Detecon of Germany. The two companies invested an initial $60 million in TTCL in February 2001 for a 35% shareholding in TTCL. In the new partnership with TTCL, Celtel International agreed to be bound by independent "Expert Determination" in the aftermath of a poor financial performance of TTCL for the year 2000. Based on this "Expert Determination", Celtel International made an additional $4.96 million payment.

In early August 2005, Celtel Tanzania and TTCL were legally separated, allowing each to administer its own financial and business operations. In this new formally signed agreement between the Tanzanian Government and Celtel Tanzania, TTCL's shareholding structure remained unchanged, with the government of Tanzania holding 65% and Celtel International the remaining 35%. In the aftermath, Celtel Tanzania's structure was changed so as to follow the government’s decision to sell a 25% stake in the cellco to Celtel International for USD28 million.

=== Acquisition by Zain ===
In September 2007 Celtel's Parent Company MTC Group was acquired by Zain (Arabic for 'beautiful, good and wonderful') unifying its different brands in 22 Countries. This led to the rebranding of Celtel Tanzania to Zain Tanzania.

=== Acquisition by Bharti Airtel ===
On 8 June 2010, Bharti Airtel struck a deal to purchase of mobile operations in 15 African countries from Zain, a Kuwaiti operator including Zain Tanzania, but excluding Zain Sudan. The firm then changed its name to Airtel Tanzania.

== Current ownership ==
Following talks in Dar es Salaam, between John Magufuli, the president of Tanzania and Sunil Mittal, the chairman of Bharti Airtel, held in January 2019, the India-based conglomerate agreed to cede more shareholding to the government, in order to settle existing ownership disputes. Following the agreed transfer of shares, the ownership in the company will appear as illustrated in the table below.

Shareholding in Airtel Tanzania stock
Rank	Name of owner	% ownership before January 2019	% ownership after January 2019
1	Bharti Airtel of India	60.0	51.0
2	Government of Tanzania	40.0	49.0
	Total	100.00	100.00

== One Network ==
Airtel Africa coverage

As of January 2016, Airtel Africa operates in 17 African countries. Marketed as "One Network", airtel was the first telecom company in Africa to provide a border less solution for its customer across the continent. With this service airtel customer can freely roam in other airtel operating countries and use their phone as a local subscriber. This service has been extended to India, Bangladesh and Sri Lanka where airtel Africa users would not have to change their sim cards to operate freely in the three Asian nations.

Recharging while roaming on the "One Network" can be done both in local currency or can be done remotely from one's home country. The airtel money services do not work across borders. However, there are plans to implement airtel money between Kenya and Tanzania.
