= Lil Ommy =

Tanzanian media personality

Omary Rajabu Tambwe
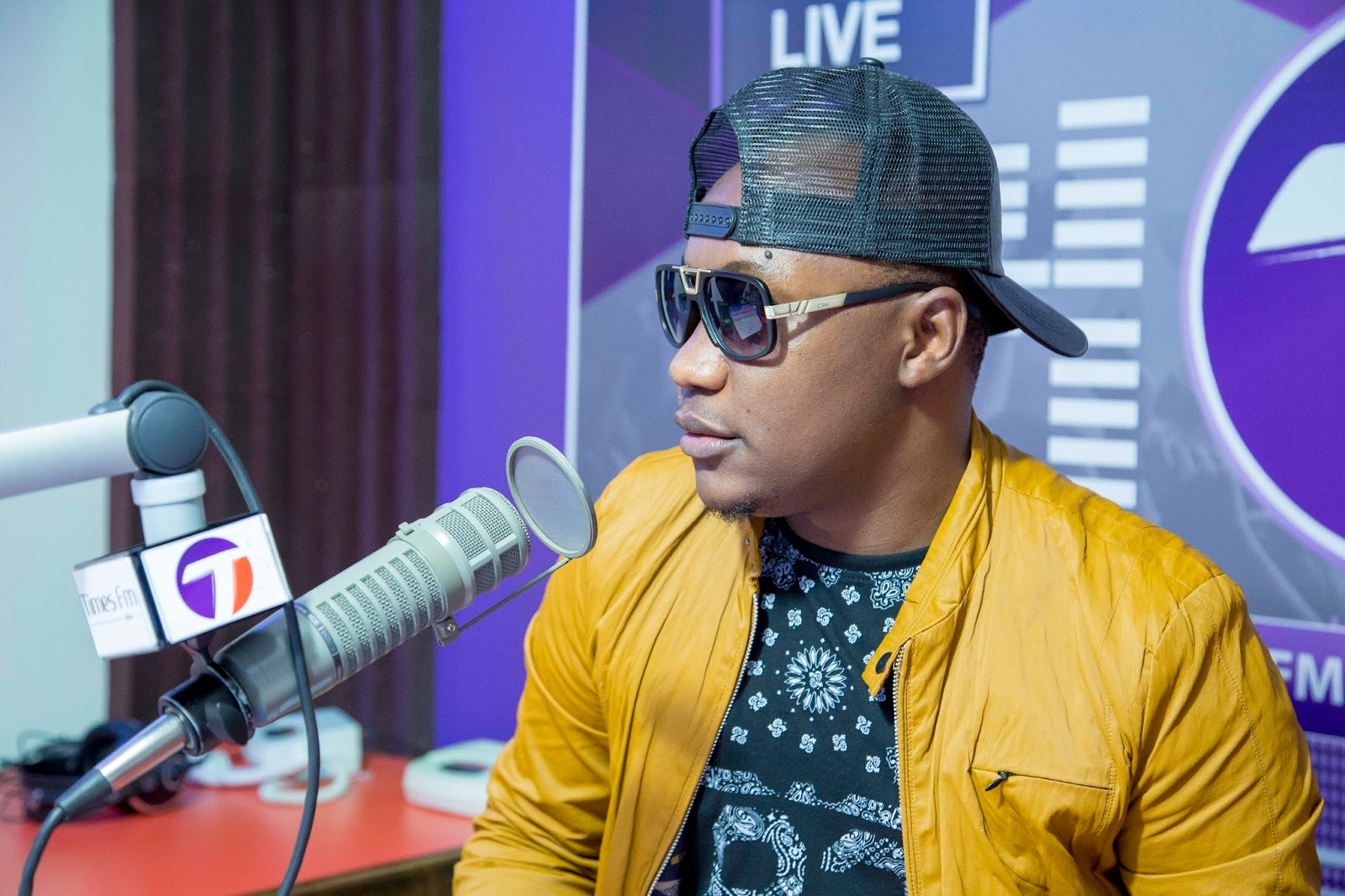
- Born: August 11, 1985 (age 40); Tabora, Tanzania
- Occupation(s): Radio and TV personality, Voice Over artist, Host(MC), Brand Influencer and Brand Ambassador
- Years active: 2006–present
- Awards: Best Host award at the African Entertainment Awards USA (AEAUSA) & Best Media Personality at the Starqt Awards
- Website: lilommy.com

Omary Rajabu Tambwe (born August 11, 1985) is a Tanzanian media personality, Content Creator, Brand Influencer and entrepreneur. Known as Lil Ommy, he is known for hosting “The Switch” a radio show about music, news, and culture programming. He also host “Big Sunday Live”, a TV show on Wasafi TV.

== Early career ==
Born and raised in Tabora, Lil Ommy’s first step in the media saw him navigate the radio business in Tabora by working at Voice of Tabora (VoT) radio.

It was then that he got an opportunity to interview music producers, who were the judges for Bongo Star Search show: P. Funk and Master J. These two interviews went viral until he moved to Times FM starting his show, The Playlist.

== Radio ==
The Playlist, a Bongo flavour and Urban culture entertainment show that promotes the local and African music on Times FM, became popular and some of the notable artists who appeared in the show were Wizkid, Davido, Diamond Platnumz, Alikiba, Mwana FA, Vanessa Mdee, 2Baba, Oskido, Sauti Sol, among others. Later in March 2020 he moved to Wasafi FM where he currently host The Switch, a radio show similar to The Playlist and Big Sunday Live - a TV Show at Wasafi TV.

== Awards ==
Year	Category	Awards	Result
2019	Best Media Personality	StarQT	Won
2019	Radio Personality Of The Year	Afrimma	Nominated
2019	Best Entertainment Host	2019 African Entertainment Awards USA	Won
