= Smile Communications Tanzania =

Smile Tanzania
- Company type: Private
- Industry: Telecommunications
- Founded: 28 July 2009
- Headquarters: Regent Business Park, Mikocheni, Dar es salaam, Tanzania
- Key people: Fiona McGloin (Country Manager)
- Services: Telecommunications; Carrier
- Parent: Smile Telecoms Holdings Limited
- Website: Company website

Smile Communication Tanzania Ltd (Smile TZ) is a telecommunications network company in Tanzania. It was registered in July 2009 and began commercial operations in May 2013. The company is a subsidiary of Smile Telecoms Holdings, a South African telecommunications conglomerate, whose subsidiaries include: (a) Smile Telecom (Nigeria) (b) Smile Telecom (Tanzania) (c) Smile Telecom (South Africa) and (d) Smile Telecom (Uganda). Smile's first country of operation in Africa was in Tanzania. Smile Tanzania was the first company to launch commercial 4G LTE services in Tanzania and began its operations in the city of Dar es Salaam.

== Products and services ==
Currently Smile Tanzania is solely a data provider making plans to enter into the Voice and Wireless service in leu of its spotting as a reserved bidder in the purchase of 9mobile. However, in November 2015 Smile launched the first Voice of LTE service in East Africa in Partnership with Alcatel-Lucent.

According to statistic report by Tanzania Communications Regulatory Authority in June 2023 Smile Tanzania had 13,840 subscribers.

== Area of operation ==
Smile Tanzania Area of Operation.

Smile Tanzania began its operations in Dar es Salaam and Arusha. However, the company expanded its network after the company had raised US$365 million in debt and equity financing to extend broadband services. They operate in the following cities:

- Arusha
- Dar es Salaam
- Dodoma
- Mbeya
- Morogoro
- Moshi
- Mwanza

== See also ==
- Telecommunications in Tanzania
- SmileTelecom (Uganda)
