= Cambridge Broadband =

UK-based telecommunications equipment company

Cambridge Broadband Networks Group Limited
- Company type: Private
- Industry: Telecommunications
- Founded: 2000
- Headquarters: Cambridge, UK
- Products: Wireless backhaul and access networks

Cambridge Broadband Networks Limited (CBNL) is a British telecommunications company which develops and manufactures point-to-multipoint (PMP) wireless backhaul and access solutions.

The company is owned by these investors: Amadeus Capital Partners, Accel Partners, TVM Capital GmbH, Adara Venture Partners and Samsung Ventures Europe.

== Leadership ==
- Jonathan McKay (Chairman)
- Lionel Chmilewsky (Chief Executive Officer)

== Locations ==
The company's headquarters are in Cambridge in the United Kingdom, as part of the Cambridge technology cluster (Silicon Fen). CBNL also has offices in South Africa, Nigeria and Kenya.

== Products and services ==
The company's VectaStar product uses its PMP topology to share wireless backhaul and access resource between several cell sites, each generating voice and packet traffic. This technology means spectrum can be managed dynamically and efficiently. VectaStar is used by telecommunications network providers to build wireless backhaul and access networks, such as new packet networks; mobile broadband network upgrades; Ethernet enterprise networks and 2G – 3G IP backhaul migration. VectaStar delivers up to and over 300 Mbit/s full duplex per sector and is deployable in 2G, 3G, 4G, 5G small cell and Long Term Evolution (LTE) backhaul networks.

The company also offers the following services: network planning and design; network deployment; network operation; customer training and WEEE recycling.

== History ==
The company was founded in 2000 by ten engineers from Cambridge University who obtained private equity funding relating to the increased demand for mobile communications. Soon after the company started, the earliest variant of VectaStar was released. Over the following years CBNL identified new market opportunities and developed product variants to address those, including new frequencies and a move into the backhaul space.

The period of 2005–2010 saw the Company grow 864 per cent, a ranking in the top 200 on the Deloitte Technology Fast 500 EMEA 2010, a ranking of the 500 fastest growing technology companies in EMEA, and a ranking of 38 in the Sunday Times Microsoft Tech Track 100 in 2011.

In November 2011 the Company supplied microwave radio equipment to backhaul Telefónica UK's O2 4G trial network in London, UK.

== Small cells ==
In April 2012 CBNL announced that it had been accepted as a member of the Small Cell Forum, a not-for-profit membership organization that seeks to enable and promote small cell technology worldwide. CBNL has since been appointed Vice Chair of Small Cell Forum Backhaul Special Interest group.

As a member of Next Generation Mobile Networks (NGMN) Alliance, CBNL worked with operators and vendors to try to determine consensus around the specific needs for Small Cell backhaul technology. Results from this work were published in July 2012 in the NGMN Alliance's white paper ‘Small Cell Backhaul Requirements’.
