= Halotel =

Tanzanian mobile communications company

Viettel Tanzania Public Limited Company (Halotel)
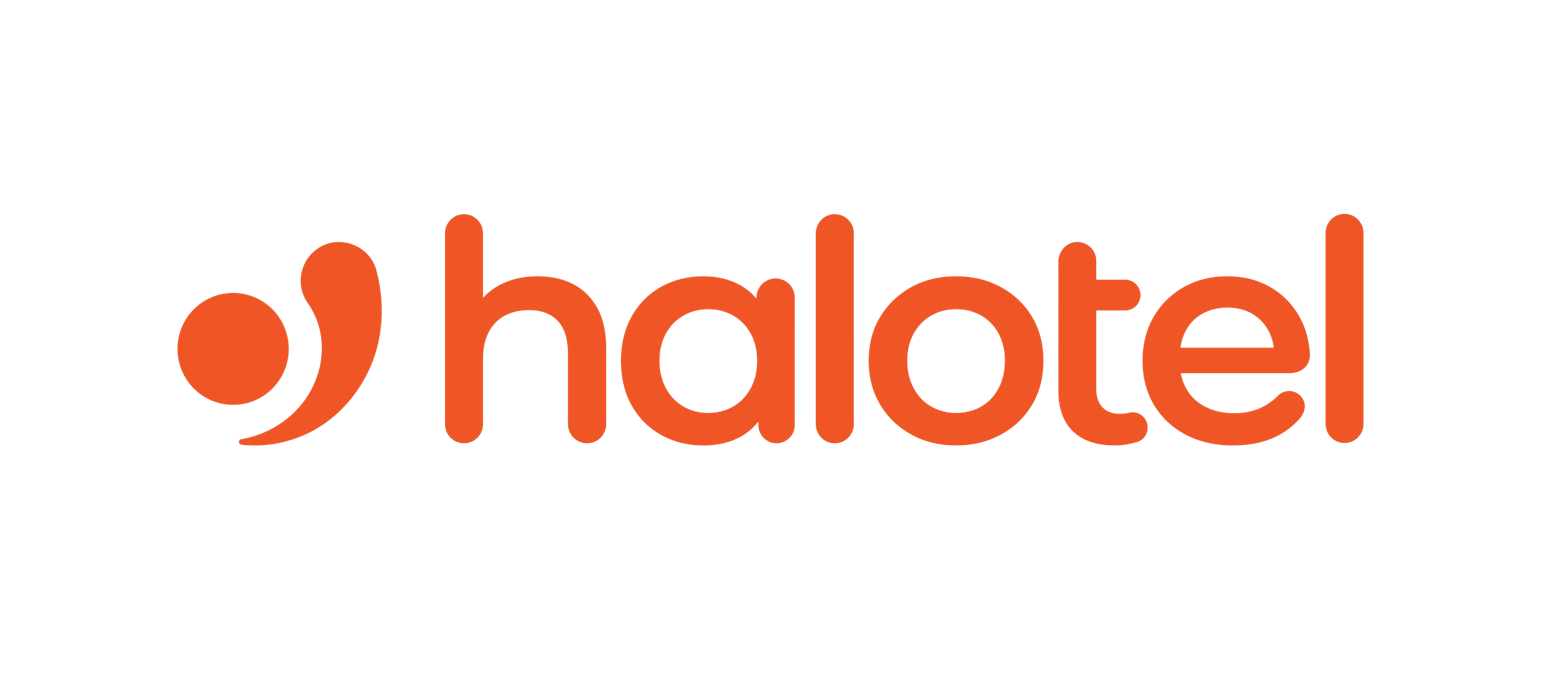
- Type: Public
- Industry: Telecommunications
- Founded: 15 October 2015; 10 years ago
- Headquarters: Tanzanite Park, New Bagamoyo Road, Dar es Salaam, Tanzania
- Area served: Tanzania
- Key people: Bui Van Thang (Managing Director)
- Products: GSM-related products Internet services
- Number of employees: 702 (F.Y. 2023) (Tanzanian Employees)
- Parent: Viettel Group
- Website: www.halotel.co.tz

Viettel Tanzania Public Limited Company, trading as Halotel, is a mobile communications company, providing voice, messaging, data and communication services in Tanzania. It is owned by Viettel Global JSC which is the state-owned Investment Company from Vietnam investing in the Telecommunications market in several countries worldwide. It has invested up to $1 Billion into the Tanzania's telecommunications market. The Company was the first company in Tanzania allowed to lay its own fiber optic cable and has placed over 18,000 km of optic fiber, providing all 26 regions of Tanzania with telecommunication services.

The Tanzanian telecom market is one of the most competitive markets in Africa and Tanzania has over 79% mobile phone penetration. The company aims to capitalize on the providing a very wide coverage as quickly as possible and the company claims to cover over 81% of the country's area soon to be the higher than any of the major providers.

== History ==
Halotel was launched in October 2015 and deployed in all 26 Tanzanian regions. This was Viettel's fourth investment in Africa after Movitel, Lumitel and Nexttel in Mozambique, Burundi and Cameroon respectively. Viettel started investing in the country in 2011 and planned $736 million in investment after the then president Jakaya Kikwete made a state visit to Vietnam. The goal of the government was to encourage rural mobile connectivity in the country where and the government saw fit to increase competition by allowing Viettel to operate in the country.

The entry of Viettel also saw further liberalization of the communication sector, where the government allowed private companies to lay their own optic fiber cables. The company had promised to connect several public institutions around the country with the optic fibre network and connect over 1500 villages to the telecommunication grid that were previously not served. The company also tried to partner with state-owned energy company Tanzania Electric Supply Company Limited (TANESCO) to use TANESCO's power poles to serve as antennas, however due to high costs the plan was abandoned.

In 2015, the company obtained licenses to operate its mobile money services HALOPESA. At this time around 32% of the country was already using mobile banking from other providers

== Coverage ==
Halotel currently covers all regions of Tanzania with its 2G and 3G network via the 900 MHz, 1800 MHz and 2100 MHz Frequency Spectrums and is on an ongoing deployment of telecommunication towers and sites to cover all regions with its 4G network. To improve on its 4G coverage and capacity, Halotel obtained additional 2600 MHz Frequency Spectrum as auctioned off by the Tanzania Communications Regulatory Authority in October 2022.

== Subscription and Market Share ==
As of March 2023, Halotel boasts a total of 8,146,036 subscribers out of the 61.9 Million Mobile telecommunication services subscribers in Tanzania which is a 13% market share. Halotel through its HaloPesa mobile money service boasts a sum of 3,821,098 subscribers with access to the service in the country, a total of 9% market share in the Mobile financial services space.

== Viettel Group ==
Map showing countries with Viettel Group presence

Viettel Group is a Vietnam based telecommunications group. It is a state-owned enterprise wholly owned and operated by the Ministry of Defence of Vietnam. The company has a customer base of over 75 million as of 2014 and made over $8 billion in revenue. As of December 2015, the Group has subsidiaries in:

Viettel Group global subsidiaries (December 2015)
Africa		Americas		Asia	
Burundi	Lumitel	Haiti	Natcom	Cambodia	Metfone
Cameroon	Nexttel	Peru	Bitel	Laos	Unitel
Mozambique	Movitel			East Timor	Telemor
Tanzania	Halotel			Myanmar	Viettel Mytel
				Vietnam	Viettel Mobile

== See also ==
- Telecommunications in Tanzania
- Tanzania Communication Regulatory Authority
