= Detecon =

German Enterprise

Detecon International GmbH
- Type: GmbH
- Industry: Consulting
- Founded: August 1, 2002
- Headquarters: Cologne, Germany
- Key people: Managing Director Dr. Uwe Heckert (CEO); Managing Director Tobias Braun (CFO); Managing Director Säde Thomkins (CHRO); Chair of the Supervisory Board Nicole Appelt
- Revenue: €200M EUR (2025)
- Number of employees: 1,100 (2025)
- Parent: T-Systems
- Website: www.detecon.com/en

Detecon International GmbH is a German management and technology consulting company headquartered in Cologne. Established in 1977, it is part of the Deutsche Telekom Group and advises corporate and public sector organizations on digital transformation, IT and technology strategy, and telecommunications.Detecon also serves as a consulting partner for the Advisory Services division of Telekom subsidiary T-Systems International GmbH.

== History ==
Detecon was founded in 1977 in Bonn, Germany, under the name Deutsche Telepost Consulting as an affiliated entity of Deutsche Bundespost. Its initial activities focused on providing consulting services to the international telecommunications industry, including infrastructure studies, feasibility assessments and the planning, implementation and maintenance of telecommunications networks.

During the 1980s, Detecon expanded its international activities, undertaking telecommunications infrastructure projects in Europa, Asia, Africa and other regions. By 1990, the company was active internationally, including in Eastern Europa. Its consulting work included network planning, infrastructure development and support for the modernization of telecommunications systems.

One of Detecon's major projects was its involvement in the development of digital mobile communications in Germany and the introduction of the GSM standard. In 1987, the company establishe the Digital Mobile Communications project (Projekt Digitale Mobilkommunikation, PDM) to support the development and implementation of digital mobile networks for Deutsche Bundespost Telekom. The project involved the development and standardization of GSM technology, planning the German GSM network, establishing network operations and implementing billing systems. This work contributed to the launch of Deutsche Telekom's D1 GSM network in 1992. In 1993, approximately 700 Detecon employees working in digital mobile communications were transferred to the newly established DeTeMobil, later known as T-Mobile.

Detecon also participated in telecommunications sector restructuring and privatization projects in emerging markets. In 2000, a consortium involving Detecon acquired a 51 percent stake in Uganda Telecom. In 2001, a consortium comprising Detecon and MSI acquired a 35 percent stake in Tanzania Telecommunications Company.

The company's present corporate structure dates back from 1 August 2002, when Detecon merged with Diebold Deutschland GmbH to form Detecon International GmbH. Diebold itself had been founded in 1954 by John Diebold in New York City and established a presence in Germany in 1959. Its German business was acquired by debis Systemhaus GmbH, a subsidiary of Daimler-Benz AG, in 1991. Following Deutsche Telekom's acquisition of debis Systemhaus in 2002 and its integration into T-Systems, Diebold Deutschland was merged with Detecon.

Following the merger, Detecon continued to develop its international operations and broadened its consulting portfolio beyond telecommunications. Its activities expanded to include management consulting, information technology, digital transformation and technology strategy. The company also established and maintened offices in several regions around the world, including Europe, Asia, Switzerland, Sweden, China, Thailand and the United Arab Emirates. Detecon operates from 18 locations and has completed projects in 136 countries.

== Services and areas of expertise ==
Detecon organizes its management and technology consulting services into two main areas: Digital Strategy & Innovation and Transformation & Business Technology. Its work covers strategic, organizational and technological aspects of digital transformation.

Digital Strategy & Innovation

- Business & Digital Strategy: Development of digital business strategies, business models and approaches to strategic repositioning.
- Digital Innovation & Experience: Consulting on innovation management, digital products and services, and the design of customer experiences.
- Data & Applied AI: Development of data and AI strategies, as well as support for the implementation and application of data-driven and AI-enabled solutions.
- Hyper-connectivity, IoT & Smart-X: Consulting on connected technologies and applications, including industrial IoT, 5G/6G, smart cities and digital twins.
- (Telco) Regulatory Advisory: Advice on regulatory matters in the telecommunications and digital sectors, including spectrum policy and access regulation.

Transformation & Business Technology

- Technology Strategy, Architecture & IT Transformation: Development of IT strategies and target architectures, as well as support for the modernization and transformation of IT environments.
- Organizational Transformation: People, Change & Agile: Support for organizational change, change management and the adoption of agile ways of working.
- Cyber Security, Governance, Risk & Compliance: Consulting on information security, data protection, risk management and regulatory compliance.
- Infrastructure & Cloud Transformation Advisory: Advice on the modernization of IT and telecommunications infrastructure and the adoption and transformation of cloud environments.
- Process Digitalization & App Modernization: Digitalization and optimization of business processes, alongside the modernization of enterprise applications.

The company supports clients in the design and implementation of digital infrastructure and technology-driven business solutions across a range of industries, including telecommunications, automotive and manufacturing, public sector, transport and logistics, health and energy.

== Corporate structure ==
Detecon International GmbH is part of the Deutsche Telekom Group and operates as a consulting subsidiary of T-Systems International GmbH. Within T-Systems, Detecon provides management and technology consulting and serves as an integrated consulting partner for the company's Advisory business. Its activities complement T-Systems' broader portfolio of information and communications technology services, which includes cloud services, digital solutions, cybersecurity and connectivity.

While operating within the Deutsche Telekom Group, Detecon maintains its own corporate identity and focuses on management and technology consulting. It advises companies and public sector organizations on strategy, business transformation, digital innovation and technology-related challenges. Through its integration into T-Systems' Advisory portfolio, Detecon combines its consulting expertise with the wider technological capabilities and resources of the Deutsche Telekom Group.

== Locations ==
Detecon operates 18 offices worldwide across Europe, the Middle East, Asia, and Africa, including in Germany, Austria, Sweden, Switzerland, China, Thailand, the United Arab Emirates, and the United States. The company has been involved in consulting projects in more than 130 countries.

== Research and publications ==
In 2023, Detecon and market research company 2HMforum studied the digitalization of public administration in Germany, surveying 100 public-sector decision-makers and 33 IT service providers. The findings were covered by eGovernment.

In 2025, a Detecon study on technology adoption in the automotive industry found that 70% of surveyed companies struggled to assess the potential of new technologies, while 57% had refrained from adopting a technology as a result. The findings were reported by Beschaffung aktuell.

Together with IW Consult, Detecon also examined the economic impact of data centers in the Frankfurt Rhine-Main region. The 2025 study was covered by heise online.

In collaboration with the International Centre for Industrial Transformation (INCIT), Detecon developed the Industrial Artificial Intelligence Maturity Readiness Index (AIMRI), launched in December 2025 to assess AI readiness in manufacturing companies.

== Awards ==
Detecon has been included in a number of industry studies and rankings conducted by independent organizations, including Handelsblatt, Lünendonk & Hossenfelder, the Austrian Industriemagazin, and Markt und Mittelstand.

- 2026: brand eins – The Best Management Consultants of 2026 (Technology & Telecommunications)
- 2025: Lünendonk List – ranked among the leading management consulting firms in Germany
- 2025: Industriemagazin – Management Consulting Ranking (1st place in Transport and Logistics; 2nd place in IT Strategy and Implementation; 3rd place in Digitalisation)
- 2024–2025: Industriemagazin – rankings in IT Strategy and Digitalisation
- 2024: Markt und Mittelstand – "Germany's Best Consultants" (IT Consulting)
- 2024: Handelsblatt – "Best Consultants" (Technology, Media and Telecommunications)
