= MIC Tanzania Limited =

Telecommunication company in Tanzania

YAS Tanzania Limited (Yas)
- Company type: Public
- Industry: Telecommunication Services
- Founded: 30 November 1993; 32 years ago
- Headquarters: PSSSF COMMERCIAL COMPLEX, Sam Nujoma Road, Dar es Salaam, Tanzania
- Area served: Tanzania
- Key people: Jerome Albou - MD; Isack Nchunda - CCO
- Products: Voice, Data, Messaging, Mobile Money
- Brands: Yas; Mixx by Yas
- Number of employees: 300,000
- Parent: Axian Group

Yas (Formally Tigo) is a telecommunication company in Tanzania.

With over 13.5 million registered subscribers to its network, Yas directly and indirectly employs over 300,000 Tanzanians, including an extended network of customer service representatives, mobile money merchants, sales agents, and distributors.

Yas is the biggest commercial brand of Axian Telecom, a pan-Afriacan company trading in 5 countries with commercial operations in Madagascar, Comoros, Senegal, Togo and Tanzania.

== History ==
In 1993, there was liberalization of telecommunication sector in the country which resulted in the dissolution of Tanzania Posts and Telecommunications Corporation (TPTC) in early 1994. MIC Tanzania Limited was granted a licence on November 30, 1993. The corporation was a joint venture between Millicom International Cellular based in Luxembourg, Ultimate Communications Limited of Tanzania and Tanzania Posts and Telecommunications Corporation Bibi. In this venture, 27.7% of the issued share capital was allotted to the Ultimate Communications Limited and Tanzania Posts and Telecommunications Corporation.

=== Mobitel ===
The company began operations in 1994 under the name Mobitel and launched Tanzania's first cellular (analogue) service. In 1998 the company expanded significantly and began pre-paid service under the brand "Simu Poa" and began issuing pre-paid cards under the brand "Kadi Poa".

In 1999, Adesemi Tanzania, another telecommunication company operating in the country, was acquired by Mobitel. This gave Mobitel customers access to the company's Private Automatic Branch Exchange networks. At the time, Mobitel was the first company in Africa to provide subscription-free Internet services under its "MobiNet" brand.

In September 2000, with a partnership with Ericsson Mobitel launched its digital GSM network in Dar es Salaam. Both networks were run simultaneously, with the GSM network in the cities and the analogue network in rural areas. The GSM network was marketed under the brand "Buzz", while the analogue network remained under the "Kadi Poa" brand. The analogue network was continually phased out and was eventually shutdown in September 2005.

In February 2004, MIC's parent company Millicom International Cellular took over the 26% stake from the government to control 84% of the company's equity.

=== tiGO ===
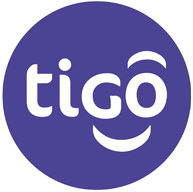
Tigo Logo

In February 2006, after buying out its minority shareholders, the Luxembourg-based pan-African mobile operator Millicom International Cellular announced to take a full control of three of its African-based Mobile operators including MIC Tanzania Limited. In Tanzania a USD 1.332 million deal enables Millicom to acquire the remaining 16% stake it did not already own after the cellco's minority shareholders agreed to cancel their call option on the business. Since then Millicom is the full controller of the company.

After this take over the company re-branded the company from "Buzz" to "tiGO", in line with the company's operations globally.

=== Re-branding to Yas ===
In April 2024 MIC was acquired by Axian Telecom Group and Tanzanian businessman Rostam Aziz. Following the parent's policy to aligning with a broader strategy to create a unified pan-African brand across its markets, in 26 November 2024 they changed the name from tiGO to Yas.

The re-branding also includes the company's mobile financial services, with Tigo Pesa now operating under the name Mixx by Yas.

=== Initial public offering ===
In December 2016, in accordance to the government law, tiGO Tanzania applied to list the company on the Dar es Salaam Stock Exchange, but as of April 9, 2019 it was yet to go public.

== Mobile Services ==
=== Mobile money ===
Yas like all telecommunication brands in Tanzania operates Mobile money services. Currently, Yas operates the second largest network and subscriber base for mobile money services in Tanzania. In 2014, the company became the first company in the world to share its profit with its subscribers through mobile money. The company issues quarterly dividends to customers based on their daily balance in their Mobile wallet.

Tigo Pesa (currently Mixx by Yas) became the first in Africa to provide a fully interoperable mobile money service network in 2014; that allowed its customers to trade money between Vodacom, Airtel and Zantel. The service also extended to Tigo in Rwanda and the company was the pioneer in East Africa's first cross-border money transfer mobile wallet product. The gateway allowed customers in Rwanda and Tanzania to send money to tiGO customers in the respective countries.

=== 4G LTE ===
In December 2015, Yas Tanzania launched 4G LTE services in Dar es Salaam. The company was the first in the country to bring 4G and 3G speeds to its customers and possibly one of the first companies in Africa to provide LTE services.

== Statistics ==
The Table below shows the number of subscribers tiGO had in December of the year based on figures by Tanzania Communication Regulatory Authority.

	Registered Subscribers	Market Share	Mobile Money Subscribers	Market Share	Notes
2012	6,370,796	24%	N/A	N/A	
2013	6,297,288	23%	N/A	N/A	
2014	8,624,638	25%	N/A	N/A	
2015	11,115,991	28%	5,252,523	30%	
2016^{*}	11,606,567	29%	5,584,052	32%	
2017	11,062,852	27.7%	6,091,578	27%	
2020	12,660,697	25%	8,754,060	28	19

- ^* Reports numbers as of Dec 2017.

== See also ==
1. 3G Technology
