= Tanzania Communications Regulatory Authority =

Regulation body in Tanzania

Agency overview
- Formed: 1 November 2003
- Preceding agencies: Tanzania Communications Commission; Tanzania Broadcasting Commission
- Jurisdiction: Tanzania
- Headquarters: Mawasiliano Towers, 20 Sam Nujoma Road, Dar es Salaam
- Agency executive: Jabiri Kuwe Bakari, director general
- Website: www.tcra.go.tz

The Tanzania Communications Regulatory Authority (TCRA), established under TCRA Act No. 12 of 2003, is an independent body responsible for overseeing the postal, broadcasting, and electronic communications industries in the United Republic of Tanzania. It is headquartered in the Ubungo ward of Ubungo District in the Dar es Salaam Region. The TCRA, formed by the merger of the Tanzania Communications Commission and the Tanzania Broadcasting Commission, is accountable to the Ministry of Communications and Technology.

Tanzania's Information Communication and Technology (ICT) reforms have been shaped by regional, national, and technological factors. Tanzania is one of the few African countries to liberalize its communications sector, adopting the Converged Licensing Framework (CLF) as a regulatory strategy under the Tanzania Communications Regulations.

Since its establishment in 2003, the TCRA has introduced a number of regulations to govern the sector. It continues to face challenges, including the rollout of services to under-served rural areas.

== Mandate ==
The TCRA is tasked with regulating the postal, electronic-communications, and broadcasting industries across the United Republic of Tanzania. Its responsibilities include promoting effective competition and economic efficiency while safeguarding the interests of consumers. The TCRA also works to ensure the availability of regulated services and oversees the licensing and enforcement of license conditions for broadcasting, postal, and telecommunications operators.

The authority establishes standards for regulated goods and services, regulates rates and tariffs, and manages the radio-frequency spectrum. It is responsible for monitoring the performance of the regulated sectors and ensuring the successful implementation of ICT applications to drive technological advances and improve service delivery nationwide.

The TCRA was established under the Tanzania Communications Regulatory Authority Act of 2003. The primary legislation governing industries regulated by the TCRA is the Universal Communications Service Access Act of 2006.

Policies that influence the functioning of the Tanzania Communications Regulatory Authority (TCRA) include:

- National ICT Policy of 2003
- National Postal Policy of 2003

== Regulations ==
- Tanzania Communications (Quality of Service) Regulations of 2005
- Tanzania Communications (Broadband Services) Regulations of 2005
- Tanzania Communications (Consumer Protection) Regulations of 2005
- Tanzania Broadcasting (Content) Regulations of 2005
- Tanzania Communications (Licensing) Regulations of 2005
- Tanzania Communications (Importation and Distribution) Regulations of 2005
- Tanzania Communications (Installation and Maintenance) Regulations of 2005
- Tanzania Communications (Interconnection) Regulations of 2005
- Tanzania Communications (Telecommunication Numbering and Electronic Address) Regulations of 2005
- Tanzania Postal Regulations of 2005
- Tanzania Communications (Radio Communications and Frequency Spectrum) Regulations of 2005
- Tanzania Communications (Tariffs) Regulations of 2005
- Tanzania Communications (Type Approval of Electronic Communications Equipments) Regulations of 2005
- Tanzania Communications (Access and Facilities) Regulations of 2005

== Duties and functions ==
=== Duties ===
According to Act No. 12 of 2003, the duties of TCRA include the following:

1. Promoting effective competition and economic efficiency
2. Protecting the interest of consumers
3. Protecting the financial viability of efficient suppliers
4. Promoting the availability of regulated services to all consumers, including low-income, rural, and disadvantaged consumers
5. Enhancing public knowledge, awareness, and understanding of the regulated sectors, including:
  - The rights and obligations of consumers and regulated suppliers
  - The ways in which complaints and disputes may be initiated and resolved
  - The duties, functions and activities of the authority
6. Taking into account the need to protect and preserve the environment

=== Functions ===
The functions of TCRA, according to Act No. 12 of 2003 (CAP .172) and the revision thereof (the Tanzania Communications Regulatory Authority Act, CAP .172 R.E. 2017) include, among others, the following:

1. To perform the functions conferred on the Authority by sector legislation; to:
  - issue, renew and cancel licences
  - establish standards for regulated goods and regulated services
  - establish standards for the terms and conditions of supply of the regulated goods and services
  - regulate rates and charges
  - make rules for carrying out the purposes and provisions of this Act and the sector legislation
2. To monitor the performance of the regulated sectors concerning:
  - levels of investment
  - availability, quality and standards of services
  - the cost of services
  - the efficiency of production and distribution of services
  - other matters relevant to the authority
3. To facilitate the resolution of complaints and disputes
4. To take over and continue carrying out the functions of the former Tanzania Communications Commission and Tanzania Broadcasting Commission
5. To disseminate information about matters relevant to the functions of the Authority
6. To consult with other regulatory authorities or bodies, or institutions discharging functions similar to those of the Authority in the United Republic of Tanzania and elsewhere

The Electronic and Postal Communications Act No. 3 of 2010 – CAP. 306 and the revision thereof (the Electronic and Postal Communications Act, CAP. 306 R.E. 2017) further provides the main functions of TCRA to include:

1. Issuance of licenses and regulating electronic communications systems
2. Issuance of Postal Licenses and regulating the provision of Postal Services
3. Promoting fair competition and level playing field
4. Issuance of electronic communication numbering and addressing
5. Allocating, managing, and regulating addresses and postcodes
6. Managing and assigning the national radio frequency spectrum
7. Establishing standards for technical equipment connected to a network
8. Establishing a central equipment identification register
9. Establishing and maintaining subscribers’ database
10. Regulating content-related matters

== Board ==
The TCRA chair and vice-chair are appointed by the president of Tanzania in accordance with section 7 (2) of the Tanzania Communications Regulatory Authority (TCRA) Act No. 12. Following the provisions of clause 2.(2) of the First Schedule to the Tanzania Communications Regulatory Authority Act No. 12 of 2003, the minister of communications, science and technology, after submission by the nominations committee and a competitive selection procedure in accordance with Section 13 (6) of the TCRA Act, appoints the remaining members of the TCRA board. Under the provisions of Section 7 (1) of the Tanzania Communications Regulatory Authority Act No.12 of 2003, the seven members of the TCRA board are:

- Jones A. Killimbe – chair
- Khalfan S. Saleh – vice-chair
- Vupe Ursula Ligate
- Mzee Suleiman Mndewa
- Ndalahwa Habbi Gunze
- George Mulamula

== See also ==
- Mass media in Tanzania
