= Gia Binh International Airport =

Future airport to serve Hanoi, Vietnam

Gia Binh International Airport Sân bay quốc tế Gia Bình Cảng hàng không quốc tế Gia Bình
- IATA: GBN; ICAO: VVGB

Summary
- Airport type: Security/Public
- Owner/Operator: Masterise Aviation Infrastructure
- Serves: Hanoi metropolitan area
- Location: Gia Bình, Bắc Ninh, Vietnam
- Occupants: Police Aviation Regiment
- Coordinates: 21°04′26″N 106°12′39″E
- Website: https://giabinh-airport.com/

Map
- 2030 masterplan

Runways
| Direction | Length | | Surface |
| Direction | ft | m | Surface |
|---|---|---|---|
| 07R/25L | 11,500 | 3,500 | Concrete |
| 06L/24R | 13,123 | 4,000 | Concrete |

Gia Binh International Airport (Cảng hàng không Quốc tế Gia Bình; IATA: GBN, ICAO: VVGB) is an international airport currently under construction in Gia Bình ward, Bắc Ninh, Vietnam, approximately 40 km (25 mi) to the east from the center of Hanoi. It is designed to complement the existing Noi Bai International Airport which is in the north. The airport is originally planned by the Vietnam Ministry of Public Security and will serve as the operating base for the Police Aviation Regiment of the People's Public Security of Vietnam.

== History ==
Construction began on 10 December 2024.
