= Panhard CRAB =

French combat vehicle

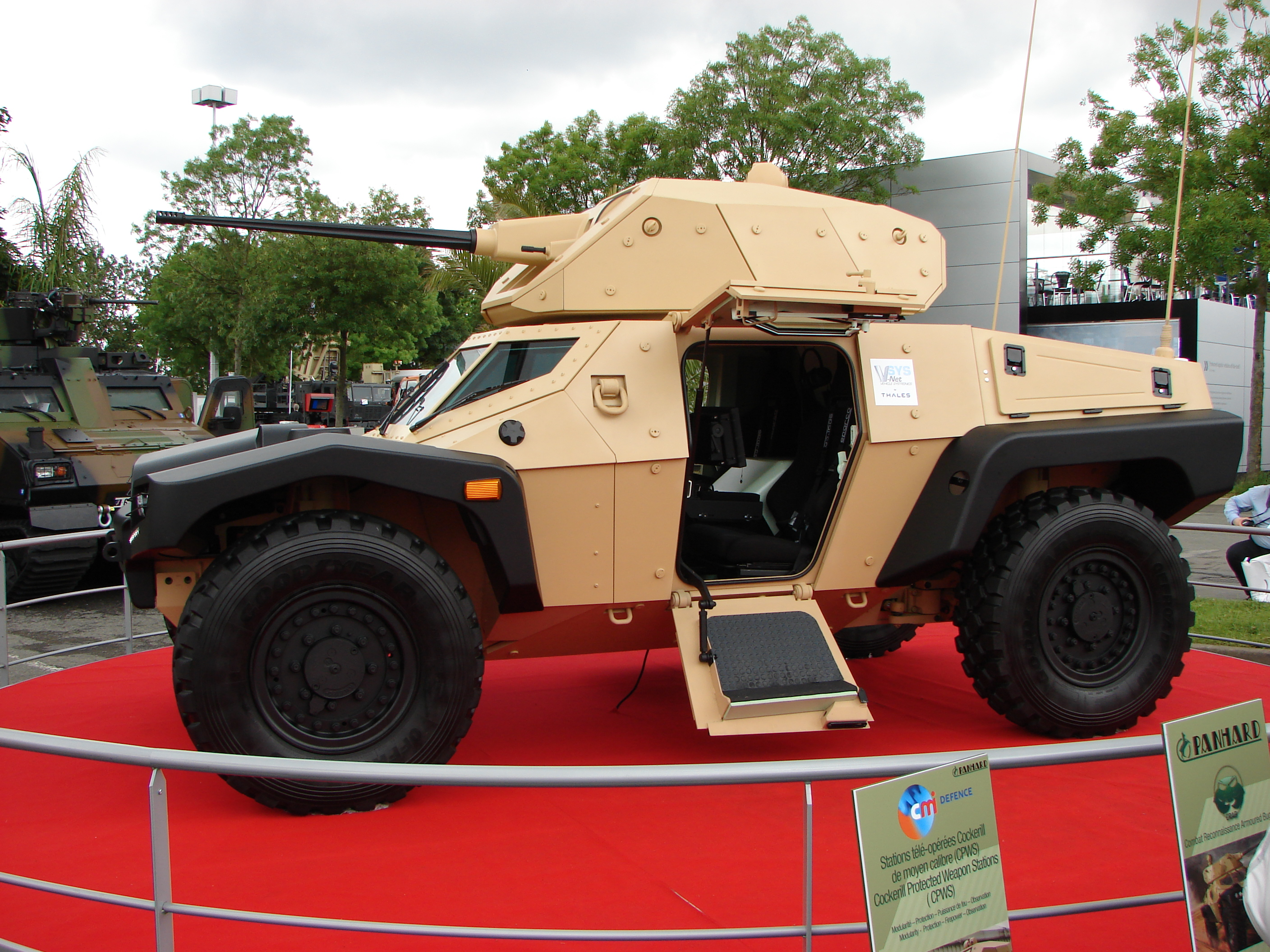
Panhard CRAB

Panhard CRAB (Combat Reconnaissance Armored Buggy) is a proposed new generation of 4x4 armoured combat vehicle designed and manufactured by Panhard, unveiled Eurosatory in 2012. It was designed as a vehicle candidate for the French Army.

== See also ==
- COMBATGUARD
- RAM MK3
- Wildcat APC
- Golan Armored Vehicle
