= Lương Tài (disambiguation) =

Lương Tài may refer to the following in Vietnam:

- Lương Tài
- Lương Tài district
