= Gia Bình =

- Ward
- Interactive map of Gia Bình
- Coordinates: 21.053494870242318°N 106.17182210425636°E
- Country: Vietnam
- Region: Red River Delta
- City: Bắc Ninh
- Established: 20 September 2026
- Seat: 10 Trần Hưng Đạo Street

Area
  - Total: 29.99 km^{2} (11.58 sq mi)

Population (2025)
  - Total: 43,782
  - Density: 1,460/km^{2} (3,800/sq mi)

Gia Bình is a ward (phường) of Bắc Ninh city, Vietnam. It is one of the 99 new wards, communes and special zones of the province following the reorganization in 2025.

== Geography ==
Gia Bình ward borders the following administrative divisions:

- To the east, Nhân Thắng ward.
- To the west, Mão Điền and Trạm Lộ wards.
- To the south, Lương Tài ward and Lâm Thao commune.
- To the north, Đông Cứu and Đại Lai communes.

Gia Bình ward covers an area of 29.99 km² and has a population of 43,782 people, giving it a population density of approximately 1,460 people per km².

== History ==
The district was originally called Gia Định (Hán: 嘉定) district, but since this caused it to be confused with Thành Gia Định, the name of Saigon at the time, Nguyễn dynasty officials changed the name to Gia Bình (嘉平) district in 1820.

Gia Binh is a fertile alluparts land on the Duong River, so thousands of ancient Vietnamese residents have come here to establish their careers and leave their mark on burial sites, landmarks, monuments and beliefs. Archaeologists have discovered in Lang Soak commune that there are residence sites and burial sites with copper relics such as axes, hammers, spears, marks belonging to Dong Son culture (about 4000 years ago today). It's also a phenomenon of belief, a series of villages located along the Duong River and Bai Giang River worshiping "Lac Thi Dai Vuong" (i.e. Lac Long Quan lineage) are ethnic water ancestors, noting that the Van Lang family of Dai Bai village worships "Lac Thi Dai Vuong" also retains the ortho daimity of Canh Hung 44 (1783) said quite clearly about the worshiped people as follows: "The ortho dai dai for the three great kings of the lineage of Lac Long Quan sacred in Dai Viet. It's the spirit that forms, made up of the mountains of rivers. Originally from hundreds of eggs, established a mechanism in the southern heavens. Opening the one-way prosperity, from the North back to eradicating the yoke, making the water circuit rest, once sheltering our people, illustrious reputation, is worthy of praise. Because the new king was crowned a treasure, watching over the main thing, considering the ceremony was elevated, the king orthed the american temple, again the family considered dai Viet Lac Thi linh to ord the virtue of the three kings".

The Hung Vuong - An Duong Vuong period, the land of Gia Binh under the Vu Ninh ministry and left a bold mark on the temple of Cao Lu Vuong (Cao Duc commune). According to the mythology, he was a talented general who helped An Duong Vuong build au Lac nation, built Co Loa city, had the work of making "crossbows" to fight water retention.

In 1282, the Tran Dynasty held the Binh Than conference in the canton of Van Ti now in Cao Duc commune, the land of present-day Gia Binh, Bac Ninh province, united against the Nguyen|nol army. Tran Quoc Tuan was promoted to Commander-in-Chief [army].

On August 5, 1472, Le Thai Tong died in Le Chi Park (now dai lai commune), aged 20. Nguyen Trai and his wife Nguyen Thi Lo were convicted of killing the king. Nguyen Trai's three families were displaced. (See Le Chi Park Case).

During the anti-Northern period, the land belonged to an An Binh and Nam Dinh districts. Ly Tran life in An Dinh district, Bac Giang highway. During the Le Dynasty, An Dinh district was renamed to Gia Dinh, belonging to Thuan An government, Beijing town. In the past, the capital of Gia Binh district was in Bao Examination commune. In 1820 it was transferred to Dong Binh commune. In 1888 moved to Nhan Huu commune. In 1841, he moved to Heixi Commune. In 1920, he moved to Nghia Thang Mountain in the Thien Thai Range, present-day Dong Salvation Commune.

In August 1950, Gia Binh and Luong Tai districts were merged into one district named Gia Luong district | Gia Luong,], in Bac Ninh province.

In 1962, Bac Ninh province and Bac Giang province 1st 100th | Hebei County, Ing liang County, Hebei Province.

In 1997, Bac Ninh province was reest established, Gia Luong district of Bac Ninh province.

According to Decree No. 68/1999/ND-CP Gia Binh district is separated from Gia Luong district with 13 communes.

According to Decree No. 37/2002/ND-CP, established Gia Binh town - the district capital town of Gia Binh district on the basis of 213.08 hectares of natural area and 3,198 demographics of Xuan Lai commune; 71.92 ha of natural area and 1,389 demographics of Dai Bai commune; 151.39 ha of natural area and 3,085 demographics of Dong Salvation commune.

After adjusting the administrative boundaries to establish Gia Binh township: Xuan Lai commune has 1,084.35 hectares of natural area and 8,251 demographics; Dai Bai commune has 627.46 hectares of natural area and 8,665 demographics; Dong Life commune has 666.28 hectares of natural area and 7,301 demographics; Gia Binh town has 436.39 hectares of natural area and 7,672 people.

On 16 June 2025, the National Assembly issued Resolution No. 203/2025/QH15 on amendments and supplements to several articles of the Constitution of the Socialist Republic of Vietnam. The resolution took effect on 16 June 2025. Under the resolution, district-level administrative units throughout Vietnam ceased to operate from 1 July 2025.

- The Standing Committee of the National Assembly issued Resolution No. 1658/NQ-UBTVQH15 on the reorganization of commune-level administrative units in Bắc Ninh Province in 2025. The resolution took effect on 16 June 2025. Accordingly, the entire natural area and population of Gia Bình Township and the communes of Xuân Lai, Quỳnh Phú, and Đại Bái in Gia Bình District were merged to form a new commune named Gia Bình.

The name Gia Bình commune was inherited from Gia Bình township and Gia Bình district, Bắc Ninh province.

On 4 August 2026, the Standing Committee of the National Assembly issued Resolution No. 388/NQ-UBTVQH16 on the establishment of wards in Bắc Ninh Province. The resolution took effect on 20 September 2026. Accordingly, Gia Bình Ward was established on the basis of the entire existing natural area and population of Gia Bình Commune.

On 24 August 2026, the National Assembly issued Resolution No. 39/2026/QH16 on the establishment of Bắc Ninh city on the basis of the entire natural area and population of Bắc Ninh province. The resolution took effect on 20 September 2026. Since then, Gia Bình ward has been part of Bắc Ninh city.
