= CombatGuard infantry mobility vehicle =

Israeli 4x4 armoured combat vehicle

CombatGuard
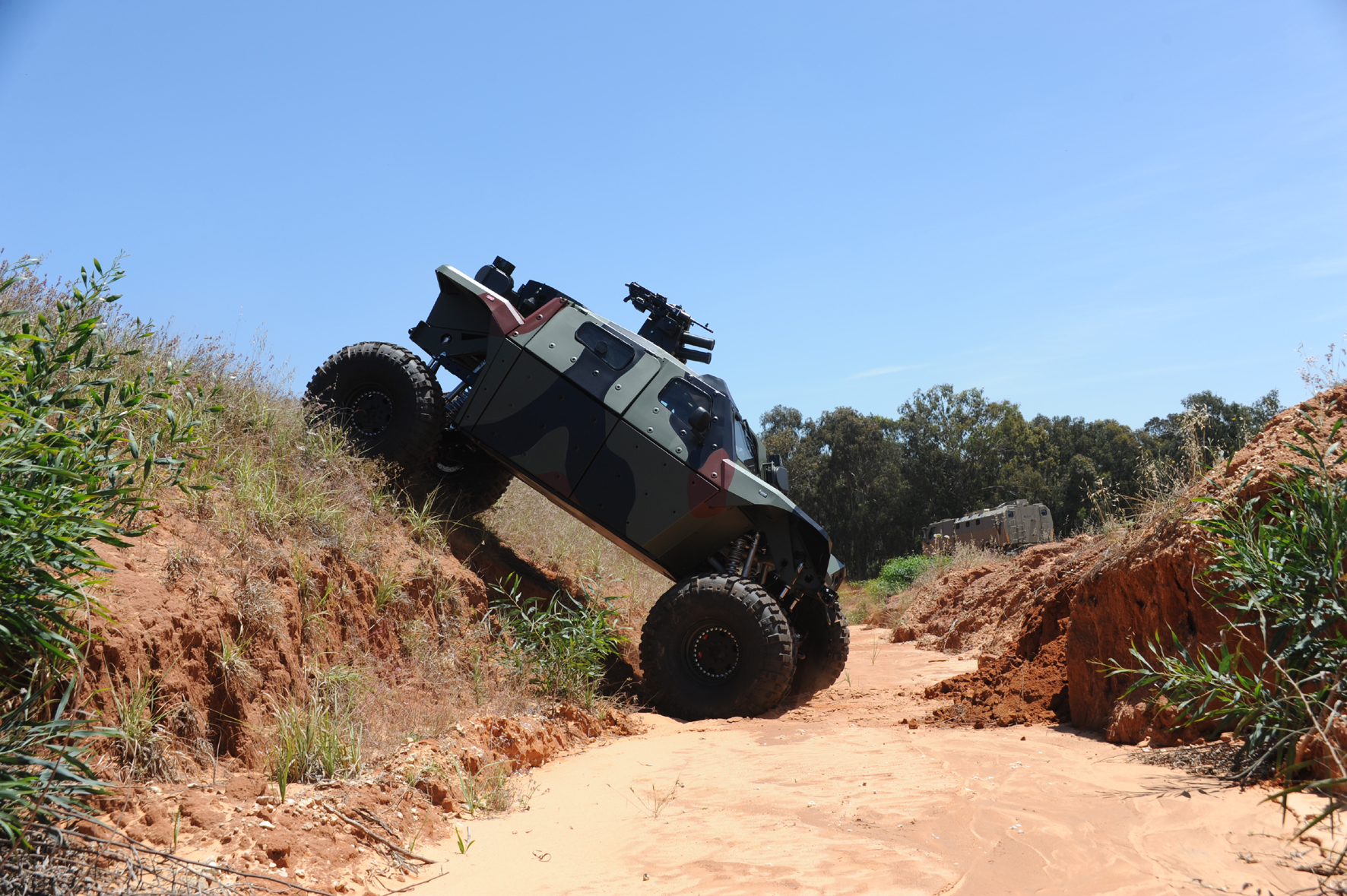
- Type: Infantry Mobility Vehicle
- Place of origin: Israel

Production history
- Designer: Israel Military Industries
- Manufacturer: Israel Military Industries
- Produced: 2014

Specifications
- Mass: Curb: 8500 kg
- Crew: 6–8
- Armor: Classified
- Main armament: Optional remote weapon station
- Secondary armament: Optional firing ports
- Engine: General Motors 6.5-litre diesel 300 HP
- Payload capacity: (1.5 t)
- Transmission: 4 speed automatic
- Suspension: 4×4 wheeled
- Ground clearance: (700 mm)
- Operational range: 500-800 km
- Maximum speed: 120 km/h offroad

CombatGuard is a new generation of 4x4 armoured combat vehicle designed and manufactured by IMI (Israel Military Industries), unveiled in 2014.

It features a monocoque central crew capsule of all-welded steel with an appliqué armour package, claimed to provide a high level of protection against small arms fire, mines, improvised explosive devices (IEDs) and explosive formed projectiles. It has an Iron Fist Bright Arrow active protection system against projectiles and missiles.

It can ford water obstacles 1.5 metres (5 ft) deep, travel a 35% side slopes and climb over a 70% gradient, vertical obstacles up to 80 cm (31 in) in forward drive and in reverse. Capable of 90 degree approach and departure angles.

== Operators ==
- Cameroon: On duty with the BIR and the Presidential Guard
- Turkmenistan: In use by the President of Turkmenistan.

== See also ==
- RAM MK3
- Wildcat APC
- Golan Armored Vehicle
- Panhard CRAB
