= Lương Tài district =

Coordinates: 21°01′04″N 106°12′10″E

Luong Tai District Huyện Lương Tài
- District
- Interactive map of Luong Tai District
- Country: Vietnam
- Region: Red River Delta
- Province: Bắc Ninh
- Capital: Thứa

Area
  - Total: 39 sq mi (101 km^{2})

Population (2019 census)
  - Total: 104,469
  - Density: 2,680/sq mi (1,030/km^{2})
- Time zone: UTC+7 (Indochina Time)

Lương Tài is a former rural district of Bắc Ninh province in the Red River Delta region of Vietnam. As of 2019 the district had a population of 104,469. The district covers an area of 101 km^{2}. The district capital lies at Thứa.

== Notable people ==
Lương Tài is the hometown of Vũ Miên and Vũ Trinh.
