= Vũ Trinh =

Vũ Trinh 武楨
- Born: 1759; Lương Tài, Đại Việt
- Died: 1828 (aged 68–69); Lương Tài, Đại Việt
- Occupation: Royal official
- Parent: Vũ Chiêu
- Writing career
- Language: Vietnamese, Hán văn
- Period: Revival Lê dynasty, Nguyễn dynasty
- Genre: Judiciary
- Notable works: Nguyễn triều hình luật, Sứ Yên thi tập, Cung oán thi tập

Vũ Trinh (chữ Hán: 武楨; 1759–1828) (pseudonyms 萊山 and 蘭池漁者) was a prominent scholar, official, and writer at the end of the Lê dynasty and the beginning of the Nguyễn dynasty.

== Biography & Family Background ==
Courtesy name and literary pseudonyms: Courtesy name Duy Chu; literary pseudonym Lan Trì Ngư Giả (“The Fisherman of Orchid Pond”). For a brief period, he became a Buddhist monk under the Dharma name Hải Âu Hòa Thượng and composed Trúc Lâm Tông Chỉ Nguyên Thanh, a work highly regarded in Buddhist studies. Vũ Trinh was the author of many classic Chèo plays in the history of Vietnamese performing arts.

Vũ Trinh was born in 1759 in Xuân Lan commune, Kinh Bắc region (present-day Ngọc Quan village, Lâm Thao commune, Bắc Ninh province). Scholarly lineage:

Grandfather: Vũ Miên, who passed the Hội nguyên (first laureate of the metropolitan exam), served as Chancellor, Rector of the Imperial Academy, and Chief Historian under the Lê–Trịnh court.

Father: Vũ Chiêu, top graduate of the Regional Exam (Hương), held the rank of Đặc tiến Kim tử Vinh lộc Đại phu and served as Deputy Commander of the Capital Garrison. Family ties: Vũ Trinh's wife was the elder sister of the great poet Nguyễn Du.

Trinh was known as a child prodigy with an above-average memory. In 1772, at the age of 13, Vũ Trinh got the title Đầu Xứ.

At 16, Vũ Trinh became Top Laureate (解元) (first laureate of the regional Hương tiến examination across multiple provinces. Then appointed Prefect of Quốc Oai.

Passed all three rounds of the Hội examination and gained fame that surpassed many Confucian Jinshi holders. He was a friend and relative of the prominent figures Nguyễn Du, Ngô Thì Nhậm, and Trần Danh Án.

== Government Service ==
- Under the Late Lê and Tây Sơn Dynasties: When Emperor Lê Chiêu Thống returned to Thăng Long, Vũ Trinh was appointed Vice chancellor (參知政事), concurrently serving as Vice Minister of Personnel and Justice, at the age of 28. Vũ Trinh was repeatedly invited by high-ranking Tây Sơn official Ngô Thì Nhậm to serve in the court, but he declined in order to preserve his loyalty and integrity toward the former Lê dynasty.
- Under the Nguyễn Dynasty

1802: Invited by Emperor Gia Long to serve as Court Academic (Thị trung học sĩ) in Phú Xuân (Huế).

1807: Appointed Deputy Chief Examiner for the Sơn Tây examination; later became Chief Envoy to Beijing on a diplomatic mission to the Qing Empire.

1809: Again served as Chief Envoy to Beijing to celebrate the 50th birthday of Emperor Jiaqing. He composed the now-lost poetry collection Sứ Yên Thi Tập during this mission.

== Legal and historical contributions ==
Co-authored the Hoàng Việt Luật Lệ (Gia Long Codes)

Drafted the Phàm Lệ Soạn Sử, laying the foundation for the Nguyễn Dynasty’s official historiography.

1813: Promoted to Vice Minister of Justice (Hình bộ hữu Tham tri) and served as an examiner in Quảng Đức.

1816: Falsely implicated in a scandal and was dismissed, exiled to Hội An. There, he taught many students — over ten of whom passed the imperial exams — and the locals built a temple in his honor while he was still alive.

1828: Pardoned by Emperor Minh Mạng and allowed to return home, where he died shortly after.

== Major Works & Literary Contributions ==
Lan Trì Kiến Văn Lục: A collection of 45 chuanqi (fantastic tales), rich in moral teachings and subtly expressing loyalty to the Lê dynasty.

Sứ Yên Thi Tập: A poetic work composed during his mission to Beijing (now lost).

Cung Oán Thi Tập: A poetry collection lamenting the sorrows of young palace women.

Gia Long Codes: Co-author of Vietnam’s earliest comprehensive legal code under the Nguyễn Dynasty.

== Legacy & Recognition ==
The Đại Nam Liệt Truyện praised him as having "profound scholarship and exemplary classical prose." Regarded as a loyal Confucian scholar who served the nation passionately, leaving "a noble legacy" under both the Lê and early Nguyễn dynasties. His chuanqi-style fiction is considered emblematic of East Asian prose literature, often compared with Pu Songling’s Strange Stories from a Chinese Studio (Liáozhāi Zhìyì).

== Evaluation ==
"From the perspective of Confucian philosophy of action, which was the orthodox concept of that era, the famous celebrity Vũ Trinh excellently fulfilled the role of a Confucian scholar: ideologically he was loyal to the country, first and foremost. His works were very diverse and unique, and in both the late Lê and Nguyễn dynasties, he were high-ranking official with meritorious services and good marks left in the country's history.", evaluated by Valedictorian Vũ Tú.
