= Gia Bình district =

Coordinates: 21°03′14″N 106°10′41″E

Gia Binh District Huyện Gia Bình
- District
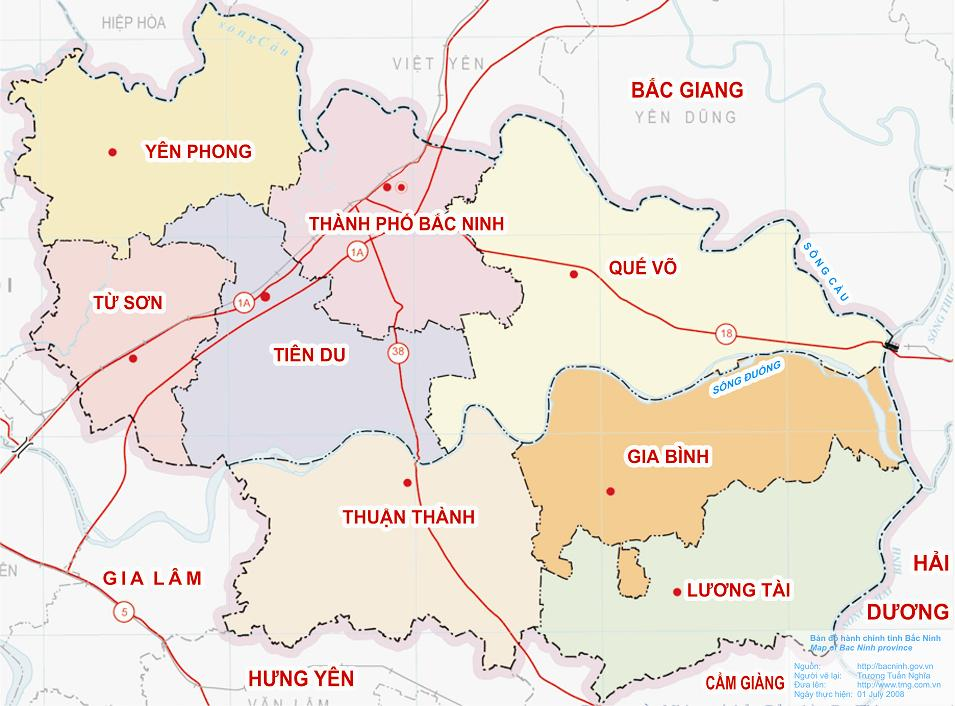
- Country: Vietnam
- Region: Red River Delta
- Province: Bắc Ninh
- Capital: Gia Bình

Area
  - Total: 42 sq mi (108 km^{2})

Population (2019)
  - Total: 103,517
  - Density: 2,480/sq mi (958/km^{2})
- Time zone: UTC+7 (Indochina Time)
- Website: giabinh.bacninh.gov.vn

Gia Bình is a former rural district of Bắc Ninh province in the Red River Delta region of Vietnam.

== History ==
The district was originally called Gia Định (Hán: 嘉定) district, but since this caused it to be confused with Thành Gia Định, the name of Saigon at the time, Nguyễn dynasty officials changed the name to Gia Bình (嘉平) district in 1820.

On August 5, 1472, the second king of the Post-Lê dynasty, Lê Thái Tông died at the age of 20, at Lệ Chi Viên (which nowadays belongs to Đại Lai commune, a part of Gia Bình district). Nguyễn Trãi and his wife, Nguyễn Thị Lộ, were accused of murdering the King, which resulted in the death of Nguyễn Trãi's relatives (including his father's, his mother's and his wife's relatives) Lệ Chi Viên

In 1950, Gia Bình was united with Lương Tài to form Gia Lương district, which was separated again on August 9, 1999.

== Today ==
As of 2003 the district had a population of 102,753. The district covers an area of 108 km^{2}. The district capital lies at Gia Bình. The district has an area of 107.9 km^{2}. Gia Bình is administratively divided into 14 subdivisions: one township (thị trấn), Gia Bình, and 13 communes (xã): Bình Dương, Cao Đức, Đại Bái, Đại Lai, Đông Cứu, Giang Sơn, Lãng Ngâm, Nhân Thắng, Quỳnh Phú, Song Giang, Thái Bảo, Vạn Ninh and Xuân Lai.

== Economy ==
Gia Bình is well known for some products such as Đại Bái Bronze and Xuân Lai Bamboo.

== Climate ==
Gia Bình district features a warm humid subtropical climate with plentiful precipitation. The annual average temperature is 24 °C. The highest is 30 °C in July; the lowest is 15 °C in January. The average annual sunshine is 1,530-1,776 hours, while the relative humidity is 79%. The district experiences the typical climate of northern Vietnam, where summers are hot and humid, and winters are, by national standards, relatively cold and dry. Summers, lasting from May to September, are hot and humid, receiving the majority of the annual 1,680 millimetres (66.1 in) of rainfall. The winters, lasting from November to March, are relatively mild, while spring in April can bring light rains. Autumn in October is the best time of the year in terms of weather.
