= Mobile Police Command =

- Bộ Tư lệnh Cảnh sát cơ động
- Seal
- Active: December 11, 2009
- Country: Vietnam
- Allegiance: Vietnam People's Public Security
- Type: Gendarmerie
- Role: Police tactical unit
- Size: 20,000
- Part of: Ministry of Public Security (Vietnam)
- Garrison/HQ: 23 Nguyễn Khang, Trung Hoà ward, Cầu Giấy district, Hanoi, Vietnam
- Nickname: Mobile Police (CSCĐ) / K02
- Anniversaries: April 15

Commanders
- Commanding General: Major General Lê Ngọc Châu
- Deputy Commanding General: Major General Nguyễn Thanh Bảnh; Major General Phạm Văn Bảng; Major General Nguyễn Ngọc Thanh; Major General Lê Văn Sao; Major General Lê Văn Hà; Colonel Trần Đình Đức; Colonel Phùng Văn Chiến; ColonelPhạm Hữu Thinh

Insignia
- Flag of the Vietnam People's Public Security

- Patch of People's Public Security Honor Guard

The Mobile Police Command (internally codenamed K02; Vietnamese: Bộ Tư lệnh Cảnh sát cơ động), also recognized as the Mobile Police (Cảnh sát Cơ động - CSCĐ) or the Mobile Police Force (Lực lượng Cảnh sát cơ động), is the tactical unit (SWAT-type) and virtually the paramilitary (gendarmerie) arm under the Vietnam People's Public Security Force that implements armed measures to protect national security, preserve social order and safety, and perform other tasks according to regulations provisions of law.

== History ==
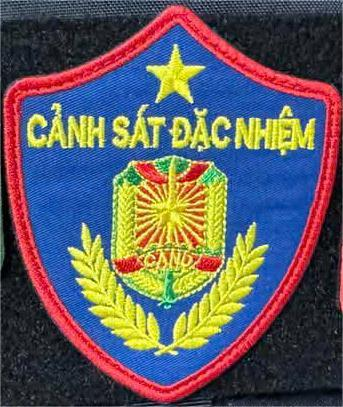
A 50th anniversary variant of the seal of the Special Police appeared for the first time on April 14, 2016, during a parade commemorating the 50th anniversary of the establishment of the Mobile Police Force by the Ministry of Public Security.

- The predecessor of the Mobile Police Force was the Armed Police Force established on April 15, 1974.
- On December 11, 2009, the Minister of Public Security signed the Decision No. 4058/QD-BCA establishing the Command of Mobile Police under the Ministry of Public Security.
- On December 9, 2013, the Secretariat of the Party Central Committee (XI term) issued Regulation No. 216-QD/TW on the implementation of the regime of political commissars and politicians at the Mobile Police Command, Ministry of Public Security.
- In June 2020, Mobile Police Command and the Ministry of Public Security launched a mobile mounted combat unit called the Mobile Mounted Police Regiment to tackle increasingly complex crimes and protect national security. It can also engage in rescues in mountainous areas as well as transport weapons and food to remote areas.

== Mission ==
1. Advise the Central Public Security Party Committee and the Ministry of Public Security on the work of armed forces to protect national security, maintain social order and safety, and build a mobile police force.

2. Implement combat plans against activities sabotaging security, armed riots, terrorism, kidnapping hostages; suppressing criminals using weapons; disbanding illegal disturbances and demonstrations.

3. Organize patrols, control and handle violations of the law on social security, order and safety; conduct a number of investigative activities in accordance with the law.

4. Organize the protection of important political, economic, diplomatic, scientific – technical, cultural, special shipments, conferences and important events according to the list prescribed by the Government.

5. Participating in the protection of court sessions, escorting the accused and defendants, and assisting in the protection of prisons and detention camps, and executing criminal judgments according to the regulations of the Minister of Public Security.

6. Organizing political, legal and professional training and retraining; formulating and rehearsing combat plans, patrolling and target protection plans according to the functions and tasks of the Mobile Police.

7. Organization of management, training and use of service animals.

8. Performing rituals in the People's Police.

9. Participating in search, rescue, prevention, combat and overcoming of natural disasters.

10. Participating in and coordinating with forces, units and localities where they are stationed to build a movement of all people to protect national security.

11. In an urgent situation to handle the situations specified in Clause 2 of this Article, or to chase down people and means that violate the law, or to give first aid to victims, they may mobilize people and vehicles of individuals and organizations.

12. Requisition of property in service of the Mobile Police's operations shall comply with the law on property requisition and requisition.

13. To have the right to request agencies, organizations and individuals to provide diagrams, designs and drawings of works and to enter personal residences, offices of agencies and organizations to rescue hostages and suppress acts of violence, terrorism and crime with weapons. The entry to the headquarters of diplomatic missions, foreign consular missions, representative offices of international organizations and the accommodation of members of these agencies in Vietnam must comply with the provisions of Vietnamese law and international treaties to which the Socialist Republic of Vietnam is a signatory. 14. Manage weapons, explosives, combat gears and technical means in service of the Mobile Police's operations according to the regulations of the Minister of Public Security.

15. International cooperation in accordance with the law.

16. Perform other tasks and exercise other powers as prescribed by law.

== Today's leaders ==
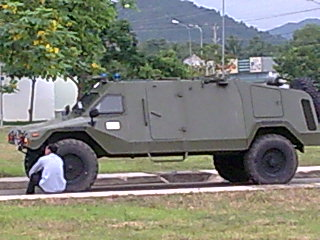
A RAM-2000 armored vehicle of the Mobile Police Force.

- Commander: Lieutenant-General Nguyễn Ngọc Vân
- Standing Deputy Commander: Brigadier Vũ Ngọc Riềm
- Deputy Commander: Brigadier Nguyễn Thanh Bảnh
- Deputy Commander: Brigadier Phạm Văn Bảng
- Deputy Commander: Brigadier Nguyễn Ngọc Thanh
- Deputy Commander: Brigadier Lê Văn Sao
- Deputy Commander: Colonel Trần Đình Đức
- Deputy Commander: Colonel Phùng Văn Chiến
- Deputy Commander: Colonel Phạm Hữu Thinh

Mobile Police includes:

- Special force
- Special Operations Forces
- Target Protection Force
- Training and use of service animals
- Special cargo transport force
- Air force, water force

== Component ==
- Department of Staff – Operations
- Political Bureau
- Department of Logistics – Engineering
- Department of Management, Training and Use of Service Animals
- Financial Committee
- Inspector of Command
- People's Police Ceremonial Delegation – Team Leader: Colonel Đỗ Ngọc Anh
- Professional Training and Retraining Center – Manager: Colonel Phan Công Côn
- National Training Center for Counter-Terrorism
- Northern Standing Office (Cluster A) (Hanoi)
- Central Standing Office (Cluster C) (Da Nang)
- Standing Agency for the South (Cluster B) (HCMC)
- Mobile Police Department of Provincial Public Security
- Central Highlands Mobile Police Regiment (E20):
  1. 1st Battalion (Gia Lai)
  2. 2nd Battalion (Đắk Lắk)
  3. 3rd Battalion (Lâm Đồng)
- Southwestern Mobile Police Regiment (E21):
  1. 1st Battalion (Cần Thơ)
  2. 2nd Battalion (Trà Vinh)
  3. 3rd Battalion (An Giang)
  4. 4th Battalion (Bạc Liêu)
  5. 5th Battalion (Phú Quốc – Kiên Giang)
- Capital Mobile Police Regiment (E22), (Hanoi):
  1. 1st Battalion (Hanoi)
  2. 2nd Battalion (Hanoi)
  3. 3rd Battalion (Hưng Yên)
  4. 4th Battalion (Hà Nam)
- South Central Mobile Police Regiment (E23):
  1. 1st Battalion (Bình Định)
  2. 2nd Battalion (Khánh Hoà)
  3. 3rd Battalion (Quảng Ngãi)
- Northwestern Mobile Police Regiment (E24):
  1. 1st Battalion (Điện Biên)
  2. 2nd Battalion (Sơn La)
  3. 3rd Battalion (Yên Bái)
  4. 4th Battalion (Lào Cai)
- South East Mobile Police Regiment (E25):
  1. 1st Battalion (Đồng Nai)
  2. 2nd Battalion (Bình Dương)
  3. 3rd Battalion (Bình Thuận)
- North Central Mobile Police Regiment (E26):
  1. 1st Battalion (Nghệ An)
  2. 4th Battalion (Thanh Hóa)
  3. 2nd Battalion (Hà Tĩnh)
  4. 3rd Battalion (Quảng Bình)
- Northeastern Mobile Police Regiment (E27), (Quảng Ninh):
1. 1st Battalion (Quảng Ninh)
2. 2nd Battalion (Lạng Sơn)
3. 3rd Battalion (Thái Nguyên)
- Central Mobile Police Regiment (E28), (Da Nang):
  1. 1st Battalion (Đà Nẵng)
  2. 2nd Battalion (Huế)
  3. 3rd Battalion (Quảng Nam)

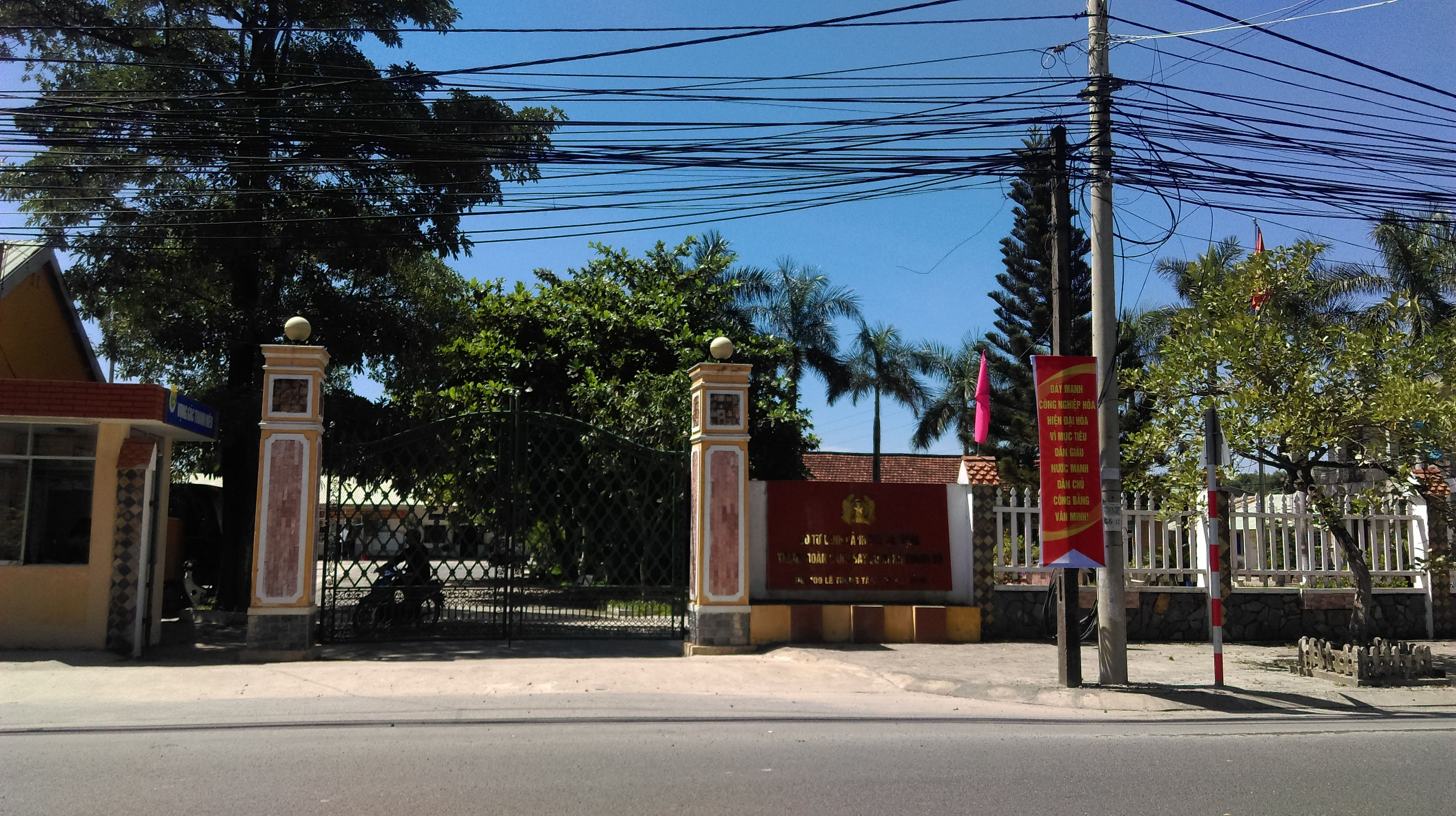
Central Command of Mobile Police Regiment (E28), Lê Trọng Tấn street, Hòa Phát ward, Cẩm Lệ district, Da Nang.

- Ho Chi Minh City Southeast Mobile Police Regiment (E29):
  1. 1st Battalion (Ho Chi Minh City)
  2. 2nd Battalion (Ho Chi Minh City)
  3. 3rd Battalion (Long An)
  4. Battalion for protection of targets and special cargo(Ho Chi Minh City)
  5. Ceremonial Company (Ho Chi Minh City)
- Police regiment for protection of diplomatic targets (E30) – (Hanoi)
- Police regiment for protection of political, economic, cultural, social, scientific and technical objectives (E31) – (Hanoi City)
- Airborne Special Forces Regiment (E32) - (Hanoi City)
- Police battalion for protection of special cargo transport (Hanoi City)
- 1st Special Police Battalion (Hanoi)
- 3rd Special Police Battalion (Da Nang)
- 2nd Special Police Battalion (Ho Chi Minh City)
- Special Cavalry Regiment

=== Aviation component ===
Police Aviation Regiment
- Trung đoàn Không quân Công an nhân dân
- Active: 11 October 2021
- Country: Vietnam
- Branch: Mobile Police
- Type: Police aviation
- Garrison/HQ: Gia Bình, Bắc Ninh
- Nicknames: E32; PSAR; Police Air Force; Public Security Air Regiment
- Equipment: Mi-8 and Mi-17 Helicopters; Unmanned aerial vehicles; Balloons

The Police Aviation Regiment (PSAR; Vietnamese: Trung đoàn Không quân Công an nhân dân, lit. 'Air Force Regiment of the People's Public Security'), also designated as E32, is established as a body under the Mobile Police Command and the first ever police aviation unit in Vietnam. To be equipped with helicopters which will become the main assets, PSAR is also responsible for the civil defence missions in Vietnam besides its eventual security and law enforcement functions. The establishment of PSAR is eventually assisted by the Vietnam People's Air Force and its associated personnel.

== Awards ==
- Order of Ho Chi Minh (2014)
- Hero of the People's Armed Forces (twice)

== Commanders through the ages ==
=== Commanders ===
Order	Name	Rank	Time in office	Position	Note
1	Nguyễn Văn Vượng	39x39px Lieutenant-General	2009 – September 2016	Commander of Mobile Police Command	Director of the Police Department of Justice Protection and Support Deputy Director General of the General Department of Police
2	Phạm Quốc Cương	39x39px Lieutenant-General	October 2016–present	Commander of Mobile Police Command	Former Deputy Commander of Mobile Police, Ministry of Public Security.

=== Political commissars ===
- March 2014 – August 2018, Đỗ Đức Kính, Major General, Lieutenant General (2014), former Director of Phú Thọ Provincial Police

=== Deputy commanders ===
- Deputy Commander: Major general Nguyễn Duy Hải
- Deputy Commander: Major general Trần Quang Họa
- Deputy Commander: Major general Nguyễn Thanh Bảnh
- Deputy Commander: Major general Hoàng Thọ Mạnh
- Deputy Commander: Major general Phạm Quốc Cương (now Lieutenant-General, Mobile Police Commander)
- Deputy Commander: Major general Nguyễn Văn Uy
- Deputy Commander: Major general Vũ Ngọc Riềm
- Deputy Commander: Major general Ngô Văn Tiếu
- Deputy Commander: Major general Nguyễn Quốc Tuấn
- Deputy Commander: Senior colonel Phạm Văn Lân
- Deputy Commander: Senior colonel Nguyễn Quốc Đoàn (now a member of the 13th Party Central Committee – Standing Deputy Secretary of Thừa Thiên Huế Provincial Party Committee)
- Deputy Commander: Major general Bùi Tiến Cam retired
- Deputy Commander: Senior colonel Nguyễn Văn Diện

=== Deputy political commissars ===
- March 2014 – June 2018: Colonel Vũ Hồng Văn (now Director of Đồng Nai Provincial Police)
