= TT-400TP gunboat =

Gunboat of the Vietnam People's Navy

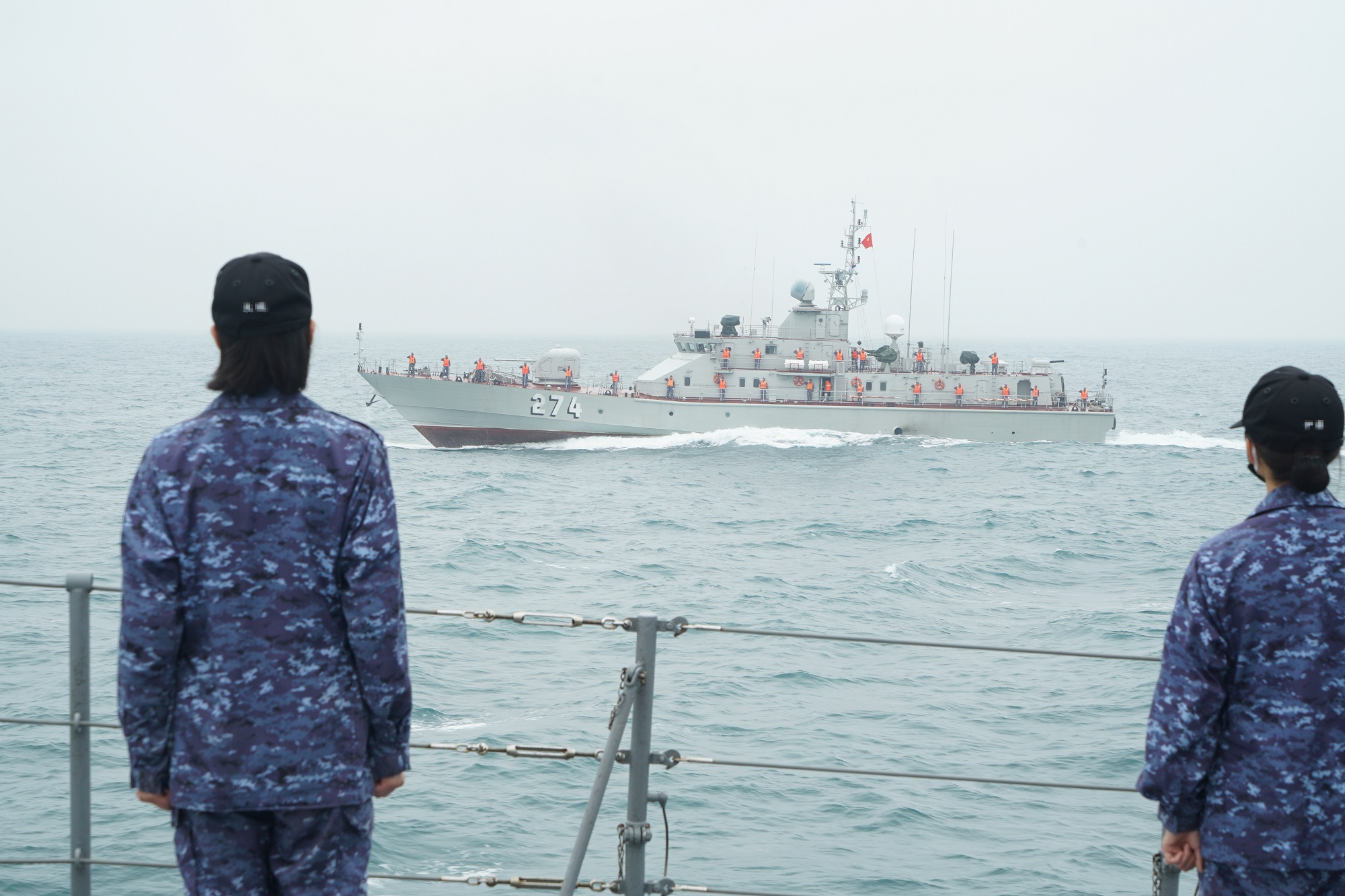
- Ship 274

Class overview
- Name: TT-400TP class gunboat
- Builders: Z173 Shipyard
- Operators: Vietnam People's Navy
- Cost: US$1,000,000 Unarmed
- In commission: 2011

General characteristics
- Displacement: 378 tons (standard), 420 tons (combat load), 455 tons (full load)
- Length: 54.16 metres (177.6 feet)
- Beam: 9.16 metres (30 feet)
- Draught: 2.7 metres (8.8 feet)
- Speed: up to 32 knots (59 km/h; 37 mph)
- Range: 2,500 miles
- Endurance: 30 days
- Crew: 28
- Sensors & processing systems: Radar: MR-123/176 Vympel/Bass Tilt, Bass Tilt AK-630 fire-control
- Armament: 1 x 76.2mm AK-176 main gun; 1 x 30mm AK-630 CIWS; 2 x KPVT 14.5mm heavy machine gun

The TT-400TP is the first class of warship designed and built by Vietnam in Z173 Shipyard. This class is based on the "Lan" project designed by the Ukrainian State Research and Design Shipbuilding Center.

The name "TT-400TP" is abbreviated by Vietnamese words: TT is Tuần Tra (Patrol), 400 is over 400 tons, TP is Tàu Pháo (gunboat).

The ships were constructed under the purview of Colonel Nguyen Van Cuong.

== History ==
The first TT-400TP was constructed in 2009, following by sea trials in 2011. The second TT-400TP ship, known as 274, was handed over on May 28, 2014.

The 3rd and 4th TT-400TP ships, known as 272 and 273, were commissioned on October 25, 2014. As of May 2017, 6 TT-400TPs are known to be in service.

In 2015, Asia Times reported rumors that the Philippines was potentially willing to purchase TT-400TP ships.

As of 2023, the Vietnamese navy has six TT-400TPs in service.

== Design ==
TT-400TP class ships have gun control automatic weapons on the sea with four tasks: destroying hostile amphibious ships and corvettes of the enemy and protecting the base of the amphibious fleet and fleet escort in the operation of ships in service forces and forces scan mines, protection of civilian ships at sea and tactical reconnaissance planes of the water.

Z173 shipyard engineers were involved in the construction after being trained abroad.

Its speed is 32 nautical miles per hour and it can operate on sea for 30 days. It has a length of 54.16m, a width of 9.16m and a full load displacement of 480 tons.

The ship is equipped with AK-630 anti-aircraft guns, AK-176 cannons, 2x 14.5 machine guns and Igla MANPADs.

The TT-400TP is manufactured for $1 million USD.

== Ships ==
Operator	Number	Project	Builder	Laid Down	Launched	Commissioned	Fleet	Status
Vietnam People's Navy	272	TT-400TP gunboat	Z173 Shipyard	09.2009	09.2011	16.01.2012	2nd Regional Command, Vietnam People's Navy	active
Vietnam People's Navy	273	TT-400TP gunboat	Z173 Shipyard	08.2010	03.2012	31.08.2012	2nd Regional Command, Vietnam People's Navy	active
Vietnam People's Navy	274	TT-400TP gunboat	Z173 Shipyard	10.2012	03.2014	28.05.2014	2nd Regional Command, Vietnam People's Navy	active
Vietnam People's Navy	275	TT-400TP gunboat	Z173 Shipyard			25.09.2014	2nd Regional Command, Vietnam People's Navy	active
Vietnam People's Navy	276	TT-400TP gunboat	Z173 Shipyard				2nd Regional Command, Vietnam People's Navy	active
Vietnam People's Navy	277	TT-400TP gunboat	Z173 Shipyard				2nd Regional Command, Vietnam People's Navy	active
