= People's Public Security of Vietnam =

Vietnamese main police and security forces

People's Public Security of Vietnam Công an Nhân dân Việt Nam
- Emblem

- Front Badge

- Patch

- Flag
- Common name: police (cảnh sát), public security (công an)
- Abbreviation: PPS (CAND)
- Motto: Protecting the Fatherland's Security; Bảo vệ an ninh tổ quốc

Agency overview
- Formed: 19 August 1945
- Legal personality: Police force

Jurisdictional structure
- Operations jurisdiction: Vietnam

Operational structure
- Elected officer responsible: General Lương Tam Quang, Minister of Public Security
- Parent agency: Ministry of Public Security
- Child agencies: People's Security Force of Vietnam; People's Police Force of Vietnam

Notables
- Significant operation: Nghệ-Tĩnh Soviets; Attack on Ôn Như Hầu Street; CM-12 Plan; Gangs of Nam Cam; PMU 18 Corruption; 2023 Đắk Lắk attacks
- Anniversary: 19 August

Website
- www.mps.gov.vn (Vietnamese)
- March: We Are The Policemen (authored by Professor, People's Artist Trọng Bằng); Colors: Yellow Red Green

The People's Public Security of Vietnam (Vietnamese: Công an Nhân dân Việt Nam), alternatively the People's Public Security Forces (PPS; Vietnamese: Lực lượng Công an Nhân dân - CAND), also recognized by its Vietnamese short name Công an (lit. 'the Public Security', IPA: [kəwŋ͡m˧˧ ʔaːn˧˧]) or the Vietnamese Police as a loose translation, is the national police and the principal domestic security force of Vietnam.

== Functions and branches ==
The People's Public Security of Vietnam has two branches: the People's Security and the People's Police (including Civil Defense forces). These two forces are trained and educated mainly at two institutions, the People's Police Academy and the People's Security Academy, both located in the capital city of Hanoi.

The People's Security prevents, investigates, and eliminates potential actions from enemies of the Vietnamese state that could endanger national security. It engages in espionage and joins forces with other uniformed bodies as established by law in internal political security, economic security, ideological and cultural security, network security, and informational security. It manages entrance and exit visas, border security crossing and checkpoints, and immigration stations in airports, as well as in securing foreigners and Vietnamese expats during their visits to the country. It also defends the secrecy of the government of the republic against external and internal threats and helps to build personal security in every aspect of life and every area of the country.

The People's Police prevents, investigates, and solves issues relating to environmental, political, traffic, functional, and corruption-related criminal activities in keeping with the laws of the Socialist Republic. It also work with the general public in preventing participation in criminal actions, and perform responsibilities and duties about identification security, public security, transport security, road and highway safety, firefighting, civil defense, disaster preparedness and response, managing the Mobile Police Command, and many other duties and missions assigned by the Constitution and the laws of the Socialist Republic of Vietnam.

In accordance with the Vietnamese law, both branches perform several other missions and responsibilities under orders from the Vietnamese government.

== Tasks and powers ==
- To collect information, analyze, evaluate, and predict situations and propose to the Party and the State to promulgate and direct the implementation of guidelines, policies, laws, and strategies to protect national security and maintain social order and safety. To propose the combination of requirements of the strategies on protection of national security and maintenance of social order and safety with those strategies and policies on socio-economic construction and development, national defense, and the State's external relations.
- To protect the freedom rights, democracy, life and property of the people; to protect high-ranking leading officials of the Party and the State and foreign guests; to safeguard important events, targets and key projects of national security, foreign representative offices, representatives of Vietnam-based international organizations, individuals holding or closely related to state secrets.
- To receive and process reports and denouncements on crimes, initiate criminal lawsuits and investigate crimes, and perform other judicial tasks according to the provisions of law.
- To sanction administrative violations and apply other administrative handling measures as provided for by law.
- To guide, inspect, and examine agencies, organizations, and citizens in performing the task of protecting national security and maintaining social order and safety; to conduct the law propagation, dissemination, and education, and build up "the whole population protects the Fatherland's security" movement.
- To apply mass mobilization, legal, diplomatic, economic, scientific-technical, professional, and armed measures to protect national security and maintain social order and safety.
- To use weapons, supporting tools, and necessary technical and professional means in attacking crimes and making self-defense according to the provisions of law.
- In case of necessity, to issue decisions on or propose the suspension or termination of operations of agencies, organizations or individuals which are detrimental to national security, social order and safety; to requisition means of transport, communication equipments and other technical means of agencies, organizations, individuals and operators or users of such means according to the provisions of law.
- To request agencies, organizations, or individuals to coordinate activities and supply information related to national security, social order, and safety.
- To closely coordinate with the People's Army, Self-Defense and Militia Forces, and state agencies in protecting national security, maintaining social order and safety, and defending national independence, sovereignty, unity, and territorial integrity.
- To research and apply modern scientific and technological achievements in protecting national security and maintaining social order and safety.
- To build up the forces of political, ideological, organizational, and professional cleanliness and strength.
- To enter into international cooperation on protection of national security and social order and safety.

== Organisational system ==
Being a component of the People's Armed Forces of Vietnam alongside the Military and the Militia, PPS is placed under political leadership of the Communist Party of Vietnam (via the Public Security Central Party Committee - Đảng ủy Công an Trung ương as the political head) and the executive administration of the Ministry of Public Security (Government of Vietnam).

The PPS's powers are regulated under No. 73/2014/QH13, which was passed on 27 November 2014.

The organisational system of the People's Public Security Forces is composed of the Ministry of Public Security, headed by the Minister.

Subordinate to the Ministry are the municipalities and provinces' Departments of Public Security, headed by Police Directors.

As of March 2025, the MPS has dissolved 694 district, commune, ward, and township-level Public Security offices/posts as part of a massive overhaul of the PPSV.

== Ranks ==
=== Officers ===
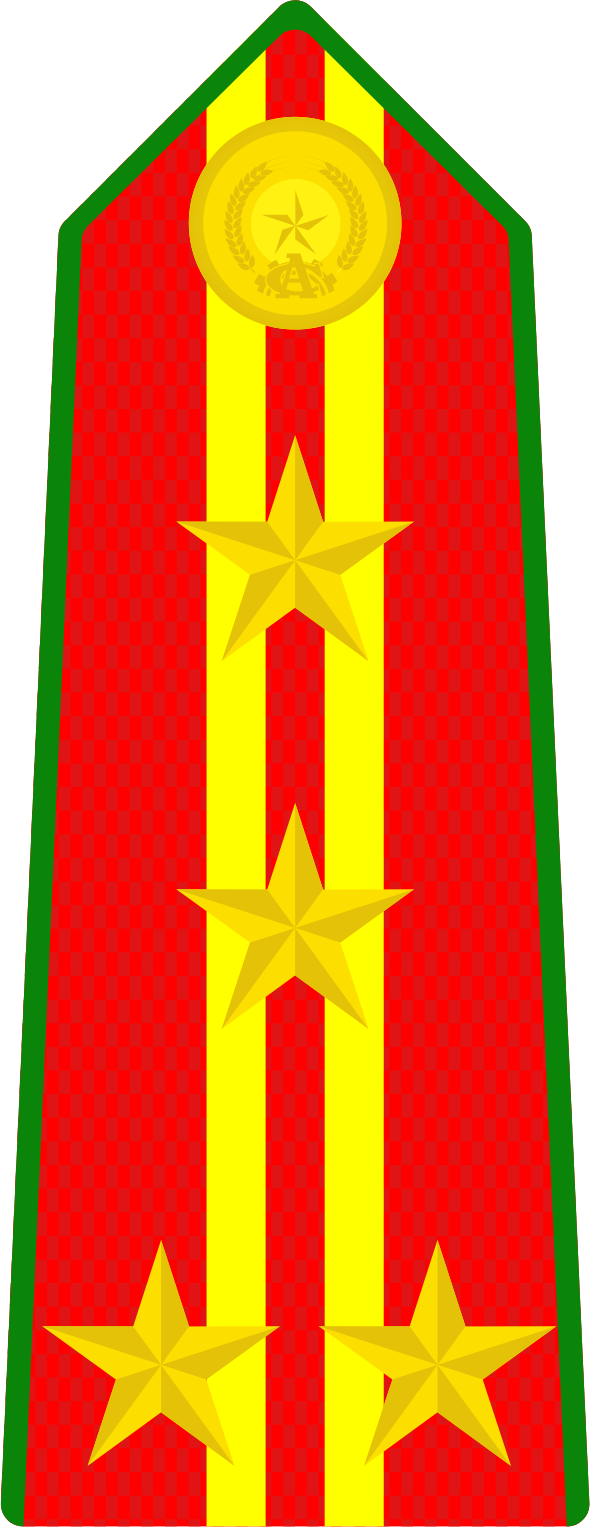
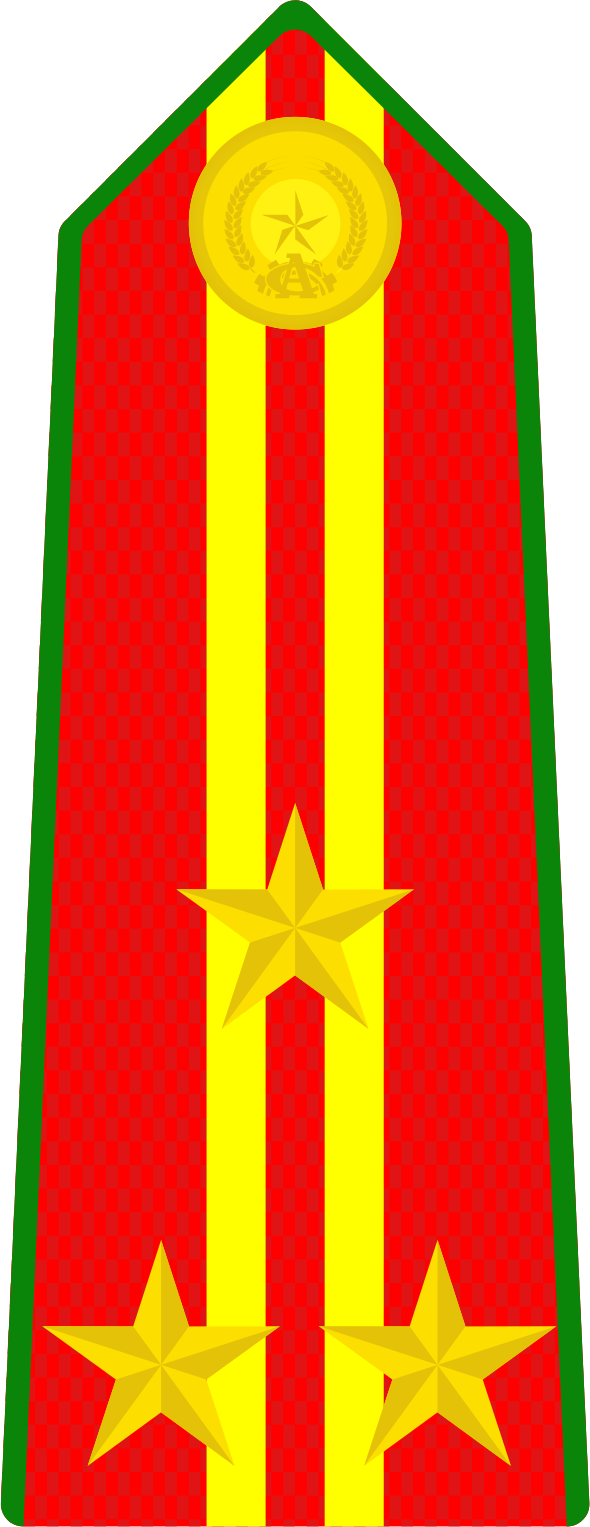
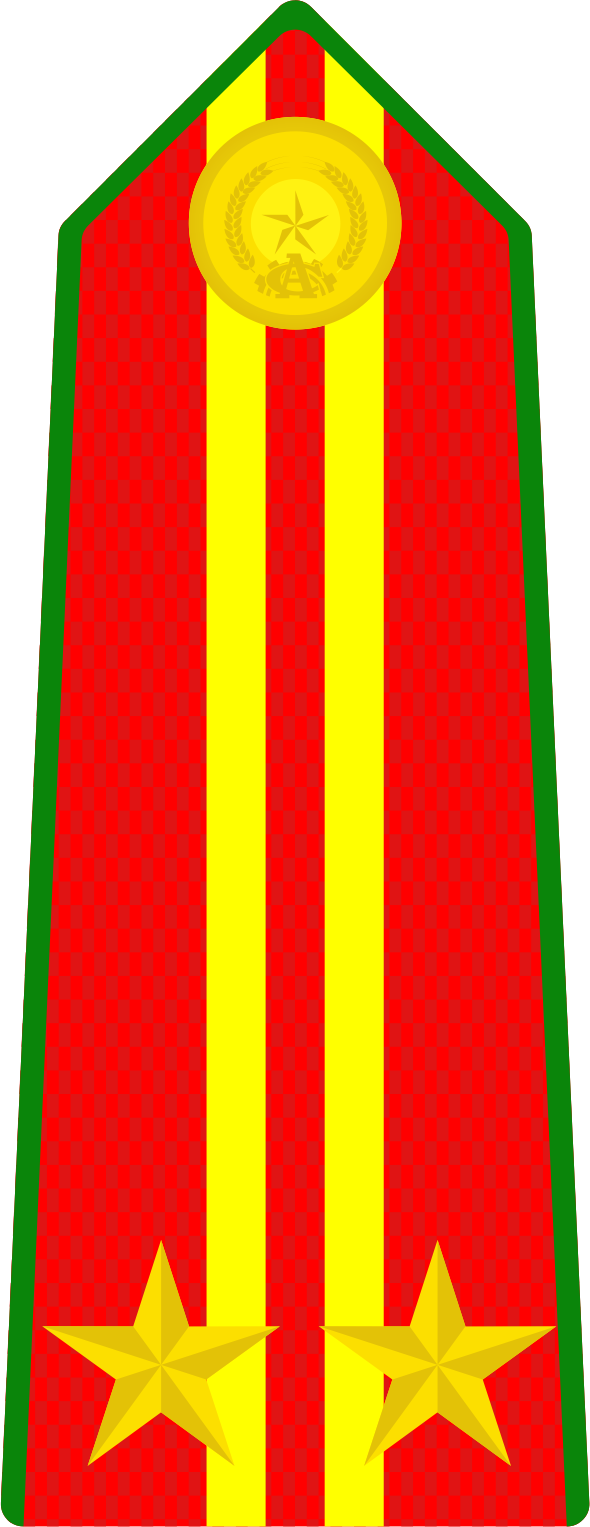
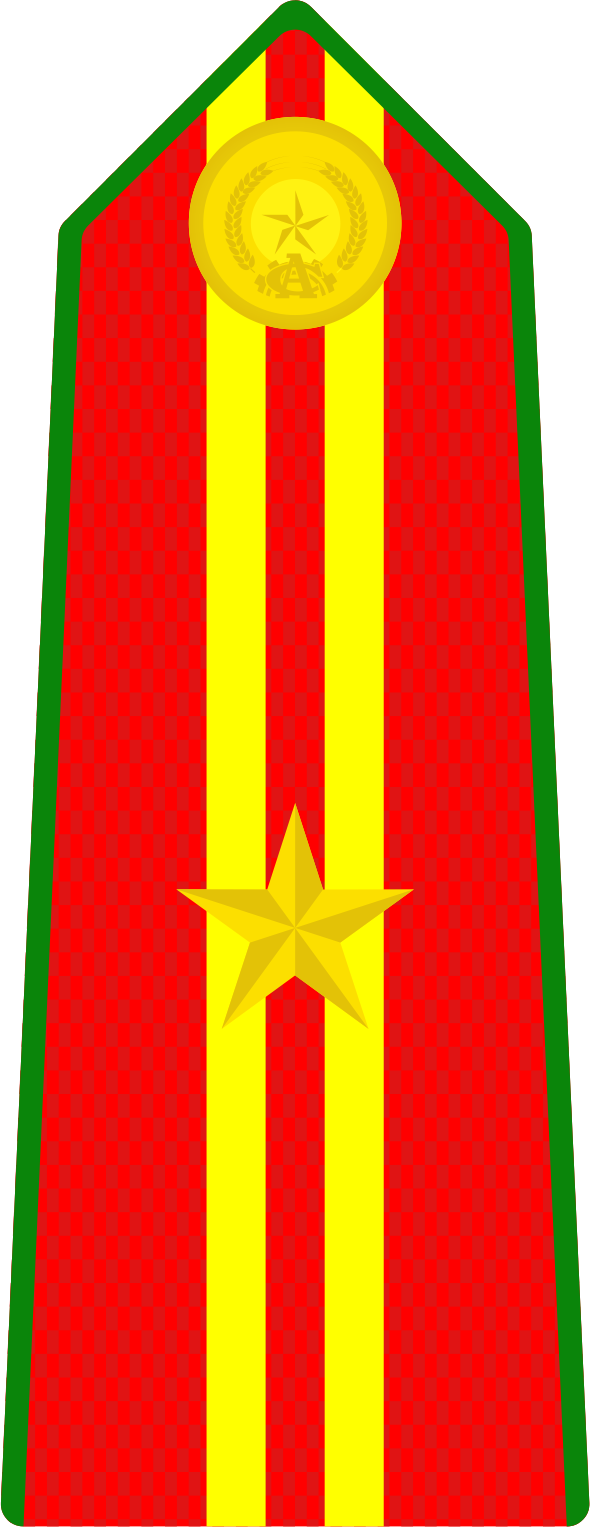
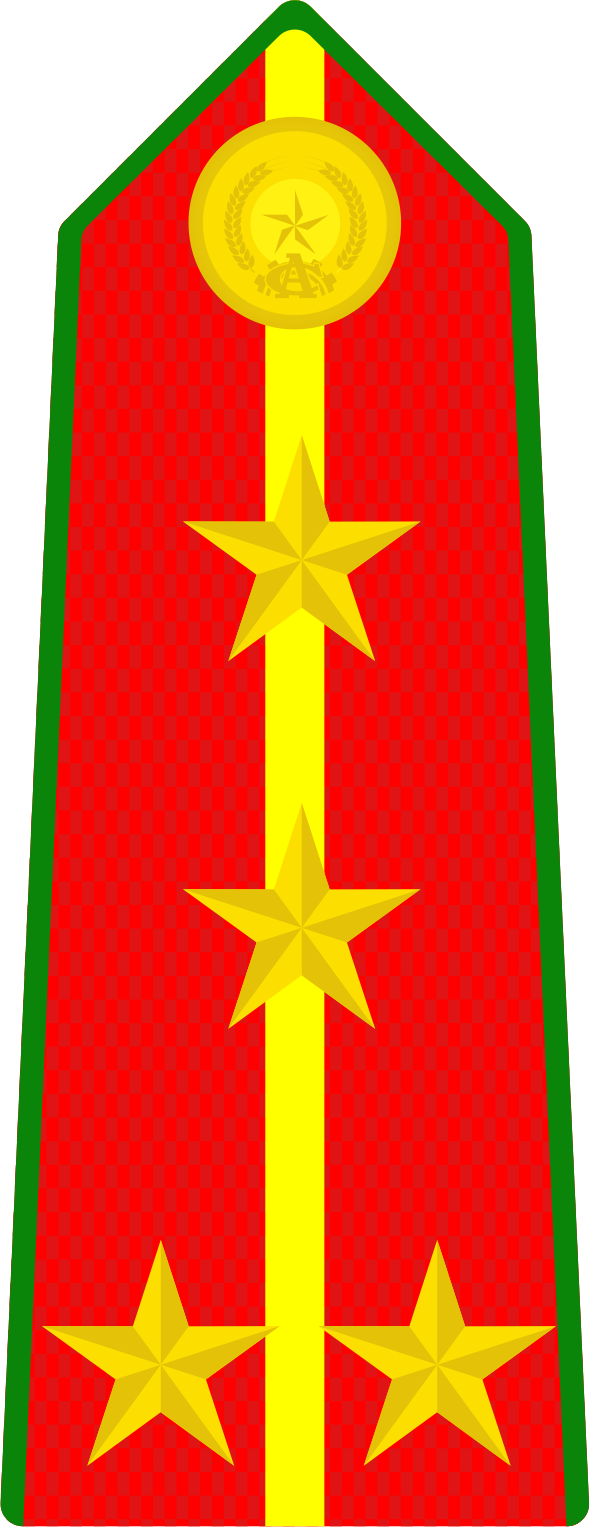
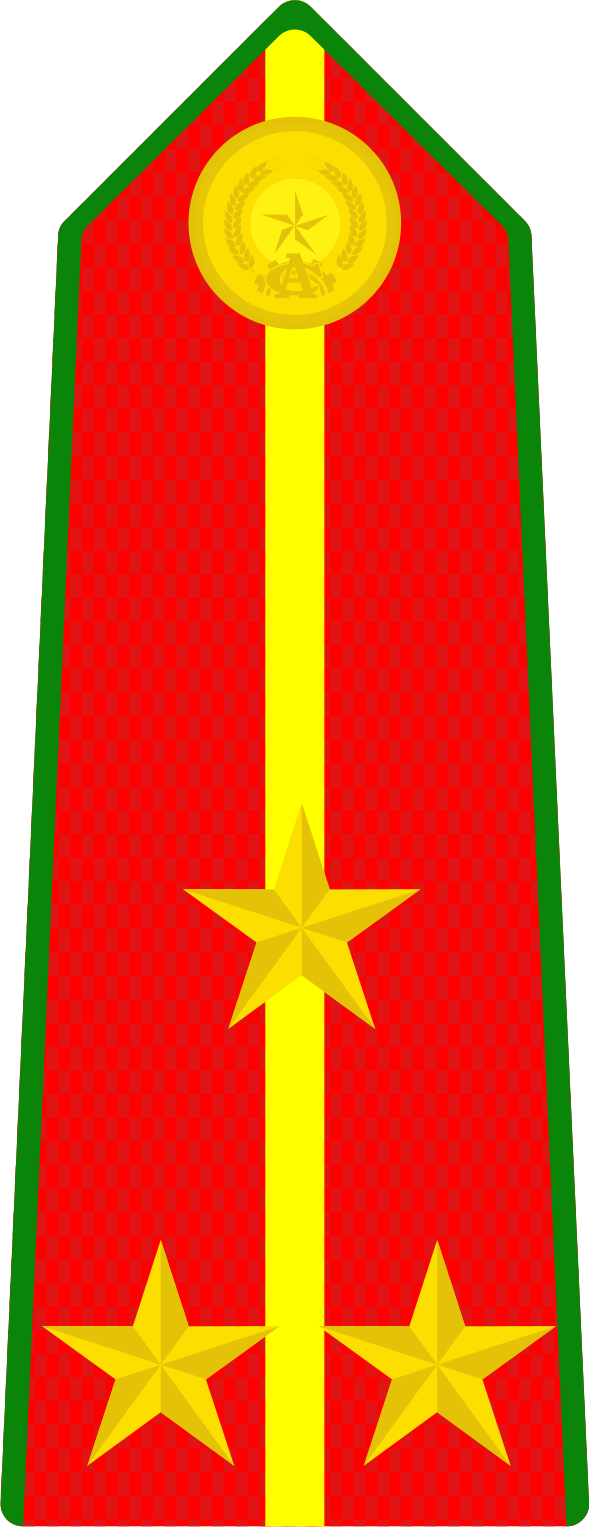
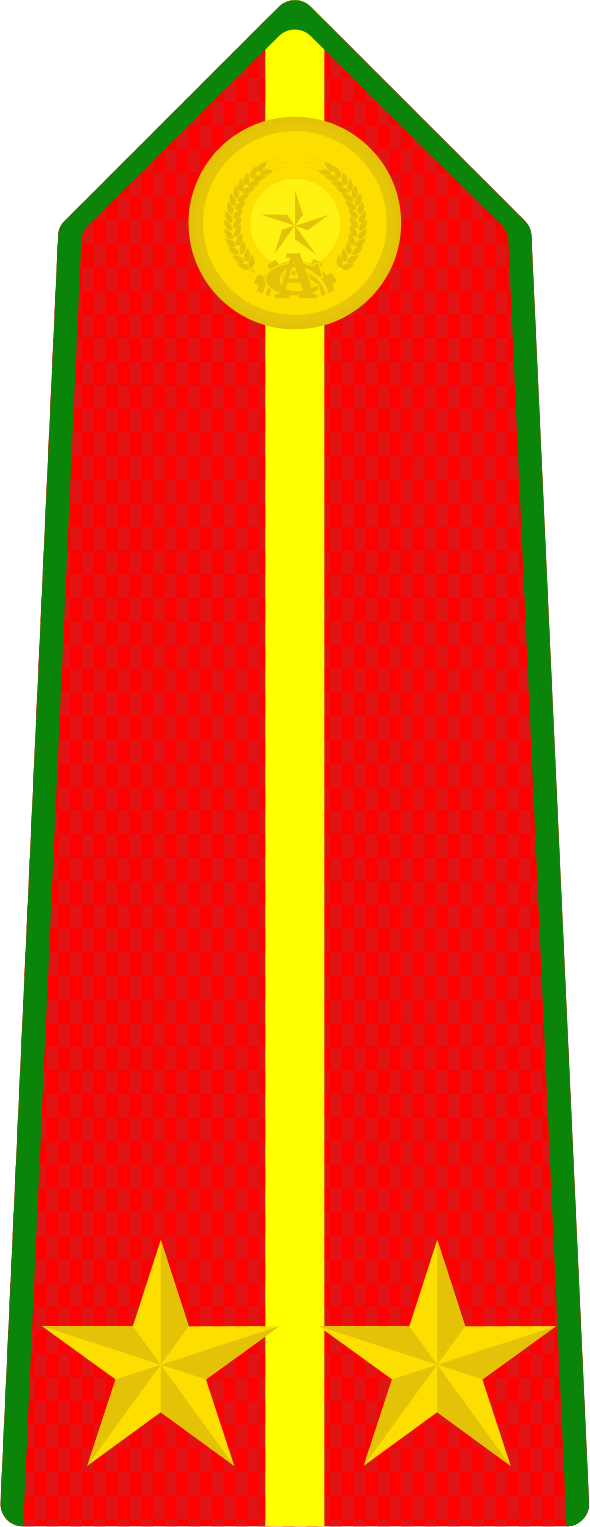
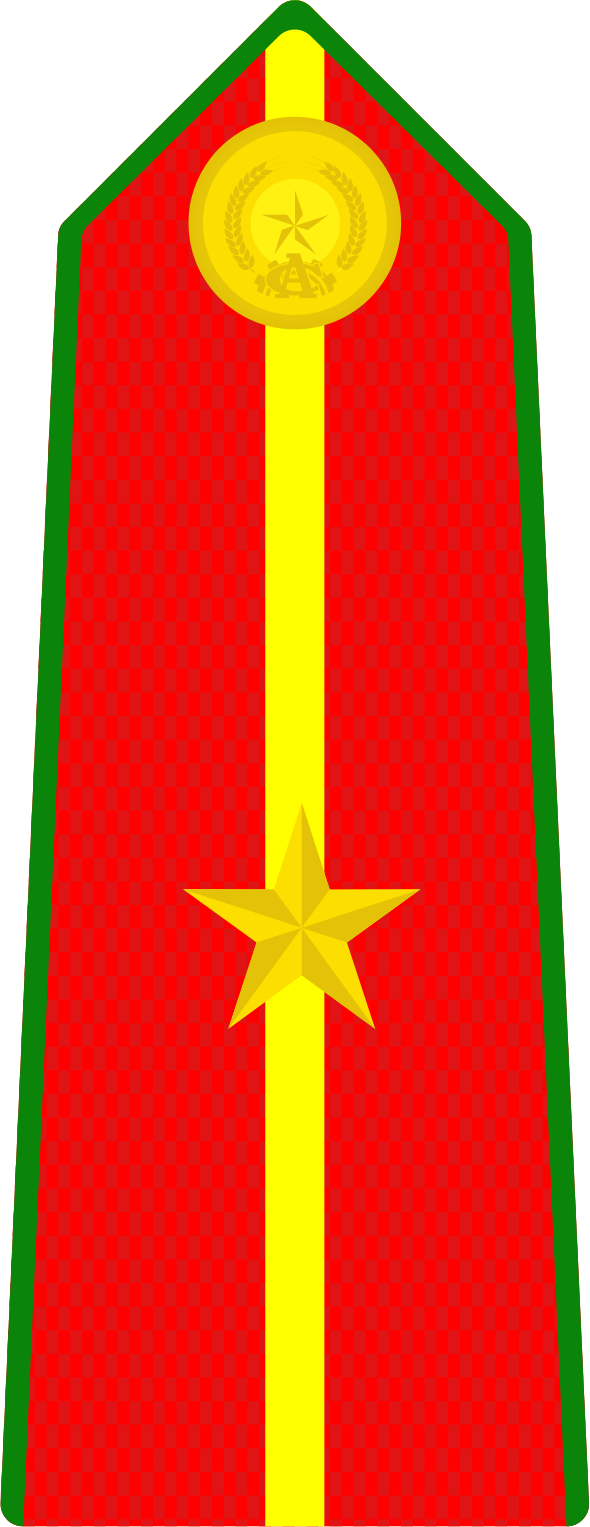
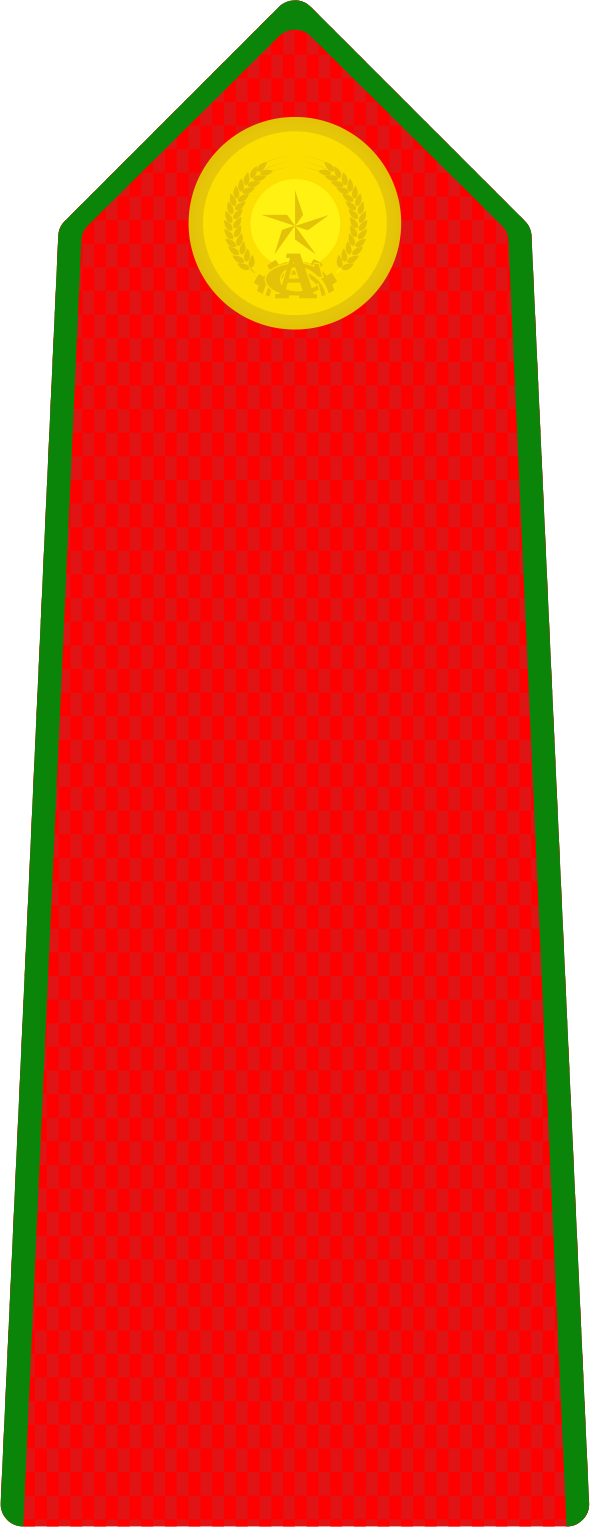
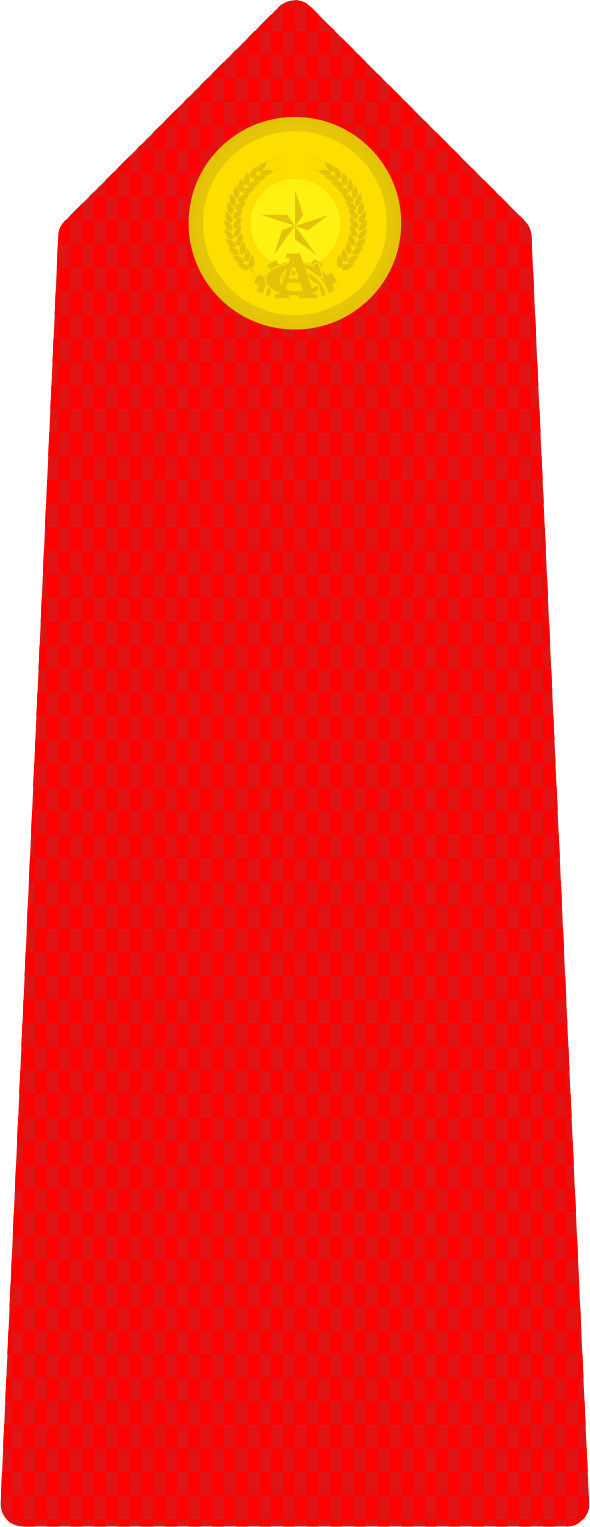
Rank group	General / flag officers				Senior officers				Junior officers
	Highest rank				Middle rank				Lower rank
Vietnam People's; Public Security
Vietnam People's; Public Security	General (Đại tướng)	Colonel general (Thượng tướng)	Lieutenant general (Trung tướng)	Major general (Thiếu tướng)	Senior colonel (Đại tá)	Colonel (Thượng tá)	Lieutenant colonel (Trung tá)	Major (Thiếu tá)	Captain (Đại úy)	Senior lieutenant (Thượng úy)	Lieutenant (Trung úy)	Second lieutenant (Thiếu úy)	University - college cadet (Học viên Đại học - Cao đẳng)	Intermediate - primary student (Học viên Trung cấp - Sơ cấp)

=== NCOs and enlisted ===
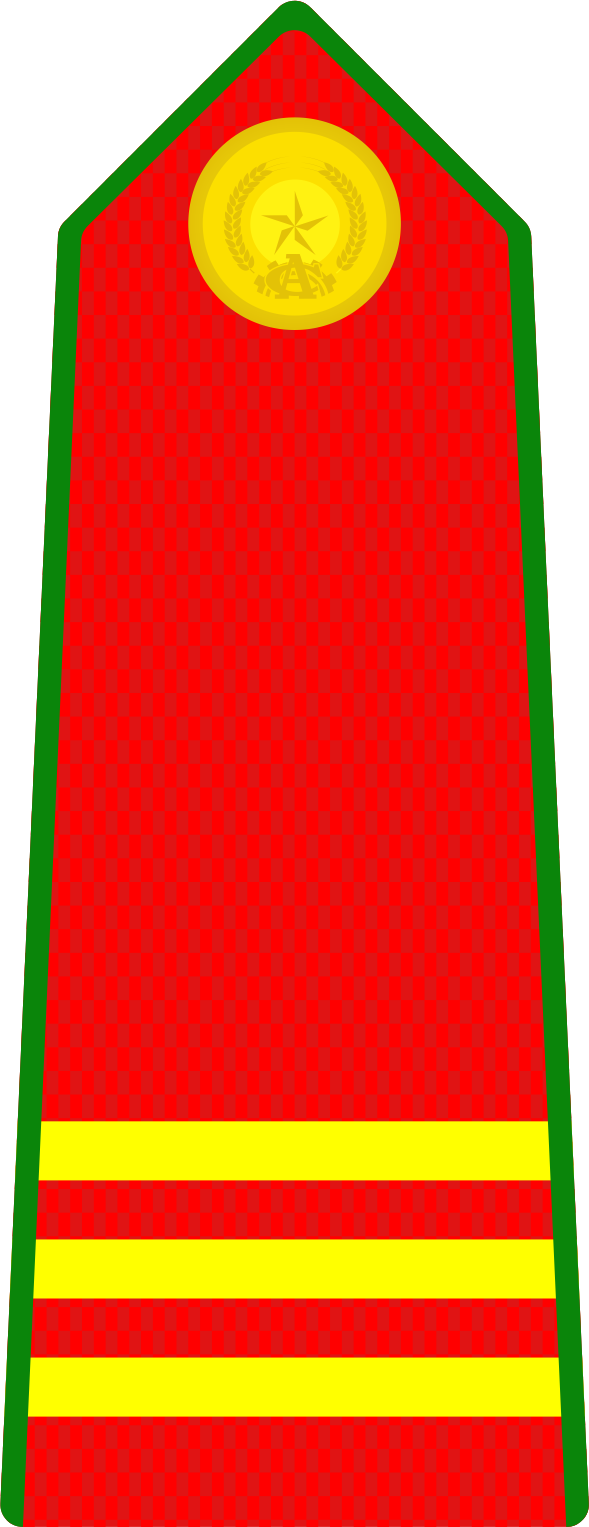
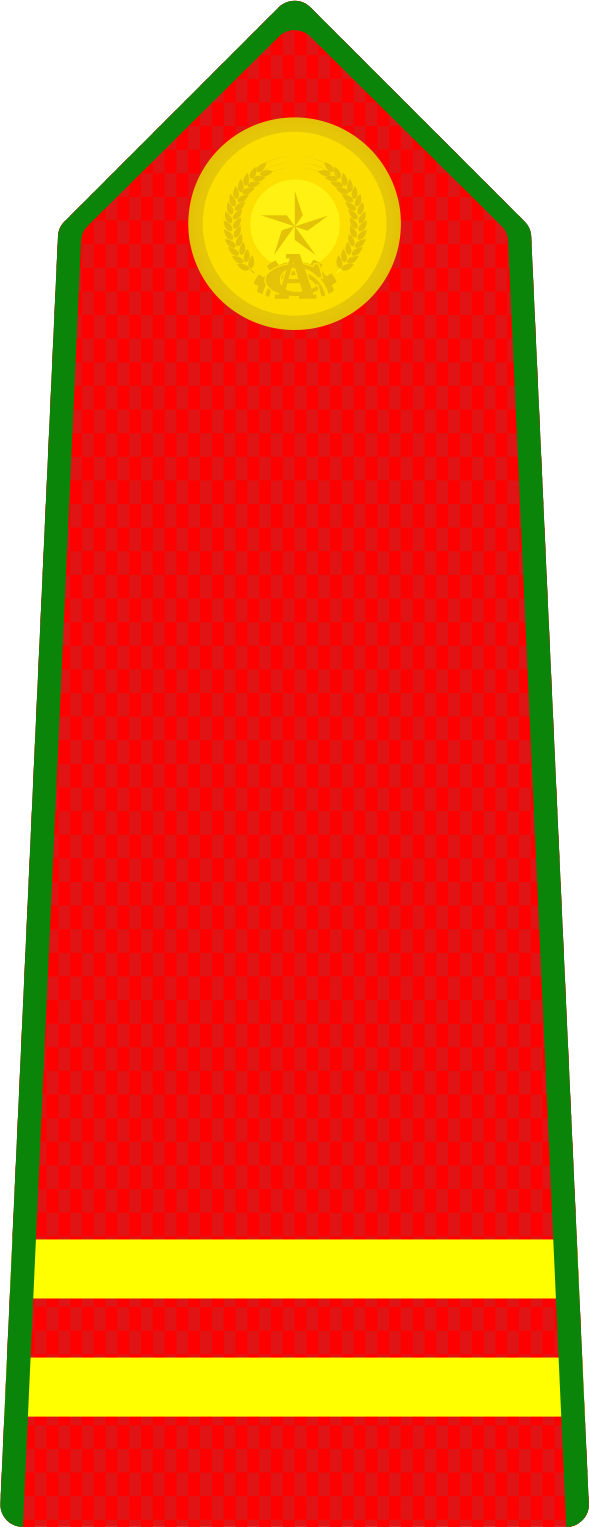
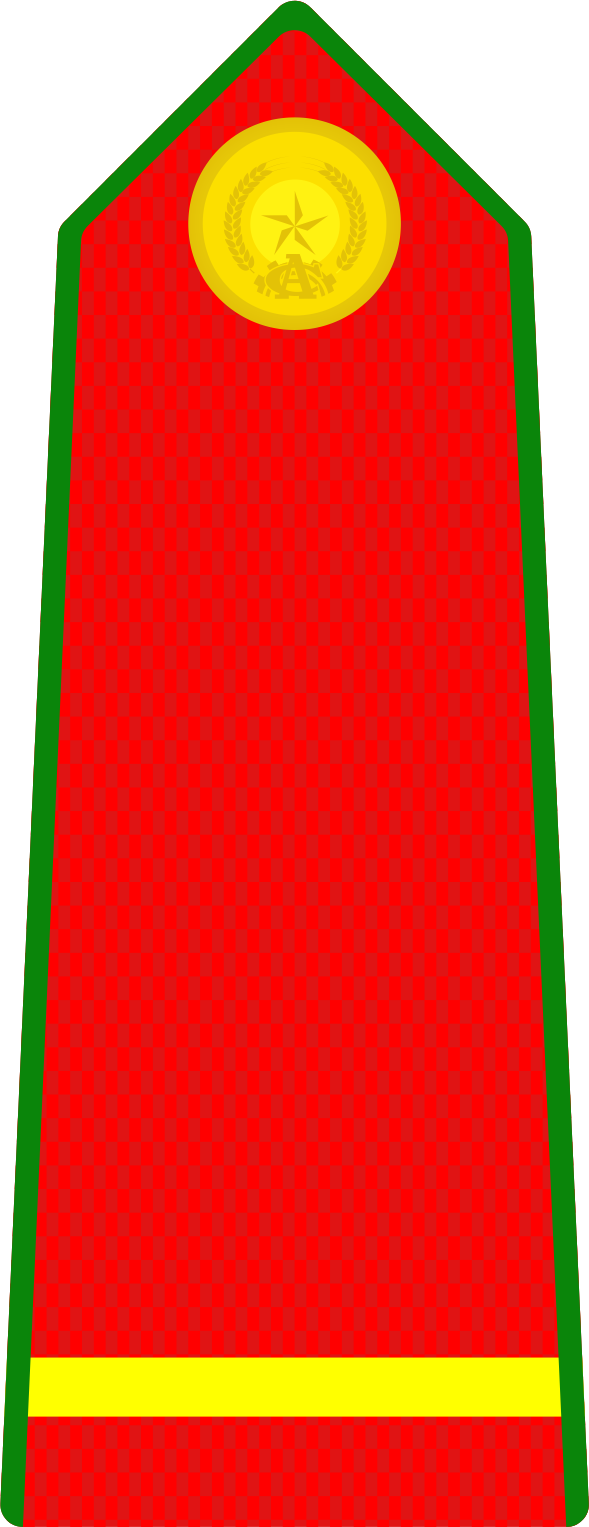
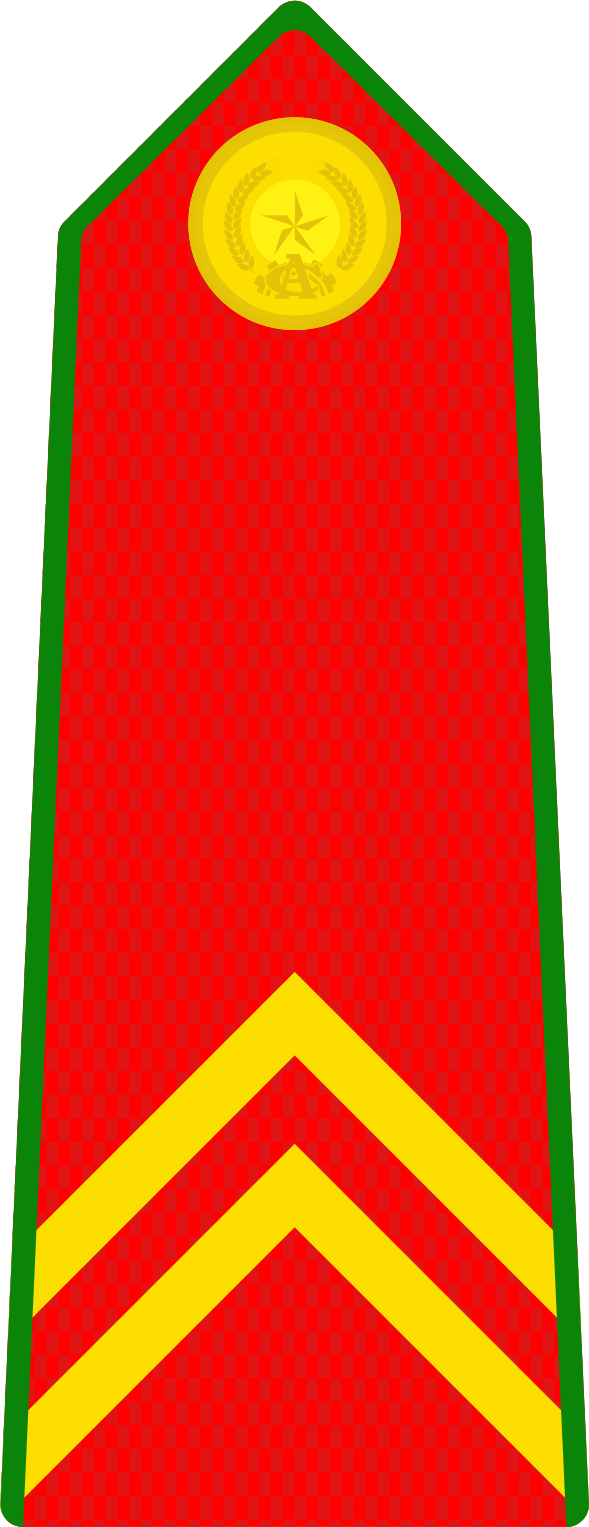
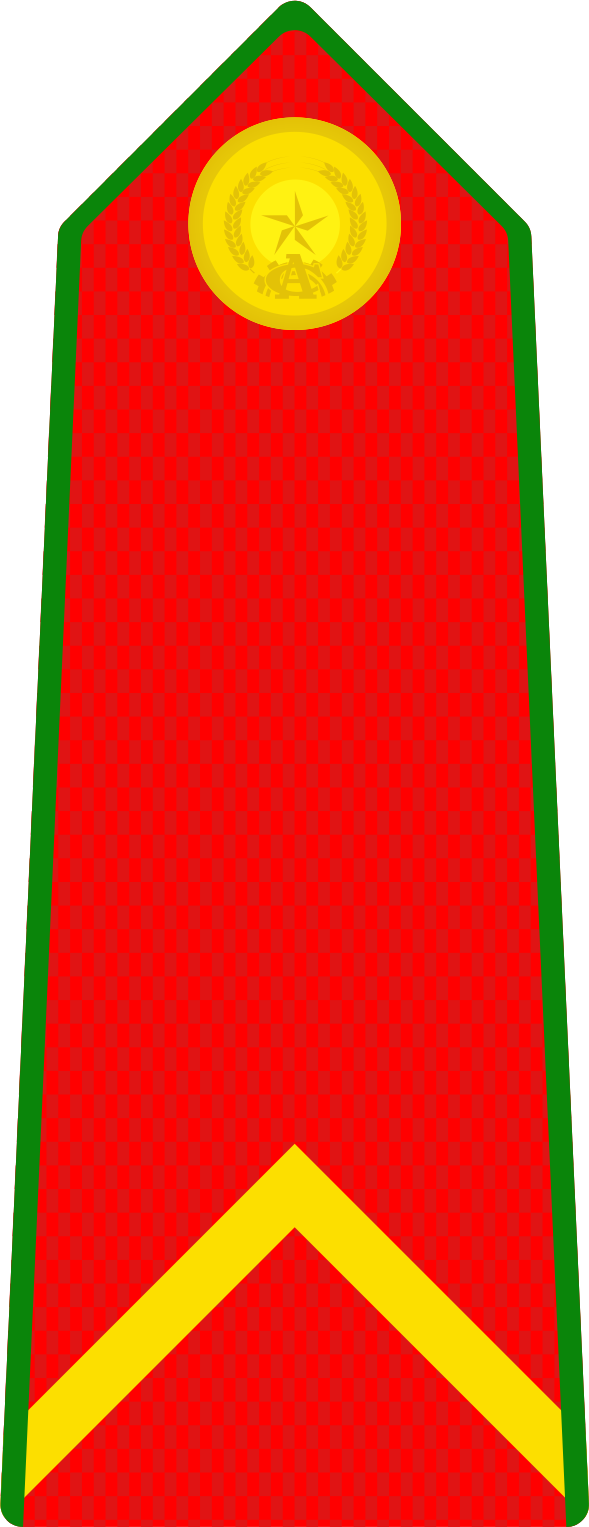
Rank group	Senior NCOs		Junior NCOs	Enlisted
	Non-commissioned officers			Police officers
Vietnam People's; Public Security
Vietnam People's; Public Security	Master sergeant (Thượng sĩ)	Sergeant (Trung sĩ)	Corporal (Hạ sĩ)	Constable 1st class (Chiến sĩ bậc 1)	Constable 2nd class (Chiến sĩ bậc 2)

== Equipment ==
=== Support tools ===
- Baton
- Handcuffs
- Stun gun
- Pepper Spray
- Flashlight
- CornerShot

Image	Model	Type	Origin
Makarov (28034065)	K59	Semi-automatic pistol	China
Tokarev TT33 (6825679152)	K54	Semi-automatic pistol	China
CZ 75 first version "short rail" 1975-79	CZ-75	Semi-automatic pistol	Czechoslovakia
CZ 82, caliber 9 x 18 mm Makarov. Czech Military Pistol.	CZ-83	Semi-automatic pistol	Czechoslovakia
Glock 17 (6825676904) без фона	Glock	Semi-automatic pistol	Austria
Beretta APX standard W	Beretta APX	Semi-automatic pistol	Italy
BerettaPX4Storm	Beretta Px4 Storm	Semi-automatic pistol	Italy
	P-64	Semi-automatic pistol	Poland
	HS-9	Semi-automatic pistol	Croatia
Flickr - ~Steve Z~ - 870	Remington Model 870	Shotgun	United States
Heckler & Koch MP5-1	Heckler & Koch MP5	Submachine gun	Germany
Uzi Pro	Micro Uzi	Submachine gun	Israel
CZ SCORPION EVO 3 A1	CZ Scorpion Evo 3	Submachine gun	Czech Republic
Modern AK-47 Type 2	AK-47	Rifle	Soviet Union
	AKM	Rifle	Soviet Union
Simonow SKS 45 noBG	SKS	Rifle	Soviet Union
IWI-Tavor-TAR-21w1	IWI Tavor	Rifle	Israel
STV3801	STV rifle	Rifle	Vietnam
MSG 90 rifle 2014 noBG	PSR 90	Rifle	Pakistan
ARMS & Hunting 2012 exhibition (473-24)	APR 308	Rifle	Switzerland
Interpolitex 2013 (536-15)	SVD	Rifle	Soviet Union
	CZ 750	Rifle	Czech Republic
	Orsis T-5000	Rifle	Russia
	RPK	Machine gun	Soviet Union
RPD-44, light Russian machine gun	RPD	Machine gun	Soviet Union
MITRALOZ 12.7 mm KA	DSHK	Machine gun	Soviet Union
M79 Grenade Launcher (7414625716)	M79	Grenade launcher	United States
	SPQN-E112	Grenade launcher	Vietnam
Gas gun	Model NARG-38	Grenade launcher	Vietnam
	SJ102	Grenade launcher	South Korea
RPG-7 detached	RPG-7	Grenade launcher	Soviet Union

== Vehicle ==
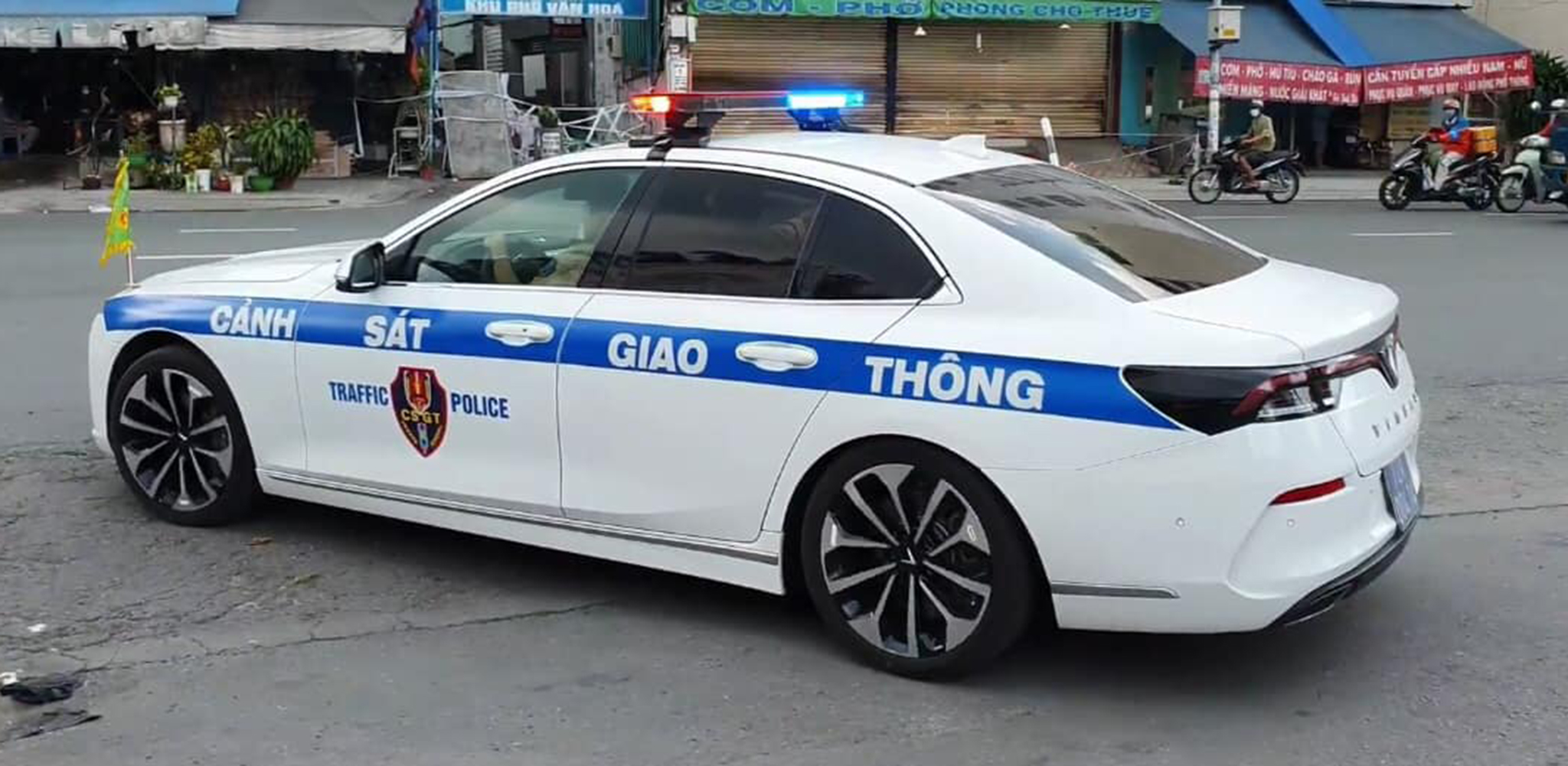
Vinfast Traffic Patrol Vehicle

=== Car/Motorcycle/Armored vehicle ===
- Honda Phantom 200
- Honda CB250, CB250X
- Honda CBR250R (Use for training)
- Honda CB300R
- Honda CB400 Super Four
- Honda ST series
- Honda CBX750
- Honda NC750X
- Yamaha XJ900P
- HONDA SHADOW AERO 750
- HONDA CB300F
- BMW R1250GSA
- Yamaha FJR1300
- HONDA GOLDWING 1500CC
- Honda Goldwing 1800cc
- Mitsubishi Pajero
- Mitsubishi Pajero Sport
- Mitsubishi Fuso Canter
- Mitsubishi Xpander
- Mitsubishi Triton
- Mazda BT-50
- Nissan Navara
- VinFast LUX A2.0
- VinFast LUX SA2.0
- Toyota Camry
- Toyota Corolla Altis
- Toyota Avalon
- Toyota Land Cruiser
- Toyota Fortuner
- Ford Super Duty
- Ford Transit
- Ford Explorer
- Ford Escape
- Ford Ranger
- BMW X5
- Dodge Charger (2005)
- Chevrolet Suburban
- Hummer H3
- Jino JRC-9000e
- Shinjeong S5
- RAM MK3
- IAG Guardian
- Inkas Sentry APC upgrade
- Honda CB500x
- Ford Everest
- Honda Winner150/WinnerX
- Yamaha Exciter
- Yamaha Jupiter
- Honda Future 125

=== Vessel ===
Class	Image	Type	Variant	Origin	Quantity	Notes
ST-428		Patrol boat		Vietnam	1 (+1)	Used by Waterway Police, part of the Traffic Police Department
ST-118		Patrol boat		Vietnam		Built by Hong Ha Shipbuilding.
ST-132		Patrol boat		Vietnam		Built by Hong Ha Shipbuilding for Hai Phong's police.
P class		Patrol boat	Type A/B	South Korea	2	Transfer from South Korea Coast Guard.
ST-225F1		Search and rescue boat		Vietnam	(+2)	Bulit for An Giang province police
ST-450		Canoe		Vietnam	+ 28	Used by the Department of Equipment and Logistics.
ST-660		Canoe		Vietnam		Built by Hong Ha Shipbuilding.

== See also ==
- People's Army of Vietnam
- Vietnam People's Navy
- Vietnam People's Air Force
- Vietnam Militia and Self-Defence Force
- People's Army of Vietnam Special Forces
- Naval Air Force, Vietnam People's Navy
- Vietnam Coast Guard
- Vietnam Fisheries Surveillance
