= Lan Trì kiến văn lục =

Lan Trì kiến văn lục (蘭池見聞錄) is a literary work of Vũ Trinh.

Vũ Trinh was a Confucianist and high-ranking mandarin in both Le-Trinh dynasty and Nguyen dynasty. He left some literary works. The book Lan Trì kiến văn lục is one of those and is composed of an introduction, forewords, preface and preamble (written in Literary Chinese by Vũ Trinh's colleagues) and 45 creative pieces (written by Vũ Trinh himself). The book is composed of simple short stories of the end of the 18th century and beginning of the 19th century. It is an interesting creative work from the literary angle, and contains useful material about language's evidences for understanding formation and development of one of the most popular literary genres of Vietnam, the genre of a short story.

== Evaluation ==
"Through 45 stories, the author wants to promote morality and express the hidden feelings of a loyal mandarin to the late Le dynasty.", by Valedictorian Vũ Tú

== Sources ==
- Lan Trì kiến văn lục (VHv.1401), Viện nghiên cứu Hán nôm
- Đại Nam liệt truyện, mục Vũ Trinh | Quốc sử quán triều Nguyễn
- Lời giới thiệu về Lan Trì kiến văn lục, bởi Thủ khoa-Nghệ sĩ thị giác Vũ Tú
- Lan Trì kiến văn lục của Vũ Trinh và sự cách tân thể loại, bởi Hoàng Thị Thu Phương | HNUE
