= Vũ Miên =

Vũ Miên 武檰
- Born: 1718; Kinh Bắc, Đại Việt
- Died: 1782 (aged 63–64); Thăng Long, Đại Việt
- Occupation: Royal official
- Parent: Vũ Khuê
- Relatives: Vũ Trinh; Vũ Tú
- Writing career
- Language: Vietnamese, Hán văn
- Period: Revival Lê dynasty
- Genre: Historiography
- Notable works: Đại Việt sử ký tục biên Đại Việt lịch triều đăng khoa lục Tam thiên tự lịch đại văn Quốc âm

Vũ Miên (chữ Hán: 武檰; 1718 - 1782), also known as Hy Nghi tiên sinh (Master Hy Nghi), was an intellectual, official, and historian during the Lê–Trịnh period. Vũ Miên was in 1718 in Thọ Diên village, Xuân Lan commune, Thuận An prefecture, former Kinh Bắc region (now Ngọc Quan village, Lâm Thao commune, Bắc Ninh province), in a noble clan with tradition of studying. Descendant of a prestigious scholarly family originally from Mộ Trạch (Hải Dương). His distant ancestor, Vũ Hồn, passed the Royal Confucian examination during the Tang dynasty (15 years old) and was appointed highest governor of An Nam. He did get highest scores in many Confucian examinations, including Hội nguyên (會元), then finally was awarded the title Tiến sĩ (進士) in 1748 (30 years old).

Renowned for his intelligence from a young age: At 14, he passed the Đầu Xứ examination (top candidate in local exams); At 17, he ranked first in the regional Hương examination and was admitted to the Quốc Tử Giám (Imperial Academy); At 30, he passed the Tiến sĩ Nho học (Doctor of Confucianism) and ranked first in the national Hội examination (in the Mậu Thìn year, Cảnh Hưng reign). A well-known anecdote recounts that during the final Đình examination, his brush suddenly dulled, preventing him from finishing the exam — though he was reportedly on track to be named Trạng nguyên (Top Doctoral Laureate).

He did concurrently hold many high ranking mandarin positions, including: Chancellor and Headmaster of Quốc Tử Giám, Chairman of National History Press... Vũ Miên died in 1782 in Thăng Long (present-day Hanoi).

== Career in Government ==
Vũ Miên held several prestigious positions in the royal court in Thăng Long: Tri Lễ phiên: Head of ceremonial and ritual affairs; Tham tụng: Equivalent to a Minister or Chancellor; Tế tửu Quốc Tử Giám: Rector of the Imperial Academy; Tổng tài Quốc sử quán: Chief editor of the National History Bureau. He was known for his integrity, rarely making errors in official duties and advancing based on merit.

== Contributions to History and Culture ==
Principal compiler of the Đại Việt sử ký tục biên (The Continued Chronicles of Đại Việt), documenting the Lê dynasty from 1676 to 1739, with collaboration from other eminent scholars like Lê Quý Đôn, Ngô Thì Sĩ, and Phạm Nguyễn Du. Editor-in-chief of the Đại Việt lịch triều đăng khoa lục (A Record of Confucian Doctoral Graduates through the Dynasties). Author of several epitaphs and poems in both classical Chinese and vernacular Nôm script, including the work Tam thiên tự lịch đại văn Quốc âm (Three Thousand Characters of Vietnamese Historical Literature).

== Selected writings ==
- 大越史記續編
- 黎朝武蓮溪公北使自述記
- 大越歷朝登科錄

== Evaluation ==
"Both first-class Jinshi and first-class Mandarin, famous celebrity Vũ Miên is the leading exemplary Confucian scholar in the entire history of Vietnam." - by Valedictorian Vũ Tú

== Descendants ==
- Vũ Trinh
- Vũ Tú

== Recognition & Legacy ==
Acknowledged as "one of the most outstanding Confucian scholars in Vietnamese history", excelling in both academic achievement and public service. Revered and worshiped by his hometown residents even during his lifetime; his descendants have continued the family’s scholarly tradition. Many places across Vietnam have named streets after him, including in Hanoi, Bắc Ninh, and Đà Nẵng.

== Sources ==
- Sculpture art in Vietnam, Calitoday News
- 欽定越史通鑑綱目
- 歷朝憲章類誌
- 歷朝雜紀
- 大越歷朝登科錄
- 登科錄搜講
