= Golan Armored Vehicle =

Golan
- Type: Mine-Resistant Ambush Protected Vehicle
- Place of origin: Israel

Production history
- Manufacturer: Rafael Advanced Defense Systems / Protected Vehicles Incorporated
- No. built: 64

Specifications
- Mass: 15 tons
- Length: 5.9 m
- Width: 2.55 m
- Height: 2.35 m
- Crew: 1+10
- Main armament: Remote weapon system
- Engine: Cummins Diesel; 315 HP
- Transmission: Allison
- Suspension: 4x4 wheeled
- Operational range: 600 km

The Golan Wheeled Armored Vehicle (Hebrew: גולן) is a prototype Israeli MRAP made by the Israeli Rafael Advanced Defense Systems jointly with Protected Vehicles Incorporated.

The mission of the Golan is to provide maximum protection to its passengers and crew. The Golan platform may be adapted to serve as an armored personnel carrier, command vehicle, ambulance or intelligence collection vehicle. In the personnel carrier role, it has capacity of up to 10 soldiers.

The V shaped hull and vehicle body has been specifically designed to withstand mines and IED blasts. It is configurable to carry different levels of armor, from light passive armor to heavy reactive armor that can deflect RPGs. When equipped with reactive armor, the vehicle is the only MRAP vehicle able to defeat Explosively Formed Penetrators, the deadliest type of IED.

The US Marine Corps ordered 60 vehicles to be fielded during the Iraq war as Mine Resistant Ambush Protected Category 2 vehicles. It was being considered for large purchases both in the American and Israeli armed forces. The Golan was eliminated from the Marine Corps competition, and most of the vehicles will leave Marine service.

== See also ==
- Wildcat APC
- COMBATGUARD
