= Hong Ha Shipbuilding =

State-owned shipyard in Vietnam

Coordinates: 20°55′49″N 106°33′19″E

Hong Ha Shipbuilding Company
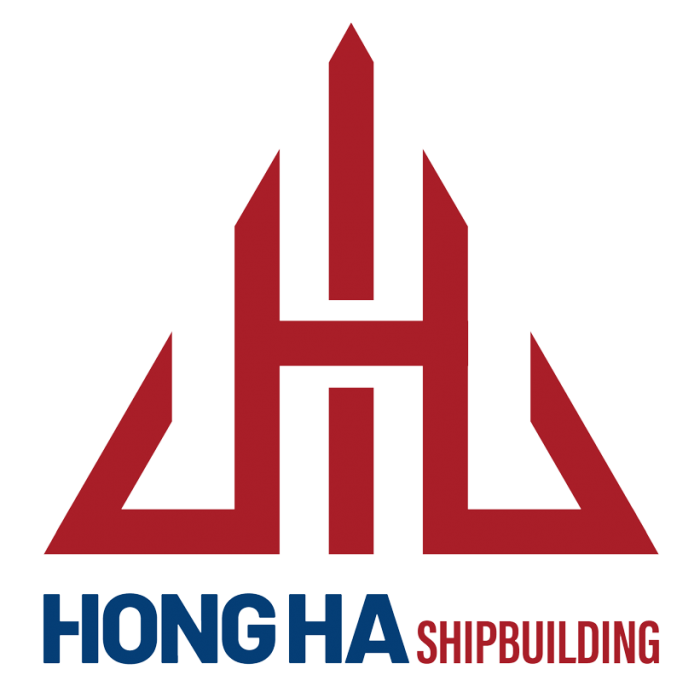
- Trade name: Hong Ha Shipbuilding/Shipyard; Z173 Shipyard
- Native name: Nhà máy Z173; Nhà máy đóng tàu Hồng Hà
- Type: State-owned enterprise
- Industry: Shipbuilding; Arms industry
- Founded: October 30, 1965; 61 years ago
- Headquarters: Lê Thiện, An Dương District, Haiphong, Vietnam
- Area served: Vietnam
- Key people: Nguyen Van Cuong (Director); Senior Colonel Tran The Son (President)
- Owner: Vietnamese Ministry of Defence
- Website: https://honghashipbuilding.com/

The Hong Ha Shipbuilding Company (Vietnamese: Công ty Đóng tàu Hồng Hà, lit. 'Shipbuilding Company of the Red River'), formally the Hong Ha Shipbuilding One Member LLC (Vietnamese: Công Ty TNHH MTV Đóng Tàu Hồng Hà, lit. 'Red River Shipbuilding Co., Ltd'), also recognized by its military designation Z173 Shipyard (Vietnamese: Nhà máy Z173, lit. 'Z173 Factory'), is a Vietnamese state-owned shipyard. It is managed by the Vietnamese Ministry of National Defence.

== History ==
The company was established on October 30, 1965, under the management of the General Department of Defence Industry (VDI) of the Ministry of Defence. It was first known as Ban Ca No, followed by Factory Q173W in 1968. The company changed names in 1972 to Factory A173, followed by Factory 173 in 1983 before it took the name Hong Ha Shipbuilding Company in 1996.

In April 2009, the Vietnamese Ministry of Defense made plans for the creation of the TT-400TP gunboat by purchasing foreign designs to be used in its construction. The first TT-400TP was constructed in 2013. In 2010, Petrolimex contracted Z173 Factory to construct asphalt tankers under Norwegian supervision from the DNV.

On April 30, 2010, the decision was made to change the company's name to the Hong Ha Shipbuilding One Member Co., Ltd. On August 28, 2010, the name Hong Ha Limited Liability Company was changed to Hong Ha Shipbuilding One-Member Limited Liability Company under the GDDI.

In 2015, Z173 Factory was tasked to construct a multi-purpose transport ship for the Vietnam Coast Guard and Navy.

In January 2020, the company announced that it was taking its first export order for the delivery of patrol boats to the Nigerian Navy. The contract was made by Benedict Peters on behalf of Marine Assets And Offshore Equipment Limited. 10 boats were reported to be contracted for delivery.

On September 25, 2020, a delegation led by Deputy Minister Senior Lieutenant General Be Xuan Truong visited Z173 Factory. During his visit, he was briefed on the company's work and economic performance. On October 30, 2020, Z173 Factory celebrated 55 years of achievements with awards bestowed to the company including the Labor Hero in the Doi Moi Period (2000), Hero of the People's Armed Forces (2014), First Class Independence Medal (year 2020), Second Class Independence Medal (2010), First Class Victory Medal (2020) and the Third Class Labor Medal (2016).
