= Mão Điền =

- Ward
- Location within Vietnam
- Coordinates: 21°18′N 106°02′E
- Country: Vietnam
- City: Bắc Ninh
- Time zone: UTC+07:00 (Indochina Time)
- Website: maodien.bacninh.gov.vn

Mão Điền is a ward (phường) in Bắc Ninh city, in northeastern Vietnam. It has a population of just over 9,000.
