= Wildcat APC =

Armoured personnel carrier used in Israel

The Wildcat APC (Armoured personnel carrier) is an MRAP vehicle made by Israel Military Industries. Its chassis is based on the Tatra 4x4 platform.

== See also ==
- Golan Armored Vehicle
- COMBATGUARD
