= RAM MK3 =

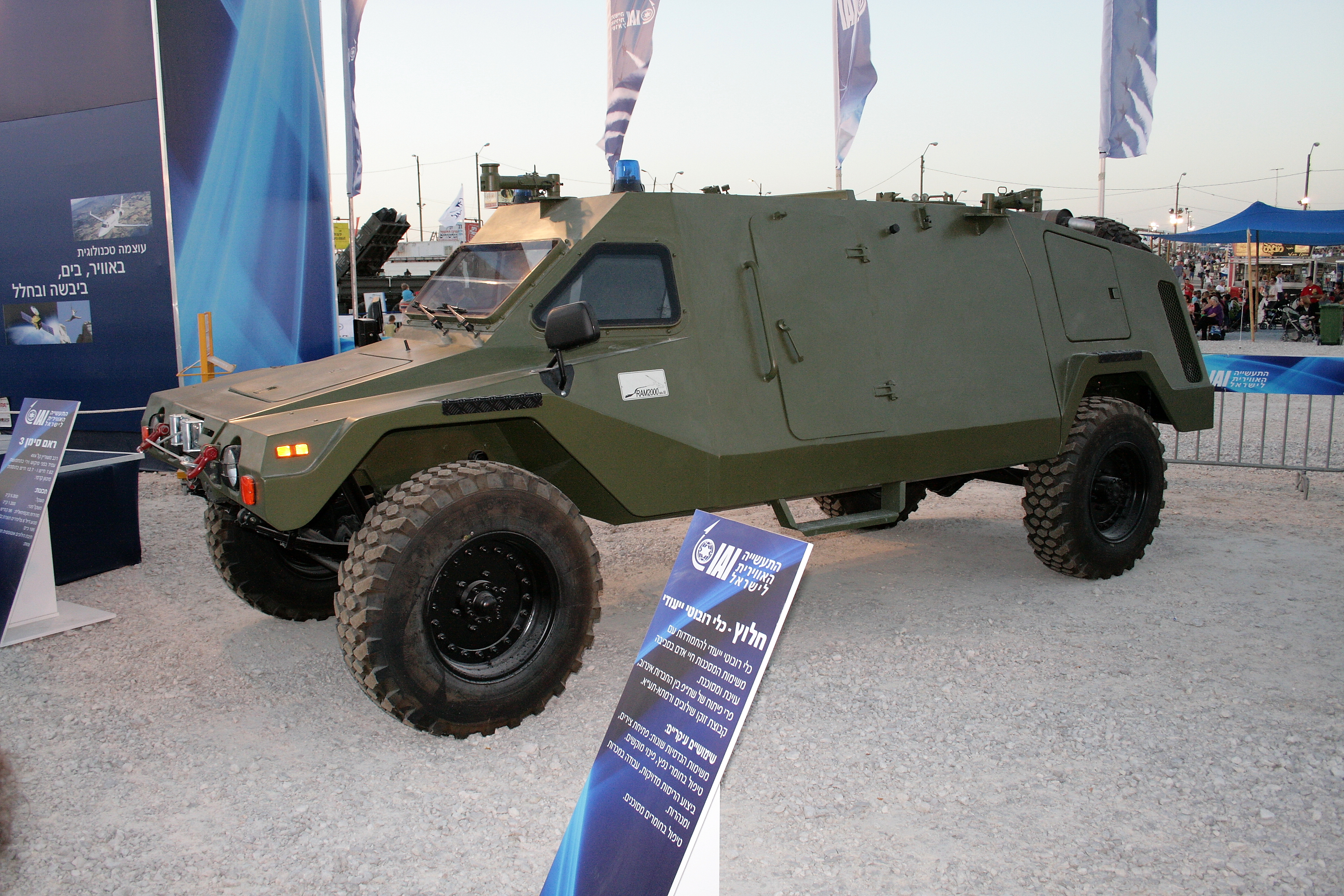
- IAI RAM-2000
- Type: Reconnaissance vehicle
- Place of origin: Israel

Service history
- Used by: See Users

Production history
- Designer: IAI RAMTA

Specifications
- Mass: 5300 kg (empty)
- Length: 5.6 m (18 ft)
- Width: 2.08 m (6 ft 10 in)
- Height: 2.12 m (6 ft 11 in)
- Engine: 6-cylinder turbocharged diesel 185 hp
- Operational range: 800 km (500 mi)
- Maximum speed: 96 km/h (60 mph)

RAM MK3 (RAM 2000) is a light armored vehicle designed by IAI RAMTA. It is based on a 4×4 wheeled monocoque chassis.

== History ==
The vehicle was also listed for sale under Mahindra Defense Systems with plans to make the RAM MK3 under license for a future Indian military contract.

== Operational history ==
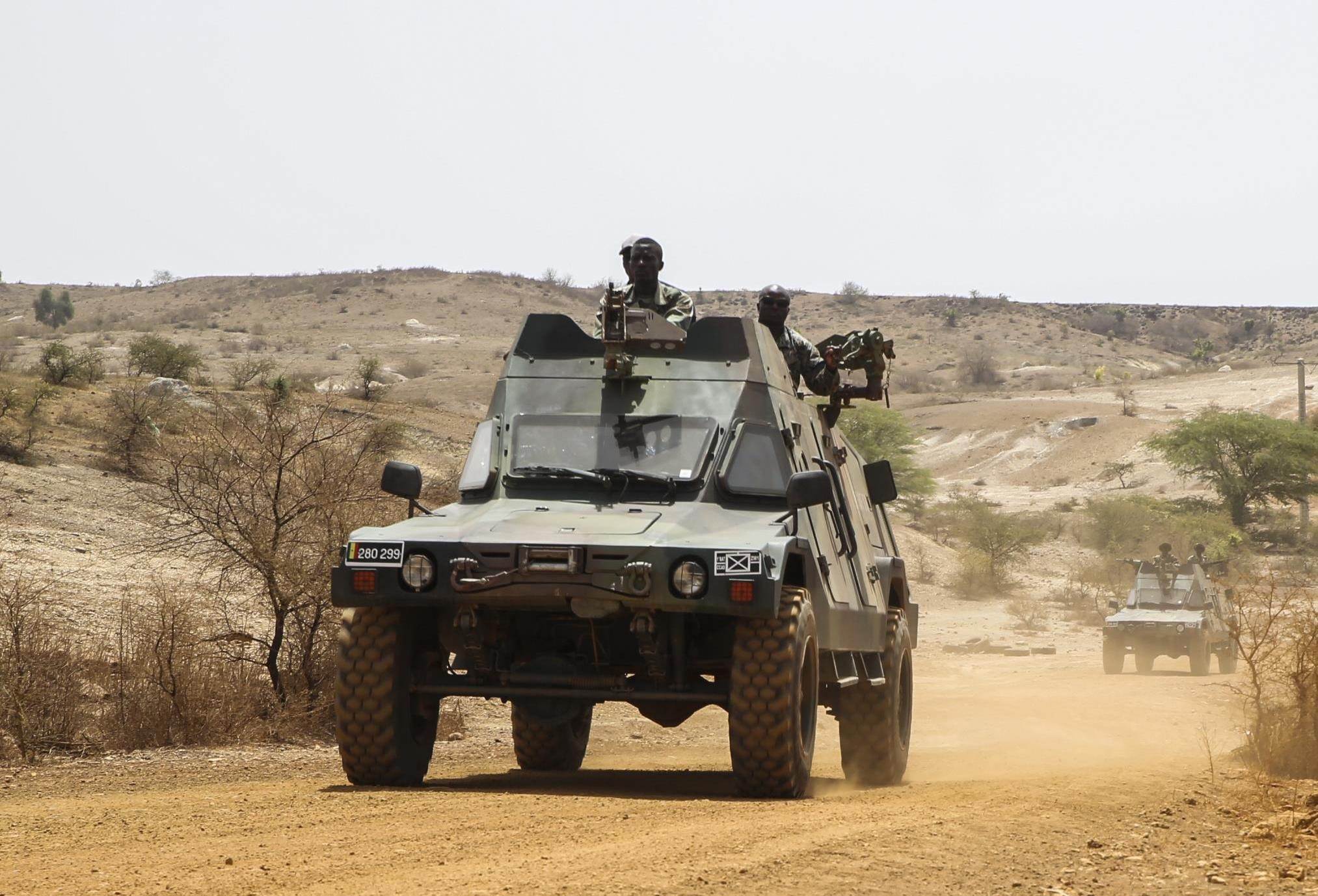
RAM Mk3s of the 1er bataillon d'infanterie, Senegalese Army, before its deployment to Mali in 2017.

The RAM Mk 3 was used in Chadian and Senegalese military operations. Chadian RAM Mk3s were used during the Chadian Civil War that ended in 2010 and during the 2013 Chadian intervention in Mali War.

Senegalese RAM Mk3s were deployed with UNOCI in Ivory Coast.

== Variants ==
=== Anti-Tank ===
The RAM Mk3 AT is equipped with 4-8 LAHAT laser guided anti-tank missiles. Unlike other armored vehicles, which have the engine at the front or under the protected cabin, RAM places the entire power-pack – engine, automatic transmission and transfer cases at the rear.

== Users ==
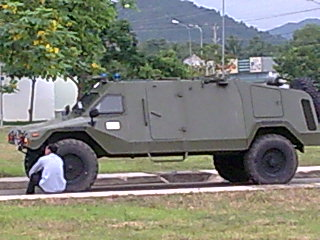
A RAM 2000 in Vietnamese police service.

- Cameroon: 5 delivered in 2008 for the presidential guard
- Chad: ~42 delivered in 2006-2008
- Botswana
- Democratic Republic of the Congo: 2
- Gabon: 7
- Lesotho: 6 delivered in 2006
- Malawi: 8
- Morocco
- Peru: 7 delivered for Peruvian Naval Infantry in 2016.
- Senegal: 55, in service with Army and Gendarmerie
- Vietnam: 150 vehicles ordered in 2006 and delivered in 2009; for usage by the Vietnam People's Public Security (especially the Mobile Police Command)

== See also ==
- RBY MK 1
