= Đông Cứu =

- Rural commune
- Interactive map of Đông Cứu
- Country: Vietnam
- City: Bắc Ninh
- Time zone: UTC+07:00 (Indochina Time)
- Website: dongcuu.bacninh.gov.vn

Đông Cứu is a rural commune (xã) of Bắc Ninh, Vietnam.
