= Lương Tài =

- Ward
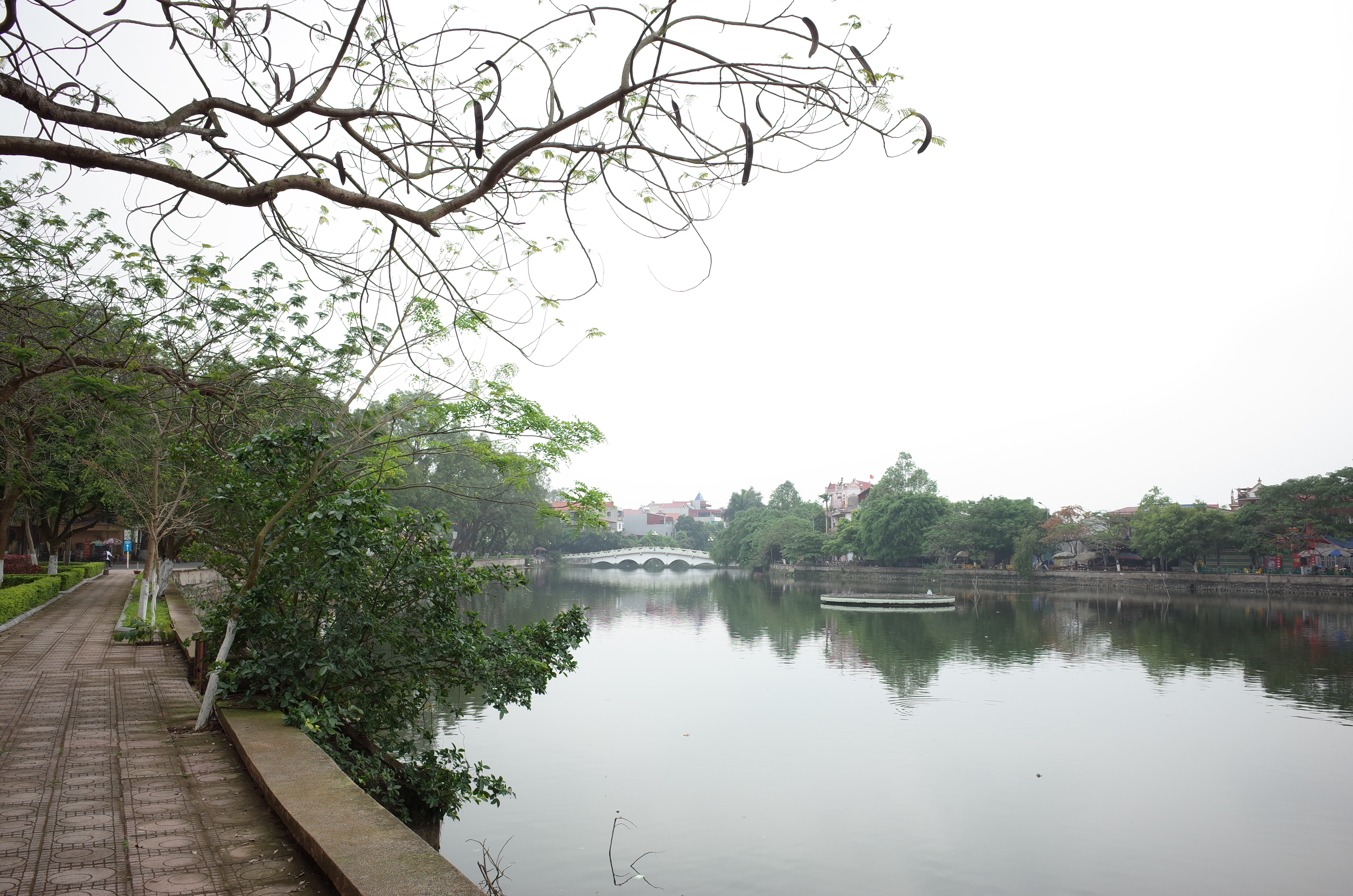
- Thứa Lake
- Interactive map of Lương Tài
- Coordinates: 21.017699°N 106.201595°E
- Country: Vietnam
- Region: Red River Delta
- City: Bắc Ninh
- Administrative divisions: 14 hamlets
- Established: 20 September 2026
- Seat: Lý Thái Tổ Street; Nguyễn Văn Cừ Street

Government
  - Party Committee Secretary: Nguyễn Văn Long
  - Chairman of the People's Committee: Phùng Đức Luân
  - Chairman of the People's Council: Nguyễn Văn Long
  - Chairman of the Vietnam Fatherland Front Committee: Vũ Thị Nhung

Area
  - Total: 24.69 km^{2} (9.53 sq mi)

Population (2025)
  - Total: 32,955
  - Density: 1,334/km^{2} (3,460/sq mi)
- Website: luongtai.bacninh.gov.vn

Lương Tài is a ward (phường) of Bắc Ninh city, Vietnam. It is one of the 99 new wards, communes and special zones of the province following the reorganization in 2025.

== Geography ==
Lương Tài ward borders the following administrative divisions:

- To the east, Trung Kênh commune.
- To the west, Lâm Thao commune.
- To the south, Trung Chính commune.
- To the north, Gia Bình and Nhân Thắng wards.

Lương Tài ward covers an area of 24.69 km² and has a population of 32,955 people, giving it a population density of approximately 1,334 people per km².

== History ==
The Standing Committee of the National Assembly issued Resolution No. 1658/NQ-UBTVQH15 on the arrangement of commune-level administrative units in Bắc Ninh Province in 2025 (the resolution took effect on 16 June 2025). Accordingly, the entire natural area and population of Thứa township and the communes of Phú Hòa and Tân Lãng (Lương Tài District) were merged to form a new commune named Lương Tài.

The name Lương Tài commune was inherited from the name of Lương Tài district, Bắc Ninh province.

On 4 August 2026, the Standing Committee of the National Assembly promulgated Resolution No. 388/NQ-UBTVQH16 on the establishment of wards in Bắc Ninh province, which took effect on 20 September 2026. Under the resolution, Lương Tài ward was established with the entire area and population of Lương Tài commune.

On 24 August 2026, the National Assembly promulgated Resolution No. 39/2026/QH16 on the establishment of Bắc Ninh city from the entire area and population of Bắc Ninh province. The resolution took effect on 20 September 2026. As a result, Lương Tài ward became part of Bắc Ninh city.
