= List of equipment of the Vietnam People's Ground Forces =

During the First Indochina War (1946–1954), Vietnam War (1955–1975), Cambodian–Vietnamese War (1977–1989), Sino-Vietnamese War (1979) and the Sino-Vietnamese conflicts 1979– 1991 (1979–1991), the Vietnam People's Ground Force relied almost entirely on Soviet-derived weapons and equipment systems. With the end of the Cold War in 1992 Soviet military equipment subsidies ended and Vietnam began the use of hard currency and barter to buy weapons and equipment.

Vietnam prioritizes economic development and growth while maintaining defense spending. The government does not conduct procurement phases or major upgrades of weapons. From the end of the 1990s the Government of Vietnam has announced the acquisition of a number of strategic systems equipped with modern weapons. Accordingly, Vietnam has been slow to develop naval and air forces to control shallow waters and its exclusive economic zone (EEZ). Currently most defense procurement programs focus on remedying this priority. For example, Vietnam has purchased a number of combat aircraft and warships with the capability to operate in high seas. Vietnam also plans to develop its defense industry, with priority placed on the Navy, combined with assistance from its former communist allies; as well as India, and Japan.

Since 2015, Vietnam has begun exploring purchases of U.S. and European weapons while facing numerous political, historical, and financial barriers, as they cannot continue to rely on Soviet and Chinese weapons especially due to the increasing tensions in the South China Sea dispute.

== Personal equipment ==
=== Combat helmets ===
Image	Model	Type	Origin	Details
	Modular Integrated Communications Helmet	Combat Helmet	United States; Vietnam	Vietnamese copy. Used by People's Army of Vietnam Special Forces, police, and infantry soldiers. Manufactured locally at Factory Z176.
	High Cut Helmet	Combat Helmet	United States; Vietnam	Vietnamese copy. Used by People's Army of Vietnam Special Forces, police, and future infantry soldiers. Manufactured locally at Factory Z176.
	PASGT Helmet	Combat Helmet	United States; Vietnam; Israel	Limited use with Special Forces, Border Guards, and the Navy. They are gradually replacing older helmets in all branches of the Army. Most helmets are a Vietnamese-made version of the PASGT Helmet. Earlier models were imported from Israel.
	Type A2 Helmet	Combat helmet	Vietnam	The PAVN's standard issue bump shell is a hard plastic replica of the PASGT helmets. It is used for training exercises and combat drill.
	Vietnamese pith helmet	Helmet	Vietnam	Traditional standard issue hard hat, used as the army's utility and barracks cover. Commonly worn by enlisted members with their dress uniforms and during light training.
	SSh-68	Combat Helmet	Soviet Union	Limited use.
	SSh-40	Combat Helmet	Soviet Union	Limited use.
	M1 Helmet	Combat Helmet	United States	Limited use.

=== Gas mask ===
Image	Model	Type	Origin	Details
	MV-5	Gas mask	Vietnam	Used by People's Army of Vietnam Special Forces, police, and infantry soldiers. Manufactured locally at Factory X61.

=== Optronic Device & Observation System ===
Image	Model	Type	Origin	Details
	Safran Vectronix Vector 21	Multifunctional optronic device	France; Switzerland	Being used by artillery reconnaissance units.
	Safran Vectronix JIM LR	Multifunctional optronic device	France; Switzerland	Being used by artillery reconnaissance units.
	Leica Geosystems	Total station	Switzerland	TS02 and TS06 series are being used by artillery reconnaissance units.

=== Night-vision devices ===
Image	Model	Type	Origin	Details
OĐ2M is slightly to the right, while the OĐ1M is slightly to the left	OĐ2M OĐ1M	Night-vision device	Vietnam	Used by People's Army of Vietnam Special Forces.
	AN/PVS-14	Night-vision device	US	Used by People's Army of Vietnam Special Forces.
	AN/PVS-7	Night-vision device	US; Vietnam	Used by People's Army of Vietnam Special Forces. Produced under name KNĐ-2MAT

=== Communication equipment ===
Image	Model	Type	Origin	Details
	VRH-911	Personal radio	Vietnam	Squads-issued personal radios operate in UHF band. Designed and produced by Viettel.

=== Body armor ===
Image	Model	Type	Origin	Details
	K23 load bearing vest	Body armor	Vietnam	Modern battle uniform for standard Vietnamese infantry featuring the capacity to carry 3 magazines, 4 hand grenades, and 6 rounds of 40mm grenade launcher ammunition along with personal radio and bayonet. It is integrated with the MOLLE system and can accommodate 4 armor plates, up to 2 hard plates and 2 soft plates. Manufactured at the Z176 factory.
	Marom Dolphin Fusion System	Body armor	Israel	Used by People's Army of Vietnam Special Forces.

=== Camouflage patterns ===
Image	Model	Type	Origin	Details
	K-07 Woodland	Camouflage pattern	Vietnam	Replaced as the standard camo for ground forces by the K-17 Woodland. There are multiple variants of this Woodland camo in terms of slight differences in colors. Commonly used on training fatigues.
	K-17 Woodland	Camouflage pattern	Vietnam	Former standard-issue camouflage for ground forces. Similar coloration to the K-07, there are also multiple variants for the other branches of the military. Replaced by the K-20 and observed limited usage since 2020s.
	K-17 Multi-Terrain	Camouflage pattern	Vietnam	Used by Vietnamese forces deployed in arid and desert environment. Based on Multicam color schemes. Seen with Vietnamese troops undergoing peacekeeping missions in South Sudan with the United Nations.
	K20 Pattern K21 Field Uniform	Camouflage pattern	Vietnam	Standard issue as of 2021, the PAVN's K20 camouflage pattern was developed with more subdued coloration. The new uniform will consist of 5 different variants for each branches of service: Ground Forces, Border Guard, Air Defence - Air Force, Navy and Coast Guard.
	Modified Duck Hunter Pattern	Camouflage pattern	Vietnam	Used by People's Army of Vietnam Special Forces. Replaced by the Ground Forces-colored K20 camouflage.
"M81" U.S. woodland camouflage pattern swatch	U.S. Woodland	Camouflage pattern	United States	Limited use. Most commonly seen on old vests mix-matched with K07 uniform or K20
	Ghillie suit	Ghillie suit	Vietnam	Used by the snipers and People's Army of Vietnam Special Forces, manufactured locally. Been introduced in International Army Games's exhibition.

== Infantry weapons ==
=== Weapons attachments ===
Image	Model	Type	Origin	Details
Scopes
	ITL MARS	Red dot sight	Israel	Mounted on Uzi, AKM-1, IWI Tavor.
	Meprolight M21 RDS-GL02	Red dot sight	IsraelVietnam	Mounted on Uzi, AKM-1, IWI Tavor, STV Rifles and IWI ACE.
	Aimpoint PRO	Red dot sight	United States	Mounted on STV Rifles.
	Aimpoint CompM4	Red dot sight	United States	Mounted on AKM-1, limited use.
	KBN-SN	Red dot sight	Vietnam	Mounted on SN-19 and SN7N. Manufactured locally at Vietnam Defense Industry (VDI).
	KBN-M1	Red dot sight	Vietnam	Mounted on STV-380. Manufactured locally at Vietnam Defense Industry (VDI).
	Advanced Combat Optical Gunsight	Telescopic sight	United States	Mounted on Special Operations Assault Rifle, Tara TM4 rifle. Limited uses within Military Marksman Demonstration Team.
Barrel
	CornerShot	Weapon accessory	Israel Vietnam	Used by the People's Army of Vietnam Special Forces and Mobile Police Force. There is a domestic copy.
Under Barrel
	SPL-40	Grenade launcher	Vietnam	Standard issue grenade launcher accompanying the STV-380 rifles.
	M203	Grenade launcher	United States; Vietnam	Replaces the trigger for a lever. Mounts on the Galil ACE 32, STL-1A, M18, M16A2 and TAR-21. Manufactured locally as T-40 at the Z111 Factory.
Bayonet
	6Ch4	Bayonet	Soviet Union	Mount on AK-47 and AKM.
	M7 bayonet	Bayonet	United States	Mount on STV rifle.

=== Pistols ===
Image	Model	Type	Variant	Caliber	Origin	Details
	IWI Jericho 941	Semi-automatic pistol		9×19mm Parabellum	Israel; Vietnam	Limited use in the army and police, being manufactured to slowly replace the K54 and K14VN pistols. Manufactured locally at the Z111 Factory.
	Glock	Semi-automatic pistol	Glock 19 Glock 34 SN-19 SN19-T SN7VN-M24	9×19mm Parabellum 7.62×25mm Tokarev(SN7VN M24)	Austria; Vietnam	SN-19 and SN19-T are domestic copies. Manufactured locally by Vietnam Defense Industry (VDI) and Z111 Factory respectively. Derivative of Glock with steel frame, chambered in 7.62×25mm. Can be attached with silencer and scope. Manufactured locally at Z111 Factory.
	Makarov pistol	Semi-automatic pistol	Type 59 K59 (SN9)	9×18mm Makarov	Soviet Union China Vietnam	Used by police officers. Limited use in the army. Manufactured locally as the K59 (SN9) by Vietnam Defense Industry (VDI).
	CZ-82	Semi-automatic pistol		9×18mm Makarov	Czechoslovak Socialist Republic	Used by police officers. Limited use in the army.
	TT-33	Semi-automatic pistol	Type 54/K54 K14 SN7M SN7TD SN7N K54n	7.62×25mm Tokarev	Soviet Union China Vietnam	Standard issue service pistol. Manufactured locally as the K54 (Type 54 Chinese TT-33 copy). SN7M, SN7TD, and SN7N are modernized TT variants: SN7M is basic modernization, SN7TD has integrated silencer, SN7N has intrinsic sight. All manufactured locally by Vietnam Defense Industry (VDI). K54n variants issued to special reconnaissance force.
	Type 64	Semi-automatic pistol with integrated suppressor		7.65×17mm rimless ball	China	Used by Vietnam's Special Force.

=== Submachine guns ===
Image	Model	Type	Variant	Caliber	Origin	Details
	PP-19 Bizon	Submachine gun	SN9P SN-7P	9×19mm Parabellum 7.62×25mm Tokarev	Russia; Vietnam	The locally produced version features a Galil-style stock and is chambered in 9×19mm Parabellum. Manufactured locally as the SN9P at the Z111 Factory. The SN-7P is chambered in 7.62×25mm and produced by Vietnam Defense Industry (VDI). Not adopted.
	Uzi Pro	Submachine gun		9×19mm Parabellum	Israel; Vietnam	Used by People's Army of Vietnam Special Forces and Naval Special Operation Force. Manufactured locally at the Z111 Factory.
	Micro Uzi	Submachine gun	TL-K12	9×19mm Parabellum	Israel; Vietnam	Used by People's Army of Vietnam Special Forces. Manufactured locally at the Z111 Factory. TL-K12 is the domestic copy with slight changes. Manufactured locally by Vietnam Defense Industry (VDI).
	CZ Scorpion Evo 3	Submachine gun		9×19mm Parabellum	Czech Republic	Used by the Military Marksman Demonstration Team.

=== Assault rifles ===
Image	Model	Type	Variant	Caliber	Origin	Details
STV3801	STV	Assault rifle	STV-215 STV-380 STV-022	7.62×39mm	Vietnam	Standard issue rifle. The STV-215 is the carbine version of the STV-380 with a 215 mm barrel. Developed and manufactured at the Z111 Factory. Can attach various accessories including the KBN-M1 red-dot sight. A PDW variant without stock, equipped with a vertical grip, Picatinny rails around the barrel, and a flashlight attachment. Used by military police and guard units. Manufactured locally at Z111 Factory.
	Galil ACE	Assault rifle	Galil ACE 31 Galil ACE 32	7.62×39mm	Israel; Vietnam	Replaced by the domestically manufactured STV-215/STV-380. Most were transferred to Laos and are now rarely seen in Vietnamese service. Manufactured locally at the Z111 Factory.
	AKM	Assault rifle	AKMS AKM-1 AKn	7.62×39mm	Soviet Union; Vietnam	Older models have been refurbished into domestic AKM-1/AKn versions. Replaced by the STV-215/STV-380 as the standard issue. Manufactured locally with updated components.
	Type 56	Assault rifle		7.62×39mm	China; Vietnam	Limited use. Refurbished to AKn-equivalent and replaced by the STV-215/STV-380.
	AK-47	Assault rifle	STL-A1	7.62×39mm	Soviet Union; Vietnam	
	IWI Tavor TAR-21	Assault rifle	TAR-21 GTAR-21	5.56×45mm NATO	Israel	Used by People's Army of Vietnam Special Forces and Naval Infantry.
	M16 rifle	Assault rifle	M16A1 M16A2 CAR-15	5.56×45mm NATO	United States; Vietnam	M16A1 and XM16E1 are used by Militia Forces in southern provinces. Upgraded and manufactured locally as M16A2VN based on M16A1 and M18 with new stock and Picatinny rail. M16A2 used by Coast Guard in small numbers. Used by People's Army of Vietnam Special Forces, Naval Infantry, and Vietnam Coast Guard. Converted locally as M18 at the Z111 Factory.
	CZ 805 BREN	Assault rifle	CZ 805 BREN A1 CZ 805 BREN A2	5.56×45mm NATO	Czech Republic	Used by the Military Marksman Demonstration Team.
	Special Operations Assault Rifle	Assault rifle		5.56×45mm NATO	United States	Used by the Military Marksman Demonstration Team.
	FN FNC	Assault rifle		5.56×45mm NATO	Belgium	Used by the Military Marksman Demonstration Team.
	Tara TM4	Assault rifle		5.56×45mm NATO	Montenegro	Used by the Military Marksman Demonstration Team.

=== Shotguns ===
Image	Model	Type	Variant	Caliber	Origin	Details
	Remington Model 870	Shotgun		12 Gauge	United States	
	Armsel Striker	Combat shotgun		12 Gauge	South Africa	Limited use.

=== Machine guns ===
Image	Model	Type	Variant	Caliber	Origin	Details
	RPD	Light machine gun	RPD-44 STrL-D	7.62×39mm	Soviet Union; Vietnam	Standard issue squad-level machine gun, modernized with Picatinny and side accessory rails. Manufactured locally at Z111 Factory.
	RPK	Light machine gun		7.62×39mm	Soviet Union; Vietnam	Standard issue squad-level machine gun. Manufactured locally.
	PKM	General-purpose machine gun	PKT PKM PKMS ĐL7N	7.62×54mmR	Soviet Union; Vietnam	Standard issue machine gun for motorized infantry squads and company-level forces. Manufactured locally by Vietnam Defense Industry (VDI). ĐL7N is the unlicensed copy manufactured by the Z111 Factory.
	Kord	Heavy machine gun	6P49	12.7×108mm	Russia	Used as a tank-mounted machine gun on T-90.
	NSV	Heavy machine gun		12.7×108mm	Soviet Union; Vietnam	Standard issue tank-mounted machine gun, also used by air defense battalions of infantry divisions. Manufactured locally at Z111 Factory. Replacing the DShK.
	DShK	Heavy machine gun	DShK-38 DShK 38/46 Type 54	12.7×108mm	Soviet Union	Equipped for air defense battalions of infantry divisions. Mounted on T-55 tanks. Currently being phased out by the NSV.
	KPV	Heavy machine gun		14.5×114mm	Soviet Union	Mounted on armored vehicles or used as an anti-aircraft weapon.
	IWI Negev	Light machine gun	STrL-5.56 STrL-7.62	5.56×45mm NATO 7.62×39mm	Israel; Vietnam	STrL-5.56 is an exact domestic copy with a PKM handle. Used by Naval Infantry. Manufactured locally at Z111 Factory. Another version, STrL-7.62, is chambered in 7.62×39mm with buffer stock, PKM handle, Picatinny rail, and quick-change fluted barrel.
	FN Minimi Mk3	Light machine gun		5.56×45mm NATO	Belgium	Limited use by People's Army of Vietnam Special Forces, Vietnam People's Navy, and Military Marksman Demonstration Team.
	FN MAG	General-purpose machine gun		7.62×51mm NATO	Belgium	Limited use by Military Marksman and Demonstration Team.

=== Sniper rifles ===
Image	Model	Type	Variant	Caliber	Origin	Details
	IWI Galatz	Sniper rifle	SBT-7.62VN	7.62×51mm NATO	Israel; Vietnam	Used by People's Army of Vietnam Special Forces and Naval Infantry. Manufactured locally at the Z111 Factory under the name SBT-7.62VN with free-float M-LOK handguard and adjustable stock similar to the T-5000.
	Dragunov SVD	Designated marksman rifle	SBT-7.62M1	7.62×54mmR	Soviet Union; Vietnam	Used by Naval Special Operation Force and Naval Infantry. Manufactured locally at the Z111 Factory. SBT-7.62M1 is the modernized variant.
	OSV-96	Anti-materiel rifle	SBT12M1	12.7×108mm	Russia; Vietnam	
	KSVK	Anti-materiel rifle	SBT12 M1	12.7×108mm	Russia; Vietnam	Used by People's Army of Vietnam Special Forces. Manufactured locally at the Z111 and Z199 Factory as the SBT12M1 to suit local conditions. Can be equipped with the indigenously made N12 optical sight (10× magnification).
	Brügger & Thomet APR	Sniper rifle	APR308	7.62×51mm NATO.308 Winchester	Switzerland	A small number are used by special reconnaissance forces of the General Department of Defence Intelligence.
	WKW Wilk	Anti-materiel rifle		.50 BMG	Poland	More than 50 examples were bought.
	ORSIS T-5000	Sniper rifle	SBT-7,62M2	.308 Win	Russia; Vietnam	The SBT-7,62M2 is a Vietnamese clone of the T-5000, which was revealed in 2024.

=== Mortars ===
Image	Model	Type	Variant	Caliber	Origin	Details
	STA-50 (Fly-K)	Light mortar		50mm Mortar	Vietnam	Silenced mortar, inspired by Belgian Fly-K design. Manufactured locally at Z117 Factory. Used by People's Army of Vietnam Special Forces.
	M2 mortar	Infantry mortar	M2 Type 31 Type 63.	60mm Mortar	United States	Indirect fire support weapons assigned to the fire support platoon of the infantry company.
	SC60TX	Mortar		60mm Mortar	Vietnam	Produced locally at Z125 Factory, weight over 32 kg with a 1,200mm barrel and has max range of 6 km.
	82-PM-41	Mortar	82-PM-41 Type 67 Type 53	82mm Mortar	Soviet Union	
	SC100TX	Mortar		100mm Mortar	Vietnam	Produced by Z125 Factory based on Chinese Type 71 mortar. Equipped within 100mm mortar battalions of infantry divisions, typically transported by hand or vehicles. Splits into three parts (barrel, bipod, baseplate), each over 20 kg. Operated by a 4–5 man crew; fires 8 kg shells (HE, smoke, illumination).

=== Grenade launchers ===
Image	Model	Type	Variant	Caliber	Origin	Details
	AGS-30	Automatic grenade launcher	SPL-30	30×29mm Grenade	Russia; Vietnam	Manufactured locally at Z111 Factory as the SPL-30 (unlicensed copy). 29-round capacity.
	AGS-17	Automatic grenade launcher	SPL-17	30×29mm Grenade	Soviet Union; Vietnam	Standard issue, assigned to the fire support platoon of the infantry company. Manufactured locally under license at Z125 Factory as the SPL-17.
	Milkor MGL	Grenade launcher	MGL-VN1 (SPL-6)	40×46mm Grenade	South Africa; Vietnam	Used by People's Army of Vietnam Special Forces. Manufactured locally by Vietnam Defense Industry (VDI) as the MGL-VN1 (industry name SPL40L). 6-round capacity.
	M79	Grenade launcher	M79-VN	40×46mm Grenade	United States; Vietnam	Standard issue squad-level grenade launcher. Manufactured locally at Z125 Factory as the M79-VN (industry name SPL40). Currently replaced by OPL-40.

=== Rocket-propelled Grenade (RPG) / Anti-armor weapon ===
Image	Model	Type	Variant	Caliber	Origin	Details
Rocket-propelled Grenade (RPG)
	RPG-7V	Rocket-propelled grenade	RPG7V-VN (SCT-7) SCT-7X	40mm HEAT	Soviet Union; Vietnam	Standard squad-level anti-tank weapon (codename B-41) with 2 launcher and 16 rocket equipped per squad, each launcher standardly attached with dometic version of PGO-7 sight, can be equipped with indigenous KNND-SCT7 day-night sight. Ammunition produced at Factories Z144 and Z131 (cost ~ $280/rocket), while the launcher produced by Z125 Factory.
	M72 LAW	Anti-tank weapon		66mm HEAT	United States	Modified to fire incendiary rounds; used by the Chemical Corps.
	RPO-A Shmel	Thermobaric rocket-propelled		93mm FAE	Russia; Vietnam	For chemical forces only. Manufactured locally at Factory Z117 and Z115.
	RPG-29	Rocket-propelled grenade	SCT-29	105mm HEAT	Soviet Union; Vietnam	Anti-tank weapon assigned to fire support platoons. Manufactured locally as SCT-29 at Factories Z117, Z125, and Z129. Also known as SCT-105 or SCT-105M1. Launcher can be equipped with KNN-SCT105M1 day sight.
	RPG-30	Rocket-propelled grenade	THCT-105TM2	105mm HEAT	Russia; Vietnam	Manufactured locally at Factory Z125 as THCT-105TM2. Being produced in batch 0 before entering mass-produced.
Anti-tank Guided Missile (ATGM)
	9K111 Fagot (AT-4 Spigot)	Wire-guided SACLOS missile		120mm HEAT	Soviet Union; Vietnam	Locally manufactures an upgraded 9P135 launcher. Launcher includes day/night sight, laser rangefinder, and remote control capabilities.
	9M14 Malyutka (AT-3 Sagger)	Wire-guided SACLOS missile	9M14P1-2F 9M14P1-2T CTVN-18	125mm HEAT	Soviet Union; Vietnam	Manufactured locally under license from Serbia with improved SACLOS guidance. Domestic copy known as the CTVN-18, capable of penetrating 750–800 mm of RHA (9M14P1-2T can penetrate 1,000 mm of RHA).
	9M113 Konkurs (AT-5 Spandre)	Wire-guided SACLOS missile		135mm HEAT	Soviet Union; Vietnam	Upgraded 9P135M launcher also used for the 9M133 Konkurs. The Center for Precision Mechanical Technology can develop critical parts for next-gen anti-tank missiles.
Recoilless Rifle
	SPG-9	Anti-tank recoilless rifle	SPG-9-T2	73mm HEAT	Soviet Union; Vietnam	Anti-tank weapon assigned to firing platoon of infantry companies. Manufactured locally as SPG-9-T2 at Z125 Factory by Vietnam Defense Industry (VDI).
	B-10	Anti-tank recoilless rifle	B10VN	82mm HEAT	Soviet Union; Vietnam	Manufactured locally as DKZ82-B10 VN or B10VN. Similar to Type 65 recoilless rifle.

=== Portable anti-drone weapons ===
Image	Model	Type	Variant	Origin	Details
	CA-18GL	Portable Anti-drone Weapon		Vietnam	CA-18GL flycam suppression device creates an "artificial no-fly zone" by spoofing GPS signals, positioning, and navigation. Researched and produced by the Institute of System Integration.

== Munition ==
=== Land mines ===
Image	Model	Type	Variant	Origin	Details
	MON-100	Anti-personal mine	MON-100 MĐH-10	Soviet Union; Vietnam	It can be mounted on racks holding 2–3 mines and has also proven highly effective against obstacles and fortifications.
	M18A1 Claymore	Anti-personal mine	M18A1 MĐH-C40	United States; Vietnam	Large number were captured after Vietnam War. Domestically copied under the name MĐH-C40.
	TM-57	Anti-tank mine		Soviet Union	

=== Breaching charge ===
Image	Model	Type	Variant	Origin	Details
	Bangalore torpedo	Bangalore torpedo		Vietnam	
	FMV-B1	Mine-clearing line charge	FMV-B1 FMV-T2	Vietnam	Obstacle-breaching weapon for barbed wire, sensors, and minefields; with the range of 200–260m and carry 700 kg of explosives. A larger version used to breach openings for tanks. Its engine provides double thrust, and carry 960 kg of explosive.

=== Loitering munitions ===
Image	Model	Type	Variant	Origin	Details
	BXL.01	Loitering munition		Vietnam	Appearance resembles ZALA Lancet loitering munition. Specs: Range: 10 km; Endurance: 10 minutes; Speed: ≤ 100 – 120 km/h (cruising), ≤ 150 km/h (attack); Operational altitude (AGL): 150 – 500 m; Max altitude (AMSL): 1 km; Max take-off weight: 10 kg; Warhead weight: 1.2 kg; CEP: ≤ 3 m; Control mode: Automatic, manual; Penetration: ≤ 250 mm; Production year: 2024; Operational features: Automatic search, identify, lock targets, uses magnetic sensors; Produced at Factory Z131.
	UAV-QXL.01	Loitering munition		Vietnam	Quadcopter loitering munition. Specs: Range: 10 km; Endurance: 10 minutes; Speed: ≤ 60 – 80 km/h (cruising), ≤ 100 km/h (attack); Operational altitude (AGL): 150 – 500 m; Max altitude (AMSL): 1 km; Max take-off weight: 8 kg; Warhead weight: 1.2 kg; CEP: ≤ 2 m; Control mode: Automatic, manual; Penetration: ≤ 250 mm; Production year: 2024; Produced at Factory Z131.
	VU-C2	Loitering munition		Vietnam	
	Spike Firefly	Loitering munition		Israel; Vietnam	Manufactured domestically

== Armoured Fighting Vehicle (AFV) ==
=== Tanks ===
Image	Model	Type	Variant	Quantity	Origin	Details
	T-90	Main battle tank	T-90S	64	Russia	
Palacio_de_la_Reunificación,_Ciudad_Ho_Chi_Minh,_Vietnam,_2013-08-14,_DD_04	T-54/55	Main battle tank	T-54/55 Type 59 T-54B mod	750 350 100	Soviet Union China Soviet Union	See T-54/T-55 operators and variants § Vietnam. According to state media, at least 300 tanks were upgraded in 2019-2024 period
	T-62	Main battle tank		70	Soviet Union	
	Type 63	Amphibious Light tank		320	China	
	PT-76	Amphibious Light tank		300	Soviet Union	
	T-34	Medium tank		45	Soviet Union	Used for training and coastal defense purposes.

=== Infantry fighting vehicles (IFV) ===
Image	Model	Type	Variant	Quantity	Origin	Details
	BMP-1	Infantry fighting vehicle		300	Soviet Union	
	BMP-2	Infantry fighting vehicle		300	Soviet Union	
	XCB-01	Infantry fighting vehicle		Unknown	Vietnam	

=== Armored personnel carriers (APC) ===
Image	Model	Type	Variant	Quantity	Origin	Details
Armored Personnel Carrier (Wheeled)
	GAZ-59037A	Wheeled armoured personnel carrier		Unknown	Russia	Used in natural disaster rescue and response missions.
	BTR-40	Wheeled armoured personnel carrier		1,100	Soviet Union	
	BTR-60	Wheeled armoured personnel carrier		1,100	Soviet Union	
	BTR-152	Wheeled armoured personnel carrier		1,100	Soviet Union	Being upgraded with a new diesel engine. One is converted to an armoured ambulance to support the field hospital in Bentiu, South Sudan, as part of the UN peacekeeping mission in South Sudan.
	XTC-02	Wheeled armoured personnel carrier		(+9)	Vietnam	
Armored Personnel Carrier (Tracked)
	MT-LB	Armoured personnel carrier		Unknown	Soviet Union	Was seen used by artillery troops preparing for the 2020 International Army Games.
	M113	Armoured personnel carrier		200	United States	
	Type 63	Armoured personnel carrier		80	China	

=== Armored cars ===
Image	Model	Type	Variant	Quantity	Origin	Details
	Cadillac V-100	Armoured scout car		Unknown	United States	Upgraded by the Military Mechanical Engineering Institute with assistance from Z751 Factory to replace the old and worn-out parts after Vietnam was reunified and American-made weapons were replaced with Russian-based weapons. Acquired by capturing during the Vietnam War.
	BRDM-2	Armoured scout car		200	Soviet Union	
	Dongfeng EQ2050	Military light utility vehicle		Unknown	China	Used by Engineers at United Nations Interim Security Force for Abyei.

== Artillery ==
=== Missile artillery / Rocket artillery ===
Image	Model	Type	Variant	Quantity	Origin	Details
	Scud missile	Tactical ballistic missile	Scud B	Unknown	Soviet Union	
	BM-14	140 mm multiple rocket launcher		100	Soviet Union	Delivered in 1965 and 1966; all second hand.
	BM-21 Grad	122 mm multiple rocket launcher		350	Soviet Union	

=== Self-propelled artillery ===
Image	Model	Type	Variant	Quantity	Origin	Details
	K9 Thunder	155mm self-propelled artillery		(+20)	South Korea	$250 million deal includes 20 K9s. Delivered through the Korea Trade-Investment Promotion Agency (KOTRA) as a government-to-government (G2G) transaction
	2S3 Akatsiya	152 mm self-propelled artillery		30	Soviet Union	
	2S1 Gvozdika	122 mm self-propelled artillery	2S1 Gvozdika	150	Soviet Union	
	PTH-130	130 mm wheeled self-propelled howitzer	PTH130-K255B PTH-130	Unknown	Vietnam	Old version use KrAZ-255B chassis combined with M-46 gun. New version use Kamaz 6560 chassis combined with M-46 gun.
	PTH-01	122 mm self-propelled artillery	PTH-01	Unknown	Vietnam	Designed and manufactured by Vietnam Defence Industry.
	PTH-105	105 mm wheeled self-propelled howitzer	PTH105-VN15 M3	Unknown	Vietnam	Designed and manufactured by Z751.Using Ural-375D 6x6 chassis combined with M101 towed howitzer.
	PTH-85	85 mm wheeled self-propelled howitzer	PTH85D44-VN18	Unknown	Vietnam	Designed and manufactured by Z751.Using Ural-375 6x6 chassis combined with D44 field gun.

=== Towed artillery ===
Image	Model	Type	Variant	Quantity	Origin	Details
	ZiS-3	76 mm towed field gun		Unknown	Soviet Union	Mostly used by coastal defence unit or militia
	BS-3	100 mm towed Anti-tank gun		250	Soviet Union	
	T-12	100 mm towed Anti-tank gun		Unknown	Soviet Union	
	MT-12	100 mm towed Anti-tank gun		Unknown	Soviet Union	
	D-44	85 mm field gun	D-44	2,300	Soviet Union Vietnam (maintenance, parts replaced)	The D-44 may be put into reserves soon as its unconventional ammunition will cease production
	M101	105 mm towed howitzer	M101 M2A1	2,300	United States; Vietnam (maintenance, parts replaced)	Modernized. Also used for ceremonial purposes.
	D-74	122 mm field gun	D-74 Type 60	2,300	Soviet Union	The USSR provided 200 D-74s (1970–1971) and China provided 100 Type-60s (1974). Some lost in combat. Uses DP-122D74-PST artillery shells, domestically produced in Vietnam.
	D-30	122 mm towed howitzer		2,300	Soviet Union	The USSR provided 50 D-30s in 1974. Some likely retired over the years.
	M-46	130 mm field gun	M-47 Type 59	2,300	Soviet Union China Vietnam (maintenance, parts replaced)	The USSR provided 519 M-46s (1968–1973). Some lost in combat or retired. Type 59 is a licensed Chinese copy. The PTH130-K225B is a domestic self-propelled prototype. Efforts to extend range from 27 km to 30–40 km. Uses DP-130M46-PST artillery shells, domestically produced in Vietnam.
	D-20	152 mm towed howitzer	D-20 Type 66	Unknown	Soviet Union China	Uses DP-152D20-PST artillery shells, domestically produced in Vietnam.

=== Mortar carriers ===
Image	Model	Type	Quantity	Origin	Details
	M106 mortar carrier	Mortar carrier	Unknown	United States	Self-propelled 107 mm mortars captured in the Vietnam War. Refurbished to equipped with 100 mm mortar SC100TX.
	MT-LB	Mortar carrier	Unknown	Soviet Union	

== Air defense ==
The Military Balance of 2024 from the International Institute for Strategic Studies reported that Vietnam possessed approximately 12,000 guns, including ZSU-23-4 and towed anti-aircraft artillery in calibers of 14.5mm, 30mm, 37mm, 57mm, 85mm, and 100mm. The 85mm gun is possibly the KS-12/K-52. Additionally, Vietnam had a point defense system comprising the 9K32 Strela-2, 9K310 Igla-1, and 9K38 Igla.

=== Man-portable air-defense system (MANPADS) ===
Image	Model	Type	Variant	Caliber	Origin	Details
SA-7	9K32 Strela-2	Man-portable air-defense system	9K32M Strela-2M	72mm	USSR	Designed to counter low-flying targets with its passive infrared homing guidance system.
9K338 Igla-S (NATO-Code - SA-24 Grinch)	9K38 Igla	Man-portable air-defense system	9K130 Igla-1 9K338 Igla-S TL-01	72mm	Soviet Union; Vietnam	Produced at Z131 Factory. TL-01 is a domestic copy of the Igla-S MANPADS, manufactured under license with technology transferred from Russia. More than 400 launcher were produced since 2019 with the unknown amount of ammunition.

=== Anti-aircraft artillery ===
Image	Model	Type	Variant	Caliber	Quantity	Origin	Details
	ZPU	Anti-aircraft gun	ZPU-2 ZPU-4	14.5×114mm		USSR	The ZPU family of anti-aircraft guns includes double and quadruple-barrel versions used during the Vietnam War.
	ZU-23-2	Twin Autocannon	23mm-2M 23mm-2ML	23x152mmB		USSR	
	ZSU-23-4 Shilka	Self-propelled anti-aircraft gun	ZSU-23-4M	23x152mmB		USSR	
	61-K	Autocannon	Type 55 Type 65	37×252mmSR		USSR	
	AZP S-60	Autocannon		57×347mmSR		USSR	

== Aircraft ==
Image	Model	Type	Quantity	Variant	Origin	Detail
	Cessna 208	Geodesy plane		208 Caravan 675	United States	Used by Survey and Aerial Mapping One Member Limited Liability Company (SAMCOM Co.Ltd), a company under the Ministry of Defence

== UAV ==
Image	Model	Type	Variant	Origin	Details
	Teledyne FLIR Black Hornet Nano	Micro air vehicle		Norway	Used by People's Army of Vietnam Special Forces.

== Radar systems ==
Image	Model	Type	Variant	Origin	Details
	SNAR-10	Battlefield Surveillance Systems		Soviet Union	Used by artillery reconnaissance units.
	PJT-531 Battle Field Surveillance Radar – Short Range	Battlefield Surveillance Systems		India	Used by artillery reconnaissance units.

== Electronic warfare (EW) ==
Established in 1992, the Department of Electronic Warfare is part of the Vietnam People's Army.

Image	Model	Type	Variant	Origin	Details
	AJAS-20C	Electronic Counter Measure system		Germany	Mounted on a GAZ-3308 Sadko.
	AJAS-1000	Electronic Counter Measure system		Germany	Mounted on a KamAZ-43253.
	AJAS-5408	Electronic Counter Measure system		Germany	
	SPN-30	Electronic Counter Measure system		Russia	Mounted on a Ural-375 chassis.
	GBR-EAS	Ground Based Radar - Electronic Attack System		Spain	Passive surveillance/analysis (2–18 GHz, with other bands optional). Electronic defense: area/high-value asset/self-protection. Electronic attack: jamming, deception, false-target generation, collaborative techniques. Provided by Indra Sistemas.
	VRS-U3K	Ku-band 3D Drone-counter Radar		Vietnam	Produced and developed by Viettel.
	V-EMP/S	Microwave Directed Energy Weapon		Vietnam	Designed to counter aerial systems. Produced and developed by Viettel.
	VCUS/C	Compact Counter-UAV System		Vietnam	Mounted on a Ford pickup truck. Produced and developed by Viettel.
	VCUS/E	Mobile Tactical Anti-drone Reconnaissance Complex		Vietnam	Composed of VCUS/M plus an unclassified radar system on a KAMAZ 6×6. Generates high-power pulses to disrupt electronics. Produced and developed by Viettel.
	VERA Passive Sensor	Passive Surveillance ESM System	VERA-NG V-ELINT18	Czech Republic; Vietnam	VERA-NG imported and operational since 2015. Commissioned by the General Staff's Electronic Warfare Department in 2021. Domestically produced under the name V-ELINT 18. Specs of V-ELINT18: Track ≤ 500 targets; >10,000 unique targets stored; Range: 450 km; Bandwidth: ≤ 500 MHz; Receiver sensitivity: < –85 dBm (20 MHz bandwidth); Processes radar pulse, SIF/SSR/Mode-S/ADS-B, DME/TACAN, Parol, AIS; Stealth detection; Used for detecting air/sea/land without disclosing position. System includes a central processor and 3 peripheral stations. Produced and developed by Viettel.
	AOR AR3000/AR5000	Radio scanner		Japan	Used for signal reconnaissance.

== CBRN Reconnaissance ==
Image	Model	Type	Origin	Details
	Inspector-1000	Dosimeter	United States	
	RAID-M100	Hand-held chemical agent detectors	United States	
	RAID-XP	Hand-held chemical agent detectors	United States	
	Inficon Hapsite ER	Portable gas chromatography–mass spectrometry	United States	
	RBH-18	CBRN reconnaissance robot	Vietnam	
KC.AT CBRN reconnaissance drone	KC.AT	CBRN reconnaissance drone	Vietnam	
	SKID V-025 STEAM	Decontamination and degassing vehicle	Italy	
	ARS-14	Decontamination and degassing vehicle	Soviet Union	
	ARS-15	Decontamination and degassing vehicle	Soviet Union	
	TMVA DECON-17 EX	Decontamination and degassing vehicle	Czech Republic	
	UAZ-469RH	CBRN reconnaissance vehicle	Soviet Union	Modified from UAZ-469 for nuclear, biological, and chemical (NBC) resistance.
	BRDM-2RKh	CBRN reconnaissance vehicle	Soviet Union	Modified from BRDM-2 for NBC resistance. Radiological-chemical reconnaissance vehicle with KZO-2 dispensers, GSA-12 gas detector, DP-5V dosimeter, DP-3B Geiger counter, DK-4K decontamination system, and PPKhR/VPKhR detection devices.

== Engineering vehicles ==
Image	Model	Type	Quantity	Origin	Details
	BREM-1M	Armoured recovery vehicle		Russia	Based on a T-90 chassis, were ordered together in the T-90 procurement contract.
	BTS-4	Armoured recovery vehicle		Soviet Union	Still widely used and regularly maintained.
	M578	Armored recovery vehicle		United States	
	TMM-3M	Armoured vehicle-launched bridge		Russia	
	AM-50S	Armoured vehicle-launched bridge		Czech Republic	
	MS-20 Daglezja	Armoured vehicle-launched bridge		Poland	
	Schweres Rüstfahrzeug (SRF)	Rescue vehicle		Germany	
	AT-L	Artillery tractor		Soviet Union	
	ATS-59G	Artillery tractor		Soviet Union	
	M548	Artillery tractor		United States	
	IMR-2	Armoured engineering vehicle	2	Soviet Union	Based on a T-72 chassis.
	EOV-4421	Military Excavator		Soviet Union	
	PZM-2	Trencher		Soviet Union	
	TMK-2	Trencher		Soviet Union	
	PTS-M	Tracked amphibious transport		Soviet Union	
	GSP-55	Amphibious bridging vehicle	≥3	Soviet Union	Operated by the 575th Engineer Brigade.
	PMP Floating Bridge	Pontoon bridge	≥3	Soviet Union	At least three in service.
	VSN-1500	Motor canoe		Vietnam	Equipped for engineer units as a light troop transport canoe.
	BMK-T	Motor canoe		Soviet Union	Equipped for pontoon bridge units.
	BMK-150	Motor canoe		Soviet Union	Equipped for pontoon bridge units.
	BMK-130	Motor canoe		Soviet Union	Equipped for pontoon bridge units.

== Logistic / Utility Vehicle ==
Image	Model	Type	Quantity	Origin	Details
Logistic Vehicle
	KamAZ-43118	Military truck		Russia; Vietnam	Domestically manufactured. Replacing older Ural trucks.
	KamAZ-65224	Military truck		Russia; Vietnam	Domestically manufactured. Replacing older Ural trucks.
	KamAZ-43253	Military truck		Russia; Vietnam	Domestically manufactured. Replacing older Ural trucks.
	KamAZ-5350	Military truck		Russia; Vietnam	Chassis of VCS-01 Trường Sơn coastal defense system as well as many many others heavy equipment.
	KamAZ-6560	Military truck		Russia; Vietnam	Chassis of VCS-01 Trường Sơn coastal defense system as well as many many others heavy equipment.
	KamAZ-4350	Military truck		Russia	
	KamAZ-4326	Military truck		Russia	
	Ural-375	Military truck		Soviet Union	
	Ural-4320	Military truck		Soviet Union	
	ZIL-130	Military truck		Soviet Union	
	ZIL-131	Military truck		Soviet Union	
	ZIL-157	Military truck		Soviet Union	
	GAZ-66	Military truck		Soviet Union	
	KrAZ-255	Military truck		Soviet Union	
	KrAZ-6322	Military truck		Ukraine	Used for towing artillery and pontoon bridges.
	GAZ-3308 Sadko	Military truck		Russia	Mostly use as light truck, used extensively by the Signal Corp as a chassis for electronic systems.
	Tatra 815-7	Military truck		Czech Republic	4×4 variant for the Chemical Corps; 8×8 variant chassis for the AM-50S bridge layer.
	MAZ-6317	Military truck		Belarus	Used to tow artillery.
	Isuzu F-Series	Military truck		Japan	
	Hyundai HD170	Military truck		South Korea	
	MAN HX58	Military truck		Germany	Used as the chassis for the SPYDER
	Renault ME160	Military truck		France	Used by 410th Battalion, 683rd Transportation Brigade.
	KZKT-7428	Tank transporter		Russia	Used to transport tanks and heavy equipment.
	MAZ-537	Tank transporter		Soviet Union	Used to transport tanks and heavy equipment.
Utility Vehicle
	Toyota Land Cruiser	SUV	Unknown	Japan	Used by high-ranking officers.
	Ford Transit	Van	Unknown	GER (design); THA; Vietnam (manufacturing)	Used by the Army's communications force.
	Toyota Hilux	Pickup truck	Unknown	Japan (design); THA; Vietnam (manufacturing)	Used by the Military Police force and some Army division.
	Toyota Innova	Light utility vehicle	Unknown	Japan (design); IDN; THA (manufacturing)	Used by Army officers.
	Mitsubishi Pajero	Utility Vehicle	Unknown	Japan; THA; AUT (manufacturing)	Used by the Army's communications force, typically fitted with a VSAT antenna or an NVIS antenna to form a mobile communication station.
	UAZ-469	Military light utility vehicle	Unknown	Soviet Union	Include the more modern Gusar variant.

== Vessel ==
=== Patrol boat ===
Image	Class	Type	Quantity	Origin	Note
	ST-175	Patrol boat		Vietnam	Used by General Department of Logistics and the 962nd River Craft Brigade of the 9th Military Region. Design and built by Z173 Shipyard.
	ST-176A	Patrol boat		Vietnam	Used by General Department of Logistics.
	ST-220	Patrol boat		Vietnam	Used by 5th Military Region and Military Command of Quảng Trị province.

=== Canoe ===
Image	Class	Type	Quantity	Origin	Note
	ST-640	Canoe		Vietnam	
	ST-450	Canoe		Vietnam	

=== Landing craft ===
Image	Class	Type	Quantity	Origin	Note
	LCM-8	Landing craft		United States	Used by 2nd Battalion of the 962nd River Craft Brigade of the 9th Military Region.
	ST-2300	Landing craft		Vietnam	Maxium 80 tons, used by 2nd Battalion of the 962nd River Craft Brigade of the 9th Military Region.
	ST-1200	Landing craft		Vietnam	Used by General Department of Logistics.

== Former ==
=== Infantry weapons ===
==== Pistols ====
Image	Model	Type	Variant	Caliber	Origin	Details
	Mauser C96	Semi-automatic pistol		7.63×25mm Mauser 7.62×25mm Tokarev	Germany	Stored in reserves. North Vietnam also produced a weapon similar to the Mauser, but it was never officially named (possibly Cao Dai 763).

==== Submachine guns ====
Image	Model	Type	Variant	Caliber	Origin	Details
	PPSh-41	Submachine gun	Type 50 K-50M	7.62×25mm Tokarev	Soviet Union	Stored in reserve.
	PPS submachine gun	Submachine gun	PPS-43	7.62×25mm Tokarev	Soviet Union	Stored in reserve.
	PM-63	Machine pistol/Submachine gun		9×18mm Makarov	Poland	Used by People's Army of Vietnam Special Forces and Guard Police. Retired, may still be in reserve.
	Škorpion	Submachine gun		.32 ACP	Czechoslovak Socialist Republic	Formerly used by the North Vietnamese and Viet Cong. Potentially transferred to Militia.
	Thompson submachine gun	Submachine gun		.45 ACP	United States	Used by Viet Cong during Vietnam War.
	MAT-49	Submachine gun		9×19mm Parabellum 7.62×25mm Tokarev	France	Thousands of guns were confiscated by the Viet Minh.
	MAS-38	Submachine gun		7.65mm Longue	France	Thousands of guns were confiscated by the Viet Minh.
	Sten	Submachine gun		9×19mm Parabellum	United Kingdom	Thousands of rifles were seized by the Viet Minh from British and French troops during the fighting.
	Lanchester	Submachine gun		9×19mm Parabellum	United Kingdom	Probably from captured war booty or purchased through secret channels from Thailand and Malaysia.
	M3	Submachine gun		.45 ACP	United States	Thousands of guns were confiscated by the Viet Minh.
	Madsen M-50	Submachine gun		9×19mm Parabellum	Denmark	Thousands of guns were confiscated by the Viet Minh.
	MP 40	Submachine gun		9×19mm Parabellum	Nazi Germany	Thousands of guns were confiscated by the Viet Cong.
Samopal_Vz_25	Sa 23	Submachine gun	Sa 25 Sa 26	9×19mm Parabellum 7.62×25mm Tokarev	Soviet Union	Thousands of guns were confiscated by the Viet Cong.
	Type 64	Submachine gun		7.62×25mm Tokarev	China	Thousands of guns were confiscated by the Viet Cong.

==== Assault rifles ====
Image	Model	Type	Variant	Caliber	Origin	Details
	AMD-65	Assault rifle		7.62×39mm	Hungarian People's Republic	Limited use. Potentially still in used by People's Army of Vietnam Special Forces in the 2010s. Although mainly seen in reserve.
	vz. 58	Assault rifle		7.62×39mm	Czechoslovakia	Limited use.
	Type 63	Assault rifle		7.62×39mm	China	Used by Militia and Self-defense Forces.
	Type 58	Assault rifle		7.62×39mm	North Korea	Sent as military aid by North Korea during the Vietnam War. Limited use.
	SKS	Semi-automatic rifle		7.62×39mm	Soviet Union	Used by Honor Guards, Militia Forces, and for ceremonial purposes.
	M1 Garand	Battle rifle		.30-06 Springfield	United States	Largely captured after the Vietnam War. Stored in reserves.
	M14	Battle rifle		7.62×51mm NATO	United States	Largely captured after the Vietnam War. Stored in reserves.
	M1 Carbine	Carbine		.30 carbine	United States	Largely captured after the Vietnam War. Stored in reserves.
	Vz. 54	Bolt-action rifle		7.62×54mmR	Czechoslovakia	Stored in reserves.
	Mosin–Nagant	Bolt-action rifle		7.62×54mmR	Soviet Union	Still seen in service, as a sniper rifle by 2021.
	Gras rifle	Bolt-action rifle		11×59mmR Gras	France	Captured in the First Indochina War.
	Lebel rifle	Bolt-action rifle		8×50mmR Lebel	France	Captured in the First Indochina War.
	Hanyang 88	Bolt-action rifle		7.92×57mm Mauser	Qing dynasty	Captured in the First Indochina War.
	Berthier rifle	Bolt-action rifle		8×50mmR Lebel	France	Captured in the First Indochina War.
	Mauser 98	Bolt-action rifle		7.92×57mm Mauser	German Empire	Captured in the First Indochina War.
	Fusil Mle 1902 "Indochinois	Bolt-action rifle		8×50mmR Lebel	France	Captured in the First Indochina War.
	Type 38 rifle	Bolt-action rifle		6.5×50mmSR Arisaka	Empire of Japan	Captured in the First Indochina War.
	M1917 Enfield	Battle rifle		.30-06 Springfield	United States	Largely captured after the Vietnam War. Stored in reserves.
	Type 99 rifle	Bolt-action rifle		7.7×58mm Arisaka	Empire of Japan	Captured in the First Indochina War.
	MAS-36	Bolt-action rifle		7.5×54mm French	France	Captured in the First Indochina War.
	MAS-44	Bolt-action rifle		7.5×54mm French	France	Captured in the First Indochina War.
	MAS-49	Bolt-action rifle		7.5×54mm French	France	Captured in the First Indochina War.
	Karabiner 98k	Bolt-action rifle		7.92×57mm Mauser	Nazi Germany	Supplied by the Soviet Union.
	M1903 Springfield	Bolt-action rifle		.30-06 Springfield	United States	Stored in reserves.
	Lee-Enfield	Bolt-action rifle	SBT7MK4	.303 British	British Empire; Vietnam (maintenance, parts replaced)	Limited use by Militia Forces. Modernized as the SBT7MK4, chambered in 7.62×51mm NATO.

==== Machine guns ====
Image	Model	Type	Variant	Caliber	Origin	Details
	Degtyaryov machine gun	Light machine gun		7.62×54mmR	Soviet Union	Large number were stored in reserved.
	SG-43 Goryunov	Medium machine gun		7.62×54mmR	Soviet Union	Large number were stored in reserved.
	Uk vz. 59	General-purpose machine gun		7.62×54mmR	Czechoslovakia	Used by PAVN and Viet Cong during the Vietnam War.
	Type 67	General-purpose machine gun		7.62×54mmR	China	Used by PAVN and Viet Cong during the Vietnam War.
	TUL-1	Light machine gun		7.62×39mm	Vietnam	Vietnamese TUL-1 light machine gun used the Type 56 frame with an RPK stock, RPD sights, and 30-round AK-47/Type 56 magazines. Manufactured 1970–1974, replaced after local RPK production.
	MG 34	General-purpose machine gun		7.92×57mm Mauser	Nazi Germany	Used by the NVA and Viet Cong in the Vietnam War.
	M60	General-purpose machine gun		7.62×51mm NATO	United States	Used by PAVN. Limited use.
	Mk 21 Mod 0	Medium machine gun		7.62×51mm NATO	United States	Limited use.
	Type 24	Heavy machine gun		7.92×57mm Mauser	China	
	PM M1910	Heavy machine gun		7.62×54mmR	Russian Empire	Aided by North Korea.
	MG 42	General-purpose machine gun		7.92×57mm Mauser	Nazi Germany	Aided by Soviet Union.
	MG 42	General-purpose machine gun		7.92×57mm Mauser	Nazi Germany	Aided by Soviet Union.

==== Sniper rifles ====
Image	Model	Type	Variant	Caliber	Origin	Details
	PSL	Designated marksman rifle		7.62×54mmR	Socialist Republic of Romania	May have been retired and replaced by IWI Galatz.

==== Grenade launchers ====
Image	Model	Type	Variant	Caliber	Origin	Details
	Mk 19 grenade launcher	Automatic grenade launcher		40×53 mm	United States	Used in the Sino-Vietnamese War.

==== Mortars ====
Image	Model	Type	Variant	Caliber	Origin	Details
	Lance Grenades de 50 mm modèle 37	Infantry mortar		50 mm Mortar	France	
	Brandt Mle 1935	Infantry mortar		60 mm Mortar	France	
	Brandt Mle 27/31	Infantry mortar		81 mm Mortar	France	
81_mm_Mortar_M1_in_South_Korea	M1 mortar	Infantry mortar		81 mm Mortar	United States	
	M29 mortar	Infantry mortar		81 mm Mortar	United States	
	82-PM-37	Infantry mortar		82 mm Mortar	Soviet Union	
	M2 4.2-inch mortar	Mortar		107 mm Mortar	United States	
	M1938	Mortar		107 mm Mortar	Soviet Union	
	PM-43	Mortar	Type 53 Type 55	120 mm Mortar	Soviet Union	Stored in reserves, replace by SC100TX.
	Mortier Brandt de 120 mm modèle 1935	Mortar		120 mm Mortar	France	
	M1943	Mortar		160 mm Mortar	Soviet Union	Stored in reserves, replace by SC100TX.

==== Rocket-propelled Grenade (RPG) / Anti-armor weapon ====
Image	Model	Type	Variant	Caliber	Origin	Details
Rocket-propelled Grenade (RPG)
	RPG-2	Rocket-propelled grenade	B-40 Type 56	40 mm HEAT	Soviet Union	Internally codenamed B-40. Stored in reserve.
ANA_soldier_with_RPG-7_in_2013-cropped	Type 69 RPG	Rocket-propelled grenade		40 mm HEAT	China	Stored in reserve.
Recoilless Rifle
	Specialized Recoilless Gun (SSAT)	Anti-tank recoilless rifle	SSAT-32 SSAT-50	32 mm HEAT 50 mm HEAT	Vietnam	Used by Viet Minh during First Indochina War.
	M18	Anti-tank recoilless rifle	Type 36	57 mm HEAT	United States	Used by Viet Minh and Viet Cong during First Indochina War and Vietnam War.
	Recoilless single-shot anti-tank rifle "SS"	Anti-tank recoilless rifle	SSA-66 SSB-73 SSB-81 SSB-88	66 mm HEAT 73 mm HEAT 81 mm HEAT 88 mm HEAT	Vietnam	Used by Viet Minh during First Indochina War.
	M20	Anti-tank recoilless rifle	Type 52 Type 56	75 mm HEAT	United States	Used by Viet Minh and Viet Cong during First Indochina War and Vietnam War.
	"SKZ"	Anti-tank recoilless rifle	SKZ-51 SKZ-81 SKZ-120 SKZ-175	51 mm HEAT 81 mm HEAT 120 mm HEAT 175 mm HEAT	Vietnam	Used by Viet Minh during First Indochina War.
	Bazooka	Anti-tank recoilless rifle	M1 "Bazooka" M20 "Super Bazooka" Type 51	60 mm HEAT 89 mm HEAT	United States Vietnam	Mainly sourced from the French Army,or aided from China, some were supported by the OSS Deer Team. Professor Tran Dai Nghia based his design on this to create a completely Vietnamese 60mm anti-tank gun. A 75mm version was produced by Trinh Van Yen.
	B-11	Anti-tank recoilless rifle		107 mm HEAT	Soviet Union	Stored in reserves.
	M-40	Anti-tank recoilless rifle		105 mm HEAT	United States	Stored in reserves.

=== Artillery ===
==== Towed artillery ====
Image	Model	Type	Variant	Quantity	Origin	Details
	M-30	122 mm field gun			Soviet Union	The USSR provided 450 M-30s from 1964 to 1969. Some were lost or retired. Stored in reserves.
	ML-20	152 mm howitzer			Soviet Union	Large number stored in reserve in good condition.
	M114	155 mm towed howitzer			United States	Stored in reserves.

==== Self-propelled artillery / Mobile artillery ====
Image	Model	Type	Variant	Quantity	Origin	Details
	ASU-85	85 mm assault gun	ASU-85		Soviet Union	Vietnam is no longer an operator of the ASU-85 as of the 2018 Military Balance, they are likely in reserve or training
	M107	175mm self-propelled gun			United States	Likely in reserve

=== Air defense ===
==== Anti-aircraft artillery ====
Image	Model	Type	Variant	Caliber	Quantity	Origin	Details
	ZSU-57-2	57 mm self-propelled anti-aircraft gun	ZSU-57-2	57×347 mmSR	500	Soviet Union	Stored in reserve.
	8.8 cm Flak 18/36/37/41	88 mm anti-aircraft gun		88×571 mmR		Nazi Germany	Received from the USSR starting in 1954; used against US fighter jets in the early '60s.

== Development ==
This section includes weapons in planning, development, or testing phases. Existing systems being modified remain in notes.

Development completed
Development ongoing
Development cancelled

=== Infantry Weapon ===
==== Assault Rifle ====
Image	Model	Type	Caliber	Origin	Details
	STL-556VN	Assault rifle	5.56×45mm NATO	Vietnam	Chambered in 5.56×45mm NATO. Features foldable, adjustable stock and full-length Picatinny rail. Manufactured locally at Z111 Factory.
	SHMT-M1	Underwater rifle	5.56×45mm NATO flechettes	Vietnam	Chambered in 7.62×39mm. Features a retractable, adjustable stock and full-length Picatinny rail. Manufactured locally at Z111 Factory.
	STV-270	Assault rifle	7.62×39mm	Vietnam	Chambered in 7.62×39mm. Features a retractable, adjustable stock and full-length Picatinny rail. Manufactured locally at Z111 Factory.
	STV-410	Assault rifle	7.62×39mm	Vietnam	Chambered in 7.62×39mm. Features a retractable, adjustable stock and full-length Picatinny rail. Manufactured locally at Z111 Factory.
	STV-416	Assault rifle	7.62×39mm	Vietnam	Chambered in 7.62×39mm. Features a retractable, adjustable stock. Manufactured locally at Z111 Factory.

==== Anti-tank mine ====
Image	Model	Type	Variant	Origin	Details
	MCT-83	Anti-tank mine		Vietnam	When the target is 200m away, it will detect vibrations and report to the central command box. When the command center receives the signal, the safety catch opens and the infrared sensor activates. Manufactured locally at The General Department of Defence Industry.
	MCT-72	Anti-tank mine		Vietnam	When the watch is removed, the mine will activate after about 30-120 seconds. The mine will detonate using magnetic fields. If it detects a difference in magnetic field strength compared to the surrounding magnetic field and reaches the preset threshold, it will self-detonate. Manufactured locally at The General Department of Defence Industry.

==== Mortar ====
Image	Model	Type	Caliber	Origin	Details
	Silenced mortar	Silenced mortar	82 mm Mortar	Vietnam	82 mm silenced mortar based on the Russian 2B25 mortar 2B25.
	Semi-automatic mortar	Semi-automatic mortar	100 mm Mortar	Vietnam	Semi-automatic mortar based on the SC100TX. Vehicle-mounted, domestic production. Specs: Range: 6–10 km Fire rate: 6–10 rounds/min Weight: 1.6 tons

=== Ground vehicles ===
==== Tanks ====
Image	Model	Type	Quantity	Origin	Details
	T-1	Amphibious tank		Vietnam	Manufactured by Z125 Factory. Finished prototype and autoloader shown during Colonel General Phạm Hoài Nam's visit to Factory Z125 on 24 April 2026.

==== Armored personnel carriers (APC) ====
Image	Model	Type	Quantity	Origin	Details
	XTC-03	Wheeled armoured personnel carrier		Vietnam	Manufactured at Z111 factory. 8×8 APC design by Vietnam Defence Industry ( VDI). Finished prototype and shown during Colonel General Phạm Hoài Nam's visit to Factory Z111 24 April 2026.

=== Artillery ===
==== Rocket / Missile artillery ====
Image	Model	Type	Quantity	Origin	Details
	Modular M270-based MRLS (TLDĐ-02)	Multiple Launch Rocket System		Vietnam	Mounted on a KamAZ 8×8 chassis with M270-style modular launch tubes (leaked images).
	Z113 Rocket Launcher	70 mm multiple rocket launcher		Vietnam	Produced by Z113 Factory; displayed at Vietnam Defense Expo 2024; mounted on Toyota pickup; 750 kg. Specs: Range: 5–7 km; Warhead weight: 4.0–4.5 kg; Length: 950–975 mm; Capacity: 40 rounds; Fire rate: 120 rpm; Control: remote/manual; Features: impact/proximity fuse, laser rangefinder

==== Self-propelled artillery ====
Image	Model	Type	Quantity	Origin	Details
	PTH-01	122mm self-propelled artillery		Vietnam	Researched and manufactured by The General Department of Defence Industry. The design already completed and prototype is currently being tested.
	PTH-152	152 mm self-propelled artillery		Vietnam	Researched and modernized by Viettel base on D-20 , displayed at 80 Years Journey of Independence-Freedom-Happiness 2025. Specs: Maximum rate of fire: ≥ 4 rounds/min; FCS; Electronic warface system; 12,7mm RCWS; Smoke grenades, laser warning; Crews: 5-6 persons; Protection STANAG 4569; Weight: , 34 tons; Maximum speed: ≥ 70 km/h
	PTH-130	130 mm self-propelled artillery		Vietnam	Researched and modernized by Viettel and MTA base on M46, install on Kamaz 6560 or KrAZ-255B , displayed at 12th Congress of the Party Committee of the Army and 80 Years Journey of Independence-Freedom-Happiness 2025. Specs: Maximum rate of fire: ≥ 8 rounds/min; FCS; Electronic warface system; Crews: 5-6 persons; Weight: , 23,3 tons; Maximum speed: ≥ 70 km/h

=== Air defense ===
==== Anti-aircraft artillery ====
Image	Model	Type	Caliber	Quantity	Origin	Details
	VDI-SPAAG-2×30	Self-propelled anti-aircraft gun	30×210 mm		Vietnam	Based on XCB-01 chassis; conceptual (not final design). Specs: 360° AESA search radar; Optoelectronic suite; Ku-band tracking radar; Smoke grenades, laser warning; FCS; Remote-controlled turret; ABM/AHEAD ammunition; 7.62 mm coaxial MG; AA missile launcher (likely TL-01)

== Procurement ==
Procurement completed
Procurement ongoing
Procurement cancelled

=== Infantry weapon ===
==== Rocket-propelled grenade (RPG) / Anti-Armor weapon ====
Image	Model	Type	Caliber	Origin	Details
Anti-tank Guided Missile (ATGM)
	Spike (missile)	Anti-tank guided missile	130–170 mm	Israel	Vietnam is finalizing a $500 million deal with Rafael to produce Spike missiles domestically.

=== Ground vehicles ===
Vietnam signed a 2002–2005 military-technical cooperation agreement with Ukraine to upgrade armor and artillery, and improve co-production and repair. It also signed with Russia and developed domestic production and repair capabilities.

==== Tanks ====
Image	Model	Type	Quantity	Origin	Details
Alabino05042017-40	T-72	Main battle tank	150	Soviet Union; Poland	Poland agreed in March 2005 to sell Vietnam 150 T-72s for training, maintenance, and repair, but cancelled in 2006 to focus on Navy and Air Force.
T-59 MBT pic-022	T-54/55	Main battle tank		Soviet Union; Israel	In 2006, Israel reported selling two light armored vehicles to Vietnam (UNROCA). Israeli firms bid to modernize T-54/55s with armor, night vision, and FCS upgrades (Poland-produced).
T-59 MBT pic-022	T-54/55	Main battle tank	70	Soviet Union; Finland	In February 2005, Finland ceded about 70 Soviet-era T-54/55 tanks to Vietnam.

==== Self-propelled artillery / Mobile artillery ====
Image	Model	Type	Quantity	Origin	Details
	K9 Thunder	155 mm self-propelled artillery	20	South Korea	$250 million deal includes 20 K9s, will be delivered through the Korea Trade-Investment Promotion Agency (KOTRA) as a government-to-government (G2G) transaction

== See also ==
- People's Army of Vietnam
- List of equipment of the Vietnam People's Navy
- List of equipment of the Vietnam People's Air Force
- People's Army of Vietnam Special Forces
- Naval Air Force, Vietnam People's Navy
- Vietnam Coast Guard
- Vietnam People's Public Security
- Vietnam Fisheries Surveillance

== Sources ==
- International Institute for Strategic Studies (2025). The Military Balance 2025. London: Routledge. ISBN 978-1-041-04967-8.
