= K20 =

K20 may refer to:

- Fairchild K-20, an aerial camera used during World War II
- HMS K20, an M-class submarine of the Royal Navy
- K-20 (Kansas highway)
- K-20: Legend of the Mask, a 2008 Japanese film
- K20, a model of Honda K engine
- K20 camouflage, a Vietnamese camouflage pattern
- K20 Center, an American research institute
- Kaman K-20, an American helicopter
- Qiantu K20, a Chinese subcompact hatchback
- Redmi K20, a Chinese smartphone
