= 9th Military Region (Vietnam People's Army) =

Vietnamese military unit

Coordinates: 10.1°N 105.6°E

Quân khu 9 (9th Military Region)
- Military Region emblem
- Active: 10 December 1945 – present
- Country: Vietnam
- Allegiance: People's Army of Vietnam
- Branch: Active duty
- Role: Regular force
- Size: Equivalent to Corps
- Part of: People's Army of Vietnam
- Garrison/HQ: Cần Thơ
- Colors: Flag of the People's Army of Vietnam.svg
- Engagements: First Indochina War; Vietnam War; Cambodian–Vietnamese War
- Decorations: Gold Star Order

Commanders
- Current commander: Lieutenant General Nguyễn Xuân Dắt
- Political commissar: Lieutenant General Hồ Văn Thái

The 9th Military Region of Vietnam People's Army, is directly under the Ministry of Defence of Vietnam, tasked to organise, build, manage and command armed forces defending the Mekong Delta.

== Agencies ==
- Department of Staff
  - Armored Company (BRDM-2)
  - Reconnaissance Battalion
  - Guard Battalion
  - 815th Artillery Command Battalion
  - 2012th Commando Battalion
  - 97th Electronic Warfare Battalion (A2 EW & jammer vehicle)
  - 893rd Chemical Defense Battalion (UAZ-469RKh, ARS-14)
- Department of Politics
  - Division of Organisation
  - Division of Cadre
  - Division of Policy
  - Division of Propaganda and Training
  - Division of Thoughts and Culture
  - Military Court of Military Region
  - 91st Regional Military Procuracy
  - K90 Unit (body recovery unit)
- Department of Logistics - Technical
  - 659th Transportation Brigade
    - 1st Transportation Battalion
    - 41st Transportation Battalion (MAZ truck, ZIL-130)
    - 804th Marine Transportation Battalion
    - 805th Marine Transportation Battalion
  - 120th Military Hospital
  - 121st Military Hospital
  - Center for Cultivation, Research and Medicinal Materials Processing of 9th Military Region (Đồng Tâm Snake Farm)
  - 201st Workshop
  - 202nd Workshop
  - 203rd Workshop
  - 301st Warehouse
  - 302nd Warehouse
  - 303rd Warehouse
  - K34 Fuel Depot
- 9th Military Region Military School

== Subordinate units ==
- Military Command of Cần Thơ
  - Border Guard Command of Cần Thơ
  - 114th Infantry Regiment
  - 897th Infantry Regiment
  - 932nd Infantry Regiment
  - 3 Mechanized Reconnaissance Companies (BTR-152)
  - Signals Company
  - Guard - Military Police Platoon
  - Armory Warehouse Company
- Military Command of Đồng Tháp Province
  - Border Guard Command of Đồng Tháp
  - 43rd Infantry Regiment
  - 320th Infantry Regiment
  - 924th Infantry Regiment
  - 2 Mechanized Reconnaissance Companies (BTR-152)
  - Engineer Company
  - Signals Company
  - Guard - Military Police Platoon
  - K1 Warehouse
  - 908th Shooting Range
  - K91 Unit (body recovery unit)
- Military Command of Vĩnh Long Province
  - Border Guard Command of Vĩnh Long
  - 890th Infantry Regiment
  - 895th Infantry Regiment
  - 926th Infantry Regiment
  - 3 Mechanized Reconnaissance Companies (BTR-152)
  - Engineer Company
  - Signals Company
  - Armory Warehouse Company
- Military Command of An Giang Province
  - Border Guard Command of An Giang
  - 44th Infantry Regiment
  - 45th Infantry Regiment
  - 892nd Infantry Regiment
  - 893rd Infantry Regiment
  - 2 Mechanized Reconnaissance Companies (BTR-152)
  - Guard – Military Police Platoon
  - Signals Company
  - Engineer Company
  - Armory Warehouse Company
  - K92 Unit (body recovery unit)
  - K93 Unit (body recovery unit)
- Military Command of Cà Mau Province
  - Border Guard Command of Cà Mau
  - 46th Infantry Regiment
  - 894th Infantry Regiment
  - 896th Infantry Regiment
  - 2 Mechanized Reconnaissance Companies (BTR-152)
  - Signals Company
  - Engineer Company
- 4th Division
  - 2nd Infantry Regiment
  - 10th Infantry Regiment
  - 30th Infantry Regiment
  - Medical Battalion
- 8th Division
  - 1st Infantry Regiment
  - 2nd Infantry Regiment
  - 9th Infantry Regiment
  - 12.7mm AA Battalion
- 330th Division
  - 1st Infantry Regiment
  - 3rd Infantry Regiment
  - 20th Infantry Regiment
  - Reconnaissance Company
  - 100mm Mortar Battalion
  - SPG-9 Battalion
  - 12.7mm AA Battalion
  - Signals Battalion
  - Engineer Battalion
  - Transportation Battalion
  - Medical Battalion
  - Chemical Defense Battalion
  - Chi Lăng Shooting Range
- 950th Brigade (Phú Quốc Island defense brigade)
  - 860th Infantry Battalion
  - 557th Tank Battalion (Type 63 tank)
  - Artillery Battalion (M101 howitzers)
  - Air Defense Battalion (DShK)
  - Construction Engineer Company
- 152nd Infantry Regiment (Thổ Chu Island defense)
- 416th Tank Brigade
  - 2nd Tank Battalion (PT-76)
  - 8th Tank Battalion (PT-76, M113 ACAV)
  - 9th Tank Battalion (PT-76)
  - Reconnaissance Company (BRDM-2)
  - 13th Signals Company
  - 11th Repair Company
- 962nd Brigade "Ho Chi Minh Sea Trail Unit"
  - 1st Ship Battalion
  - 2nd Ship Battalion
- 25th Engineer Brigade
  - 1st Engineer Battalion (Structural)
  - 2nd Engineer Battalion (Road and Bridge)
  - 3rd Engineer Battalion (Headquarters, emplacement)
  - 4th River Crossing Battalion (PMP floating bridge, BMK-T motor boats)
  - Reconnaissance Platoon
  - Repair Company
- 6th Artillery Brigade
  - 1st Artillery Battalion (D-74 field guns, D-20 howitzers)
  - 2nd Artillery Battalion (M101 howitzers)
  - 3rd Artillery Battalion (BM-14MM MLRS)
  - Command Company
  - Repair Station
- 226th Air Defense Brigade
  - 11th Air Defense Battalion (AZP S-60)
  - 145th Air Defense Battalion (Type 65 anti-aircraft gun, GLLADS-M3 fire control system)
- 29th Signals Brigade
  - 1st Signals Battalion (radio communication)
  - 2nd Signals Battalion (wired communication)
  - 3nd Signals Battalion (specialized signal vehicle & SATCOM)
- 915th Economic - Defense Group
- 925th Economic - Defense Group (responsible for the southwest coast and islands)
- 959th Economic - Defense Group

=== Independent units ===
- 596th Signals Brigade of Signals Arms (HQ: Ho Chi Minh City)
  - 14th Signals Battalion (Cần Thơ)
- 87th Chemical Defense Brigade of Chemical Arms (HQ: Đồng Nai)
  - Toxic Chemical and Radiological Response and Environmental Warning - Southwestern Regional Center (Phú Quốc Island)

== Successive Commander and Leadership ==
=== Commanders ===
- Senior Colonel Đồng Văn Cống (1964–1969), Major General (1974), Trung tướng (1980)
- Senior Colonel Lê Đức Anh (1969–1974)
- Lieutenant General Lê Đức Anh (1976-June 1978): Colonel General (1980), General (1984), Chief of General Staff of Vietnam People's Army (1986–1987), Minister of Defence (1987–1991), President of Vietnam (1992–1997)
- Major General Nguyễn Chánh (1978–1979): Lieutenant General (1984), Director of the General Logistics Department
- Lieutenant General Trần Văn Nghiêm (1979–1983)
- Lieutenant General Nguyễn Thới Bưng (1983–1986)
- Lieutenant General Nguyễn Đệ (1986–1996)
- Lieutenant General Nguyễn Văn Tấn (1996–2000)
- Lieutenant General Huỳnh Tiền Phong (2000–2007)
- Lieutenant General Trần Phi Hổ (2007–2011)
- Lieutenant General Nguyễn Phương Nam (2011–2015)
- Lieutenant General Nguyễn Hoàng Thủy (2015–2020)
- Lieutenant General Nguyễn Xuân Dắt (2020–present)

=== Political Commissioners, Deputy Commanders of Politics ===
- Lieutenant General Nguyễn Hùng Phong
- Major General Lê Văn Tưởng (1976–1978)
- Major General Bùi Văn Huấn: promoted to Lieutenant General, Deputy Director of the General Political Department, member of Central Committee of the Communist Party of Vietnam
- Lieutenant General Nguyễn Việt Quân: member of Central Committee of the Communist Party of Vietnam
- Lieutenant General Đinh Văn Cai
- Lieutenant General Huỳnh Chiến Thắng: member of Central Committee of the Communist Party of Vietnam, then promoted to Deputy Chief of General Staff of Vietnam People's Army
- Major General Nguyễn Văn Gấu: member of Central Committee of the Communist Party of Vietnam, then promoted to deputy director of the General Political Department
- Major General Hồ Văn Thái
