= Vietnam Border Guard =

Border security branch of the Vietnam People's Army

Vietnam Border Guard Bộ đội Biên phòng
- Patch

- Logo

- Insignia

- Flag
- Abbreviation: BĐBP
- Motto: Đồn là nhà, Biên giới là quê hương, Đồng bào các dân tộc là anh em ruột thịt lit. 'The post is our home, the frontier is our motherland, the compatriots are our siblings'

Agency overview
- Formed: 3 March 1959

Jurisdictional structure
- Operations jurisdiction: Vietnam
- Governing body: Ministry of Defence (Vietnam)
- General nature: Military police
- Specialist jurisdiction: National border patrol, security, integrity

Operational structure
- Overseen by: Vietnam Border Guard Command
- Headquarters: Hanoi, Vietnam
- Agency executives: Lieutenant General Vũ Trung Kiên, Commander; Lieutenant General Nguyễn Anh Tuấn, Political Commissar; Major General Hoàng Hữu Chiến, Chief of Staff
- Parent agency: Vietnam People's Army
- Commands: Vietnam Border Guard Command

Notables
- Significant Border Guard: Vietnam War; Cambodian-Vietnamese War; Sino-Vietnamese War; MT Orkim Harmony hijacking
- Anniversary: 3 March (date of establishment)

Website
- www.bienphongvietnam.gov.vn
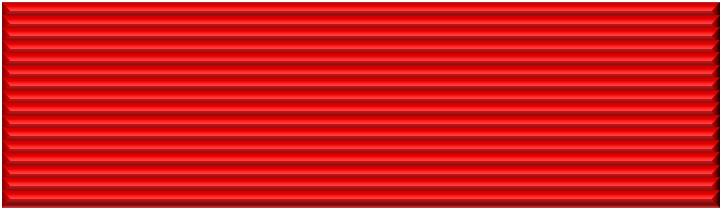
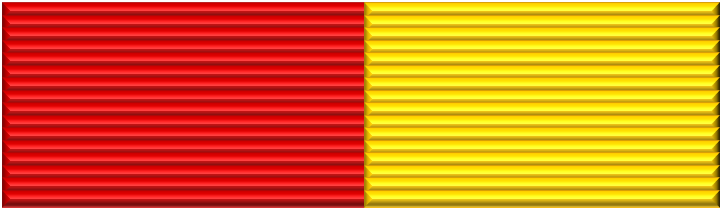
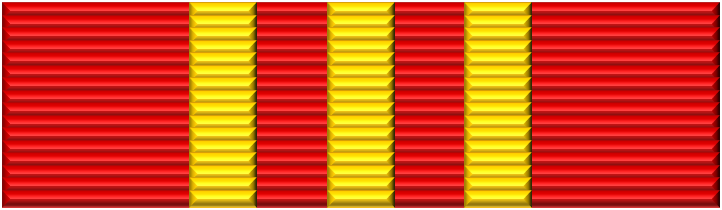
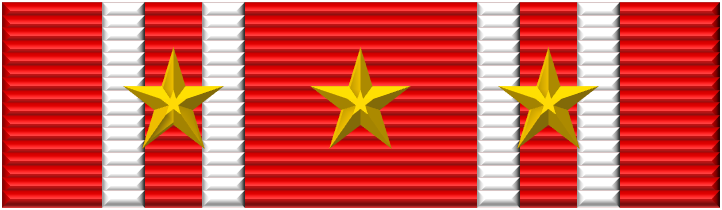
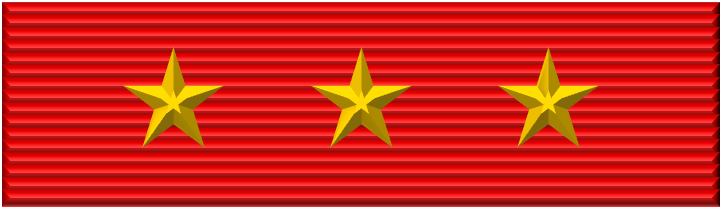
- Decoration: Hero of the People's Armed Forces x2; Gold Star Order (Vietnam); Ho Chi Minh Order; Order of Independence; Military Exploit Order; Colour: Forest Green Ensign: Badge

The Vietnam Border Guard (Vietnamese: Bộ đội Biên phòng Việt Nam - BĐBP or BP) is the border security branch of the Vietnam People's Army.

It is responsible for the management and protection of the sovereignty, territorial integrity, security, order and national boundaries on the mainland, islands, sea and at the gate as shall by law and is force member in provincial areas of defence, border districts of the Socialist Republic of Vietnam.

== Origins ==
On 19 November 1958, the Politburo of the Workers' Party of Vietnam decided to unite national defence forces and army units whose missions were domestic protection, border protection, beach defence, boundary security, and other forces in charge of guarding domestic international borders, under the management of the Police Department, and named them the Guard forces. Guard forces including Border Guard and Homeland Guard.

According to the resolution of the Politburo, the Border Guard is responsible for:

- Repressing spies, commandos, bandits, sea pirates and small cliques participating in destructive activities in border and coastal regions;
- Attacking any army that infringes on national borders, and to cope with all activities of war while awaiting army reinforcement;
- Preventing and punishing smugglers in border areas;
- Implementing regulations on cross-border traffic promulgated by the government of Socialist Republic of Vietnam and control cross-border traffic, including cars, people, baggage, goods, works and cultural objects;
- Protecting life and property, including State property, in the border areas.

The Homeland Guard is responsible for (this task was transferred to police protection under the General Department of Police, Ministry of Public Security):

- Suppress all destructive activities of the small fee, parachuting spies and violence, destruction of the other counter-revolutionary cliques;
- Protect the headquarters, the leader of the Party and State, the diplomatic missions, international leaders and foreign guests visiting to Vietnam;
- Protect factories, mines, warehouses important, the centre of important contact information, clues and important transport axis, and an important transport, cultural facilities, science and Art is important;
- Protect Capital, cities and towns is important, protecting the rallies by the central government regulations, executive orders curfew as needed and the people's police to maintain order general security;
- Guarding the camps, prisons, escorting political prisoners and criminal matter, the hearing protection.

On 3 March 1959, the Prime Minister of Vietnam signed Decision No. 100 - TTg on the establishment of an armed force in charge of border protection and domestic, to be known as the People's Armed Police, set under the leadership of the Ministry of Public Security. This date is taken as the date of establishment of the Vietnam Border Guard.

Ceremony set up the People's Armed Police was held on the evening of 28 March 1959, at 19 hours, at the Military Club, Hanoi.

By the end of 1979 the People's Armed Police was renamed Border Guard and transferred under the Ministry of Defence (Vietnam). In 1988, the Border Guard moved to directly under the Ministry of Interior until late in 1995, then moved to the Ministry of Defence (Vietnam).

== Mission ==
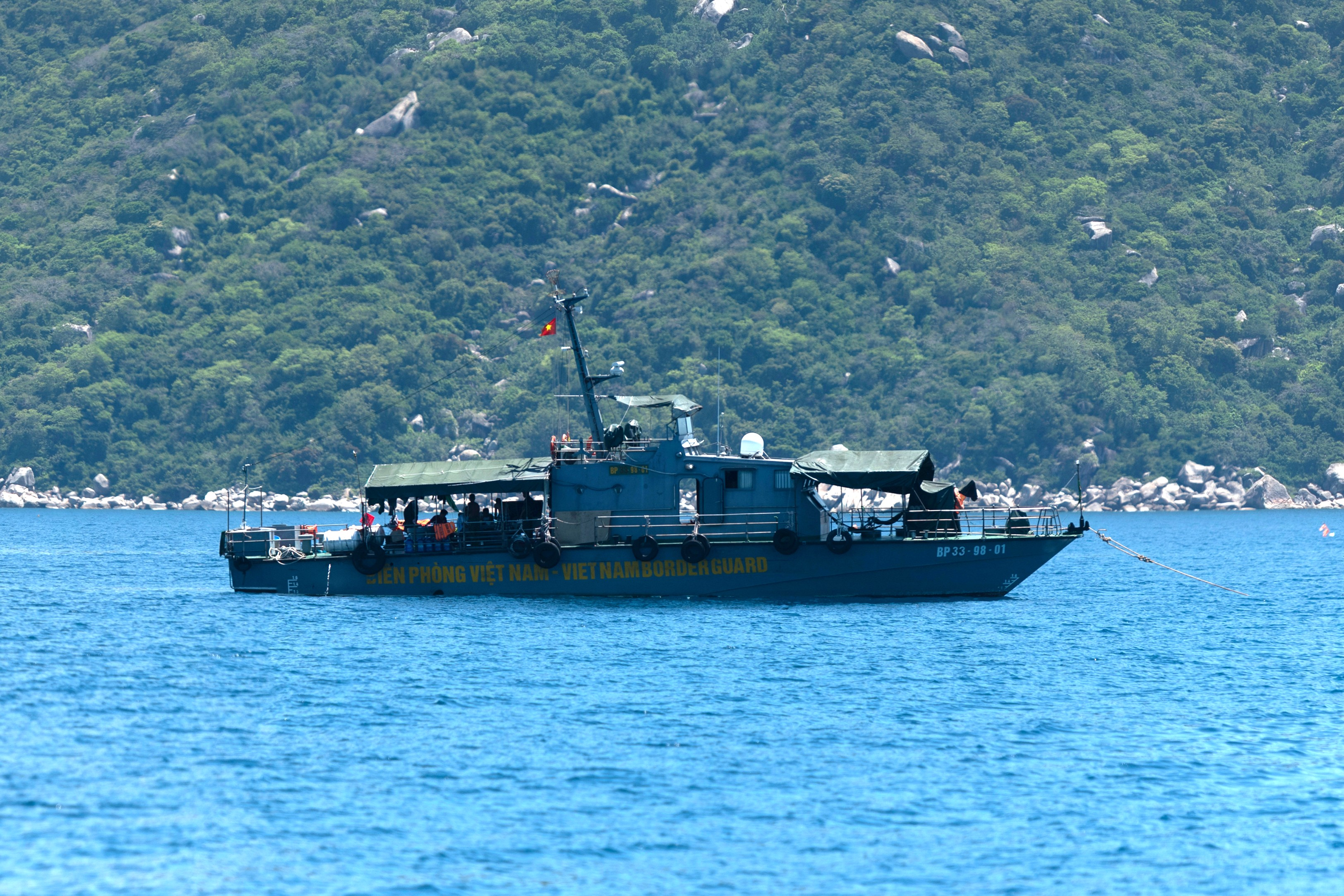
A Border Guard ship as seen in Nha Trang in 2023.

Border Guard is the core force in charge, in co-ordination with other armed forces, localities and departments concerned and depend on people to manage, protect borders, maintaining security political, social order and safety in the border areas, maintaining the external border. Border Guard operates under the laws of the Socialist Republic of Vietnam, the international treaties relating to the sovereignty, national security and border on the mainland, islands, seas and border gates that the Socialist Republic of Vietnam has signed or acceded to.

== Structure ==
The organisational system of Border Guard includes:

- Command of Border Guard
  - General Staff
  - Political Department
  - Department of Logistics - Technicals
  - Department of Reconnaissance
  - Department of Drug Prevention
  - Border Crossings Department
  - Office of the Command
  - 21st Signal Regiment
  - Border Guard Academy
  - Border Guard College
  - 24th Border Guard Intermediate Technical School
  - Northwest Training - Mobile Troop Center
- Border Guard Command of Provincial Military Command
  - Border Guard Posts
  - Border Gate Commands
  - Border Guard Flotillas

== Ranks ==
=== Commissioned officer ranks ===
The rank insignia of commissioned officers.

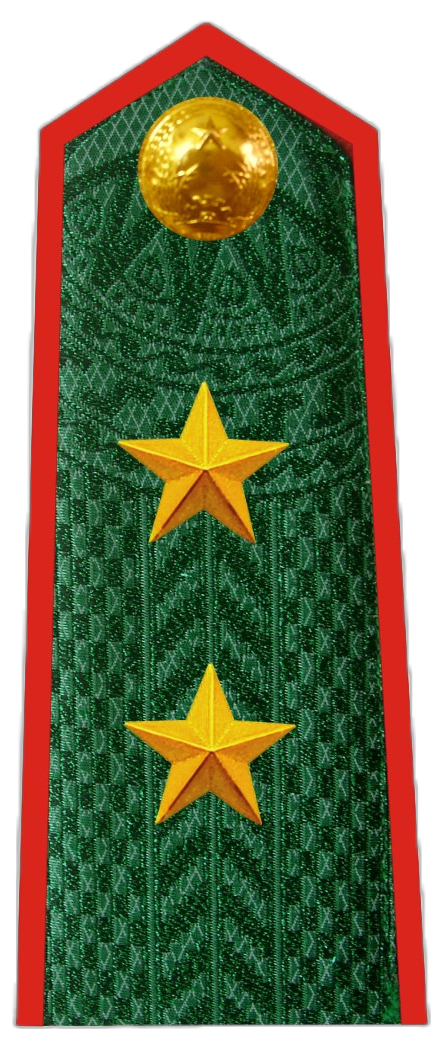
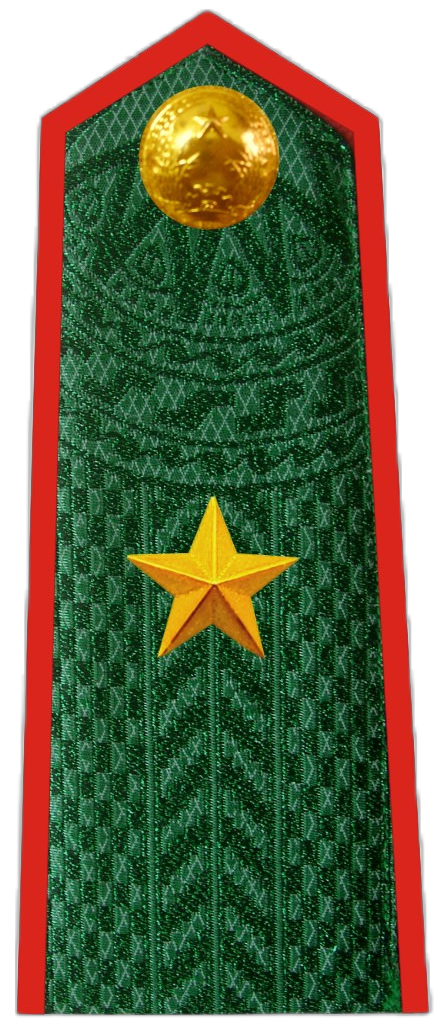
Rank group	General / flag officers		Senior officers				Junior officers
Vietnam Border Guard
Vietnam Border Guard	Trung tướng	Thiếu tướng	Đại tá	Thượng tá	Trung tá	Thiếu tá	Đại úy	Thượng úy	Trung úy	Thiếu úy

=== Other ranks ===
The rank insignia of non-commissioned officers and enlisted personnel.

Rank group	Senior NCOs		Junior NCOs	Enlisted
Vietnam Border Guard
Vietnam Border Guard	Thượng sĩ	Trung sĩ	Hạ sĩ	Binh nhất	Binh nhì

== Equipment ==
=== Personal equipment ===
Image	Name	Type	Origin	Note
Helmet
	Type A2 helmet	Combat helmet	Vietnam	Used in training and law enforcement activity
	Pith helmet	Helmet	Vietnam	Used in training
	PASGT helmet	Combat helmet	Vietnam	
Camouflage
	K20 Border Guard	Camouflage	Vietnam	Standard issue
	K20 Navy	Camouflage	Vietnam	Used by Border Guard flottila in naval border area

=== Unmanned Aerial Vehicle ===
Model	Image	Type	Variant	Quantity	Origin	Notes
VUA-SC-3G		Reconnaissance		3 UAV systems	Vietnam	Currently, the VUA SC-3G is being used by the Vietnam Border Guard.

=== Infantry weapons ===
Model	Image	Type	Variant	Caliber	Origin	Notes
Pistols
K14VN	Tokarev TT-33-IMG 6553-white	Semi-automatic pistol		7.62×25mm Tokarev	Vietnam	
TT-33	Tokarev TT33 (6825679152)	Semi-automatic pistol		7.62×25mm Tokarev	Soviet Union	
Type 54/K54		Semi-automatic pistol		7.62×25mm Tokarev	China Vietnam	
Assault rifles
AK-47		Assault rifle	AKMS AKM	7.62×39mm M43	Soviet Union Vietnam	
Galil ACE		Assault rifle		7.62×39mm	Israel Vietnam	
STV rifle	STV-022 STV-215 STV3801	Assault rifle	STV-022 STV-215 STV-380	7.62×39mm	Vietnam	Since 2022, the STV215/380 began to be officially equipped for the 10th Division, 3rd Corps (now the 34th Corps), following the model of a strong, uniformly equipped division. Subsequently, it was gradually equipped for units in the 12th Corps, infantry divisions in various military regions, and some border guard units.
Machine gun
PKM		General -purpose machine gun		7.62x54mmR	Soviet UnionVietnam	
RPD		Light machine gun	RPD-44 STrL-D	7.62×39mm	Soviet Union Vietnam	
DShK		Heavy machine gun	DShK-38 DShK 38/46	12.7×108mm	Soviet Union	

== Vehicle ==
=== Ground vehicles ===
Model	Image	Type	Variant	Quantity	Origin	Details
UAZ-469	Xe U-oát	Military light utility vehicle		2	Soviet Union	
KamAZ-43253	AJAS 1000	Military truck		4	Russia Vietnam	
Hyundai County	Viet Way JSC 30N 9357 (23222527100)	Utility Vehicle		2	South Korea	
ZIL-130		Military truck		4	Soviet Union	
KamAZ-43266		Military truck		1	Russia	

=== Patrol Vessels ===
Class	Image	Type	Ships	Origin	Quantity	Notes
Damen Stan Patrol 4207	NL,Z-H,G. Den Haag,Scheveningsehaven,Kustwacht entering the port	Patrol boat		Netherlands	4	Received from 2018 to 2019.
High-speed patrol boat		Patrol boat	BP 07-01-01	India	1	12 ordered. Designed by Larsen & Toubro. Five to built at Kattupalli Shipyard and seven by Hong Ha Shipbuilding.
MS-50S		Patrol vessels	BP 01–15–01, BP 20–15–01, BP 31–15–01, BP 57–15–03, BP-07-15-01, BP-08-15-01, BP-09-15-01, BP-33-15-01, BP-15-15-01, BP-19-15-01	Vietnam	23	The Technical Equipment Procurement Council of the Border Guard Command conducted technical acceptance testing and handed over these 13 boats at the end of November 2025.
CN-09		Patrol vessels	BP 14-19-01 BP 14-19-02 BP 02-19-01 BP 11-19-01 BP 30–19–01	Netherlands Vietnam	5	Ho Chi Minh City Border Guard received BP 14-19-01 and BP 14–19–02. Hai Phong Border Guard received BP 02–19–01. Phu Quy Port Border Guard Station received BP 11–19–01. Quang Tri Border Guard received BP 02–19–01.
Zhuk		Patrol vessel		Soviet Union	5	Used by flottila in Southern region
ST-112		Patrol vessel		Vietnam		Built by Hong Ha Shipbuilding and Ba Son Corporation.
ST-1740		Patrol vessel		Vietnam		Built by Hong Ha Shipbuilding, 1 was donated by Thái Bình province's Vietnam Fatherland Fornt branch.
BP-98		Patrol vessel		Vietnam		Built by Hong Ha Shipbuilding.

=== Search-and-rescue vessel ===
Class	Image	Type	Ship	Origin	Quantity	Note
CN-66		Search-and-rescue vessel		Vietnam	1	Also operated by Department of Search and Rescue of the General Staff of Vietnam Peolpe's Army

== Former ==
=== Infantry weapons ===
Model	Image	Type	Variant	Caliber	Origin	Note
Rifles
SVT-40		Semi-automatic rifle		7.62*54mm	Russia	
Submachie gun
PPSh 41/Type 50		Submachine gun		7.62*25mm	Russia/China	
Type 64		Submachine gun		7.62*25mm/9*19mm	China	
