= Plath GmbH =

German radio reconnaissance company

Plath Corporation GmbH
- Company type: GmbH
- Industry: Communication intelligence
- Founded: January 1, 1954; 72 years ago in Hamburg, Germany
- Founder: Maximilian Wächtler
- Headquarters: Hamburg, Germany
- Area served: International
- Key people: Nico Scharfe (managing director); Maya von Holdt (managing director); Michael Kalt (managing director)
- Services: Data-based early crisis recognition; Radio reconnaissance; Mass data analysis
- Revenue: EUR 110 million (2020)
- Website: www.plathgroup.com

Plath Corporation GmbH, previously known as C. Plath GmbH, is a German radio reconnaissance firm that specialises in data-based early crisis recognition. The Hamburg-based firm operates globally and has 12 subsidiaries which serve five business branches. Maximilian Wächtler, a German radio engineer, founded Plath Corporation GmbH as C. Plath GmbH in 1954. Previously, Wächtler had been the radio division's lead engineer of C. Plath KG – a different firm bearing the same name which dates back to the 19th century.

== Plath Group Structure ==
Plath Corporation GmbH is the Plath Group's main firm. It has several global subsidiaries that serve five business branches. On 1 April 2021, Plath GmbH & Co. KG and Plath Signal Products GmbH & Co. KG were spun off Plath Corporation GmbH.

- Plath Corporation GmbH
- Plath GmbH & Co. KG
- Plath Signal Products GmbH & Co. KG
- Innosystec GmbH
- Serpikom
- Plath AG
- Plath Singapore Pte Ltd
- Plath EFT GmbH
- testwerk GmbH
- Procitec GmbH
- Plath Ltd
- BitRecords GmbH

== Branches ==
Plath develops integrated systems for data-based early crisis recognition. In addition to that, Plath offers communication intelligence for both tactical and strategic applications, for which the firm develops sensor and data analysis technology.

Plath's five branches are structured as follows:

Systems & Integration

Systems & Integration is the Plath Group's Systems integrator. In addition to system integration, Systems & Integration offers operations' support.

Sensors

Plath's Sensors branch develops sensor technology for antennas, radiobearing, and radio receivers.

Signal Analysis & Signal Monitoring

Priotec GmbH develops Plath's signal analysis and signal monitoring technology. The firm's software is used in high-frequency, very-high-frequency, and ultra-high-frequency surveillance and analysis systems for tactical and strategic scenarios.

Radio Reconnaissance Software

Radio Reconnaissance Software offers software for both automatic and manual radio reconnaissance (ICAS), and software for strategic scenarios (COCKPIT), which allows combining multiple systems on a single platform.

Joint Intelligence Analytics

Plath's INNOSYSTEM GmbH develops the SCOPE software, which allows analysing large amaounts of data as well as collecting, analysing and correlating of information from various different sources on a single platform.

== History ==
=== Corporate history ===
==== Origin of the Plath name ====
In 1837, instrument maker David Filby from Husum established a shop for nautical instruments and maps in Hamburg. Carl Christian Plath bought Filby's shop in 1862. Plath, who owned a geodetic and mathematical instruments workshop, sold his workshop to Johann Christian Dennert the same year. This marked the foundation of Dennert & Pape Aristo-Werke. Carl Christian Plath was involved with several firms at the time, which resulted in several firms bearing his name, including Cassens & Plath, and C. Plath KG (the latter was founded in 1937).

==== C. Plath KG after World War II ====
In 1950, C. Plath KG established their radio engineering bureau at Hamburg's Kompasshaus (compass house) near the harbour. This engineering bureau was led by radio engineer Maximilian Wächtler, who is considered to be the inventor of radio reconnaissance and radio-based communications intelligence. C. Plath KG's managing director at the time was Johannes Boysen. Boysen and Wächtler started offering goniometer technology and CRT-based graphical radiobearing technology. Soon thereafter, C. Plath KG began specialising in radiobearing devices used in radio reconnaissance and radio monitoring. Eventually, their technology became so widespread that it resulted in a change in German marine legislation; starting in the late 1950s, radiobearing devices became mandatory equipment on German merchant craft. C. Plath KG radio devices were also used in aviation, civil radio service, and intelligence or military applications.

The first C. Plath KG device designed as a standalone device was their GPE 52 goniometer for marine angular positioning. This device was sold well into the 1970s. In the mid-1950s, it was decided that West Germany would join NATO in 1955, which resulted in a positive change in C. Plath KG's economical situation; their products were now sought-after, and the firm faced a steady demand. The income generated from the demand allowed Maximilian Wächtler to develop new radio technology, and eventually found his own radio firm, C. Plath GmbH.

==== Foundation of C. Plath GmbH ====
Maximilian Wächtler was not – despite leading the radio division's engineering bureau – an employee of C. Plath KG. Instead, he received a minor percentage of the firm's annual revenue. This allowed him to found C. Plath GmbH in April 1954 (the firm's foundation was predated to January that year). He received additional financial help from C. Plath KG's managing director Johannes Boysen. C. Plath GmbH is nowadays known as Plath Corporation GmbH, and is the firm that evolved into the Plath Group. Its first 14 staff originally consisted of C. Plath KG's radio division, and a Kiel-based signalling firm.

Maximilian Wächtler owned ten per cent of C. Plath GmbH; C. Plath KG and Atlas Elektronik (later incorporated into Fried. Krupp GmbH) owned forty-five per cent each. Joachim Pietzner and Fritz Dietz served as the firm's first managing directors. Wächtler had a five-year consulting contract with C. Plath GmbH. The firm had its first headquarters at Stubbenhuk 25 in Hamburg.

In 1962, C. Plath KG was incorporated into Litton Industries, which was later acquired by Northrop Grumman. In 1997 the company Sperry Marine was formed with the combination on C.Plath, Decca Marine and Sperry Gyrocompass.

==== First products in the 1950s ====
During the 1950s, C. Plath GmbH specialised in developing and designing special purpose devices and manufacturing them in small quantities. C.Plath GmbH devices that were better-suited for mass production were instead made at Atlas Elektronik in Bremen. This strategy allowed C. Plath GmbH to focus on both development and manufacture of high-quality products; the firm invested twelve per cent of its annual profits into research and development. In the late 1950s, C. Plath GmbH began developing very high frequency technology for aviation. Deutsche Bundespost was C. Plath GmbH's first wholesale customer.

In 1956, C. Plath GmbH had grown so much that their Stubbenhuk 25 headquarters had become too small. Thus, C. Plath GmbH moved to a new site at Hopfenmarkt 33 that had direct access to Hamburg's canal system. In 1958, C. Plath GmbH released the SPF500 optical radiobearing device that would later become standard equipment on almost all German merchant craft. As a result, C. Plath GmbH's economic situation was so good that they suffered no significant financial problem's from the North Sea flood of 1962.

==== Since the 1980s ====
In 1980, Fried Krupp GmbH (then owner of Atlas Elektronik) acquired fifty-one per cent of C. Plath GmbH's corporate capital, and transferred it back to their Atlas Elektronik subsidiary in 1983. In 1991, Bremer Vulkan became the majority owner of C. Plath GmbH, because they bought Atlas Elektronik from Fried. Krupp GmbH. Bremer Vulkan sold off their 51 percent of C. Plath GmbH's corporate capital to the Scharfe trading firm. C. Plath KG still owned 45 per cent of the corporate capital at the time. Maximilian Wächtler's family owned the remaining four per cent of the corporate capital.

By the late 1980s, C. Plath GmbH had become the global market leader in radio reconnaissance technology. In September 1987, Frankfurter Allgemeine Zeitung wrote that, even American radio equipment manufacturers had "nothing to offer that compared to C. Plath GmbH's products". Maximilian Wächtler died on 22 November 1988. C. Plath GmbH had obtained more than 300 patents by 1994.

After the Cold War had come to an end in the early 1990s, the economical situation changed for C. Plath GmbH. The firm began shifting its focus to digital radio reconnaissance technology and radio reconnaissance automation. By 2007, C. Plath GmbH's research and development department's staff consisted mainly of software engineers. The firm worked mainly for the public sector, but also for military clients and NATO-state intelligence services.

=== Historical products ===
Rotating frame radiobearing devices as well as cross frame goniometer devices were among C. Plath KG's first post World War II products. In the 1950s, C. Plath GmbH began offering UHF radiobearing devices. These products allowed C. Plath GmbH to dominate the German radiobearing market. In the early 1960s, C. Plath GmbH also offered compound location determination devices, optical radiobearing devices, goniometer radiobearing devices, rotating frame radiobearing systems, drum-type sextants, liquid, and ball-type compass devices, central compass devices, and gyrocompass units.

C. Plath GmbH's SFP 7000 Fidus optical radiobearing device saw widespread marine use throughout the 1980s. The device has three receiver channels with double frequency switching. In the 1990s, C. Plath GmbH developed mechanical and optical radiobearing devices for use in electronic warfare. In December 2020, C. Plath GmbH was renamed Plath Corporation GmbH.

== Fiscal and corporate data ==
In 1954, C. Plath GmbH began operating with 14 staff. In 1981, the firm had 145 staff; this number decreased to 115 in 1995. In 1994, C. Plath GmbH generated a revenue of DM 31 million. By 2007, the firm had 160 employees; by 2020, this number had increased to 404. That same year, Plath Corporation GmbH generated a revenue of EUR 110 million.
