= Military Honour Guard Battalion =

Main ceremonial battalion of the Vietnamese army

Honour Guard (Vietnamese: Đoàn Nghi lễ quân đội)
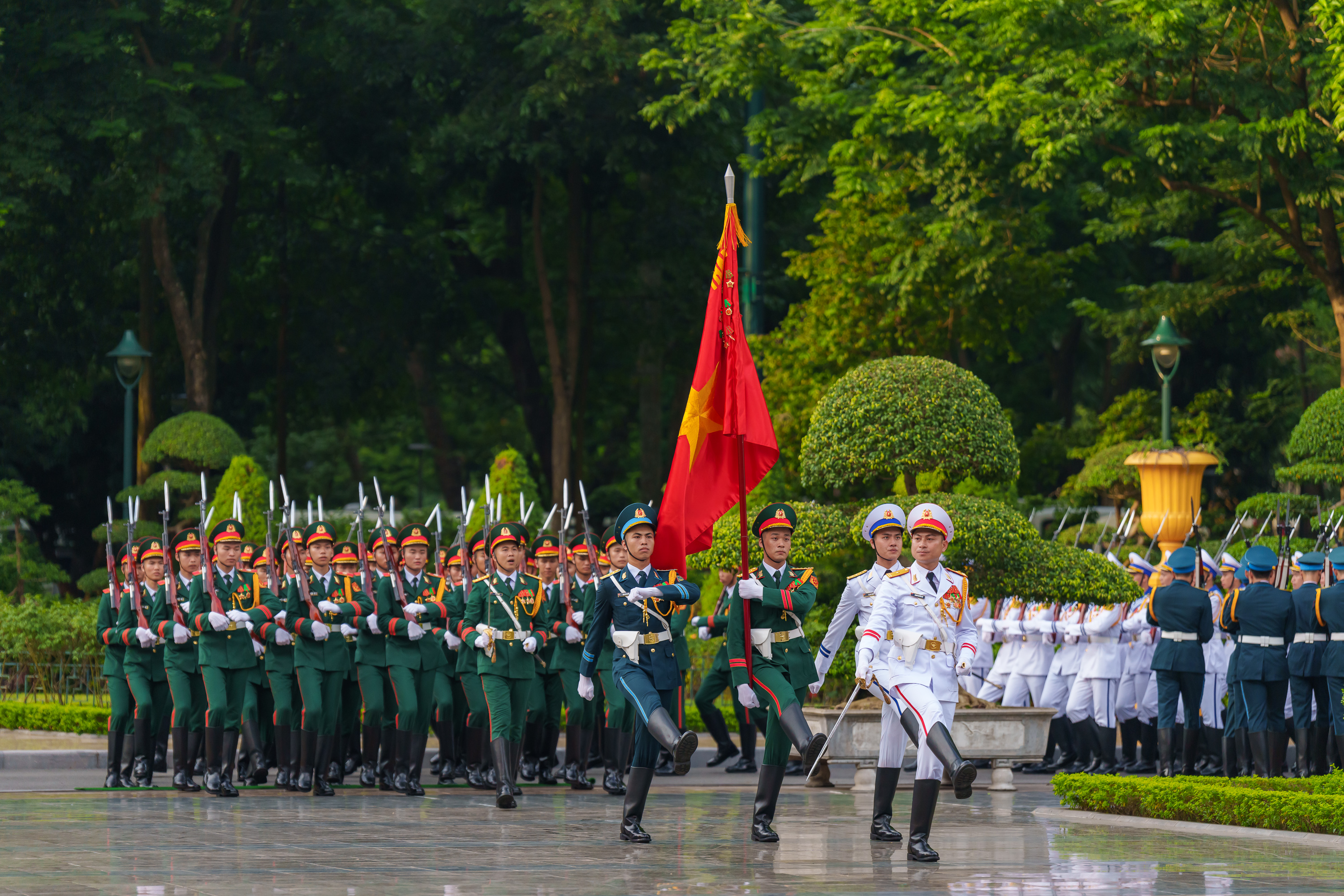
- Vietnamese Honour Guards - uniformed in tri-service - during Joe Biden's 2023 state visit to Vietnam.
- Active: 1944 – present
- Country: Vietnam
- Allegiance: President of Vietnam
- Branch: Vietnam People's Army
- Type: Guard of honour
- Role: Public duties
- Size: Battalion
- Part of: General Staff of the Vietnam People's Army
- Battalion Headquarters: Hanoi
- Motto(s): "Nghiêm trang, trọng thị khi đón khách, tận tình, chu đáo trong lễ tang"

The Military Honour Guard Battalion is the main ceremonial battalion of the Vietnam People's Army. The battalion was established on 1944, prior to the establishment of the Democratic Republic of Vietnam.

== Overview ==
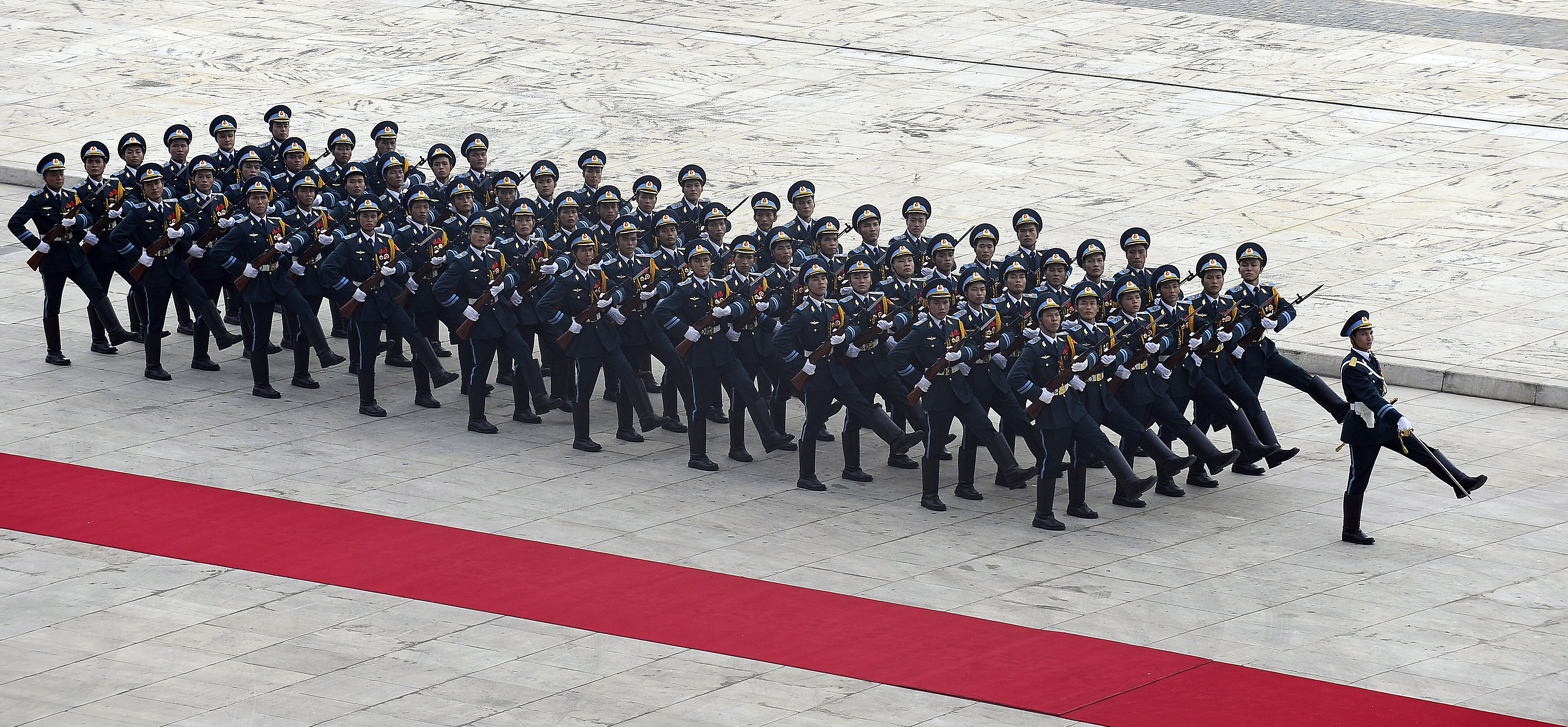
Members of the battalion conducting a troop review at the National Convention Center in Hanoi during the 16th ASEAN Summit in 2010.

The battalion has taken part in the welcoming of heads of state, heads of government, and senior government delegations, as well as taken part in functions related to the Communist Party of Vietnam, the state and the army. The battalion has also taken part in many national events, such as:

- National Day parade
- 6th ASEAN summit (1998)
- II ASEAN Para Games (2003)
- XXII Southeast Asian Games (2003)
- 5th ASEM summit (2004)
- 16th ASEAN Summit (2010)
- Millennial Anniversary of Hanoi (2010)
- 11th National Congress of the Communist Party of Vietnam (2011)
- 12th National Congress of the Communist Party of Vietnam (2016)
- 25th APEC summit (2017)

== Structure ==
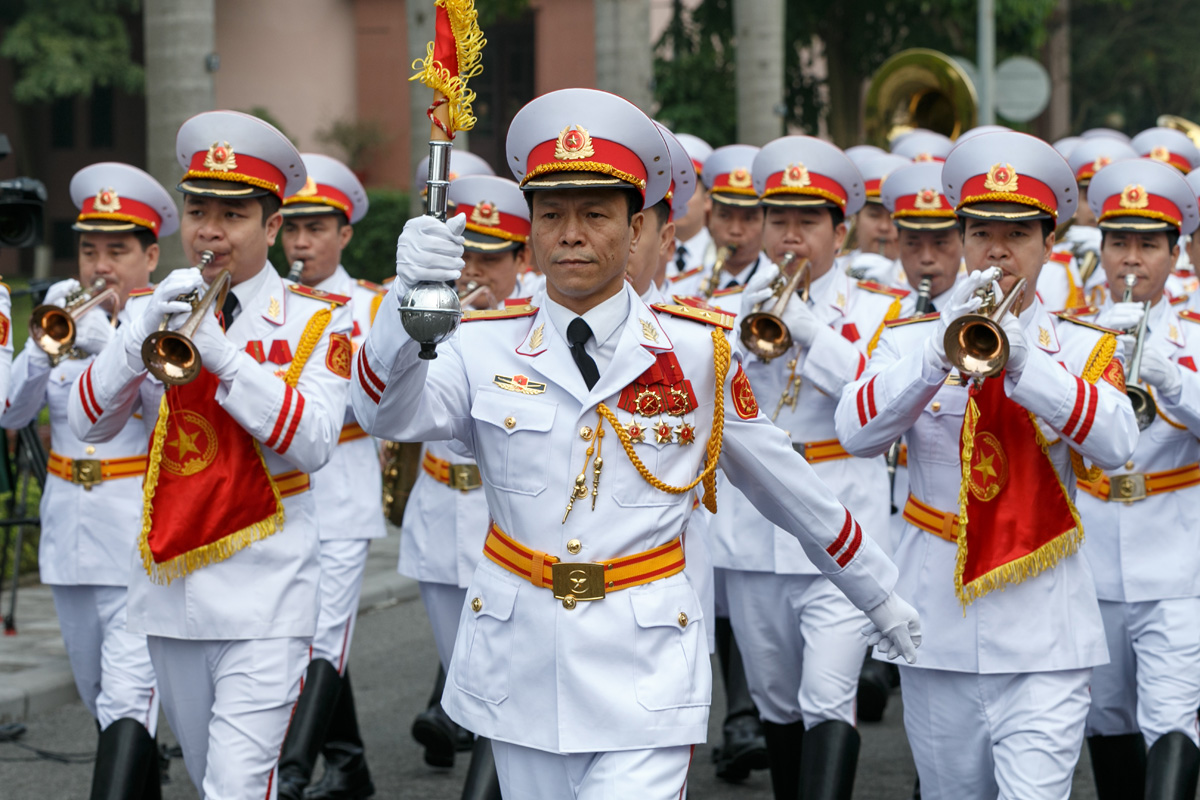
The military band

- General Staff Command: Provides honour guards during visits of foreign leaders, the National Day parade, remembrance days, and state funerals.
- Military Band of the General Staff Command: The band serves during ceremonial duties in connection with the battalion. It is the successor to the Liberation Army band commanded by Đinh Ngọc Liên, which on the day of the republic's founding in September 1945, performed during the Proclamation of Independence at Ba Đình Square and performing Tiến Quân Ca for the first time. Many members of the band studied at the Hanoi University School of Culture. The modern band was established in 1997, initially with only 9 musicians on the beginner level.

== Gallery ==
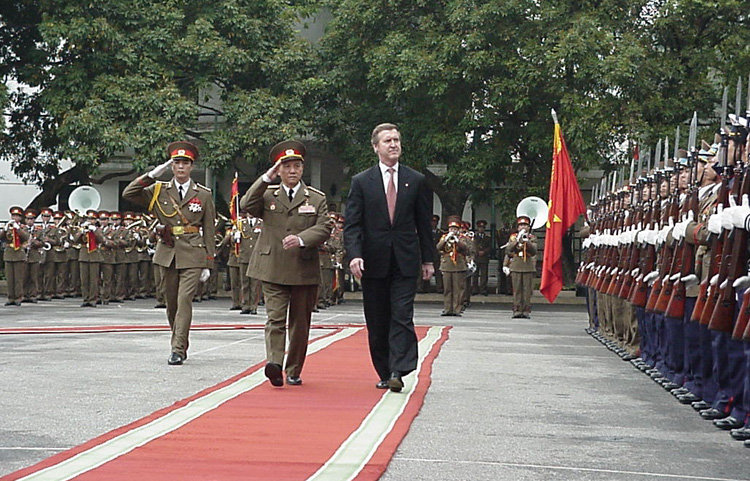

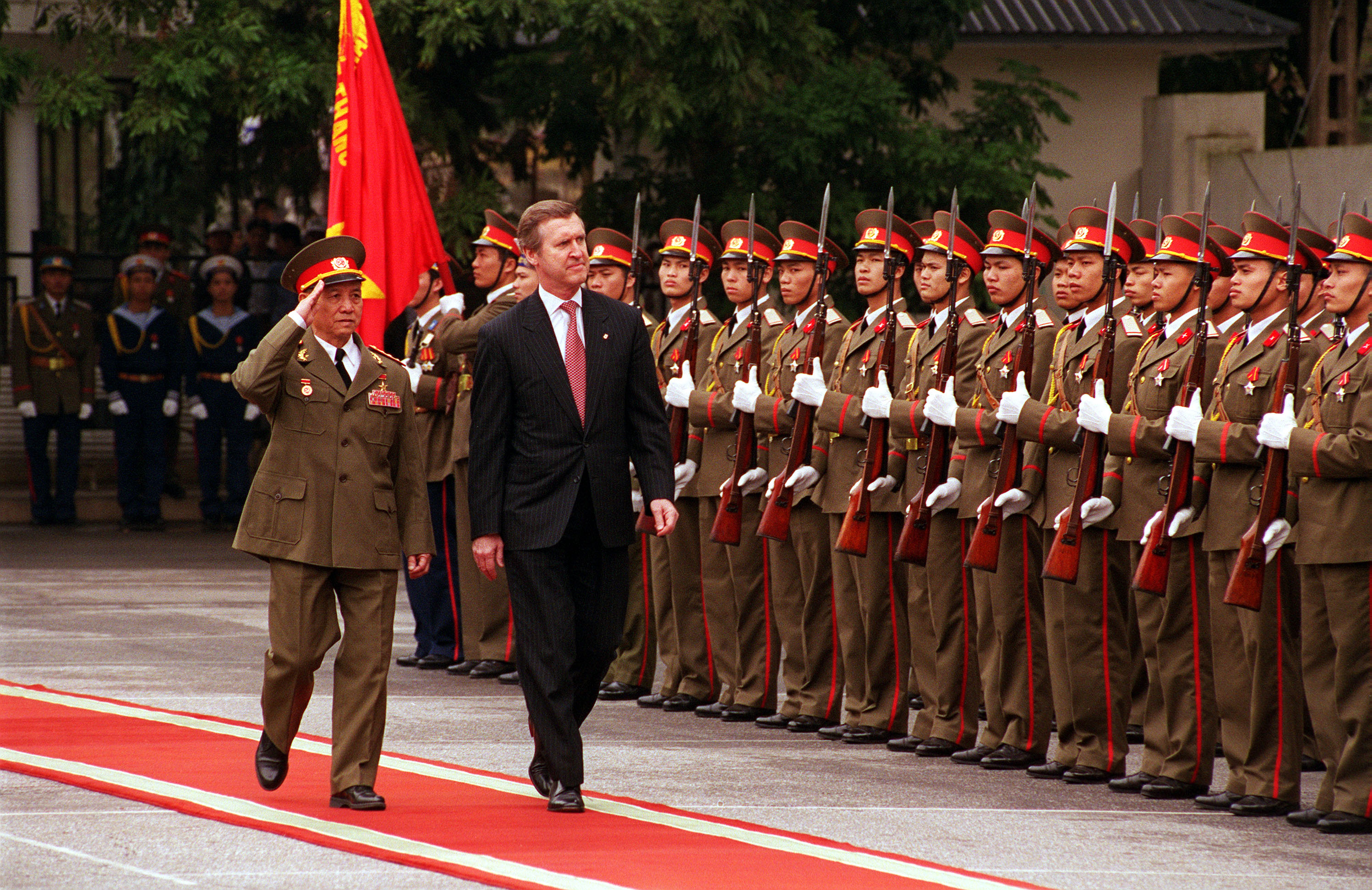

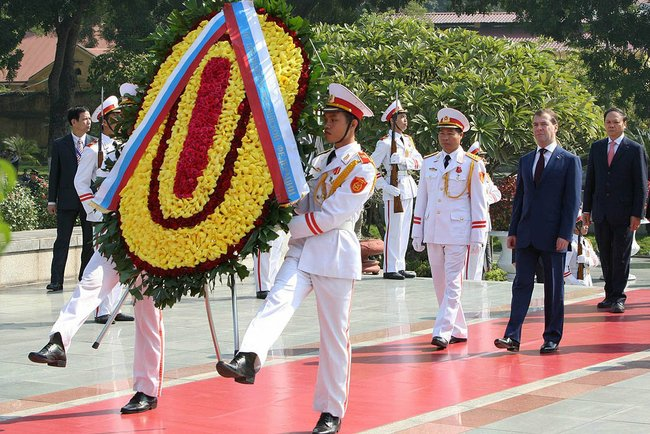

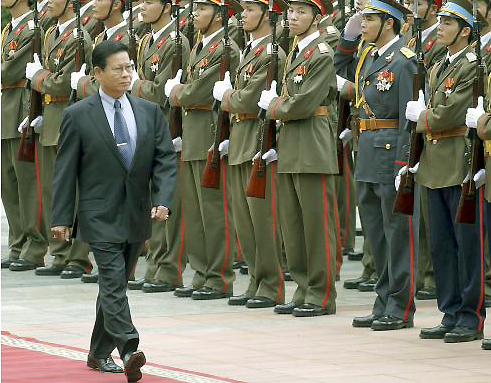

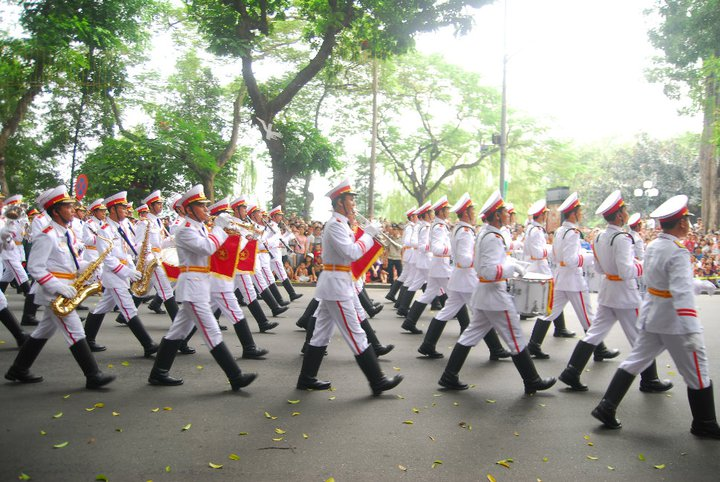
