= MAZ-538 =

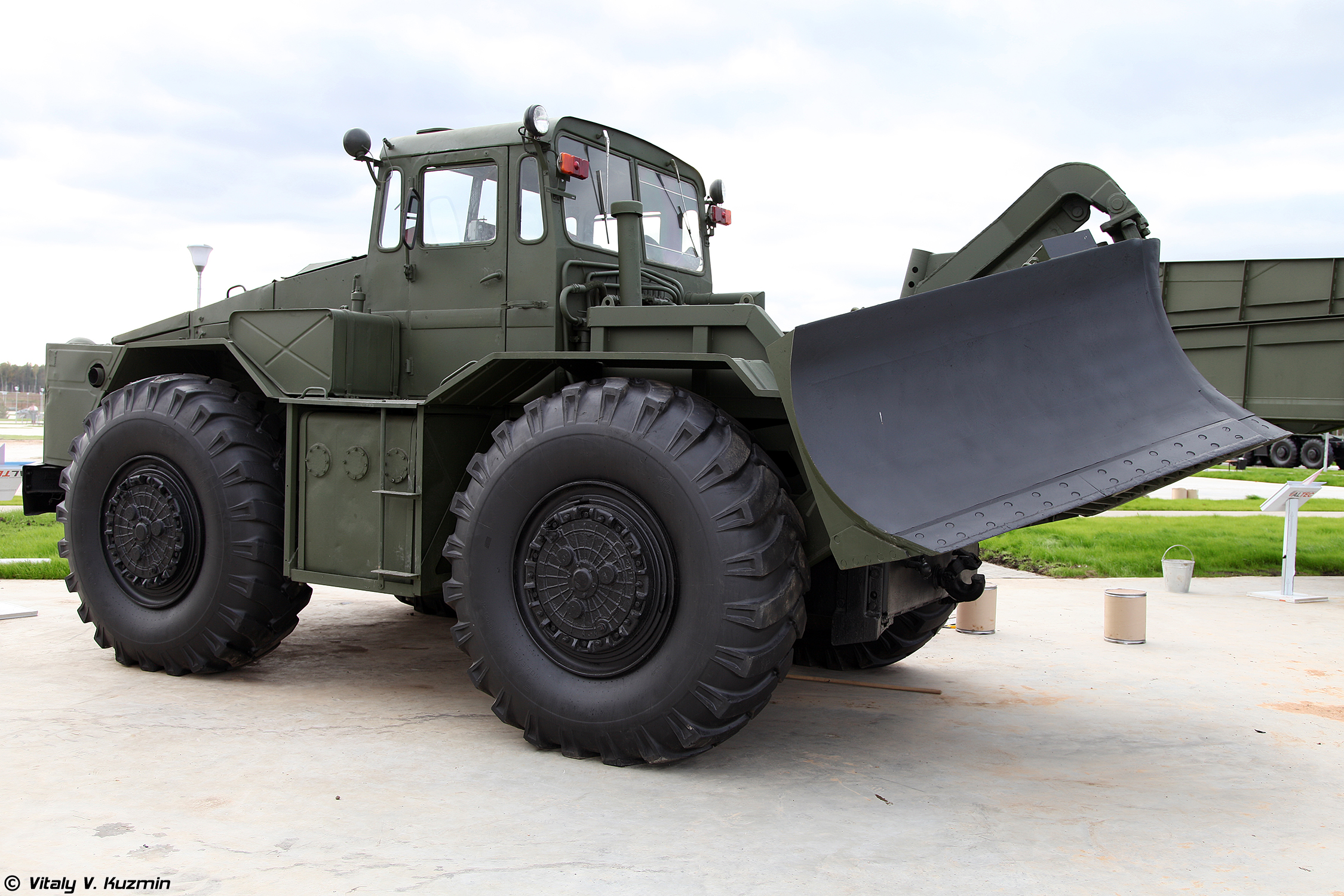

Overview
- Manufacturer: MAZ
- Production: 1955-1990

Body and chassis
- Body style: Bulldozer

The MAZ-538 (Russian: МАЗ-538) is a heavy four-wheeled bulldozer which was designed and built in the Minskyi Avtomobilnyi Zavod from the 1955 to 1990 model years, used for the Soviet armed forces. It was preceded by the prototype MAZ-528. Over the decades, various modifications have been made, some of which are still used today. Production was discontinued in 1990.

== History ==
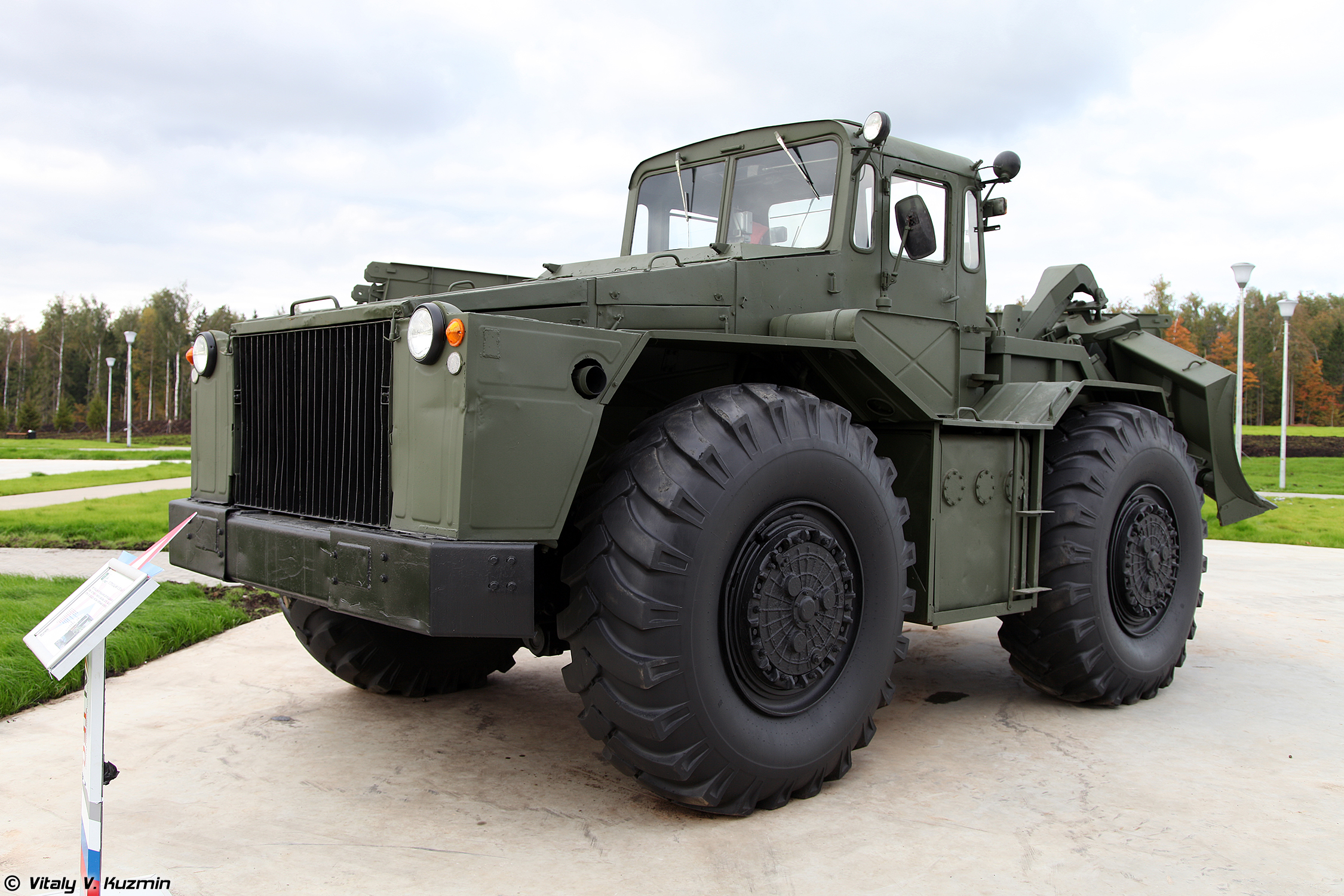
Front view

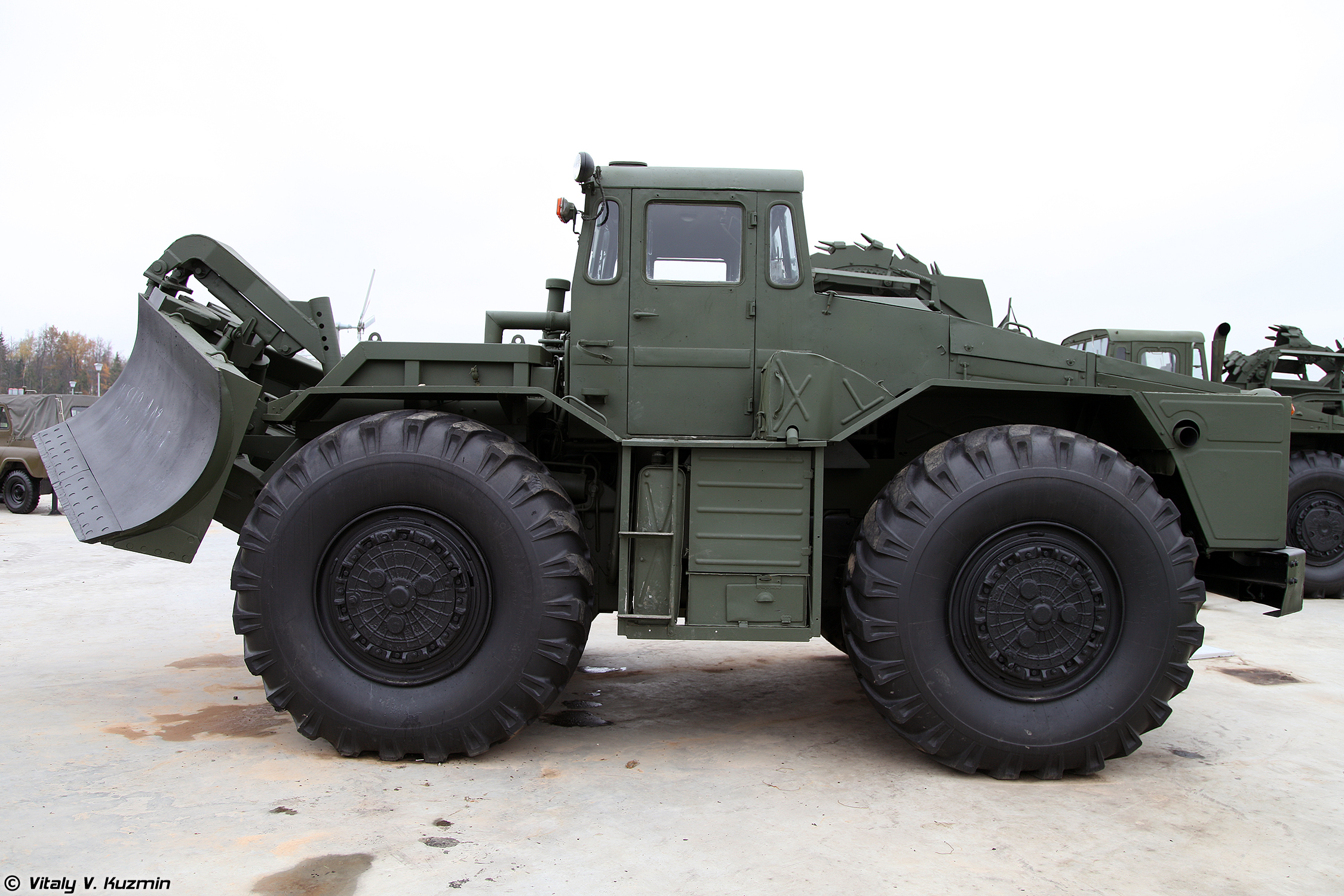
Side view

As early as 1955, a series of prototypes of a heavy wheeled bulldozer were built and tested, which at that time were still known as the MAZ-528. It is not clear exactly when the designation changed to MAZ-538, or why the change was made. However, it is known that the machines were manufactured from 1964 under the name MAZ-538 in series production.

As early as 1965, other factories began producing different variants of the vehicle. In contrast to the prototypes and the first models, this partly also happened outside the MAZ plant in secret/or even officially nonexistent armament companies like MZKT or KZKT. Various variants were made until the 1990s, often referred to with a three-letter combination such as BKT (Russian: БКТ) or PKT (Russian ПКТ) instead of MAZ-538. The KT stands for wheeled tractors (Russian: колесный тягач), the first letter for the specific application depending on attachments.

The various variants found a relatively large spread in the Soviet military as well as in the successor republics. Some copies are now exhibited in museums or continue in civilian use.

== Description ==
The vehicle stands on four equal-sized wheels with low-pressure tires. The rear wheels are steered in a similar way to a forklift truck. The bulldozer blade was designed in the early models in a characteristic V-shape, gradually replaced by a flat design. Later, it was decided to install additional equipment on the rear of the vehicle, such as pulling devices, rippers to loosen the ground, or large trenching machines. Depending on the version, the machine was operated by one or two people.

Power for both the machine and ancillary equipment comes from a V12 D12A-375 diesel engine, originally designed for tanks in World War II. The 38.8-litre engine produces 375 hp. In the course of the production history, there were attempts to enhance the performance with a 525 hp version, which was not proven for unknown reasons and was not pursued. All variants were equipped with four-wheel drive and designed specifically for longevity.

Over time, there was a tendency to make the machines bigger and heavier. Thus, in 1965, the wheelbase of the KZKT-538DP version ( Russian КЗКТ-538ДП ) was extended by more than a meter, in later models the curb weight was increased by almost 10 tonnes. Also the possible hourly performance was increased. Depending on their design, the previous machines were designed to move between 60 and 100 m^{3} of soil per hour. The last generation was designed for up to 160 m^{3} per hour.

== Technical data ==
(for the basic version)

- Engine: V12 diesel engine
- Engine type: D12A-375
- Displacement: 38.88 L
- Power: 276 kW (375 hp)
- Drive formula : (4×4)
- Fuel consumption: approx. 100 L / 100 km
- Fuel supply: 2× 240 L
- Top speed: 45 km/h
- Voltage of electrical system: 24 V

Dimensions and weights

- Length: 5870 mm
- Height: 3120 mm
- Width: 3100 mm
- Wheelbase: 3000 mm (later extended to 4200 mm)
- Ground clearance: 480 mm
- Track width: 2520 mm
- Curb weight: 16.5 tons
- Permitted total weight: up to 19.5 tons
