= A2 Helmet =

Combat helmet of the Vietnam People's Army

- Type: Combat Helmet
- Place of origin: Vietnam

Service history
- In service: 2010-Present
- Used by: Vietnam People's Army

The A2 Helmet is a standard issued combat helmet of the Vietnam People's Army introduced in 2010. Its main purpose is protection during training exercises and combat drills rather than actual combat scenarios.

== History ==
Up until 2014, a majority of the Vietnam People's Army were still using Pith Helmets. These Pith Helmets also saw significant use during the Vietnam War. Around 2014, the army began to mass-produce these A2 Helmets as a cost-effective replacement for older equipment in the army. They are now a standard issued helmet commonly used across all branches of the army.

== Design ==
The design of the helmet is similar to the PASGT without any Kevlar materials. The helmet is made of Polyamide Plastic and is designed with double-layered plastic cladding that are overlapped, foam lining, and mesh fabric on the inside.

Due to its non-bulletproof design, its mainly used as a helmet for training exercises and it can protect the user against explosive fragments.

They are commonly clothed with camouflage, or the camouflaged is directly painted on.
