= K20 (camouflage) =

Vietnamese camouflage pattern

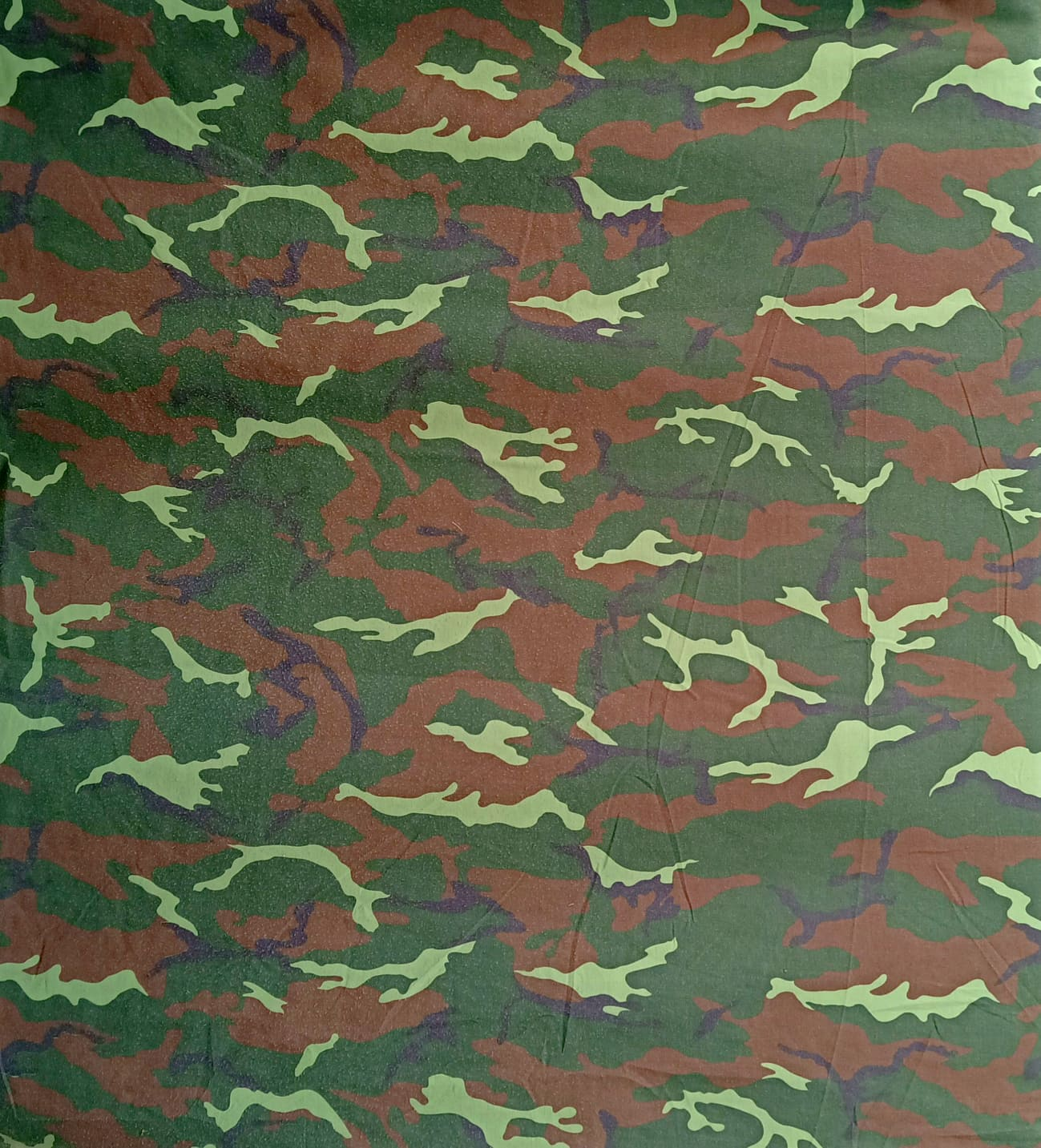
- K20 standard-issued camouflage for the Vietnamese Ground and Special Forces
- Type: Military camouflage pattern
- Place of origin: Vietnam

Service history
- In service: 2019

Production history
- Designer: X20 Factory
- Manufacturer: X20 Factory
- Produced: 2020-present
- Variants: See Variants

The K20 (Vietnamese: Kiểu 20, lit. 'Type 20'; largely referring the year 2020) is the standard camouflage pattern adopted by the Vietnam People’s Army. It was introduced to replace the previously widely used K17 and K07 patterns. The new camouflage was tested by the International Army Games 2019 team and put into service in 2020.

== History ==
=== Design ===
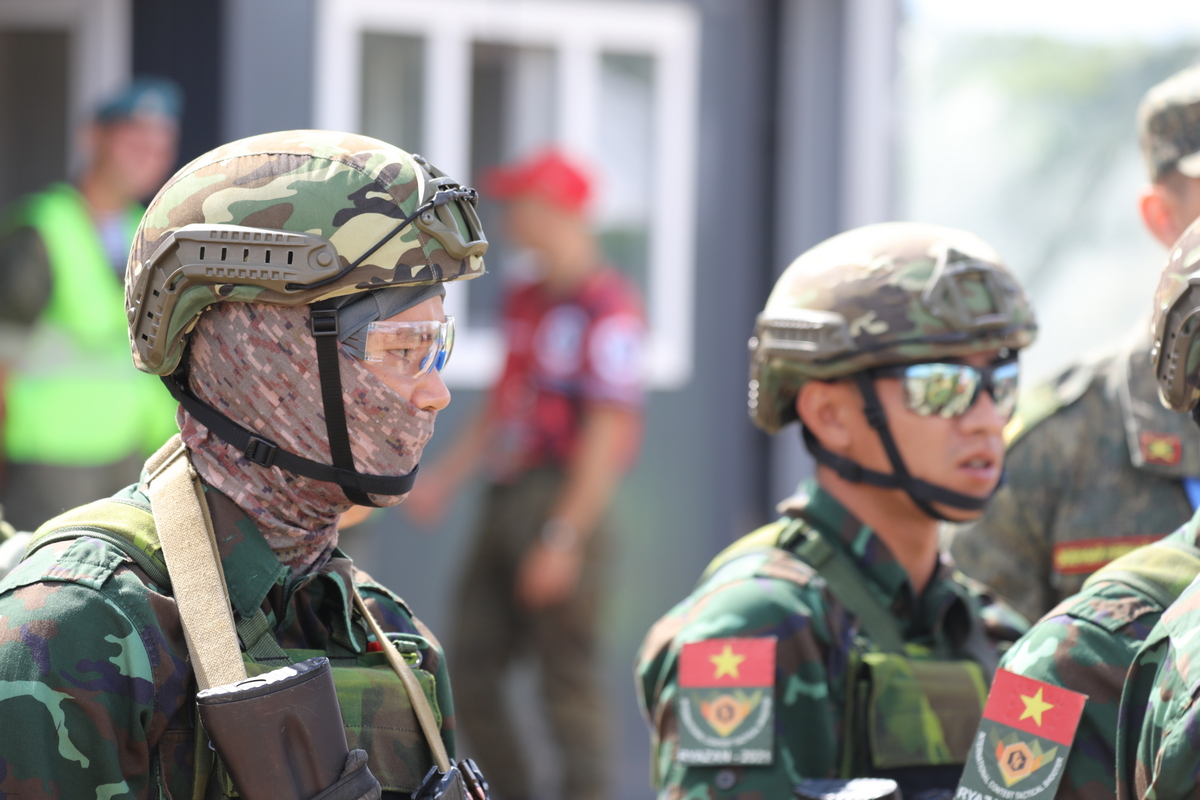
A Vietnam People’s Army soldier in K20 uniform

The K20 combat uniform is issued in five base colors, each tailored to the operational environment of the Vietnam People’s Army’s branches. Constructed from a durable, water-resistant gabardine.

Reinforced stitching at key stress points and low-profile tailoring ensure compatibility with body armor, tactical equipment, and modular accessories without restricting the soldier’s range of motion. The trousers have fastening loops at the hem and an integrated waist belt to provide a snug, secure fit that prevents snagging on vegetation or gear during rapid maneuvers. Sleeves are equipped with buttoned cuffs for a locked-in fit. The collar includes metal insignia holders that display branch and rank badges clearly.

Eight strategically placed pockets—two on the thighs, two on the hips, and four on the front of the jacket—enable soldiers to carry essential items such as maps, ammunition, and communication devices within easy reach.

A waist belt ensures the uniform fits to the body. Accessories include branch insignia, name tapes, and rank badges.

The uniform’s digital camouflage pattern features a micro-pixel layout based on an ERDL pattern, with color schemes drawn from Vietnam’s natural landscapes. This advanced patterning provides enhanced concealment at varying engagement ranges, breaking up the wearer’s silhouette against diverse backdrops. Dots and star-shaped pixels are finer than previous Type 07 digitals, further improving stealth capabilities.

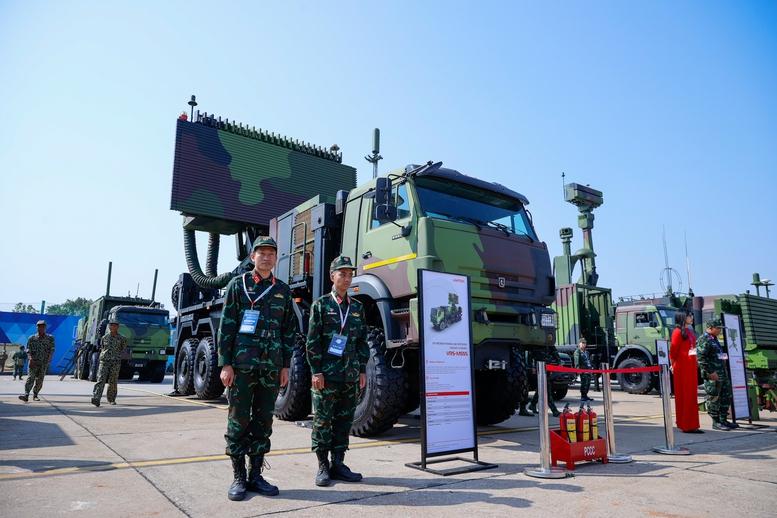
Vietnamese personnel with K20 uniforms during the 2024 Vietnam Defence Expo.

=== Fielding ===
The K20 pattern will be the standard across equipment such as combat helmet, tactical vests, kepi caps, load-bearing jackets, and military boots.

== Variants ==
Five variants of pattern for K20 camouflage is available for five branches of the army.
Ground Force	Air Force	Navy/ Border Guard flottila	Border Guard	Coast Guard
Brown and jungle green colored digital camouflage.	Olive and light blue colored digital camouflage.	Brown and dark blue colored digital camouflage.	Dark grey and jungle green digital camouflage.	Dark grey and dark blue colored digital camouflage.

Other variants introduced in the Vietnam 80th National Day Parade
Cyber Warfare Command	Engineer Corps	Medical Corps	Airborne Recon

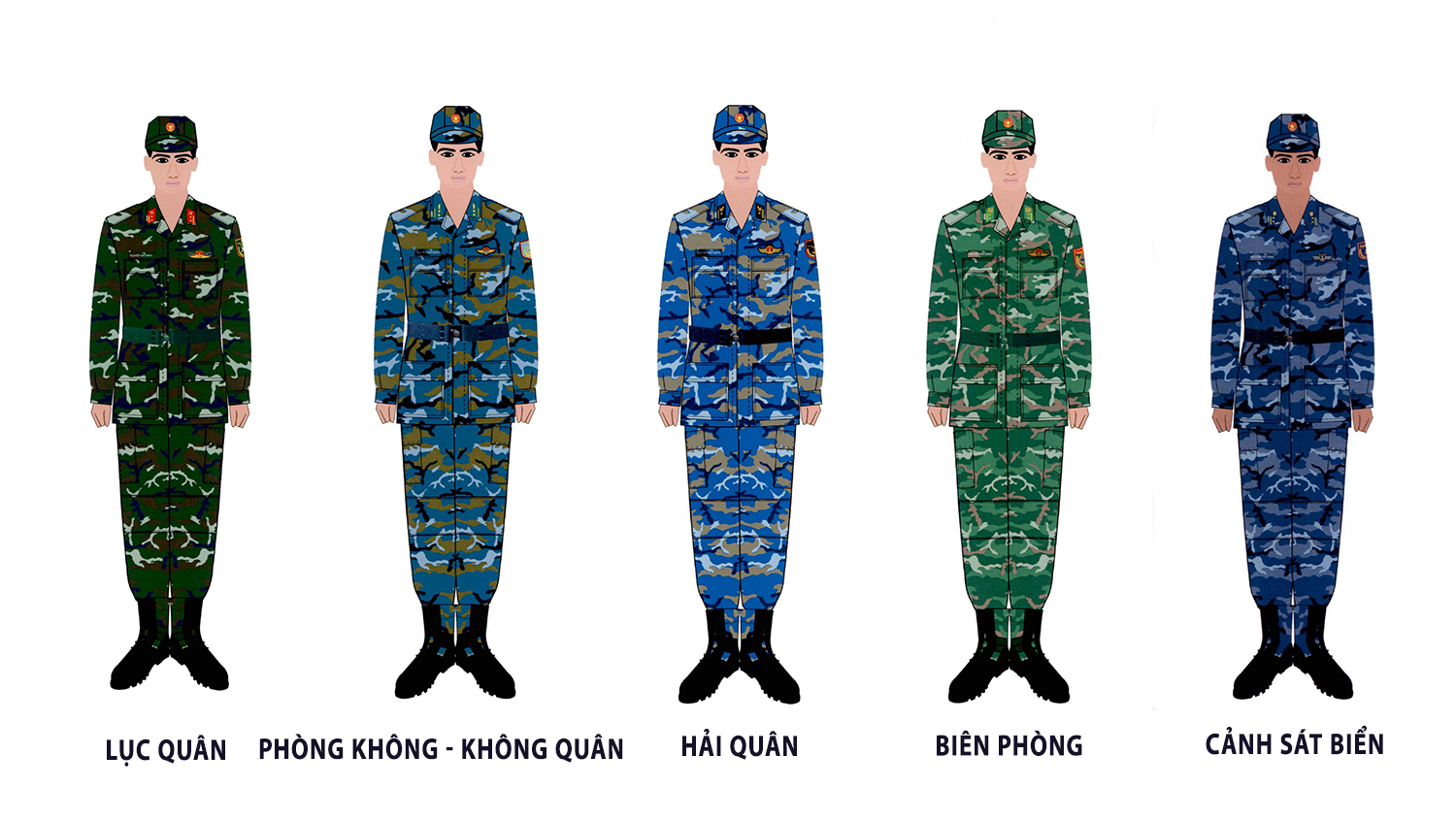
Combat uniforms of the Vietnamese Army with their corresponding color schemes: Ground Force (combined arms), Air Defence - Air Force, Navy, Border Guard and Coast Guard.
