= Syndicate (disambiguation) =

A syndicate is a self-organizing group formed to transact some business or promote a common interest.

Syndicate may also refer to:

== Entertainment ==
=== Video games ===
- Syndicate (series), a series of computer games
  - Syndicate (1993 video game), the first game in the above series
  - Syndicate: American Revolt, a 1993 expansion set for Syndicate
  - Syndicate Wars, the second game in the above series
  - Syndicate (2012 video game), a series reboot
- Assassin's Creed Syndicate, the ninth main installment in the Ubisoft series of video games

=== Music ===
- "Syndicate" (song), a 2008 song by The Fray
- Syndicate (album), a 2025 album by The Midnight

=== Other ===
- Syndicate (The X-Files), an organization in the television series The X-Files
- Syndicate (TV series), a 2022 Bangladeshi TV series
- Syndicate (group), an Australian rock group

== People ==
- Syndicate (gamer), the moniker of internet personality Tom Cassell

== Places ==
- Syndicate, Indiana, a town in the United States
- Syndicate, Queensland, a locality in the Shire of Douglas, Queensland, Australia

== See also ==
- Syndic, an officer of government
- Syndication (disambiguation)
- The Syndicate (disambiguation)
