= MT Orkim Harmony hijacking =

2015 hijacking of Malaysian tanker in South China Sea

- Part of Piracy in the Strait of Malacca and Piracy in Indonesia
Date	11–19 June 2015
Location	Lost in the waters of Tanjung Sedili, Kota Tinggi, Johor, Malaysia 9.10°N 103.10°E
Result	Hijack foiled: Australia spotted the tanker in the Gulf of Thailand; Malaysia recovered the tanker and rescued all 22 crewmembers.; Vietnam captured all eight escaping pirates after they were found intruding past the Vietnamese border

Belligerents
Malaysia: Royal Malaysian Navy; Royal Malaysian Air Force; Malaysian Maritime Enforcement Agency; Australia: Royal Australian Air Force; Vietnam: Vietnam Border Guard; Vietnam Coast Guard; Other aid/standby forces: Indonesia: Indonesian Navy; Thailand: Royal Thai Navy	Indonesian pirates

Commanders and leaders
Abdul Aziz Jaafar; Ahmad Puzi; Adam Steff; Peter Knox; Doãn Bảo Quyết; Nguyễn Quang Đạm; Ngô Ngọc Thu	Ruslan (surrendered)

Strength
1,500 strong team, 16 ships and four aircraft AP-3C Orion surveillance aircraft 4 ships	1 tanker 8 pirates 1 lifeboat

Casualties and losses
None	8 captured
- 1 hostage injured
- Approximate location where the tanker was found on 19 June. (Note: The reference is on the external links.)

On 11 June 2015, eight Indonesian pirates hijacked the MT Orkim Harmony, a Malaysian tanker, in the South China Sea. The crew and the tanker were freed and recovered on 19 June near the southwest of Phú Quốc in Vietnam with the joint efforts of Royal Malaysian Navy, Royal Malaysian Air Force, Malaysian Maritime Enforcement Agency, Royal Australian Air Force, Vietnam Border Guard, Vietnam Coast Guard, Indonesian Navy and Royal Thai Navy.

== Background ==
Before the hijacking of MT Orkim Harmony, another oil tanker named MT Orkim Victory was hijacked by eight Indonesian pirates armed with two hand guns and a parang on 4 June in the South China Sea. The hijackers took the tanker to around 12.2 nautical miles off Aur Island where they pumped the oil (about 770 metric tonnes of diesel) into another tanker before releasing the Orkim Victory. The pirates damaged all communication equipment and robbed the crew members of their personal belongings. All the pirates managed to escape unhurt.

== Hijacking ==
Communication with MT Orkim Harmony was lost on 11 June at 8:54 p.m. MST (UTC+08:00) during its way from Malacca to Kuantan Port in the waters of Tanjung Sedili, Kota Tinggi, Johor at 2°8.90′N 104°27.30′E. During the hijack, a crew of 22 was on board the tanker including 16 Malaysians, five Indonesians and one Myanmar national. The tanker was loaded with 6,000 metric tonnes of petrol worth around 21 million ringgit (US$5.6 million). All the eight hijackers were armed with pistols and parangs.

== Searching operations ==
On 12 June, the Malaysian Maritime Enforcement Agency (MMEA) started to search for the tanker in South China Sea in an area of 50,000 square kilometres after it lost contact for 10 hours. Malaysian authorities believed the tanker could have been hijacked and taken to nearby Indonesian islands of Natuna and Anambas. On 17 June, a Royal Australian Air Force AP-3C Orion reconnaissance aircraft, flying from RMAF Butterworth in Malaysia's northern Penang state, spotted the missing tanker in the Gulf of Thailand within the Cambodian-Vietnamese maritime border. According to them, the tanker had been repainted from blue to black and renamed Kim Harmon. However, the Royal Cambodian Navy could not confirm the reports and gave a green light for joint operation with Malaysia to track and intercept the tanker in Cambodian waters. The MMEA then contacted the Vietnam Coast Guard (VCG) to inform the news and, upon receiving the information, the VCG deployed two patrol ships to the area. Both the Malaysian and Royal Thai Navy (RTN) were also put on standby. Subsequent information by the VCG reported that the tanker was located at 9°21′N 102°44′E approximately 84 nm southwest of Phú Quốc in Vietnam.

== Aftermath ==
In reaction to the Australian report, Royal Malaysian Navy (RMN) and MMEA vessels, who were put on standby, were deployed to the area and, on 19 June, the tanker was spotted at 9°10′N 103°10′E. The pirates on board the tanker instructed them to retreat for about five nautical miles (9 kilometres) from the tanker, and threatened to kill the crew's families if the tanker's captain leaked the pirates' plan to leave the tanker to the Malaysian authorities. The pirates also were "practically begging" the Malaysian authorities to let them go and continue their "journey" until they reached Natuna Island. After some negotiations, all the pirates managed to escape on an Orkim's rescue lifeboat. The RMN and MMEA successfully secured the tanker at 12:50 a.m. MST, with all members of the crew in safe condition except for one person who was injured in his thigh after being shot by the pirates.

Some hours later, eight Indonesians who were suspected as the pirates were seen near Thổ Chu Island and as they were approached by the Vietnam Border Guard (VBDF) and VCG, the Indonesians claimed they were from a fishing boat that sank. The MMEA then started an investigation on the matter and co-operating with the Vietnamese government through the Attorney-General's office and the Foreign Affairs Ministry to bring all the suspects to Malaysia. The eight were confirmed to be the hijackers after being identified by the injured crew, who were shown photographs of the men, as well with the pirates' confession during interrogation by Vietnamese authorities when they were shown images and information provided by Malaysian authorities. Malaysian Prime Minister Najib Razak and Home Minister Ahmad Zahid Hamidi expressed their gratitude to all parties involved in ensuring the safe release of all 22 crew members and the capturing of pirates. They also submitted a request for extradition of the hijackers to Malaysia from Vietnam and Indonesia.

Further investigation by Vietnamese authorities concluded that the pirates were not amateurs, but "seasoned criminals" based on how they conducted their motives by switching off Automatic Identification System (AIS) to operate their crime undetected and how they were found with wads of cash on their lifeboat when detained by VBDF and VCG. MMEA's investigation also revealed that there are another five perpetrators (bringing the total to 13) who were involved in the hijacking by using a tugboat to approach the tanker and that all of them had escaped to Batam, Indonesia where the tugboat was found by the Indonesian navy on 21 June. The tugboat has been identified as Meulaboah and was found abandoned near Seloko Island off Batam by the Indonesian Navy's Western Fleet Command's (KOARMABAR) Quick Response team. Eight pirates who had been caught earlier in Vietnam has admitted the tugboat was used as their transportation. On 31 August, KOARMABAR arrested the alleged mastermind known as Albert Yohanes who living in an apartment in Grogol Petamburan, West Jakarta, Indonesia. The MMEA has been informed over the arrests and will send a representative to help Indonesian authority to solving the case.

On 12 September 2016, after almost a year after the incident, the Vietnamese high court finally approved the Malaysian request for extradition, while rejecting a similar request from the Indonesian government. On 27 November, all suspects arrived on Senai International Airport of Johor through a special chartered flight by MMEA from an airport in Hanoi. The Malaysian court sentenced all suspects to 15 and 18 years in prison with all pleading guilty.

== See also ==
- MT Zafirah hijacking
