= Syndication =

Syndication is to publish or broadcast media content through multiple outlets, such as:

- Broadcast syndication, of programs to other networks
- Print syndication, of printed material to other publishers
- Web syndication, of web feeds to other sites
- Search syndication, of keyword searches
- Syndicated loan, made by a group of banks
- Really Simple Syndication, Web news feeds

== See also ==
- Syndic
- Syndicate
- Syndicate (disambiguation)
- Wikipedia:Syndication
