= MT Zafirah hijacking =

2012 piracy incident in the South China Sea

- Part of Piracy in the Strait of Malacca and Piracy in Indonesia
- Cutter CSB 4034 of the Vietnam Marine Police (now became Vietnam Coast Guard) approached the suspected vessel.
Date	18–22 November 2012
Location	Lost near the waters of Natuna Islands, Indonesia 9.50°N 107.19°E
Result	Vietnamese victory: All eight tanker crews rescued; Hijack foiled and all eleven pirates arrested; Malaysian tanker recovered

Belligerents
Vietnam Vietnam Coast Guard Vietnam People's Navy	(Indonesia) Indonesian pirates

Commanders and leaders
Nguyễn Quang Đạm; Lê Xuân Thành; Lê Hải Trường; Nguyễn Tuấn Hải	(Indonesia) Unknown (surrendered)

Strength
3 ships (Vietnam) 2 ships (Vietnamese civil fishing vessels)	1 tanker 11 pirates

Casualties and losses
none	11 captured
- none
- Approximate location where the tanker was recovered (Note: The reference is on the external links.)

On 18 November 2012, eleven Indonesian pirates hijacked MT Zafirah, a Malaysian tanker, in the South China Sea. The tanker crew was left by the pirates on a lifeboat in the sea two days after the hijacking but were subsequently rescued by Vietnamese fishing vessels on 21 November when their lifeboat was drifting around 118 nautical miles in the waters off Vietnam's southern Bà Rịa–Vũng Tàu province. All the pirates managed to be tracked by Vietnam Coast Guard and Vietnam People's Navy with information provided by Malaysian based International Maritime Bureau and Singaporean based RECAAP, which led to their arrest after a brief of standoff near Vũng Tàu port.

== Background ==
The tanker was carrying 320,173 litres of light crude oil from Pasir Gudang, Johor, West Malaysia to Miri, Sarawak, East Malaysia when it was reportedly missing. Around five Myanmar nationals and four Indonesians were on board the tanker.

== Hijacking ==
MT Zafirah was hijacked near the Natuna Islands, Indonesia. Around 19–20 November, the tanker was seen heading in a northerly direction with the last communication recorded at about 174.4 nautical miles (7°10.16′N 109°9.29′E) southeast of Côn Sơn Island, Vietnam. RECAAP reported that all the 11 pirates were armed with machetes and pistols, and might be trying to sell the oil illegally in Vietnam. A report received by the Vietnam Coast Guard (VCG) stated that a company called "Petimax" will receive the oil from the tanker. All the tanker crew were later found on a lifeboat after having been left drifting in the sea for two days by the hijackers. They were subsequently rescued by Vietnamese fishing vessels.

== Searching operations ==
Shortly after being reported missing, the Kuala Lumpur-based International Maritime Bureau informed the incident to the VCG. At around 10:06 am (UTC+07:00), the Singapore-based RECAAP reported that the latest position of the tanker was located in Vietnamese waters and that the tanker is moving at 10 nautical miles an hour. Some 24 hours after the report, the VCG was informed that the operators of the tanker had managed to anchor at a port in Vietnam to unload cargo. The VCG departed two ships along with another one on its way to the area when the tanker was detected 45 nautical miles east-southeast of Côn Đảo Island. At around 2:30 am (UTC+07:00), two Vietnamese authorities vessels arrived at the site where the hijacked tanker was reportedly expected to arrive. When they spotted a suspicious tanker in the area, the VCG turned their lights to the tanker cabins but the crews on the tanker refused to respond. The VCG then tried to establish a contact with the suspicious tanker but still no response was received. After repeatedly trying to contact them, the suspicious crew on board gave inconsistent replies, saying they were on their way to China, then later that they were en route to Singapore. The VCG then ordered them to drop anchor.

== Aftermath ==
After ordering the tanker to stop, the VCG found that the tanker's name was MT Sea Horse with a flag of Honduras. However, the VCG noticed strange paint on the tanker. Their suspicions were confirmed by earlier reports from MT Zafirah's captain that the tanker had been hijacked by 11 men, who were likely Indonesians; along with a report from the Piracy Reporting Centre in Malaysia that it had found no cargo vessel named the MT Sea Horse in its archives. The VCG ordered the tanker to be taken offshore for identification. After two days keeping the suspected tanker at anchor, at 3:00 pm (UTC+07:00) the suspicious crew on board the tanker suddenly started their engine. One of them were seen trying to cut the anchor in their bid to escape while another one contacted the VCG from the tanker and said "We are about to leave Vietnamese waters immediately". As a reaction, the VCG were ordered to shoot at the rooftop of the tanker's bridge. After a series of gunshots, the suspicious crew reduced the tanker's speed but still refused to leave the tower despite being told to do so. The VCG tried again to repeat the order and told them to surrender but as they were reluctant to do so, the VCG continued firing with 12.7mm machine guns and assault rifles, while considering destroy the ship with the Coast Guard's 25mm autocannons if necessary. All the suspicious crew members began crawling out of the control tower to the prow to surrender, while the VCG counted all 11. The VCG noticed at the earlier reports that there are around 12 perpetrators and began to fear that one hijacker was still hiding in the tanker and could try to explode himself along with the tanker. The VCG threatened to shoot four of them at the prow if the remaining suspect refused to appear. When a gunshot was fired into the air, all the perpetrators cried and shouted that they were only 11 strong. Five motor boats were then sent to approach the tanker and all of them were ordered to jump into the water. Within 50 minutes since the first gunshot, all 11 perpetrators were tied up and brought into one of the Vietnamese vessels. All of them were later confirmed as the hijackers. At the end of the successful mission, Major General Nguyễn Quang Đạm was quoted in a statement about the situation;

We heard the pirates are with dangerous objects, good weapons and had seen them act in wrongful deeds. The process of the arrest may be the worst case scenario to happen, the danger to the lives of cadres, soldiers and destruction of property. There are no close combat plans to implement, if we had made a mistake it may lead to a fire and the explosion will cause an oil spill, pollution, environmental destruction to the sea, and as a consequence to that other lives near the areas could be in danger.

On 13 April 2013, approximately four and a half months after the incident, all the pirates were escorted to Tan Son Nhat International Airport in Ho Chi Minh City for an extradition to Indonesian authorities.

== See also ==
- MT Orkim Harmony hijacking
