= Search syndication =

Type of contextual advertising

Search syndication is a type of contextual advertising which allows online search advertisers to buy keyword-targeted traffic outside of search engine results pages. This is considered to be an alternative to advertising on search engines, since 43% of all searches occur outside of the top search engines.

Although search syndication falls under the umbrella of contextual advertising, they are not synonymous because contextual advertising also includes display ads while search syndication focuses on text ads sold on a pay per click basis.

== Overture, Yahoo and Microsoft ==
Search syndication was originated by Herman Tumurcuoglu at Montreal Meta Search Company Mamma.com in 1999. Beginning as a relatively unknown aspect of search engine marketing (SEM), Overture expanded the practice before it was acquired by Yahoo.com. In 2011, Microsoft formed an alliance with Yahoo to support SEM through its adCenter platform across its properties, however in the realm of search syndication, the two competed for direct deals with publishers. Forty percent of the alliance’s traffic (about five billion queries per month) comes from search syndication. Industry analysts now estimate that Yahoo has the most syndication partners—between 1,200 and 1,500—that request ads through its XML feeds.

Yahoo’s 2011 fourth quarter revenue was $1.3 billion, a 13 percent decrease from 2010 Q4.

== Google ==
Google currently has the largest search syndication network. It adopted search syndication when it rolled out AdSense for Feeds in 2005, to address the fact that it had more advertisers than user queries to its search engine. To find additional traffic for these advertisers, Google began showcasing search ads on third-party sites across the web. These syndication partners include other search engines (including metasearch engines and downloadable toolbars), media sites and retail sites. Historically, the network also included domain parking sites, which Google removed from the Search Partner Network on 10 February 2026.

In fourth quarter 2011, Google earned $8.13 billion from search syndication (missing analysts’ forecast of $8.38 billion).

== Criticism ==
Like traditional contextual advertising, syndication networks comprise multiple publishers. Unlike a search results page, however, this means the quality of the traffic varies by ad placement.

Some Internet marketers have accused search engines of not being transparent about their syndication practices and that they were not informed that their ads were being syndicated. The majority of such criticism has been directed at Google. Marketers also do not always know how syndicated paid-search ads are priced or placed across networks, which has led to lawsuits and protests against Google by competitors and advertisers, as well an anti-trust inquiry from the Federal Trade Commission.

== Bidding by placement ==
Today, several companies have built platforms specifically for search syndication, giving advertisers the ability to bid transparently by traffic source. This increases advertiser performance because it allows pricing based on traffic source quality.

Bidding by placement gives advertisers the ability to set bid prices by syndication partner.

=== Types of bidding by placement ===
Across-the-board: This is when the search engine bids one price for clicks from search results traffic, and a lower bid for all syndication traffic.

or

Bidding by individual source: Rather than discounting the entire network, syndication advertisers can specify the value of each traffic source based on its performance. There are now a handful of syndication networks that allows for bidding by specific traffic source and keyword is such as Ad.net and Admarketplace. This method has been increasing in popularity among advertisers and search syndication publishers with high-quality traffic.

== See also ==
- Web syndication
- Advertising network
- Content delivery platform
- Semantic targeting
