= Ahmed Santos =

Ahmed Santos may refer to:

- Ahmed Santos (newspaper columnist) (born 1974), newspaper columnist and former boxer
- Ahmed Santos (militant), convert to Islam; apprehended in Philippines for planning terrorist activities
