= Rajah Sulaiman Movement =

Philippines Islamic organization

The Rajah Sulaiman Movement was an organization in the Philippines, founded in 1991. The organization is also referred to as the Rajah Solaiman Movement and Rajah Sulayman Movement. According to the Philippine government, the group's militants were trained and financed by Jemaah Islamiah and Abu Sayyaf, a terrorist group with links to the Al-Qaeda.

On October 16, 2024, the group's founder Hilarion Del Rosario Santos III, was convicted by a Philippine court for participating in the 2000 Sipadan kidnappings and was sentenced to life imprisonment.

== Terrorist activities ==
RSM members were involved in the network responsible for the SuperFerry 14 bombing on 27 February 2004. The United Nations lists the attack among a series of bombings and plots involving members of the RSM and Abu Sayyaf following training associated with Jemaah Islamiyah and Abu Sayyaf. According to a separate United Nations profile, RSM leader Redendo Cain Dellosa led the SuperFerry 14 bombing and planted the bomb aboard the vessel. Abu Sayyaf publicly claimed responsibility for the attack.

RSM members were also involved in other bombing attacks and plots in the Philippines. The United Nations lists the G-Liner bombing plot of 25 December 2004 and the 2005 Valentine's Day bombings of 14 February among joint activities involving members of RSM and Abu Sayyaf. RSM member Angelo Ramirez Trinidad was responsible for assembling and planting improvised explosive devices on a G-Liner bus in December 2004. He later assembled, planted and detonated a bomb on a passenger bus in Makati during the Valentine's Day bombings in February 2005. Trinidad was convicted by a Philippine court in October 2005 for his involvement in the latter attack.

== See also ==
- History of the Philippines
- Religious terrorism
- Maritime terrorism in Southeast Asia
