= The Syndicate (disambiguation) =

The Syndicate is a British television drama.

The Syndicate may also refer to:

== Books ==
- The Syndicate (play), by Eduardo de Filippo
- The Syndicate, 1881 book by Charles Nordhoff
- The Syndicate, 1960 novel by Denys Rhodes
- The Syndicate, 2003 novel by Jon F. Merz

== Film and television ==
- The Syndicate (1968 film), based on the Denys Rhodes novel
- The Syndicate: A Death in the Family, a 1970 Italian crime film
- The Syndicate (game show), a 2000 British game show

== Music ==
- The Syndicate, 1960s Grimbsy-based band formed by Peter "Mars" Cowling, Steve Mills, Frank Singleton, Doug Hollingworth
- The Syndicate, previous name of Wu-Syndicate, Virginia hip hop group
- "The Syndicate", song by Ice-T from Power (Ice-T album)
- "The Syndicate", song by John Lee Hooker from John Lee Hooker Sings the Blues

== Other ==
- The Syndicate (building), a building in St. Louis, Missouri
- The Syndicate (Darker than Black), fictional underground organization in the anime series Darker than Black
- Syndicate Blackpool, the largest nightclub in North West England

== See also ==
- Syndicate (disambiguation)
