= Piracy in Indonesia =

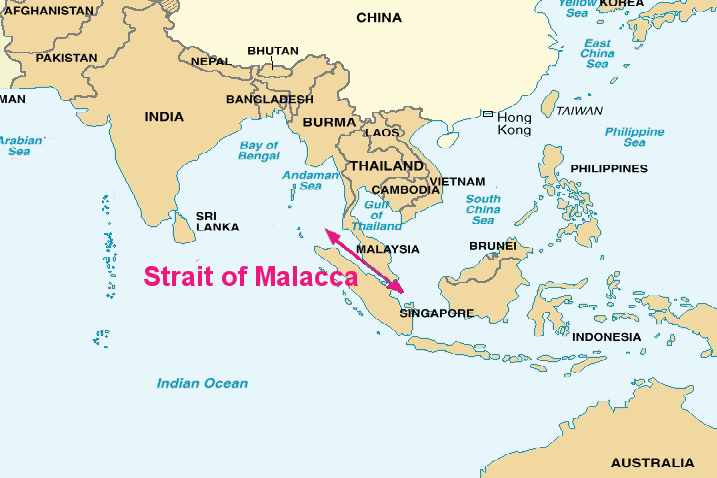
Strait of Malacca

Piracy in Indonesia is not only notorious, but according to a survey conducted by the International Maritime Bureau, Indonesia was the country sporting the highest rate of pirate attacks back in 2004. It subsequently dropped to second place of the world's worst country of pirate attacks in 2008, finishing just behind Nigeria. However, Indonesia remains deemed the country with the world's most dangerous water due to its high piracy rate.

With more than half of the world's piracy crimes surrounding the South-East Asia aquatic regions, the turmoil caused by piracy has made the Strait of Malacca a distinct pirate hotspot accounting for most of the attacks in Indonesia, making the ships that sail in this region risky ever since the Europeans arrived. The term 'Piracy in Indonesia' includes both cases of Indonesian pirates hijacking other cargo and tanks, as well as the high rate of practising piracy within the country itself. The Strait of Malacca is also one of the world's busiest shipping routes as it accounts for more than twenty-five percent of the world's barter goods that come mainly from China and Japan. Approximately 50,000 vessels worth of the world's trade employ the strait annually, including oil from the Persian Gulf and manufactured goods to the Middle East and Suez Canal. The success that stems from this trade portal makes the Strait an ideal location for pirate attacks.

Pirates in Indonesian waters more often threaten small and medium-sized ships. Pirates usually steal crew salaries, cell phones, laptops, and sea shipping equipment.

Pirates in Indonesia generally also work as taxi boat drivers and local fishermen. They are very familiar with the surrounding waters. They hide in the mangrove forests along the straits and steal valuables from boats passing near the coast.

== History ==
Piracy has been occurring in Indonesian waters since ancient times. In 1666, a VOC ship was pirated and anchored at Surabaya Port. The pirates then burned the ship after the ship was damaged. As a result of this incident, the VOC announced that it would give a cash reward to anyone who could capture the pirate, who turned out to be named Intjeh Cohdja. Anyone who captured him alive would receive a reward of 100 ringgits, while anyone who captured him dead would receive a reward of 50 ringgits. Meanwhile, anyone who could capture Intjeh Cohdja's crew alive would receive a reward of 10 ringgits, while anyone who captured him dead would receive a reward of 5 ringgits. Anyone who could seize a ship from Intjeh Chodja was allowed to own the ship and its cargo.

VOC sources from 1685 also mentioned that in Surabaya and other areas at the eastern tip of Java (Oosthoek) the name of a famous pirate named Wassingrana was spread. In short, the pirate and his crew from Makasar named "Winantacca" were successfully captured and sentenced to death by the coastal regents of the area. After the deaths of the pirates, the regents hoped that the coastal conditions and shipping would be safe again, because during that time the pirates had disturbed shipping and often robbed and killed the common people.

In 1758, an English ship arrived at the southern coast of Lumajang, on a journey from Bengkulu along the southern coast of Java to continue around the tip of East Java, and then headed west towards Batavia, suddenly the ship was hijacked and burned.

In June 1824 seventy ships filled with people from Papua and Seram appeared around Banyuwangi and at the same time the Kangean Islands were also plagued by fears of the same fleet, but the Dutch navy chased them, so they immediately left the place. Repeated attacks by Muslim elements who lived from piracy, prompted the colonial government to act to clear the Java Sea and the islands to the east of the pirates who were worrying. In 1847 the British steamship Nemesis encountered a fleet of 40 to 60 pirate ships.

Bawean Island, which in the past was often used as a hiding place for pirates from various ethnic groups, such as the Bugis, Madurese, Malay, Bajo and others. In the 18th century, the Blambangan coast was also often used as a hiding place for Bugis pirates.

== Reasons for pirate attacks ==
According to the International Maritime Bureau, the pirates are able to bypass authorities and elude detection by taking cover in numerous islands that readily surround the area. The region surrounding Indonesia alone has an estimate of over seventeen hundred islands and a seascape of tropical isles in which pirates are able to seek refuge. In addition, numerous major naval forces that use to patrol high seas has declined by fifty percent and this has adversely propelled the rate of pirate attacks in Indonesia. Many of these crimes are conducted for ransom, but there is a huge risk involved when these pirates are illegal syndicates who hijack tug boats, barges and large tankers. These containers carry explosive natural gases that can be used as weapons. The worry on piracy in Indonesia continues to soar when it was recorded back in 2012 that across the Indonesian archipelago, the number of petty thefts recorded was eighty-one and this accounts to more than one quarter of the world's piracy incidents. In addition, economic drivers such as poverty and corruption also accounts to the high rates of pirate attacks. As supported in a research article by David Rosenberg, the number of crimes has shot up ever since the 1997 currency crisis in Indonesia, driving numerous people to becoming pirates solely to earn a living wage. According to the Bali Times, Singapore, Malaysia and Indonesia are all responsible for patrolling their own regions and they do not have any jurisdiction beyond their water territories, making regional waters vulnerable and easy for pirates to escape. Furthermore, with Indonesia's coastline being twice as long as the perimeter of the earth, patrolling their water territory with slightly more than a dozen vessels is clearly inadequate. Within the first six months of 2012, Indonesia alone is responsible for twenty percent of the pirate attacks that happened globally.

== Cases in the 21st century ==
Over the last twenty years, the number of pirate attacks in Indonesia has dropped. However, there are still numerous reports on piracy occurring along coastal areas and gulfs. In 2011, 15 attacks were recorded in the month of January alone, where five attacks amounted to the total number of crimes during the first quarter of that respective year. In addition, during the month of September in that same year, two incidents of pirate attacks were reported. The first group consisted of four Indonesian pirates who were being arrested where they confessed that they aided and abetted a larger syndicate that operated in the Strait of Malacca. The second group of attackers during that month included six Indonesian men who were being detained. They were suspects for a group of Indonesian pirates that allegedly boarded a merchant vessel in Singapore. During the attack, warning shots were being fired and the pirates fled the scene. It is believed that the group arrived from Batam, an island that was closely situated to the Strait.

In 2012, four pirates boarded a Bulk Carrier in Gresik Inner Anchorage, Indonesia, and entered the forward ship's store. They managed to escape when a crew spotted them, but the pirates made off with a few property from the store.

=== Government intervention ===
Back in 2003, CNN reported that unless the Indonesian government enforces sea patrol, the crime rates for piracy will not be dropping anytime soon. However, after an attack back in the 1990s, Indonesia has partnered with Singapore and Malaysia to safeguard, monitor and ensure the security and safety of the water that borders outside their respective territory. One way to aid the problem, as reported by the International Maritime Bureau, is to be vigilant because pirates often abandon their attacks the moment they are being spotted. This is why the relationship between ship and water is vital. According to the Oceans Beyond Piracy, which is a project that looks to develop a multi-stakeholders response to piracy, they reported that a cooperative security measure undertaken by Singapore, Indonesia, Malaysia and Thailand ensures the security of the Strait of Malacca by instilling the Malacca Strait Patrols (MSP). The MSP comprises the Malacca Strait Sea Patrol (MSSP), the Eyes in the Sky (EiS) and the Intelligence Exchange Group (IEG) and the information that is being gathered on pirate attacks in Indonesia is being facilitated and shared between the countries. Furthermore, co-ordinated patrols have also been established. In September 2011, two warships were being deployed by Indonesia and Malaysia as part of a collaboration patrol to supervise pirate attacks at the Strait of Malacca. As recorded by Time World, an Indonesian naval officer claimed that they would be no match for the pirates back in 2004 because there were easy attacks-and-escape routes that made hunting these pirates down radically impossible. The number of attacks during 2004 also reached its crisis level. However, as of 2009, this problem has been countered as the rate of pirate crimes have dissipated. Although the number of pirate attacks that have occurred in the first quarter of the year in 2009 has almost doubled in comparison to the same period the year before, only one pirate attack took place in Indonesia as opposed to the 102 attacks that happened globally. The solution, as mentioned by the director of the International Marine Bureau in London, said that good coordination and cooperation from regional governments play a part in deterring the attacks on commercial shipping, because cohesive supervision leads to a riskier task for the pirates.

== Attacks per year ==
- 1999 — 113
- 2000 — 119
- 2002 — 103
- 2003 — 445
- 2005 — 79
- 2006 — 50
- 2007 — 43
- 2008 — 28
- 2009 — 15
- 2011 — 30
- 2012 — 51
- 2015 — 108
- 2017 — 43
- 2020 — 26
- 2021 — 9
- 2022 — 10

== See also ==
- Piracy in the Strait of Malacca
- Crime in Indonesia
