= Maritime terrorism in Southeast Asia =

Maritime terrorism in Southeast Asia refers to acts of extreme maritime violence committed with political motives within the Southeast Asian region. Despite seaborne terrorist attacks accounting for only 2% of all international terrorist incidents from 1978 to 2008, according to RAND's Terrorism Database, Southeast Asia has proven a hotbed of maritime terrorism. Due to the high frequency of pirates in the region, many Southeast Asian-based terrorist groups have appropriated piratical tactics in carrying out their violent political struggles. In 2003, the International Maritime Bureau reported that out of the 445 actual or attempted piratical attacks on merchant vessels, 189 occurred in Southeast Asia, which was more cases than either Africa or Latin America, with 121 attacks occurring in Indonesian waters and 35 attacks occurring in Malaysian and Singaporean waters. In 2004, while the number of actual and attempted attacks fell to 325, Southeast Asia remained at the top of the regional rankings, with 93 incidents occurring in Indonesian waters. Between 2014 and 2018, 242 attacks occurred in Southeast Asia, with the majority occurring in Indonesian waters. The most popular weapons of choice among Southeast Asian maritime terrorists have been explosive devices and firearms, which were used in roughly 60% of maritime attacks in the region.

== The concepts of maritime terrorism ==
=== Definitions of maritime terrorism ===
Maritime terrorism, like terrorism itself, is an essentially contested concept. Because there are over 100 definitions of terrorism from multiple sources, there is no commonly held definition. However, despite this situation there are still multiple UN conventions and regional legal processes to respond to maritime terrorist incidents.

The most prominent definition for maritime terrorism within Southeast Asia seems to have been given by the Council for Security Cooperation in the Asia Pacific (CSCAP) Working Group who defined maritime terrorism as:

...the undertaking of terrorist acts and activities within the maritime environment, using or against vessels or fixed platforms at sea or in port, or against any one of their passengers or personnel, against coastal facilities or settlements, including tourist resorts, port areas and port towns or cities.

However, according to Sheng, beyond the specific definition of maritime terrorism provided by the CSCAP, legal and political analysts are faced with a paradox; given that there is no universal definition of ‘terrorism’, how can a definition of ‘maritime terrorism’ possibly be reached, considering its status as a subvariant of terrorism?

=== International maritime laws and treaties ===
Before 1988, there had been a debate within the international legal community as to whether acts of maritime terrorism could be meaningfully prosecuted under anti-piracy legislation put forward as a part of the UNCLOS III agreement in 1982. The main debate took place around what precisely was meant by the ‘private ends’ that UNCLOS III classed as an attribute of piracy. International legal scholars like Douglas Guilfoyle argued that ‘private’ referred to a lack of state sanctioning behind the act, viewing ‘private’ and ‘public’ as the relevant dichotomy. Other scholars, like Saiful Karim, argued that ‘private’ referred to the presence of a profit motive behind the act, thus viewing ‘private’ and ‘political’ as the relevant dichotomy. Karim based this assessment off attempts to codify anti-piracy laws that date back to committee work by the League of Nations during the inter-war period.

A foundational convention that has been important in defining maritime terrorism was the Convention for the Suppression of Unlawful Acts against the Safety of Maritime Navigation (SUA) of 1988 and its accompanying SUA Fixed Platform Protocol. Although SUA 1988 did not define either ‘terrorism’ or ‘maritime terrorism’, it was a response to the 1985 attack on the Achille Lauro cruise ship, a high-profile terrorist incident. The United Nations General Assembly subsequently requested the International Maritime Organisation (IMO) to study terrorist attacks aboard or against ships, with an aim towards making recommendations for countermeasures. In November 1986, Italy, Austria and Egypt submitted a draft to the IMO for a new convention for the suppression of maritime terrorism, which had taken influences from 3 previous counterterrorist conventions; the Hague Convention on Aircraft Hijacking, the Montreal Convention on Sabotage of Airplanes and the International Convention Against the Taking of Hostages. After 2 years of deliberation, the IMO adopted the 1988 SUA Convention. The provisions of the convention made the threatened or actual hijacking, damaging or destruction of vessels and violence against crew prosecutable offences under the convention as such acts threatened the safe navigation of ships. Unlawful acts committed for both private and political ends were covered under the convention and an obligation was imposed on all states party to the agreement to extradite or prosecute convention offenders resident upon their territory. The SUA Fixed Platform Protocol was also signed at the 1988 Rome Convention after the United States and Spain raised the issue of fixed platforms as potential terrorist targets. The SUA Protocol thus made it a prosecutable offence to launch attacks against a fixed platform on the proviso that the fixed platform is attached to the seabed, serves economic purposes like resource exploration or exploitation and operates on a continental shelf.

However, the 1988 SUA Convention and Protocol did possess several flaws, one of which was that both pieces of legislation were reactive towards maritime terrorist acts and offered no preventative provisions or measures to prevent maritime terrorist acts from taking place, as put forth by Justin S. C. Mellor. In effect, the legislation was merely in place to prosecute perpetrators in the aftermath of the crime rather than provide contracting states with powers and legal authority to interdict and prevent violations of the 1988 SUA Convention and Protocol.

Following 9/11, the IMO adopted IMO Assembly Resolution A.924(22) which called for a review of existing legislation and measures that aimed to prevent terrorist acts against the safety and security of passengers, crew members and vessels. In October 2001, the IMO Legal Committee initiated a review of the 1988 SUA Convention and Protocol, with April 2002 witnessing the creation of a US-led Correspondence Group which would provide the IMO Legal Committee with a working paper containing potential amendments to SUA 1988 for the Legal Committee's 85th session in October 2003. The amendments suggested by the Correspondence Group presented before the IMO Legal Committee included 7 new offences under Article III of the 1988 SUA Convention and new provisions authorising the boarding and searching of foreign vessels in international waters who are either suspected of involvement in or are at risk of being targeted by acts prohibited under Article III. Although most IMO delegations expressed support for the amendments, concerns were raised concerning the amendments’ effects on freedom of navigation and the exclusivity of flag state jurisdiction over their vessels within international water. After three years of deliberation, the IMO Legal Committee completed its review during its 90th session during April 2005, with the resulting International Conference on the Revision of the SUA Treaties in October 2005 resulting in the official adoption of the 2005 SUA Protocol. New offences under the protocol included the knowing and intentional weaponisation of ships with terrorist motivation, the knowing and intentional transportation of WMDs and related materials via the high seas both with or without terrorist motivation and the knowing and intentional use of a ship as a transportation means for any person who has committed an offence under any current or future UN terrorism conventions, including the 1988 SUA Convention and the 2005 SUA Protocol.

=== Piracy-Terrorism Nexus ===
However, the piracy-terrorism nexus creates a theoretical-legal problem in relation to the legalistic conceptualisation of maritime terrorism outlined above. This nexus involves maritime terrorist acts where the tactic, immediate motive and long-term motive of maritime terrorists are mismatched, showing piratical characteristics over exclusively terrorist ones. These acts include the co-optation of pirates by maritime terrorists to do acts like hijacking and delivering a tanker to maritime terrorists for use as an attack delivery system, meaning the pirates would have indirectly assisted maritime terrorist activities. Other acts include maritime terrorists using piracy to extort and generate funds for their political cause. Both these acts are, tactically speaking, piratical, yet, strategically speaking, of a terrorist nature. Some maritime security analysts, like Peter Chalk, argue that this type of co-operation between pirates and maritime terrorists is implausible on a significant level due to their differing incentives and motives. Others, like Graham Gerard Ong, suggest that pirates and maritime terrorists are remarkably similar due to their transnational nature, similar tactics and weaponry and similar levels of accompanying extreme violence. This legal fuzziness and definitional ambiguity surrounding the legal classification of these illegal activities for prosecution has led to the conception that piracy and maritime terrorism exist on a continuum between each other. The Terrorism Financing Convention partially resolves this legal conundrum posed by the piracy-terrorism nexus for, by intentionally partaking in funding activities for illegal acts under numerous international treaties, including the SUA conventions, one can be prosecuted under the Terrorism Financing Convention. As the treaty punishes intentional collaboration with and enabling of maritime terrorist actors and explicitly mentions terrorism in its title, the treaty effectively punishes offenders as complicit with maritime terrorists.

=== Maritime Terrorist tactics ===
Within academic communities, it has been observed that maritime terrorists use an array of tactics in the perpetration of their attacks. There have also been speculations as to how maritime terrorist tactics might evolve in the future.

Martin N. Murphy identifies multiple means and tactics historically and currently utilised by maritime terrorists, including boat borne IEDs and naval mines. Within Southeast Asia, this has included:

-Suicide bomber divers or ‘human torpedoes’: Multiple attacks of this variant have been attempted within Southeast Asia. Al-Qaeda planned to use suicide bomber divers on US Navy vessels docked in Indonesian ports in 2002. In 2005, an ASG operative by the name Gamal Baharan stated that he had gone to a Palawan island ASG training camp in preparation for an underwater suicide bombing attack that was in the process of being planned by Jemaah Islamiyah. Attacks using a suicide bomber diver or an explosive-laden swimmer delivery vehicle could be used to attack several different types of maritime targets, including warships, naval bases, underwater oil pipelines or underwater telecommunication cables.

-Submarines as vehicles of terrorist transportation: There have been two notable instances of terrorist either obtaining or attempting to obtain these capabilities. The first was in 1999 where the Moro Islamic Liberation Front within the Southern Philippines had enquired as to the possibility of purchasing mini-submarines from North Korea. The second was in 2000, where the Tamil Tigers were exposed in the process of building one submarine and three mini-submarines in Phuket, Thailand.

Murphy also notes the possibility of certain rarer or unprecedented uses of maritime terrorist tactics being used at sea in the future. These include:

-Running an oil tanker aground or sabotaging it in a similar fashion to the M/V Limburg in 2002 to cause intense oil pollution through the leakage, subsequently closing ports or blocking critical chokepoints, like the Malacca Straits. This would cause both regional and global economic losses that would undermine the stability of Southeast Asian states and the international commercial system.

-Aerial attacks upon vessels, such as using explosive-laden small aircraft to ram and thus attack the vessel. Murphy, however, judges the chances of an attack like this as highly unlikely.

There has also been speculation on the possibility of vessels being used as a delivery system for powerful weapons and devices. Donna Nincic creates a typology for this type of attack between attacks from capacity, where maritime terrorists could use a vessel to deliver a traditional chemical, biological, radiological or nuclear device, and attacks from opportunity, whereby maritime terrorists hijack a vessel carrying dangerous maritime cargo (DMCs) such as LNG, LPG or ammonium nitrate and subsequently weaponise the cargo. However, Murphy casts doubt on the potential for maritime terrorists to use vessels as a delivery system for WMDs or ‘dirty bombs’, which he judges as incredibly improbable due to the difficulty in assembling such a device and the high risk of mishap in transporting the weapon to its target. Murphy also speculates upon the potential for massive casualty attacks committed using DMCs in a heavily populated area, but suggests that such an attack would be logistically difficult to perpetrate, potentially ineffective and highly detectable to security services.

=== Motivations for using maritime terrorist tactics ===
While maritime terrorist actors are obviously driven by political motives in turning to acts of terrorist violence as a central motive, there are deeper, more operational motives behind their target and means selection. For example, Colonel Antonio Guido Monno's work identifies a clear geostrategic motive behind Al-Qaeda's targeting of Western economic vessels and sea lines of communication (SLOCs) as part of a strategy of imposing crippling economic costs on the West to force a Western geopolitical retreat from the Muslim world. Both Chalk, Greenberg and Murphy similarly cover the strategic rationale behind acts like attacking ports and blocking SLOCs with oil tankers to destabilise local states economically and environmentally. All 3 scholars also view a symbolic rationale behind selecting high prestige large civilian targets like cruise ships as attacks of this kind ensures media attention, while striking at a high status target within radical anti-Western ideological frameworks; particularly contemporary jihadism. Thus, there are strategic, political-ideological and symbolic motives behind the use of different maritime terrorist acts. Other operational motives could include the desire to perpetrate a mass casualty or mass hostage-taking attack, which Murphy highlights as a key reason why maritime terrorist would choose to target a large civilian vessel, due to its confined internal environment. An incident like this has already been witnessed in Southeast Asia through the 2004 attack upon the M/V Superferry 14.

== Notable maritime terrorist hotspots within Southeast Asia ==
=== Regional overview ===
Regionally speaking, Southeast Asia is vulnerable to maritime terrorist attacks for a myriad of reasons. These primarily include:

- The importance of the Malacca Straits to international trade during a time when Al-Qaeda is increasingly targeting economic assets. More than 50% of global trade passes through the Malacca Straits.
- The presence of regional geographic features, such as ‘chokepoints’ like Malacca, Sunda and Lombok, or archipelagic islands in the Philippines and Indonesia, make attacks upon vessels and hiding from authorities easier for maritime terrorists. The security of vessels transporting energy supplies through Southeast Asian chokepoints has become an increasing energy security concern for many Northeast Asian countries, including China, South Korea and Japan.
- The heavy to existential dependency most Southeast Asian states have on uninterrupted maritime trade.
- Low rates of cargo inspection brought about by containerisation and lower security standards for cargo heading to Southeast Asia. Only around 1 to 5% of imported cargo containers are inspected.
- The trend of most Southeast Asian vessels being registered under primarily Panamanian flags of convenience; with the accompanying lack of transparency and lax regulation this brings.
- Security conditions within the region have also been blamed for the region's vulnerability to maritime terrorism. This includes sub-standard coastal surveillance by regional states and regional shipowners’ tendencies to staff their vessels with ‘skeleton crews’ that are more easily overpowered. Low port security has also been attributed to the region's vulnerability to maritime terrorism, for while the US's Container Security Initiative (CSI) has introduced advanced security measures within major regional ports, this only covers cargo heading to the US, not cargo heading to Southeast Asia.

Due to these regional factors, multiple potential maritime terrorist threats emanate from the region. According to Bateman, this presents multiple less credible and more credible threats.

Improbable forms of attack include:

- Weaponising a tanker vessel to block a chokepoint.
- Weaponising a tanker vessel to bomb a port.
- Using divers to bomb a vessel.

More probable forms of attack include:

- Bomb attacks against cruise ships or other types of civilian vessels.
- Using sea mines to block a chokepoint.
- Using boat borne IEDs against vessels, including warships and tankers.

Within Southeast Asia there are multiple terrorist factions operating, many of whom subscribe to jihadist ideology. This includes the transnational jihadist organisation Al-Qaeda, whose Asia-Pacific network remained mostly intact in the half-decade following 9/11. Al-Qaeda has built significant connections and provided support to many Southeast Asian militant Islamist and jihadist groups. These include the initially Indonesian-based Jemaah Islamiyah which Al-Qaeda developed into a pan-Asian jihadist network, stretching from Japan in the north to Australia in the south.

=== Malacca Straits ===
The two key terrorist organisations that have utilised the sea for terrorist purposes within the Malacca Straits are the Acehnese nationalist Gerakan Aceh Merdeka (GAM) movement within Indonesia and the pan-Asian jihadist network of Jemaah Islamiyah (JI) which has also maintained a presence around the Straits.

=== Malacca Straits – GAM ===
GAM fought an insurgency against the Indonesian government from 1976 to 2005, when GAM started ceasefire negotiations with the Indonesian government after the destruction and death brought upon GAM's ranks by the 2004 tsunami. The period from 2002 to 2005 witnessed an increase in kidnap-and-ransom attacks allegedly perpetrated by GAM within the Indonesian waters of the northern Malacca Strait. This increase in kidnappings coincided with majority GAM territorial possession of Aceh, with around 80% of all Acehnese villages falling directly under GAM control. This large number of territorial possessions would theoretically make kidnap-and-ransom attacks easier to execute. GAM developed its naval capabilities out of necessity due to Aceh's maritime geography. GAM used small boats to smuggle weapons from southern Thailand and Malaysia into the Aceh province and smuggle fighters both into and out from Malaysia. Although GAM did not carry out attacks on Indonesian naval vessels blockading Aceh, GAM did use boats as transportation to and from Aceh to deliver and sell cannabis on Batam island within the Malacca Strait to raise funds for their cause.

However, the extent of GAM's implication in the increase of kidnap-and-ransom attacks in the early 2000s is disputed. Noel Choong, an International Maritime Bureau (IMB) official, expressed doubt over whether the kidnappings were being perpetrated by GAM or local bandits and criminal elements. Additionally, GAM's exiled central leadership in Sweden has not endorsed kidnap-and-ransom tactics, for they have been trying to generate support among the international community for Acehnese independence. However, testimonies to the IMB from former hostages have given some indication of the involvement of GAM members in these attacks. GAM also seems to derive a significant portion of its funding from kidnap ransoms and drug trafficking. Therefore, it would be more accurate to state that some sections of GAM participate in these acts for their funding, instead of presenting GAM as an organisation involved in maritime terrorism to the same extent as JI or the ASG. Considering this controversy, there are therefore two ways of conceiving of GAM and its involvement in maritime terrorism.

One view espoused by Amirell is that GAM is neither a maritime terrorist or ‘political pirate’ organisation due to its lack of affiliation with Al-Qaeda or JI, subsequently viewing kidnap-and-ransom attacks as the behaviours of economically-driven criminal elements within GAM's ranks.

However, a second view espoused by Murphy, referring to the piracy-terrorism nexus, notes that insurgent or terrorist groups with political ends sometimes use piratical tactics in the furthering of their political agenda. Therefore, in this view, GAM's Acehnese nationalist political motivations would be contextually important in relation to the piratical acts of individual GAM members. Thus, GAM's rogues would be seen as politically extreme instead of criminal.

Below is a list of kidnap-and-ransom attacks where the involvement of GAM members is suspected:

-In August 2001, the MV Ocean Silver was attacked by a group of armed assailants with small arms and a grenade launcher while passing the Acehnese east coast in the northern part of the Straits of Malacca. 6 of the crew members, including the ship master, were taken hostage and brought ashore. The remaining 6 crew members were left on board the vessel for three days before being rescued by the Indonesian Navy. The armed assailants allegedly demanded a US$34,000 ransom from the ship owner to release the hostages. The assailants claimed that the "financial contribution" of the ransom money would be used to assist the Acehnese nationalist cause.

-In February 2004, the Indonesian Navy sank a vessel called the MV Champion XIX, which had been hijacked by a group of assailants. The Indonesian authorities claimed that the hijackers were GAM operatives.

=== Malacca Straits – Jemaah Islamiyah (JI) ===
Jeemah Islamiyah (JI) is a transnational jihadist terrorist group that was founded in Indonesia during the early 1990s. Their aim is to establish an Islamic state in Southeast Asia that includes southern Thailand, Malaysia, Singapore, Indonesia, Brunei and the southern Philippines. They intend to achieve this objective by carving out smaller states within current state borders before unifying these statelets. JI is affiliated with Al-Qaeda and is mostly land-based in its terrorist acts, yet JI has previously shown an interest in attacking vessels in the Straits of Malacca. While their maritime capabilities have remained limited, they have been known to monitor vessels visiting Singaporean naval bases and are suspected of developing maritime expertise.

JI has historically used small boats, operated by either themselves or criminal elements, to move across international borders, given their transnational jihadist nature, or smuggle weapons into target countries.

Although, as of yet, JI has not perpetrated any maritime terrorist acts, there have been multiple foiled plots where JI had been planning to perpetrate a maritime attack. These include:

-In December 2001, the Singapore Internal Security Department arrested 13 JI operatives for planning multiple attacks against Western targets within Singapore. One of these plots included using a boat borne IED to bomb a US Navy vessel while it was passing through the narrowest part of the Johore Strait to minimise the chance of effective evasion. The cell had also been monitoring the patrol route of Singapore's Police Coast Guard. While the plan had first surfaced during the mid-1990s, the Singaporean JI cell had lacked the necessary maritime capabilities to carry out the attack. However, the cell revived the plot in early 2001 after 2 unknown Middle Easterners approached the cell for intelligence regarding US Navy vessels stationed in Singapore.

-In August 2004, the head of Indonesia's State Intelligence Agency, Abdullah Makhmud Hendropriyono, declared that captured high-ranking JI operatives had admitted that they had been recently planning attacks against vessels in the Malacca Straits. In the same month, US intelligence officials reported that they had intercepted communications between JI operatives that had exposed a plot to seize a vessel moving through the area by contracting local pirates. The captured vessel was then to be wired with explosives and either used against another vessel, detonated in a port or used as a tool of blackmail against high-traffic and commercially valuable SLOCs.

=== Southern Philippines ===
Despite being a hotspot of multiple long-lasting insurgencies, ranging from the Maoist New People's Army to the Islamist Moro Islamic Liberation Front, the most notable Philippines-based terror threat, from a US perspective, has emanated from the Abu Sayyaf Group (ASG) which was founded by Ustadz Abdurajak Janjalani, a veteran of the Afghan-Soviet war who was radicalised into transnational jihadism during the course of the conflict. Ustadz was a close friend of Osama bin Laden and established ties between the ASG and Al-Qaeda and JI.

Under Ustadz, the ASG was a highly organised entity consisting of sophisticated administrative and military structures. Ustadz also operated as the ASG's ideological and theological centre. However, after the killing of Ustadz Janjalani in 1998 by Philippines security forces, the ASG went from being an Al-Qaeda-funded terrorist organisation that was ideologically driven by jihadist goals to a collapsed terrorist organisation that acted more like a criminal gang than a jihadist group in its kidnapping, civilian extortion and drug dealing behaviours, according to Abuza. The ASG also factionalised, with one Basilan island-based faction and one Sulu island-based faction.

Ustadz Janjalani's death resulted in the ASG shifting from being predominantly land-based in its conduct to being increasingly maritime-based in its operations due to the land-based counterterrorist measures of the Philippines security service. This shift was additionally helped due to ASG's ownership of maritime equipment and the backgrounds of most ASG operatives being based in local Muslim families with centuries-old maritime traditions.

As of 2018, the ASG mostly operated around Jolo, Basilan and Mindanao. In 2013, despite being an Al-Qaeda affiliate funded by Mohammed Jamal Khalifa, one of Osama bin Laden's brothers, the ASG shifted their allegiance from Al-Qaeda to the Islamic State in Iraq and Syria. The leader of the group has been identified as Khadaffi Janjalani by the Armed Forces of the Philippines. The group's historic, and contemporary main objective is to achieve an Islamic state in the Southern Philippines, particularly West Mindanao and the Suluwesi Archipelago. The eventual aim of this hypothetical Islamic state is to be incorporated into JI's larger Southeast Asian Islamic state. Beside demanding an independent Moro state, the ASG have also requested for prohibitions against fishing vessels operating in the Sulu Sea.

Since the ASG's foundation, it has committed multiple maritime terrorist acts. These include:

- On 10 August 1991, the ASG bombed the M/V Doulous, a motor vessel and foreign missionary ship, in Zamboanga City. 2 Christian missionaries were killed in the blast. This was the ASG's first operation and an early demonstration of their maritime capabilities.
- On 23 April 2000, the ASG kidnapped 21 tourists from a resort on Sipadan island, a Malaysian island located in the Celebes Sea. The Philippine government eventually resolved the situation by paying a $15 million ransom.
- On 30 September 2000, the ASG kidnapped 3 Malaysians at the Pasir Beach Resort in Sabah, Malaysia using a speedboat. They were eventually rescued by the Philippine military in Talipao, Sulu island.
- On 27 May 2001, the ASG kidnapped 17 Philippine and 3 American nationals from the Dos Palmas beach resort on Palawan island. The ASG operatives covertly entered the resort using a boat, kidnapped their victims from their seaside cabins and transported them to the ASG base on Basilan island. The kidnapping received international notoriety when several of the hostages, including an American national, were beheaded. During a rescue operation by the Philippine's military, 2 more hostages, including another American national, were killed.
- In June 2002, the ASG kidnapped multiple foreign nationals, including 4 Indonesian sailors who had been crew abroad the SM88, a coal-carrying vessel that was taking coal from Indonesia to Cebu Island in the Central Philippines. 2 of the sailors managed to escape the ASG following their capture, 1 sailor was rescued and 1 sailor was killed during a Philippine military rescue operation in February 2003.
- On 27 February 2004, the ASG bombed the M/V Superferry 14 in Manila Bay. The bomb started a fire abroad the ferry that trapped the ship's passengers at sea. Out of the 899 people on board, 116 were killed. Although the Philippine government denied the ASG perpetrated the attack, despite the ASG admitted responsibility for the attack, a government investigation concluded that the ASG had in fact perpetrated the attack.
- In March 2016, the ASG kidnapped 10 Indonesian sailors from a vessel carrying coal from South Kalimantan. They also kidnapped another 10 Indonesian sailors who had been fishing in Philippine waters.

== Maritime counterterrorism within Southeast Asia ==
=== United States ===
The United States of America and its military has been a key extra-regional power that has become involved in Southeast Asian maritime counterterrorism, particularly following the 9/11 terror attacks.

The USA has suggested two major efforts in relation to maritime security, including maritime counterterrorism.

The first was the Proliferation Security Initiative (PSI) which was advocated for by the Bush administration as an agreement by which the US and other PSI participants would cooperate with each other in interdictions against vessels or aircraft from ‘rogue nations’ carrying technologies or material used to create or deliver WMDs. The obligations of PSI participants are, however, based on recommendation and are not legally binding. For this reason, the PSI is referred to in a cooperative operational sense rather than as a multilateral arrangement. Despite the initial involvement of 13 countries in the 5-day interdiction exercise hosted in Singapore during 2005, only 3 Asia-Pacific countries have remained as full participants: Australia, Japan and Singapore.

The second was the Regional Maritime Security Initiative (RMSI) which was proposed as a conceptual framework by the US in 2004. It was designed to facilitate in the occurrence of neutral and multilateral maritime security cooperation through intelligence sharing, providing an early warning system regarding transnational maritime threats and assisting law enforcement in monitoring, identifying and interdicting suspicious vessels in national and international waters. The initiative was supposed to focus on maritime security in the Malacca Straits. However, after a 2004 speech by Admiral Fargo in front of the US Congress, Indonesia and Malaysia strongly opposed and rejected the initiative after Admiral Fargo suggested that the US military was looking to deploy special operations forces and Marines with high-speed boats into the Malacca Straits for the purpose of interdiction. However, Singapore welcomed the potential for a U.S presence in the area, viewing it as a stabilising factor from a long-standing Singaporean ally. Due to widespread opposition to the RMSI concept, United States Pacific Command (now United States Indo-Pacific Command) gradually abandoned the concept, with the term ‘RMSI’ vanishing from the USPACOM's official communications during 2005.

=== People's Republic of China ===
The People's Republic of China has been another extra-regional power involved in Southeast Asian maritime security.

In 2004, the PRC and ASEAN declared a ‘Memorandum of Understanding’ in relation to non-traditional security threats, including piracy and terrorism at sea. Within the document, the PRC and ASEAN stated that they would move towards greater cooperation in the fields of informational exchanges, the exchange and training of security personnel, law enforcement cooperation and joint research relating to non-traditional security threats. These areas of cooperation included intelligence sharing, law enforcement capacity building, bilateral legal arrangements and joint security research by the signatories’ experts.

In 2005, Guo Xinning, a senior PLA colonel and a visiting researcher at the Institute for Southeast Asian Studies at the time, wrote that maritime terrorism had the potential to become an increasingly serious maritime security threat in the future. Although he believed that Southeast Asia had witnessed relatively sparse evidence of maritime terrorism, he saw some terror groups, particularly JI, as having the intent of launching a large-scale maritime terrorist campaign within the region.

=== Japan ===
Japan has partaken in a few capacity building initiatives relating to maritime security within Southeast Asia. During 2002, the Japanese Coast Guard conducted joint exercises with Royal Brunei Marine Police and used the Yashima patrol ship to partake in joint training with Indian Coast Guards, make port calls in Singapore and patrol the Malacca Strait. During 2003, Japan and the Philippines led a training exercise and the Yashima was deployed again in a training exercise with Malaysia. 2003 also witnessed Japan aid Indonesia in drafting a new coast guard code for the country. Although Japan has remained a consistent proponent of joint multilateral patrols, these calls have been historically rejected by Southeast Asian states due to lingering memories of Japanese conduct during World War II. Article IX of Japan's constitution can also be interpreted as restricting the use of defensive Japanese military forces to Japanese citizens and vessels, further complicating and restricting the potential for Japanese maritime security activities in Southeast Asia on an internal legal basis.

However, Japan has played a large role in both funding maritime counterterrorist entities and in facilitating multilateral cooperation. Japanese funding has been given to counterterrorism programmes in Indonesia, Malaysia and Singapore through the ‘Official development assistance’ programme. In 2004, the APEC Counter-Terrorist Task Force's ‘Heads of Asian Coast Guards Agencies Meeting’ was held in Tokyo. In 2005, Japan hosted the "ASEAN-Japan Seminar on Maritime Security and Combating Piracy" in Tokyo where the ASEAN member states evaluated their individual implementation progress of the International Ship and Port Security Code.

In terms of multilateral arrangements, there have been 2 proposed arrangements put forth by Japan.

The first came in the form of the Ocean Peacekeeping Force (OPF) initiative, that came after Japanese efforts at maritime security capacity building among Malacca Straits littoral states during the 1990s. During the 1999 ASEAN +3 (Japan, South Korea and the PRC) summit, Japanese prime minister Keizo Obuchi proposed the formation of a regional coast guard as a maritime security actor in the Straits of Malacca. The OPF would include multilateral patrols of Japanese, South Korean, Chinese, Malaysian, Indonesian and Singaporean naval forces. However, this proposal was strongly objected to by the PRC who believed that the initiative was designed to extend Japan's East Asian security role and contain the PRC's maritime influence.

The second came in the form of the Regional Cooperation Agreement on Combating Piracy and Armed Robbery against Ships in Asia (ReCAAP) initiative, which was adopted in 2004 by 16 states, including all 10 ASEAN members, Japan, South Korea, the PRC, India, Bangladesh and Sri Lanka. Under the initiative, signatories may request each other for assistance in detecting and interdicting suspicious vessels and persons while the actual framework itself facilitates in forging cooperative arrangements and enhancing maritime security capacity building. However, the framework does not deal with the means of assistance or the use of maritime force. Voluntarism has been the basis of much of the framework, ranging from information input to funding.

=== Association of Southeast Asian Nations (ASEAN) ===
As a regionalist supranational actor, ASEAN has played a role in maritime security within Southeast Asia.

ASEAN has been encouraging its member states to sign and ratify international maritime treaties. From 1997, ASEAN established a high-level Expert Group to draft the ASEAN Plan of Action on Transnational Crime, though the plan was officially adopted in 1999. The document was non-binding but encouraged increased cooperation related to maritime security, including legislative means like ratify international treaties and operational means like capacity building activities and the establishment of an ASEAN Centre for Transnational Crime (ACTC).

In the 10th ARF ministerial meeting during 2003, a statement that pertained to maritime security was made following the meeting. This included a declaration that all ASEAN member states would try to implement international maritime treaties, including the SUA 1988 treaties. But, to date, only Singapore, Brunei, Myanmar, the Philippines and Vietnam have become SUA 1988 signatories, with the two other Malacca Straits littoral states of Malaysia and Indonesia not being SUA 1988 signatories. In 2004, the ARF's Statement on Strengthening Transport Security against International Terrorism was adopted, which advocated for the full implementation of the IMO's International Ship and Port Security Code by ARF participants as a countermeasure to the threat of maritime terrorism.

Although ARF participants have partaken in regional maritime security capacity building and operations with one another though, as of yet, not under an ARF organisational framework. Examples of this include the ‘Eyes in the Sky’ (EiS) initiative in 2005. This was done by Indonesia, Malaysia and Singapore to create a maritime domain awareness (MDA) network in the Strait of Malacca. This arrangement had been preceded by a Singaporean-Indonesian cooperative system that aimed to create a real-time surveillance system over the Strait of Singapore. As part of the initiative, each country allocates maritime patrol aircraft to run 2 sorties per week along the Malacca and Singapore Straits. Each flight carries a maritime patrol team that consists of military personnel from the 3 countries. In 2004, following a precipitous increase in maritime attacks within the straits, Indonesia, Malaysia and Singapore also launched the MALSINDO trilateral naval patrols. Similarly to the EiS initiative, these patrols were confined in their area of operation to the Malacca and Singapore Straits and outside an ASEAN framework. MALSINDO patrols were coordinated in the sense that maritime patrols were only responsible for patrolling their own territorial waters, remained under separate national military commands with limited powers of ‘hot pursuit’ into the sovereign waters of other participating countries. In 2006, the EiS was renamed into the ‘Malacca Straits Patrols’ (MSP) initiative after new standard operating procedures were signed by the participating countries to improve the operational effectiveness of naval and maritime air patrols. While, in a 2005 ARF workshop, a large number of participating countries supported the intensification of the role of the ‘Five Powers Defence Arrangement’ in regional maritime security matters, as well as the continuation of coordinated patrols, there was still no consensus in support of joint patrols.

As part of ensuring maritime security within Southeast Asia, ASEAN has fulfilled a role in facilitating defence dialogues with key extra-regional powers. The ASEAN Defence Ministers Meeting (ADMM) run the ADMM+ scheme that aims to construct an international deliberative framework for maritime security. This is done to assist in the tasks of goal setting and coordinated actions within the framework of the ADMM.

=== International Maritime Organisation (IMO) ===
In response to the 9/11 attacks, the IMO wished to revise their countermeasures against maritime violence and crime. Following a 2002 Diplomatic Conference at the IMO HQ, the International Ship and Port Security (ISPS) Code was incorporated as a new chapter under the SOLAS treaty, giving it the force of international law. The ISPS Code aimed to create a consistent standard upon which SOLAS-contracting governments could evaluate and manage risk to vessels and port facilities and, accordingly, instate appropriate security measures should the levels of maritime threat change. The code covers passenger and cargo vessels (including tankers) of 500 gross tonnage or above as well as port facilities harbouring vessels on international voyages and offshore drilling platforms. The code legally imposed obligations on contracting governments, vessels (including the ship master), shipping companies and port facilities.

ISPS Code includes two parts. Part A provides mandatory security requirements for contracting governments, port facilities and shipping companies while Part B contains implementation guidelines regarding Part A requirements. Both vessels and port facilities must control and monitor access to their domain, monitor human activity and cargo within their domain and maintain functional security communication. There are 3 security levels varying in threat severity due to the diverse security needs of vessels and ports and the fluid nature of maritime threat over time. It is the contracting governments’ responsibility to provide vessels and ports with security levels and to communicate security information to the relevant vessels, port facilities and the IMO (which the IMO uses to facilitate effective communication between ship companies/vessel security officers and port security officers).

Ship companies are obliged to install an Automatic Identification System (AIS) on their vessels, make sure their vessels present their IMO Ship Identification Number externally and internally, make sure they maintain an onboard ship security system and make sure each of their vessels obtains a Ship Security Certificate to demonstrate that their vessel complies with the ISPS Code. Each shipping company must appoint a Company Security Officer (CSO) and Ship Security Officers (SSOs) for each of their vessels while each state must appoint Port Security Officers (PSOs) once the contracting government or relevant security authority has conducted initial port facility risk assessments to determine which port facilities require a PSO. It is then the responsibility of SSOs and PSOs to undertake ship and port facility security assessments, organise ship and port security arrangements and plans (which must be approved by each vessel's administration or contracting government, respectively) and actively monitor their security situation.

Although, globally, 89.5% of 9,000 declared port facilities had port facility security plans and 90% of relevant ships possessed a Ship Security Certificate as of 2004, several flaws can be identified with the code at a Southeast Asian regional level.

Firstly, as the treaty only applies to 500 gross tonnage vessels on international voyages, the code does not cover fishing vessels, ships under 500 gross tonnage or domestic trade merchant ships. Both Indonesia and the Philippines possess large fishing fleets, high quantities of small trading vessels and large domestic commercial fleets. This means that many vessels in the region are not held to the ISPS’ standards, including maritime terrorists like the ASG who overwhelmingly use small high-speed boats.

Secondly, due to the heavily US-endorsed and supported nature of the ISPS Code, the code places difficulties upon developing countries, like countries within Southeast Asia. In the view of Sam Bateman, many developing countries would rather give higher spending priority to domestic issues like economic development rather than maritime terrorism countermeasures that, in the final analysis, benefit Western interests over domestic ones. US threats to deny entry to non-compliant ships, thus making ISPS Code compliance a pre-condition for trading with the US, are subsequently seen as an abuse of international power. Therefore, there are multiple economic implementation costs that developing Southeast Asian states might not be willing to pay.

The ISPS Code also faces some effective enforcement issues, like most international laws. While the IMO monitors compliance, the flag state's efficiency in administratively establishing the code's arrangements and ensuring the actual compliance of vessels under its maritime jurisdiction determines ultimate compliance. Therefore, arrangements that flag states report as being in place may not be operationally effective. Given the developing nature of many Southeast Asian states, administrative issues might frustrate its implementation.

Additionally, the IMO has been working with the International Labour Organisation (ILO) to make it harder for terrorists to use vessels as transportation for their operatives. With over 1.3 million international seafarers, it has been suggested that seafarer identification documents that use biometrics ought to be introduced. The Seafarers’ Identity Documents Convention of 2003 only requires 2 ratifying state signatories to enter into force. However, multiple concerns have been raised by states regarding it, ranging from its requirement for visa-free entry to infrastructural problems relating to distribution, identity verification and maintenance of national databases.

=== Other maritime security entities ===
In response to the rise of non-traditional maritime threats in Southeast Asia, like maritime terrorism, forms of multilateral cooperation between different regional states have been used for maritime counterterrorist purposes.

Within Southeast Asia, initially nationally based Coastal Watch System (CWS) initiatives, primarily in the Philippines, developed national maritime domain awareness (MDA) networks through comprehensive levels of inter-agency cooperation. When the Philippines’ CWS was connected with similar systems based in Malaysia and Indonesia, a sub-regional MDA network was created within the wider multilateral Asia-Pacific system, including the Singapore-based Information Fusion Centre (IFC). This Asia-Pacific system is coordinated by the Maritime Research Information Centre (MRIC) based in Manilla, who provide regional maritime threat assessments for Southeast Asia and possess some surveillance capabilities through an Automated Information System (AIS).

As main functions, MDA networks are responsible for the circulation of maritime incident reports, participation in active maritime tracking and, when necessary, the circulation of sensitive maritime information within relevant maritime security networks. The IFC MDA centre is primarily funded by the Singaporean government. After being founded in 2009, the IFC aims to develop a shared overview of Southeast Asian maritime security involving multiple maritime security concerns, including the occurrence of maritime terrorism. Operating out of Changi naval base, the centre is staffed by the Singaporean navy and liaison officers from around 15 countries, with 23 countries having signed bilateral agreements with the Singaporean state regarding the IFC. As its main capabilities, the IFC's liaison system allows for rapid information sharing and analysis, while its Open and Analysed Shipping Information System (OASIS) allows for active monitoring of vessels and maritime situations using AIS, LRIT and information relayed through the system's mobile app. The IFC also serves a capacity building role by facilitating in the training of regional and international security practitioners.

Given the potential future technological innovations and applications of satellite and aerial drone technology, the monitoring and surveillance abilities of entities like the IFC is likely to increase in its effectiveness, suggesting they may become increasingly important in maritime security affairs.

Since the end of the Cold War, American and European private military and security companies (PMSC) have been offering maritime security services within Southeast Asia. In the case of Indonesia, the port of Belawan has had its port security provided by local PMSCs who are hired by ship owners or state-run port management companies. Many of these local PMSCs have connections to the Indonesian military through their owners.
