= Satellite Reign =

2015 video game

- Developer: 5 Lives Studios
- Publisher: 5 Lives Studios
- Designer: Chris Conte
- Programmer: Mike Diskett
- Artists: Dean Ferguson; Brent Waller; Mitchell Clifford
- Composer: Russell Shaw
- Engine: Unity
- Platforms: Windows, macOS, Linux
- Release: 28 August 2015
- Genres: Tactical role-playing game, real-time tactics
- Modes: Single-player, multiplayer

Satellite Reign is a 2015 cyberpunk real-time tactics video game developed and published by 5 Lives Studios. The game was released for Windows, macOS, and Linux in August 2015. It is a spiritual successor to the Syndicate series, which co-founder and programmer Mike Diskett had worked on. The name of the game is derived from one of the weapons featured in Syndicate Wars called "Satellite Rain". It received positive reviews from critics.

== Development ==
After the release of the Syndicate reboot in 2012, the Syndicate Wars producer and lead programmer, Mike Diskett, expressed his displeasure over the game's lack of similarity to previous entries in the series:

A lot of Syndicate fans, including myself, got our hopes up when we heard a new Syndicate game was in development, but in the end it turned out to be nothing like the original games.

This encouraged him to create the Brisbane-based 5 Lives Studios (which included team members who had worked on other video game series such as Grand Theft Auto, L.A. Noire, and Darksiders) and develop a spiritual successor to the game he made back in 1993:

I've decided to take it upon myself to deliver what the fans really wanted.

Unlike the reboot, which was a first-person shooter, 5 Lives Studios tried to build upon the real-time tactics gameplay experience found in the original games by introducing a fixed camera system and character classes.

On 28 June 2013, Satellite Reign was announced on crowdfunding website Kickstarter with a £350,000 (US$546,875) goal. On 29 July 2013, the project was successfully funded with £461,333 (US$720,832) raised.

The game was released for Windows, macOS, and Linux on 28 August 2015. A post-launch update introducing four-player cooperative gameplay was released in July 2016.

The soundtrack was composed by Russell Shaw, who worked on both Syndicate and Syndicate Wars.

== Plot ==
Satellite Reign takes place in an unnamed fictional city referred to as "The City". A corporation named Dracogenics rises to prominence after releasing a prototype named Resurrection-Tech that is capable of providing immortality. Dracogenics turns to corporate crime and bribes politicians with immortality in exchange for control and influence. This eventually leads to the privatization of The City's services and full corporate control over The City's police force. Civil unrest arises and is suppressed by Dracogenics, but a rival corporation soon comes to light and launches anti-Dracogenics attacks. The player controls this rival corporation and must overthrow Dracogenics from The City.

== Reception ==
Reception

Aggregate score
Aggregator	Score
Metacritic	75/100

Review scores
Publication	Score
Destructoid	8/10
GameRevolution	4.5/5
GameSpot	6/10
GamesTM	8/10
PC Gamer (US)	80/100
Gameplanet	9/10
GameStar	83/100

Satellite Reign received "generally favorable" reviews from critics, according to review aggregator Metacritic.
