= Syndicate (series) =

Video game series

- Genres: Real-time tactics, first-person shooter
- Developers: Bullfrog Productions, Ocean Software, Starbreeze Studios
- Publisher: Electronic Arts
- Platforms: MS-DOS, Windows, PlayStation, PlayStation 3, Xbox 360, Amiga, CD32, Classic Mac OS, Genesis, Super NES, 3DO, Jaguar, Archimedes, FM Towns, PC-98, Sega CD, PSP
- First release: Syndicate; 2 July 1993
- Latest release: Syndicate; 21 February 2012

Syndicate is a series of science fiction video games created by Bullfrog Productions and published by Electronic Arts. There are two main titles: Syndicate (1993) and Syndicate Wars (1996), both of which are isometric real-time tactics games. An additional first-person shooter Syndicate title was released in 2012, and a spiritual successor to the series (returning to the real-time tactics format), entitled Satellite Reign, was released in 2015.

== Games ==
=== Syndicate (1993) ===
Syndicate, the first game in the series, was first released for PC and Amiga in June 1993, with later releases on other platforms including Sega Genesis, SNES, Atari Jaguar, and PlayStation Portable. In 2015, the game was made available for free on Electronic Arts' Origin platform, however it now costs £4.25 (As of 20JUN19).

An expansion pack, titled Syndicate: American Revolt, was also released for PC and Amiga in 1993.

A special edition version, titled Syndicate Plus was released for PC in 1994.. It included the original game, the American Revolt expansion pack, and support for then current versions of Sound Blaster cards.

=== Syndicate Wars ===
The second game in the series, Syndicate Wars, was released for PC in October 1996 and PlayStation in July 1997. Syndicate Wars utilized a more demanding graphics engine, including a 3-dimensional environment, compared with the 2-dimensional layout of Syndicate).

In 2008, a digital distribution version of the PlayStation version was released on the PlayStation Network.

=== Syndicate (2012) ===
Reports of a new Syndicate game, developed for EA by Starbreeze Studios, first surfaced in March 2009 and were officially confirmed in September 2011. The game, also entitled Syndicate, was released on 21 February 2012; however, it used a first-person shooter format, which differed significantly from the isometric real-time tactics format of the series' original games.

=== Future and cancelled games ===
According to a former Bullfrog Productions employee, a follow-up Syndicate title for PC began development shortly after the release of Dungeon Keeper 2 in 1999; however, this development effort was never completed. This was followed by several further development efforts which did not progress.

The same employee states that a Syndicate title on PlayStation 2 was under development for approximately one year; however, this title was also never released. It was intended to feature a "free-roaming, multi-tiered city" and two new factions, known as the Freemen and the Hybrid. Several pieces of concept art from this project were released by another former Bullfrog employee, Mike Man.

In a 2006 interview at the Leipzig Games Convention for GameSpot, Peter Molyneux (co-founder of Bullfrog Productions) said that he would like to revisit some of his old efforts, but adds that it is very unlikely that will happen; however, Molyneux made one possible exception:

"Aside from the licensing complications, some sort of next-gen online version of Syndicate would certainly be popular with gamers."

==== Creation ====
A Bullfrog project named Creation was intended to take place on an alien world set in the Syndicate universe. The game's plot was to have EuroCorp as the antagonists, while the player, representing a third-party biologist, utilized semi-sentient dolphins to fight them.

Following development for MS-DOS, Amiga CD32, PlayStation, and Sega Saturn, the game was cancelled in 1997.

=== Related games ===
==== Satellite Reign ====
On 15 May 2013, Mike Diskett (who was the producer and lead programmer for Syndicate Wars) posted a video on YouTube that revealed an imminent Kickstarter crowdfunding campaign for a new spiritual successor to Syndicate Wars, called Satellite Reign, which returned to the series' original real-time tactics format. When it closed on 28 July 2013, the campaign had raised £461,333 ($720,832), compared to its £350,000 ($546,875) goal. Satellite Reign was subsequently released on August 28, 2015.

== Plot ==
=== Syndicate (1993) and Syndicate Wars ===
The original Syndicate is set in the year 2096. As outlined in the game's instruction manual, multinational megacorporations have replaced nation-state governments, and one such corporation, EuroCorp, has manufactured the "CHIP": a device implanted in a person's neck that alters their perception ("numbing their senses to the misery and squalor around them") and allows them to be easily manipulated. The megacorporations have subsequently been infiltrated and overtaken by corrupt crime syndicates vying for global control.

The player is placed in charge one such corporation, for which they choose a name and logo. During the course of the game, as missions for the player's corporation are completed by teams of cyborg enforcers known as "agents," it gains global dominance over its competitors.

Syndicate Wars is set 95 years after the original game (in the year 2191), when EuroCorp holds full global control, using CHIP technology to influence the population. The release of a virus into the global communications network leads to widespread CHIP failures, resulting in the emergence of armed insurrectionists referred to as "unguided citizens." The group responsible for the biological attack is a militant religious organisation called the Church of the New Epoch.

The game's instruction manual specifically addresses the player as a newly hired EuroCorp executive; however, they can choose to control agents from either EuroCorp (to suppress uprisings resulting from the virus outbreak) or the Church of the New Epoch (to seize power from EuroCorp).

The game ends with a battle for control of ionosphere calibration equipment on the moon, which the Church's leaders intend to use in eliminating life on Earth; however (regardless of which faction the player chooses to play as), the leaders are eliminated before this plan can be executed.

=== Syndicate (2012) ===
The plot of the later Syndicate game renames the CHIP technology to the "DART chip", and introduces the concept of the "unchipped", a proportion of the world's population who declined the use of this technology. The game is set in the year 2069 (prior to the original games), at which point, EuroCorp is already an established global megacorporation.

The main story focuses on a specific agent, named Miles Kilo. Kilo uncovers a plot from a rival corporation, Aspari, to begin a war against EuroCorp, before discovering that EuroCorp killed his family, abducted him as a baby and modified his memory. The game ends with the apparent downfall of EuroCorp.

== Gameplay ==
Gameplay for the original Syndicate games involved ordering a team of four cyborg agents around gritty cyberpunk-themed cities, in pursuit of mission goals, such as assassinating executives of a rival syndicate, rescuing captured allies, "persuading" civilians and scientists to join the corporation/church, demolishing buildings, or killing enemy agents. Unlike some games, which either punish the player for civilian deaths or reward them for violent actions committed, Syndicate remains indifferent. The player must collect funds to finance the research and development of new weaponry and cyborg upgrades, such as by taxing conquered territories (in the original game) or robbing banks (in Syndicate Wars).

Notable features of both original games are the use of context-sensitive background music, which changes to suit the mood of the on-screen action, and a high degree of interactivity: many objects in the first game, and nearly every object in the second game, can be destroyed. The visual aesthetic of these games borrows heavily from films such as Blade Runner.

The gameplay of the 2012 Syndicate game did not include the same real-time tactics and strategy elements as the previous games, instead following a typical first-person shooter format.
