= Copernic =

Company producing Copernic Desktop Search

- Type: Subsidiary of Constellation Software (TSX: CSU)
- Industry: Computer software
- Predecessor: Mamma.com
- Founded: July 31, 1996; 30 years ago in Quebec City, Quebec, Canada
- Founder: Martin Bouchard and Eric Bouchard
- Headquarters: 1 Antares Drive, Suite 400, Ottawa, Ontario, Canada K2E 8C4
- Area served: world
- Products: Copernic Desktop Search, Copernic Server Search
- Website: www.copernic.com

Copernic Inc. is a company based in Ottawa, Ontario, Canada, producer of Copernic Desktop Search and Copernic Server Search, desktop search software for home and business, running on Microsoft Windows.

== History ==
Mamma.com was launched in July 1996 by Herman Tumurcuoglu in Montreal, Canada. It was one of the web's first tier 2 metasearch engines.

Copernic Technologies Inc. was incorporated In July, 1996, under the name Agents Technology, Inc.

On December 22, 2005, Mamma.com completed its acquisition of Copernic Technologies Inc., a search technology company founded in July 1996 in Quebec City and maker of the desktop search utility Copernic Desktop Search. In the preceding fiscal year Copernic had a revenue of about $5.9 million and an EBITDA of about $1.8 million; Mamma.com paid $15.9 million and issued 2,380,000 common shares.

On June 8, 2007, Mamma.com Inc. changed its name to Copernic Inc., received a new stock symbol CNIC, (effective June 14, 2007).

On November 17, 2008, SEC (U.S. Securities and Exchange Commission)announced that it had charged Mark Cuban with insider trading. It was alleged that he directed his broker to sell his entire 600,000 shares of stock in the company to avoid losses in excess of $750,000 based on insider information.

On June 30, 2009, Copernic completed the sale of Mamma.com and its third party Ad Net to Empresario, a privately owned digital media network based in Chicago, Illinois. The transaction took place as planned by the two companies and allowed Copernic to reflect the details in their Q2 report. The company proceeded to this sale in order to focus the company on new product offers.

On November 4, 2010, Copernic entered into an agreement with N. Harris Computer Corporation, a wholly owned subsidiary of Constellation Software Inc.

Support for myCopernic on the Go! and Copernic Agent web metasearch ended on January 31, 2014. Another announced product, Copernic Online Backup, was canceled.
