= Herman Tumurcuoglu =

Herman Tumurcuoglu (born October 30, 1972) is a Canadian entrepreneur and educator.

He is the co-founder of Searchreputation.net, a boutique ORM agency. In 1996, he launched one of the web's first tier 2 metasearch engine called Mamma.com. This engine was made as a Master’s thesis at Carleton University in 1995. Majority interest in the company was acquired in 1999. Herman sold the rest of his shares in 2001. He has been lecturing at McGill University and Concordia’s John Molson School of Business.
