= Syndicate (2012 video game) =

2012 first-person shooter video game

- Developer: Starbreeze Studios
- Publisher: Electronic Arts
- Director: Neil McEwan
- Producer: Jeff Gamon
- Designer: Andrew Griffin
- Programmers: Otto Kivling; Fred Gill
- Artists: Nicholas Siren; John Miles
- Writer: Richard K. Morgan
- Composer: Gustaf Grefberg
- Series: Syndicate
- Engine: Starbreeze Engine
- Platforms: Microsoft Windows; PlayStation 3; Xbox 360
- Release: NA: 21 February 2012; EU: 24 February 2012
- Genre: First-person shooter
- Modes: Single-player, multiplayer

Syndicate is a 2012 first-person shooter game developed by Starbreeze Studios and published by Electronic Arts. It was released for PlayStation 3, Windows, and Xbox 360 in February 2012.

The game is a reboot of the Syndicate series of real-time tactics games developed by Bullfrog Productions. Set in the year 2069, the narrative revolves around Miles Kilo, a EuroCorp agent who must eliminate important personnel from rival corporations. In the process, he discovers the evil, secret practice used by EuroCorp to recruit agents. The game features a large variety of weapons, from standard pistols to futuristic guns. Kilo is implanted with a computer chip that allows him to access the dataverse and can use hacking to defeat enemies and solve environmental puzzles.

Pre-production of Syndicate began in 2007. Electronic Arts approached Starbreeze Studios to revive the franchise because it was impressed with the quality of Starbreeze Studios' previous games and believed they could add "style" to the series. The game was returned to the drawing board after a year of development, and the co-operative multiplayer mode was added to the main game. The development team hoped the game would appeal to both newcomers and players of the original. They maintained the theme of the original and drastically changed the gameplay. Richard K. Morgan was hired to write the story for the game.

Syndicate received mediocre reviews from critics. They praised the gameplay, style, graphics, art direction, artificial intelligence, and the co-operative mode, but criticized the story. The game sold 150,000 units, which was a commercial failure for EA. Its excessive violence led to the game being banned in Australia.

== Gameplay ==
Unlike the original series of games, Syndicate is a first-person shooter set in 2069. Players assume control of Miles Kilo, an augmented agent working for EuroCorp in a corrupted, deceitful world where corporations compete with each other for power. Players can run, jump, slide, hide behind covers, and carry two weapons and grenades to defeat enemies and bosses, who each have unique abilities. The game features 19 weapons, ranging from assault rifles, rocket launchers and machine pistols, to futuristic weapons such as laser rifles, Gauss Guns with bullets that can track enemies automatically, and Riotlance Dark Shooters which can paralyze enemies for a short time. Weapons can be customized and upgraded with 87 attachments and 25 upgrade options. These upgrades may alter the nature of these weapons, transforming standard ammunition to cover-penetrating ammunition. The game also features an "execution" mechanic, allowing players to perform melee takedowns.

The player is trying to hack an enemy

Miles has a "DART-6" chip that grants him hacking and "breaching" abilities. Some enemies also have this type of chip, and Miles can interact with them. With the chips, objects, collectibles and enemies are automatically tagged and highlighted via augmented reality of the heads-up display. Players can use the "breaching" abilities to hack into enemies' minds and control their actions. They have access to three options; "Backfire" that causes enemies' weapons to malfunction and backfire, stunning them; "Suicide" that causes enemies to kill themselves; and "Persuade" that leads enemies to defect to the player's side before committing suicide. The game also allows players to locate enemies behind cover with the use of "Dart Overlay" and slow down time temporarily, which increases the damages dealt by players and their health regeneration rate. Abilities and skills implanted in the chip can be enhanced by collecting and extracting the chips of fallen enemies. The upgrades can boost players' damages and increases their recovery speed. Players are tasked with using the breaching abilities to interact with objects, solve environmental puzzles, strip the special armor of enemies and disarm explosives. The breaching mechanic has a time limit and must be recharged before another activation.

The game does not have a competitive multiplayer mode, but it has a cooperative multiplayer mode that pits four players together to complete a nine-mission campaign based on the campaign of the original Syndicate games. Players face enemies that become increasingly difficult to deal with as the game progresses. They can choose from four character classes: Medic, Spec Ops, Assault and Generic, each with different abilities. The breaching mechanic is also present in the mode for defensive and offensive purposes. For instance, they can hack into a turret to disable its armor or heal team-mates using this mechanic. Players receive points as they progress through the levels. These points can be used to research new weapons.

== Synopsis ==
=== Setting ===
In 2017, the mega-corporation EuroCorp is created by a merger between the world's largest corporations. In 2025, EuroCorp releases the DART chip, a neural implant that allows users to access the dataverse, making most electronic devices obsolete. As a result of the DART chip, the world is no longer ruled by national governments, but by corporate republics known as "Syndicates". However, only half of the world's population embrace the chip. The "unchipped" are abandoned and denied the benefits afforded by their chipped counterparts. Corporate espionage and corporate warfare for dominance between syndicates becomes the norm, resulting in the creation of "agents"—bio-engineered enforcers augmented by a militarized version of the chip who protect the interests of their corporate masters.

=== Plot ===
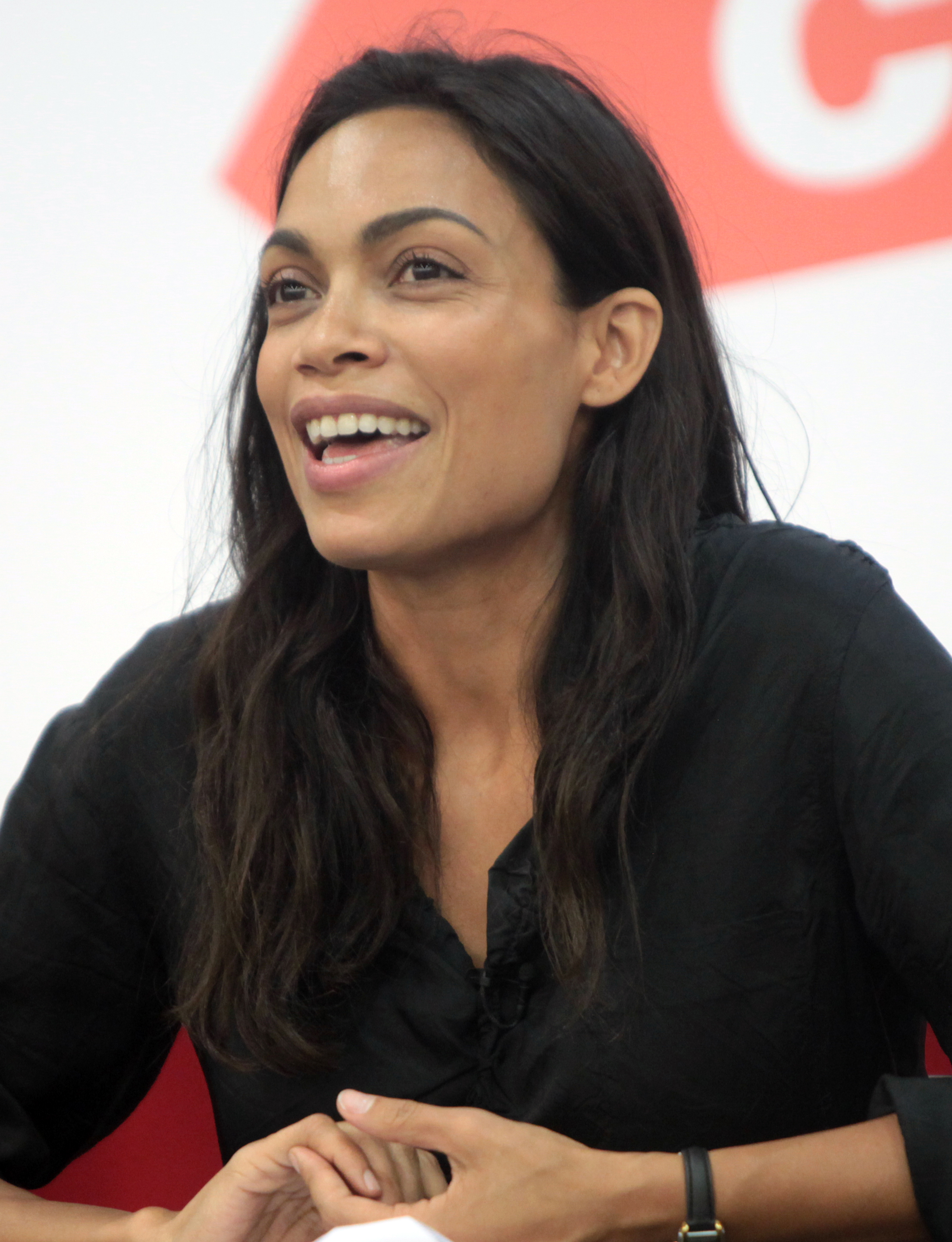
Rosario Dawson voices Lily Drawl, one of the main protagonists

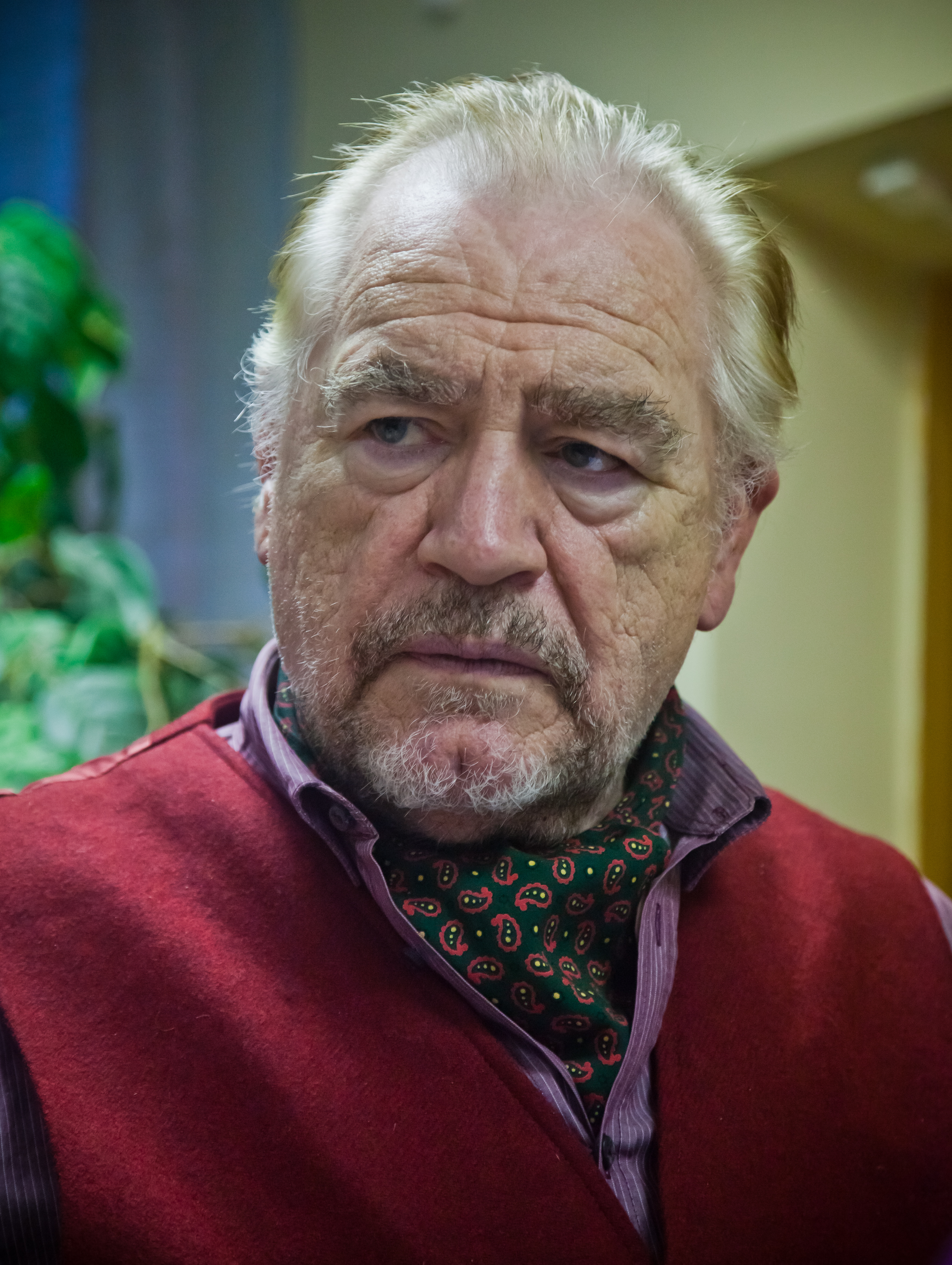
Brian Cox voices Jack Denham, the main antagonist

In 2069, Agent Miles Kilo, EuroCorp's latest agent, is equipped with the new prototype DART 6 chip created by EuroCorp scientist Lily Drawl (voiced by Rosario Dawson). After a successful test run of the chip's abilities, EuroCorp CEO Jack Denham (voiced by Brian Cox) assigns him to kill Lily's counterpart, Chang, at the rival syndicate Aspari. Accompanied by his mentor Agent Jules Merit (voiced by Michael Wincott), Kilo attacks the Los Angeles branch of Aspari and corners Chang, who shoots himself. Kilo retrieves Chang's chip and learns from an encrypted conversation that Lily has been sharing information about the DART 6 chip with him.

Although shocked by Lily's betrayal, Denham decides to have Kilo and Merit keep Lily under surveillance because she is too valuable to eliminate. As they observe her in her apartment, Lily has an argument with a person named Kris before she is suddenly kidnapped by the syndicate Cayman-Global. Kilo fights off the Cayman-Global forces and follows Lily's abductors to their floating base in the Atlantic Ocean. Kilo kills a major Cayman-Global agent and rescues Lily, and they learn the syndicate is preparing a war against EuroCorp.

In New York, Kilo and Lily land in the Downzone where the unchipped, lower-class population lives. After they split up and head towards EuroCorp HQ, Kilo is betrayed by Lily and is sent into a trap with EMP mines, injuring him and disabling his chips. After his chips regain function, Kilo is given orders to either capture or kill Lily. After fighting off subverters, Kilo learns their leader Kris—Lily's ex-boyfriend and colleague—is responsible for instigating a war between the syndicates. Kris reveals he started the war so he could hack into the dataverse and kill the syndicates and their chipped populations as punishment for abandoning the unchipped. Lily, who wants to find a peaceful solution and make the syndicates care about the unchipped, opposes the idea. Kilo fights Kris, who attempts to suicide bomb him, but kills himself instead. Kilo apprehends Lily; he can either kill her or release her. Lily is captured and a barely-alive Kilo is retrieved. (Note: If Kilo tries to kill her, a kill switch installed to prevent exactly that stops him, and if Kilo lets her go, he is stunned by a grenade, severely injuring him.)

At EuroCorp New York HQ, Denham and Merit believe Kilo is brain-dead and send him to be rebooted while they plan to retrieve Lily's chip and recover useful information on DART 6. Kilo begins to remember his secret past: he learns that Denham led a EuroCorp team to kill his parents and abduct him as a baby because he has genes ideal for becoming an agent. Kilo escapes from his restraints and rescues Lily, who tells Kilo that like him, all of EuroCorp's agents were abducted as children and their memories were modified so they would remain loyal to EuroCorp. Lily created the DART 6 chip, hoping to use it to make the syndicates retain their humanity and care about both chipped and unchipped civilians, but she realizes she was naïve to think that way.

As Cayman-Global attacks EuroCorp's New York HQ, Kilo and Lily head towards Denham's office to prevent him from activating the kill switch on their DART chips. Kilo has to fight off both EuroCorp and Cayman-Global forces, as well as several EuroCorp agents. At the top of the tower, he is forced to fight Merit and two other agents, who are under Denham's orders to kill him. Kilo defeats the agents, and overpowers and kills Merit. Kilo then heads towards Denham's office, but finds Denham has activated his kill switch, which starts to affect Kilo's movements. Weakened, Kilo confronts Denham, who justifies abducting him as a child. Kilo manages to fight against the kill-switch order and corners Denham, who lets himself fall over a ledge to his death. As the game ends, EuroCorp lies in ruins and Lily gives Kilo a pistol, telling him that he is free from anyone's control.

== Development and release ==
The original version of Syndicate is a tactical shooter developed by Bullfrog Productions and produced by Peter Molyneux in 1993. Electronic Arts wanted to make a new Syndicate game for several years, but had not found an opportunity to do so. They hoped to bring new elements and drastically altered gameplay concepts that would suit the franchise's universe. They eventually partnered with Starbreeze, which they recognized as an excellent studio for making first-person video games with distinctive styling. Pre-production of the game began in 2007; it was carried out by a small team of staff members after the studio completed work on The Chronicles of Riddick: Assault on Dark Athena. However, midway through the game's development, there were also many creative differences between the developer and the publisher, and the two companies suffered from an unpleasant relationship.

During the first stage of development, the game had no co-operative multiplayer mode. It focused on the story instead of the cyberpunk element. A year after development began, the game was sent for reworking because the studio thought they had not captured the essence of the Syndicate series. The team had very little experience in making a co-operative games due to technological restraints, but decided to experiment with it. The internal reception of the co-op prototype was positive. Testers said it fit with the canonical fiction of the franchise. (Note: The original Syndicate involves ordering a one- to four-person team of cyborg agents around cities displayed in a fixed-view isometric style.) The team had once worked on a competitive multiplayer mode for the game, but thought it was not original enough for inclusion. As the game lacked a cooperative multiplayer element, the developers abandoned the use of an online pass, unlike most EA games at that time.

"Why remake that classic in its original form when it's still out there? So with a whole new audience and tastes in video games, and a whole new suite of platforms to develop for, the game we made was the right choice."

— Jeff Gamon, producer of Syndicate.

The development team hoped the new title would appeal to both newcomers and fans of the series, be accessible and introduce the franchise to a broader audience. They assumed most players would not have played the original Syndicate games. The team also considered that because of the change in audience tastes and the introduction of new video game platforms, altering the game's perspective to first-person was a correct decision. Turning it into a first-person game was the first design choice made by the team, who hoped allowing players to view from the agent's perspective directly would make the game more immersive.

The team aimed to replicate the playing experience and difficulty of the extant Syndicate. Starbreeze considered the difficulty of the first game to be part of the franchise's legacy and was worth preserving. They hoped the new game would be challenging enough for players without being frustrating. They introduced a rarely scripted artificial intelligence (AI) into the game. The AI reacts to players' actions and was programmed to relocate itself after being attacked. The new game has less gore than the older one. Players can still kill innocent civilians, but the team minimized these scenarios, which they thought were part of the environment rather than gameplay elements.

The game was designed to have a sense of unpredictability so it can be played without confining the player to rules. To achieve this, the company included the breaching system, which adds more varieties of combat and gives players extra choices when dealing with the artificial intelligence. The breaching system, which originated as a minigame, was designed to be simple so it would not interrupt the flow of gameplay. Instead of being purely a first-person shooter, the game features action-adventure elements that allow players to choose their progression and tasks them with solving environmental puzzles.

Since the new game is set within a well-established franchise, Starbreeze tried to retain the essence of the world and rebuild these elements. The story was written by British science-fiction writer Richard K Morgan, whom the team approached after they read his book Altered Carbon. Syndicate was Morgan's second video game script after 2011's Crysis 2. He used the original game for reference and included elements that those who had played it would immediately recognize. He preserved the original's dystopian setting and theme, and hoped to use these elements to build a powerful story. Morgan traveled to Sweden to meet Starbreeze's game designers to ensure the story would not contradict its overall design.

The screenshot shows the art direction of the upper zone, which was inspired by a number of futuristic films.

The team's goal was to make the game different from contemporaneous first-person shooters. The team ensured the game had its own style that would differentiate itself from other games. This was achieved by using a "split-world aspect", which divided the game's into two areas, each with a different artstyle. The team added details and aesthetics to the three syndicates in the upper zone so they would easily be recognized and be different from each another. "The Downzone", where non-implanted poor people live, has a different design from the three syndicates. The team took ideas for this area from Mirror's Edge. Both sides were inspired by futuristic films such as Blade Runner, Minority Report and Gattaca. In addition, the split-world concept applies to the gameplay. The Downzone enemies tend to be more aggressive and anti-agents, and some gameplay segments such as the breaching system are inapplicable in such areas. (Note: The enemies in the Downzone area do not have chips implanted in their heads. Therefore, the system is inapplicable.)

Syndicate uses Starbreeze's in-house game engine, which had been modified for the creation of the game. The team used Beast to achieve global illumination and a realistic lighting system, and a new physics solver to deliver more physical interactions. The team aimed to maintain a consistent visual quality on all the platforms on which the game was released, even though the PC version had the advantage of higher resolution and frame rate. The engine allowed the inclusion of post-process-effects previously used in Assault on Dark Athena, such as motion blur and depth of field. Their artstyle was changed to suit the game's overall style.

=== Marketing ===
In 2008, Electronic Arts announced that Starbreeze Studios was working with EA on two projects. One was a new project set in an older franchise of EA under the name Project Redlime. The name "Syndicate" was trademarked multiple times by Starbreeze and EA, and a small portion of the script was accidentally leaked before the game's official revelation. EA officially revealed the game on 12 September 2011, and announced that it is a reboot for the franchise. A demo of the game, which only included the co-op mode and the "Western Europe" map, was released for the Xbox Live Marketplace and PlayStation Network on 31 January 2012. The game was announced and shipped in under six months. It was released for PlayStation 3, Windows, and Xbox 360 on 21 February 2012 in North America and on 24 February in Europe.

== Reception ==
=== Critical reception ===
Reception

Aggregate score
Aggregator	Score
Metacritic	69/100 (PC); 75/100 (PS3); 74/100 (X360)

Review scores
Publication	Score
Eurogamer	7/10
GamesRadar+	3.5/5
GameTrailers	8.2/10
Giant Bomb	5/5
IGN	7.5/10
Joystiq	4/5
VideoGamer.com	7/10

Syndicate received "mixed or average" reviews from critics for the PC and Xbox 360 versions, while the PS3 version received "generally favorable" reviews, according to review aggregator website Metacritic.

The story received mixed responses. The reviewer from GameTrailers called the plot predictable and considered several of the plot points boring. He praised the dialogue for its flow and the backstory presented. The reviewer said the campaign lacked scale, but was nevertheless enjoyable and worth playing. He also said the celebrity-led voice cast had successfully brought "believability" to the game. This was echoed by Jeff Gerstmann from Giant Bomb. In contrast, Martin Gaston from VideoGamer.com said he was disappointed with the campaign and considered it one of the game's biggest flaws. He said the world deserves more exploration than it had in Syndicate, and that the development team did not seem to understand the creative vision of the first version of the game. He also said that the emphasis on morals did not excel because it does not fit the overall style. He disliked the protagonist, who he thought was bland, making him difficult for players to relate to. Xav De Matos from Joystiq said the story is filled with promises, but the overall product failed to differentiate itself from other shooters with similar themes. Dan Whitehead from Eurogamer compared it unfavourably to its predecessors and called it unambitious and uninspiring.

The overall gameplay received praise. Gaston described the shooting as "clever" and said the DART-6 breaching abilities have encouraged players to experiment. He said the combination of the breaching system and gunfights made Syndicate better than some other contemporaneous first-person shooters. GameTrailers' reviewer said the DART-6 system provides players with choices and the recharge time of the breaching abilities tasks players with managing a "micro-economy" that encourages and rewards skills. Both Gaston and GameTrailers said the game missed opportunities for limiting the use of some of Kilo's powers, which are only shown in cutscenes. Gerstmann liked the gameplay and said the control was fun, and that he appreciated the ability to shoot while running. He also admired the breaching abilities and found them satisfying to use. Whitehead shared similar thoughts, saying the breaching abilities tasks players with deploying strategy and make the game deeper than typical run-and-gun video games.

The game's AI received praise. GameTrailers' reviewer said enemies "know how to die in style" and that the boss fights are memorable, even though they can be repetitive. Gaston considered it "missed opportunities". De Matos appreciated the boss fights and said it was fun and interesting, and tasks players with learning the pattern of these boss fights and using the correct skill to defeat them.

An example of the bloom effect, which was criticized

Reviewers praised the graphical quality. Gerstmann said the use of lighting added a unique style to the game. He also liked the depiction of the two major areas of the game, and the sounds, which he said suited the tone. Alexandra Hall from GamesRadar said "Starbreeze really coaxed some beautiful sights out of aging hardware". She added that some players may not be pleased with the bloom effects. David Houghton of the same publication said the game is "a decent shooter", but that its lightbloom effects were "nonsensically over-the-top". Peter Eykemans from IGN echoed similar thoughts, declaring that the motion bloom and blinding light is a problem. However, he admitted the game "constantly looks great", and that its simple design has made it to look very polished.

The four-player, co-operative, multiplayer mode received acclaim. Gaston said it was a "watered down version of Left 4 Dead", but it was nonetheless a fun and pleasant experience for most players. De Matos said the game had encouraged players to work together to defeat enemies and to plan before attacking, which he felt had turned the mode into a "gratifying" experience. He criticized the difficulty, which he said does not scale well, and the scripted enemies, that made the game less dynamic. Whitehead highly recommended the co-operative mode, which he thought should have been the main focus. He added that it provided more freedom to the players than the campaign.

Critics had mixed feelings about the game. Gerstmann said he had an "outstanding time" with it, and that it had offered an excellent twist to the genre. De Matos said it had successfully branched out the franchise to a new direction, even though it may not be what players of the original Syndicate would expect. However, he said the spirit of the franchise is still maintained and preserved. Gaston said Starbreeze was not able to capture the franchise's vision and that the game was not well-executed overall. Whitehead described the game as "fun", even though he thought Syndicate was a forgettable experience that will live under the shadow of rival shooters.

Syndicate Wars producer and lead programmer Mike Diskett criticized the game, stating that it was "nothing like the original games". This encouraged him to make a spiritual successor to Syndicate Wars called Satellite Reign, which was a Kickstarter success.

Despite the mixed response, the Academy of Interactive Arts & Sciences nominated Syndicate for "Outstanding Achievement in Sound Design" during the 16th Annual D.I.C.E. Awards.

=== Sales ===
In an interview with Computer and Video Games, Frank Gibeau of EA said the Syndicate revival had not been as successful as had been hoped, stating, "Syndicate was something that we took a risk on. It didn't pay off—it didn't work." In a 2012 interview with Edge, Mikael Nermark, CEO of Starbreeze Studios, said the game sold around 150,000 units worldwide. According to Nermark, the budget for creating this game was less than those of other triple-A video games. He also said that despite the poor commercial performance, the team was still proud of the final product.

=== Censorship ===
==== Australia ====
Syndicate was refused classification by the Australian Classification Board. The board was especially critical of what it considered to be the game's excessive violence: explicit depictions of dismemberment, decapitation, exposed flesh and bone from injuries, and copious blood spray. EA Australia said they would not appeal the decision or change the game to address the Board's concerns. EA also complained about Australia's "archaic censorship on games" and said Syndicate would be released on schedule and uncut with an adults-only rating in New Zealand.

==== Germany ====
In Germany, an age rating was rejected by the Unterhaltungssoftware Selbstkontrolle. According to EA, releasing an edited version for the German market was not profitable. In June 2012, the international version was added to the List of Media Harmful to Young Persons, meaning the game can no longer be advertised and can only be sold to adults.
