= Syndicate (1993 video game) =

- European box art
- Developer: Bullfrog Productions
- Publisher: Electronic Arts: Mindscape (CD32) Ocean Software (Jaguar) R-Comp (Acorn) Domark (Sega CD)
- Producers: Peter Molyneux (Bullfrog); Kevin Buckner (EA)
- Designer: Sean Cooper
- Programmers: Sean Cooper; Phillip Jones
- Artists: Chris Hill; Paul McLaughlin
- Composer: Russell Shaw
- Series: Syndicate
- Platforms: MS-DOS, Amiga, CD32, Mac, Genesis, Super NES, FM Towns, PC-98, Jaguar, 3DO, Sega CD, Archimedes
- Release: 2 July 1993
- Genre: Real-time tactics
- Mode: Single-player

Syndicate is an isometric real-time tactics and strategic game from Bullfrog Productions created in 1993, and initially released for MS-DOS and the Amiga. It is the first game in the Syndicate series. Set in a dystopian future in which corporations have replaced governments, Syndicate puts the player in control of a corporation vying for global dominance.

The game consists of a series of missions in which the player controls a team of cybernetically modified agents attempting to take control of a particular country. The agents must frequently overcome local police forces and heavily armed agents from rival syndicates to achieve mission objectives, which range from assassinations to capture or rescue of personnel. Agent armaments, cybernetic modifications and behavioral attributes can be controlled by the player to make them more suited for particular tasks.

The player corporation makes money through taxes gathered from occupied territories, which can be used to research and purchase more potent weaponry and cybernetic modifications. The player controls the level of taxation, with excessive taxation bringing the risk of revolt, requiring a further mission to re-capture the territory.

The game was critically acclaimed upon release, with particular praise for the realistic presentation, writing and violence of the gameplay. It cemented Bullfrog's reputation following its early successes with the Populous series and Powermonger, and has appeared on several lists of the greatest video games of all time.

An expansion pack, Syndicate: American Revolt, a sequel, Syndicate Wars, and a reboot Syndicate have also been released. The original game and expansion pack were re-released together in 1996 as Syndicate Plus.

== Gameplay ==
In-game screenshot (PC version)

Gameplay of Syndicate involves ordering a one to four-person team of cyborg agents around cities displayed in a fixed-view isometric style, in pursuit of mission goals such as assassinating executives of a rival syndicate, rescuing captured allies, "persuading" civilians and scientists to join the player's company or killing all enemy agents.

As the player progresses through the game, they must manage the research and development of new weaponry and cyborg upgrades. The player has limited funds, requiring taxation of the conquered territories. Over-taxed territories may revolt, resulting in the loss of that territory and requiring the replay of that mission.

The player begins the game with pistols, progressing through increasingly destructive weaponry that includes Uzis, miniguns, flamethrowers, sniper rifles, time bombs, lasers and the destructive Gauss gun. The player can use items such as medikits to heal their agents, scanners to locate pedestrians/vehicles and the "Persuadertron" to brainwash the player's targets into blind obedience.

== Plot ==
The backstory of Syndicate is contained in the manual, instead of the game itself. As multinational corporations gained power and influence they came to exercise direct influence over the world's governments, eventually replacing them, controlling the lives of people through commerce. One such "megacorp", named EuroCorp, invented the "CHIP", a device inserted into the neck which alters a person's perception of the outside world, numbing their senses to the misery and squalor around them. It also opened the user to suggestion and manipulation by the megacorps. Before long, the megacorps became corrupt crime Syndicates, fighting amongst each other for monopoly over CHIP manufacturing and control over populations.

The game puts the player in charge of a self-named corporation in a near-future cyberpunk-style world in the year 2096. The teams consist of up to four cyborg agents – who, according to the game's intro cutscene, are ordinary civilians who have been captured, cybernetically enhanced and reprogrammed. The agents are used in a series of missions, which include assassinations, infiltration, theft and "persuasion", using a device called a Persuadertron to capture individuals of importance, or hordes of civilians, police and others to act as cannon fodder.

New agents can be persuaded and added to the player's roster, to replace those who have been injured or killed. Losing all agents results in a game over screen, as the player's corporation sets the player's control airship to self-destruct and crash.

During the game, the player establishes worldwide dominance with their established syndicate, one territory at a time, while engaging and eliminating rival syndicates (such as The Tao, Sphinx Inc., and The Castrilos) and putting down internal mutinies. The finale sees the squad eliminating wave upon wave of enemy agents on the Atlantic Accelerator research station: victory declares the dawn of a new empire across the Earth.

== Release ==
The game was first released in the United Kingdom on 2 July 1993 for the Amiga and MS-DOS and to other formats. The MS-DOS version uses 320 × 200 256-color resolution for the planning and main menus, with the tactical simulation rendered at 640 × 480 with only 16 colors. The higher resolution permitted finer detail in the graphics and allowed for the illusion that more than 16 colors were used by means of dithering. Similar graphics and same levels design were used in the Macintosh, 3DO, Jaguar, and RiscPC ports.

The Mega Drive and Super NES versions have new level designs and different graphics. Later, it was released on the PlayStation Portable as part of EA Replay, a compilation of retro games released in the United States on November 7, 2006; this version is the SNES version and is executed on PSP by an emulator.

In January 2012, the MS-DOS version of Syndicate was re-released, packaged with pre-configured versions of the DOSBox emulator for modern versions of Windows. In October 2012, the DOSBox version was made available for Mac OS X. In 2015, Syndicate was available for free on Electronic Arts' Origin platform.

An expansion pack named, Syndicate: American Revolt, was subsequently released in 1993.

== Reception ==
Reception

Review scores
Publication	Score
AllGame	4/5 (PC); 3.5/5 (GEN)
Electronic Gaming Monthly	8/10, 7/10, 6/10, 6/10 (JAG)
Famitsu	22/40 (SNES)
Next Generation	4/5 (JAG, 3DO); 3/5 (3DO, MAC); 3/5 (GEN)
Power Unlimited	90/100 (PC)

Computer Gaming World criticized the lack of multiplayer, random research, poor AI, and repetitive missions. The magazine concluded that "Syndicate is a polished and significant effort" that would appeal to fans of other Bullfrog games but "doesn't quite offer the staying power of its predecessors". COMPUTE! noted, "This isn't a game to use as a morality lesson for the kids – it's bloody, it requires you to be ruthless, and some people may take issue with the use of drugs to control your agents. But it's a ball to play."

Jim Trunzo reviewed Syndicate in White Wolf #38 (1993), giving it a final evaluation of "Very Good" and stated that "Think Blade Runner. Think Robocop. Think cyberpunk to the max! You haven't seen anything like Syndicate from Electronic Arts. This game is for neither for the timid nor the overly moral."

GamePro described the Genesis version as a "clumsy translation", remarking that targeting and maneuvering are much more difficult with gamepad button combinations, and that the graphics aren't clear enough for the player to make out essential details. Next Generation reviewed the Genesis version of the game, and stated that "Often the intense strategy games of the PC domain never make much of a 16bit game and Syndicate is a prime example."

The four reviewers of Electronic Gaming Monthly concurred that the Jaguar version was the best home console version of the game to date, but still clearly inferior to the PC version. They especially criticized the use of the Jaguar controller's number pad, saying it made the controls needlessly complicated. GamePro instead actually praised the use of the Jaguar controller's many buttons, but also remarked that the Jaguar version suffers from a hard-to-read display and sharp, erratic slowdown. A reviewer for Next Generation disagreed with both of them, saying that the Jaguar version is "as close to the original title as is possible without the use of a mouse." They applauded the game in general for its detailed gore and "oppressive atmosphere."

Next Generation also published a positive review for the 3DO version, with the reviewer commenting, "There's been a version of this for nearly every system, and it has to be said this one takes a close second behind that found on PC. ... easily the best looking and smoothest controlling version for any home system." Despite this, he gave it a lower score than the Jaguar version. Next Generation reviewed the 3DO version of the game again, and stated that "Of all the versions we've looked at, this is a close second behind the PC, noticeably better than the Jaguar, and miles ahead of the Genesis and Sega CD versions. Otherwise, it's exactly the same."

GamePro gave the SNES version an overall positive review based on the depth of the gameplay, calling it "a thinking man's shoot-em-up game."

Next Generation reviewed the Macintosh version of the game, and stated that "players who enjoy being the Greedy, Amoral, Corporate Bastard are in for a satisfying depraved chunk of murder." Power Unlimited gave the PC version a score of 90% summarizing: "Syndicate is a strategic action game with fantastic graphics. Like most Bullfrog games, it is slightly different from the rest. The attention to detail is especially commendable."

=== Accolades ===
In 1996, Computer Gaming World ranked it as the 67th best PC game of all time, stating that "it was just fun to mow down civilians in this strategic action game of futuristic gang warfare." That same year, Next Generation ranked it as the 29th top game of all time for being "fast, furious and tons of fun" in spite of its complexity. Also in 1996, Syndicate was ranked as the seventh best Amiga game by Amiga Power. In 2010, UGO.com included the game on its list of 42 best games ever made.

It was included in the 2011 list of the best violent video games of all time by The Daily Telegraph for the reason that "few games have ever been so keen to have their protagonists murder civilians, burning them with flamethrowers, blowing them up with rocket launchers and simply mowing them down." In 2011, Wirtualna Polska ranked it as the third best Amiga game. In 1994, PC Gamer US named Syndicate as the 16th best computer game ever. The editors hailed it as "slick, addictive, and one-of-a-kind gaming."" That same year, PC Gamer UK named it the 11th best computer game of all time. The editors wrote, "Very few titles provide an atmosphere as dark and seductive as the one in Syndicate, and it strikes just the right balance between strategy and arcade blasting."

In 1995, Total! ranked the game 37th on their Top 100 SNES Games writing: "Bullfrog deliver heaps of moody atmosphere in this bleak futuristic shooter. It's gripping and a little dangerous." In 1996, GamesMaster ranked the 3DO version 8th in its "The GamesMaster 3DO Top 10." In the same magazine, they also ranked the game 22nd in their "Top 100 Games of All Time."

== Legacy ==
Syndicate Wars is a 1996 direct sequel to Syndicate, featuring 3D graphics and released for the PC and PlayStation. Several attempts by Bullfrog to produce another Syndicate game were all ultimately abandoned. These canceled games included at least one for the PC and another for the PlayStation 2. The game was re-imagined by Starbreeze Studios as Syndicate, a first-person shooter released for the PC, PlayStation 3 and Xbox 360 in 2012. A spiritual successor, Satellite Reign, was developed by some of the original staff.
