= Syndicate: American Revolt =

- North American MS-DOS cover art
- Developer: Bullfrog Productions
- Publisher: Electronic Arts
- Series: Syndicate
- Platforms: MS-DOS, Amiga
- Release: 1993 (DOS); 1994 (Amiga)
- Genre: Real-time tactics
- Modes: Single-player, multiplayer

Syndicate: American Revolt is an expansion set designed for the Bullfrog strategy game Syndicate. During the game, the player leads a four-man team of cyborgs through the streets of a dark, dystopian world and through 21 difficult missions.

The expansion was packaged with the main game in 1996 as Syndicate Plus. The collection was released on GOG.com emulated via DOSBox in 2013, compatible with Windows and Mac OS X.

== Plot ==
The game takes place during the 22nd century, after the events of Syndicate. The entire world is controlled by a megacorporation called Eurocorp. The company has become extremely wealthy and powerful after inventing the CHIP, which is a cybernetic implant capable of altering the perceptions of human beings so that the reality of a dystopia is perceived as a utopia.

The citizens of North and South America, tired of high taxes and dangerous streets, are rebelling against Eurocorp control to regain their autonomy. Rival Syndicates are using the revolt as the ideal opportunity to gain the upper hand in the ongoing struggle for supremacy. The player takes the role of a Eurocorp Syndicate executive, and the main objective of the game is to stop a massive revolt in the Americas that threatens the very existence of Eurocorp.

== Gameplay ==
PC version screenshot, showing the new air strike being performed. Bombers will make a few passes over the area you target.

Gameplay of Syndicate: American Revolt is similar to the original game, however the game begins with all the player's agents having top-tier modifications and weaponry, and with all of Asia, Europe, and Africa already under the player's control. The North and South American populations have revolted, and your goal is to complete particularly difficult missions to reclaim North and South America.

There are two additional new weapons - one is a devastating air strike which causes explosions in a wide area, and the other is a cloaking device which makes your agent resemble normal civilians.

=== Multiplayer ===
The PC version of American Revolt includes 10 multiplayer missions played via NetBIOS networking.

== Amiga version ==
The Amiga version of the American Revolt data disk was available exclusively from the merchandise section of Amiga Format magazine.

== Reception ==
Computer Gaming World in 1994 reported that "The increased difficulty of American Revolt amplifies the shortcomings of the original Syndicate, turning niggling foibles into serious impediments to gameplay", citing dangerous hidden enemies and slow graphics and gameplay. The magazine recommended the expansion only to "Hard-core Syndicate nuts".

James V. Trunzo reviewed The Syndicate: American Revolt in White Wolf #44 (June, 1994), giving it a final evaluation of "Excellent" and stated that "Like the box says, 'The Future Just Got Darker!' If you enjoy Syndicate, you'll love this expansion disk. If you haven't tried Syndicate, get it and pick up American Revolt while you're at it."

Website Just Games Retro gave the game 3 out of 5 stars, stating that the 21 challenging new missions are made for veterans of the original game, and the new multiplayer mode is a nice extra, however the sluggish interface and basic AI aren’t really up to the pack’s demanding tasks and precision response windows.

Game reviewer Russell L. Webb for Game Bytes Magazine stated: "Novice Syndicate executives, take heed: you'll need skill, patience, a well-managed bank account, and a fist of iron to re-subjugate the American upstarts. For those die-hard Syndicate players looking for a good challenge, American Revolt fits the bill quite nicely."

Game reviewer Andy Hutchinson for magazine Amiga Format stated: "No offence, but unless you have played the original to death, you will just get very frustrated with American Revolt very quickly. This is definitely not a game you will finish the first weekend you have it and even the Syndicate programmers have trouble completing some of the levels." He ultimately awarded a final score of 95% with a verdict of "For Syndicate fanatics with a difficulty rating equivalent to climbing the north face of the Eiger in your underpants."
