= Ahmed Santos (militant) =

Ahmed Islam del Rosario Santos
- Born: Hilarion del Rosario Santos III; March 12, 1966 (age 60); Caloocan, Rizal, Philippines
- Other names: show all: Akmad Santos; Ahmed Islam; Ahmed Islam Santos; Abu Hamsa; Hilarion Santos III; Abu Abdullah Santos; Faisal Santos; Lakay; Aki
- Status: Life Imprisonment
- Allegiance: Rajah Sulaiman Movement

Ahmed Santos (born Hilarion del Rosario Santos III) is a Filipino who converted to Islam while working in Riyadh, Saudi Arabia in 1991. Santos was captured by Military officials for being involved in organizing and planning terrorist activities, including preparation of bombs. He is the founder of the Rajah Solaiman Movement.

== Association with terrorism ==
Santos was detained in October 2005, for taking part in planning bomb attacks in predominantly Christian cities around the Philippines. According to police officials, the Rajah Solaiman group founded by Santos after his conversion to Islam, is believed to have forged an alliance with two Islamist organisations - the ISIL-affiliated Abu Sayyaf and the al-Qaida-affiliated Jemaah Islamiah. Explosives were seized from Santos's room by police on March 26, 2004. . A reward of $500,000 was presented to two Filipino citizens for providing key information that lead to the arrest of Santos.

== See also ==
- List of notable converts to Islam
- Islamist terrorism
- Rajah Solaiman Movement
