= Malacca Straits Patrols =

Cooperative maritime security arrangements in the Strait of Malacca

The Malacca Straits Patrols (MSP) are cooperative maritime patrols conducted by the littoral states of the Strait of Malacca: Indonesia, Malaysia, Singapore, and Thailand. They are aimed at piracy, smuggling, and other threats to shipping, including possible terrorist activity at sea. The MSP includes sea and air patrols and arrangements for sharing intelligence in the Malacca and Singapore Straits.

== Background ==
The patrols were established partly because Indonesia and Malaysia opposed a direct security role in the strait for countries outside the region. After the U.S. Pacific Command (PACOM) proposed the Regional Maritime Security Initiative (RMSI), both countries objected to the prospect of American patrols. Singapore, by contrast, was reported to favor cooperation with the United States.

On July 20, 2004, Malaysia, Singapore, and Indonesia began Operation MALSINDO, named for the three countries. Timothy Hoyt, a professor of strategy and policy at the U.S. Naval War College, places the patrols in the security climate that followed the September 11 attacks, while noting that this kind of multinational security cooperation was uncommon in Southeast Asia.

== History ==
Operation MALSINDO was subsequently renamed the Malacca Straits Sea Patrols. At the outset, seventeen ships were assigned to the patrols: seven Indonesian vessels and five each from Malaysia and Singapore. The first trilateral patrols took place in July 2004.

In March 2005, Japanese-flagged ocean tug MV Idaten was boarded by armed pirates in the Strait of Malacca. Japanese captain Nobuo Inoue and chief engineer Shunji Kuroda, and Filipino third engineer Edgardo Sadang were abducted by the pirates. As a response, Japan offered to send patrol vessels and aircraft to patrol the area if Malaysia was to request for assistance. Deputy Prime Minister and Minister of Defence Najib Razak rejected the help and noted that the security of the Malacca Strait is the responsibility of Malaysia, Indonesia and Singapore only. In June, Japan sent a coast guard patrol vessel to the region.

== Sea patrols ==
Patrolling takes place around the clock. Piracy and smuggling are among the activities watched for, but the participating navies do not cross national maritime boundaries in carrying out the patrols. Each operates in its own territorial waters. Air patrols and other forms of cooperation were later added under the Malacca Straits Patrols framework. Thailand joined afterwards.

== Eyes in the Sky ==
The Eyes in the Sky (EiS) air patrols began in September 2005 on a Malaysian initiative. Each participating country provides two maritime patrol aircraft (MPA) sorties a week. The aircraft may enter the waters of the other participating countries, although they must keep at least three nautical miles from land. Hoyt, regarded the small number of weekly flights as a sign that the practical effect of EiS might be limited.

Officers from the participating countries fly together as a Combined Maritime Patrol Team (CMPT). When suspicious activity is seen, it is reported to the Monitoring and Action Agencies (MAAs) ashore. Any further action is taken by the country in whose territorial waters the vessel or incident is found.

In Ho's 2009 account, EiS was still in its first phase and the flights were being operated by the four littoral states. A second phase was planned in which personnel from outside the region could join the flights.

== Coordination and information sharing ==
The four participating countries established a Joint Coordinating Committee (JCC) for the sea and air patrols. Its responsibilities include communications, intelligence exchange, and coordination between the national forces operating in the Malacca and Singapore straits.

The patrols also have agreed operating procedures for cross-border pursuit. An Intelligence Exchange Group (IEG) links the naval intelligence organizations of the four countries.

Shipping information is shared through the Malacca Straits Patrol Information System (MSP-IS). By the late 2000s its database held information on more than 150,000 vessels. Among other uses, it helped the participating countries check the identities of ships and circulate information when an incident occurred.

== Impact ==
Reported pirate attacks in the straits fell after the patrols began. Hoyt gives figures of 38 attacks in 2004 and 12 in 2005; by September 2008, two attacks had been reported for that year. Hoyt argues that the figures show that the relatively limited cooperation nevertheless had an effect.
