= Syndicate =

Social organisations of various types

A syndicate is a self-organizing group of individuals, companies, corporations, or entities formed to transact some specific business or to pursue or promote a shared interest.

== Etymology ==
The word syndicate comes from the French word syndicat which historically could refer to a group of syndics (meaning "representatives" or "administrators"), from the Latin word syndicus which in turn comes from the Greek word σύνδικος (syndikos), which means "caretaker of an issue"; compare to ombudsman or representative.

== Definition ==
The Merriam Webster Dictionary defines syndicate as a group of people or businesses that work together as a team. This may be a council or body or association of people or an association of concerns, officially authorized to undertake a duty or negotiate business with an office or jurisdiction. It may mean an association of racketeers in organized crime. It may refer to a business concern that sells materials for publication (newspaper, radio, TV, internet) in a number of outlets simultaneously, or a group of newspapers under one management.

== Labor syndicates ==
A syndicate, labor syndicate or worker's syndicate can also mean a trade union. This usage mirrors the common meaning of the word's etymological cousins in languages such as French and Spanish.

=== Worker-managed enterprise ===
In this sense, the term is also associated with anarchist theory, specifically anarcho-syndicalism, in which trade unions form an alternative to both the nation state and capitalist corporations. Anarchists, syndicalists, and other libertarian socialists use the word "syndicate" to refer to an enterprise managed by its workers. Such an enterprise is governed by a face-to-face meeting of everyone who works there, in which each worker has one vote. Either there are no managers, or the managers are directly elected and recallable. In either case, the most important decisions are made collectively by the whole workforce. This is known as workers' self-management.

== Crime syndicates ==
Crime syndicates are formed to coordinate, promote, and engage in organized crime, running common illegal businesses on a subnational, national, or international scale. The subunit of the syndicate is a crime family or clan, organized by blood relationships, as seen in the Italian Mafia and the Italian American Mafia crime families (the Five Families dominating New York City crime, namely, the Gambino crime family, Genovese crime family, Lucchese crime family, Bonanno crime family, and the Colombo crime family).

== Media syndicates ==
In media, syndicates are organizations by name and credit. For example, BBC Radio International is a radio syndicated business. A news ticker, residing in the lower third of the television screen image, usually shows syndicated news stories.

Print syndication distributes news articles, columns, comic strips, and other features to newspapers, magazines and websites. They offer reprint rights and grant permissions to other parties for republishing content of which they own/represent copyrights.

== Business syndicates ==
A group formed of several business entities, like companies or corporations, which share common interests in a market but usually are not direct competitors. Larger companies or corporations form syndicates to strengthen their position in the market. Internet companies and corporations, focusing on various Internet ventures, tend to form syndicates within their own group, with direct competitors involved. In such cases, they share a certain type of market, like brand management or search engine optimization. They may be syndicated nationally or internationally.

== Sales syndicates ==
A sales syndicate is a cartel with a joint sales agency. Such combinations were widespread before the Second World War. The organizational merger of the sales departments of the individual enterprises caused an increased dependence of the cartel member on the cartel administration. This in trend stabilized these combinations. Some headquarters and other premises of these syndicate cartels have remained up to the present via their monument status as historical buildings.

== Finance syndicates ==
In finance, a bank (or credit union) syndicate, often referred to simply as a syndicate, is a group of banks (or credit unions) traditionally lending a usually large amount of money for a specific purpose and to one single borrower. Syndicated loans are loans underwritten by a bank syndicate and are more common in the US, where financial markets are in corporate ownership rather than private equity markets as in Europe or South America. Syndicates have a lead lender that originates the loan and subordinated lenders that participate in the loan. Servicing, Collections, etc. are generally handled by the lead lender.

== Insurance syndicates ==
Insurance contracts (contracts of indemnity) processed under the syndicate form of business organization date to the Hammurabi Code. The notion of insurance syndicate as a process for supplying indemnity was first codified in Lex Rhodia and is still used today as shipping's law of general average.

=== The insurance syndicate as distinguished from the corporate insurer ===
It is canon to the operation of the insurance syndicate that the liability of the suppliers of surplus is several and not joint. This means that members or subscribers at insurance syndicates obligate themselves to a precise individual separate and several liabilities rather of a joint liability. Insurance syndicates are not "incorporated" and may not be incorporated: the US Supreme Court has held in Roby v Lloyd's that insurance syndicates have no separate existence.

Today, insurance syndicates seem present in three forms:

=== The UK-based Lloyd's of London insurance exchange model ===
Some insurance markets such as Lloyd's of London provide insurance coverage underwritten by syndicates of investors who bear the full liability for meeting the costs of any claims. Each member of the syndicate has several liability which is a full and unfettered liability for the costs and expenses for the consequences of the underwriting entered into by the syndicate.

=== The US-based insurance exchange model ===
In the United States, there are four major insurance syndicates that supply indemnity through the several liabilities of their syndicate names - which are called subscribing members.

- United Services Automobile Association;
- Interinsurance Exchange of the Automobile Club;
- Erie Indemnity Company;
- Farmers Group Inc;

These types of insurance syndicates are operated by Attorneys-in-Fact.

== Unregulated governmental and industrial insurance syndicates ==
Typically these arrangements are neither public nor regulated and as such they are hard to describe and attribute. However, thousands of such arrangements in existence around the world where risks are shared by affinity/governmental/industrial groups on a several liability basis.

== Lottery syndicates ==
Lottery syndicates are formed to pool tickets thus increasing the chances of winning. Lottery syndicates are more common in the UK and Europe in general. They are legal in the US, but legal problems are regularly reported.

== Crowdfunding ==
Researchers argue that syndicates may reduce the potential for market failure in crowdfunding, a method that allows creators to raise funds for projects from many different investors through online platforms. Equity crowdfunding allows creators to issue equity to investors when they make an investment in the project. In equity crowdfunding, information asymmetry between the creator and investor may result in a variety of problems and, in some cases, market failure.

A syndicate can be started by an individual, angel investor, or venture capitalist. An individual who wants to form a syndicate creates an investment strategy and discloses it on a crowdfunding platform. Other investors can choose to back the individual, who is the leader. The backing investors must follow the leader's investment strategy and pay them a fee. Syndicates do not exist on all equity crowdfunding platforms.

== See also ==
- Cooperative
- Guild
- Learned society
- Professional association
- Syndic
- Syndication (disambiguation)
- Working group
