= Vietnam Militia and Self-Defence Force =

Vietnamese popular armed forces

Militia and Self-Defence Force
- Dân quân tự vệ
- Logo
- Active: 1935
- Country: Vietnam
- Allegiance: Communist Party of Vietnam
- Branch: Vietnam People's Armed Forces
- Type: Militia; Military reserve force
- Role: Mass mobilization People's War; Naval militia
- Part of: General Staff of the Vietnam People's Army; Department of Militia and Self-Defense Forces
- Nickname: Militiamen
- Colors: Cobalt blue (or teal)
- Anniversaries: 28 March 1935
- Website: Vietnam MoD

Commanders
- Chief of the DMSF under the GS of VPA: Lt. Gen. Nguyễn Quốc Toản

Insignia
- Head badge & emblem

- Flag & ensign

- Alternative ensign & pennon

- Sleeve insignia

The Vietnam Militia and Self-Defence Force (VMSF or MASDF; Vietnamese: Dân quân tự vệ Việt Nam, lit. 'Self-defence Militia of Vietnam'), known simply as the Militia (Dân quân) and also mistranslated as the Vietnam Self-Defence Militia (VSDM), is the militia and uniformed reserve force of Vietnam. Placed under the political leadership of the Communist Party of Vietnam, the executive administration of the Vietnam Ministry of National Defence, the management from the local and national governments as well as the direct command of the local military headquarters, VMSF is one of the three major components of the Vietnam People's Armed Forces, serving a significant role in the Vietnamese national defence strategies and cultures.

Defined as the "armed force of the mass" that is organized as local-level units, VMSF's career is not meant to be "separated from production activities and work", making it a part-time, semi-professional territorial defence force.

== History ==
In March 1935, the Indochinese Communist Party (now succeeded by the Communist Party of Vietnam) First National Congress issued the "Resolution on Self-Defence Teams", being the formal establishment of the Vietnamese militia and the initial iteration of the Vietnam Militia and Self-Defence Force. Since then, the Militia had made contribution to the Vietnamese resistance against the French and Japanese colonialists and engaged in the August Revolution of Vietnam. Since the Vietnamese independence, VMSF has participated in pretty much every conflict in Vietnam, including wars against France and the United States. In the Vietnam War, VMSF is credited for 10% of the total US planes shot down over North Vietnam.

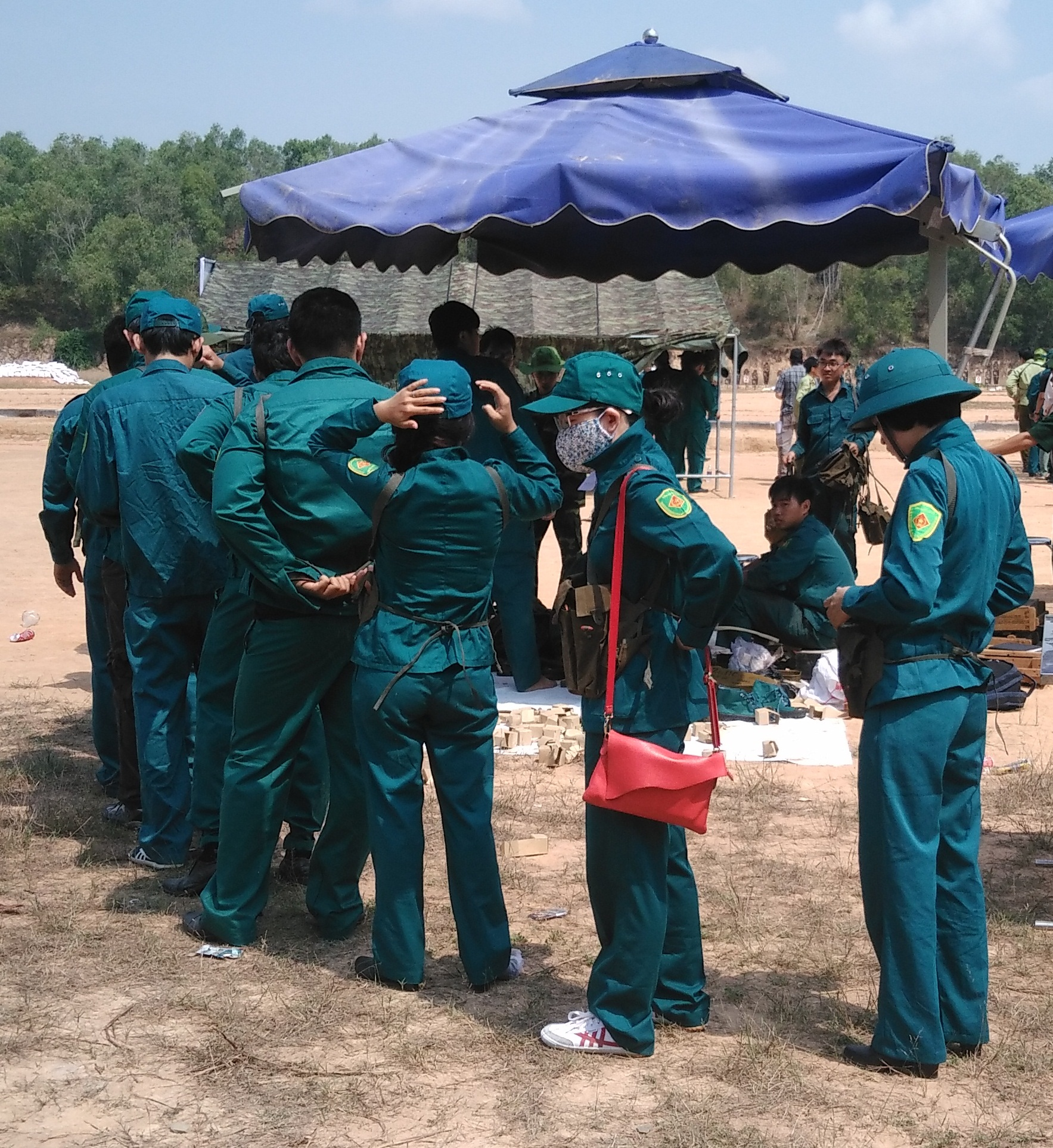
Vietnamese militiamen with their cobalt blue uniform in Củ Chi for an exercise.

== Organization ==
The VMSF is overseen by the Department of Militia and Self-Defense Forces (DMSF; Cục Dân quân tự vệ) under the General Staff of the Vietnam People's Army. Structurally, the militia (dân quân) is organized as local-level defence units under the direct administration of the respective local military commands and governments, meanwhile, self-defence (tự vệ) units are organized in state-associated offices and organization such as state-owned businesses, factories and facilities.

Both of them together form the Militia and Self-Defence Forces, contradicting a popular misunderstanding that "Self-Defence" is the adjective describing the nature of "Militia" in Self-Defence Militia.

== Maritime militia ==
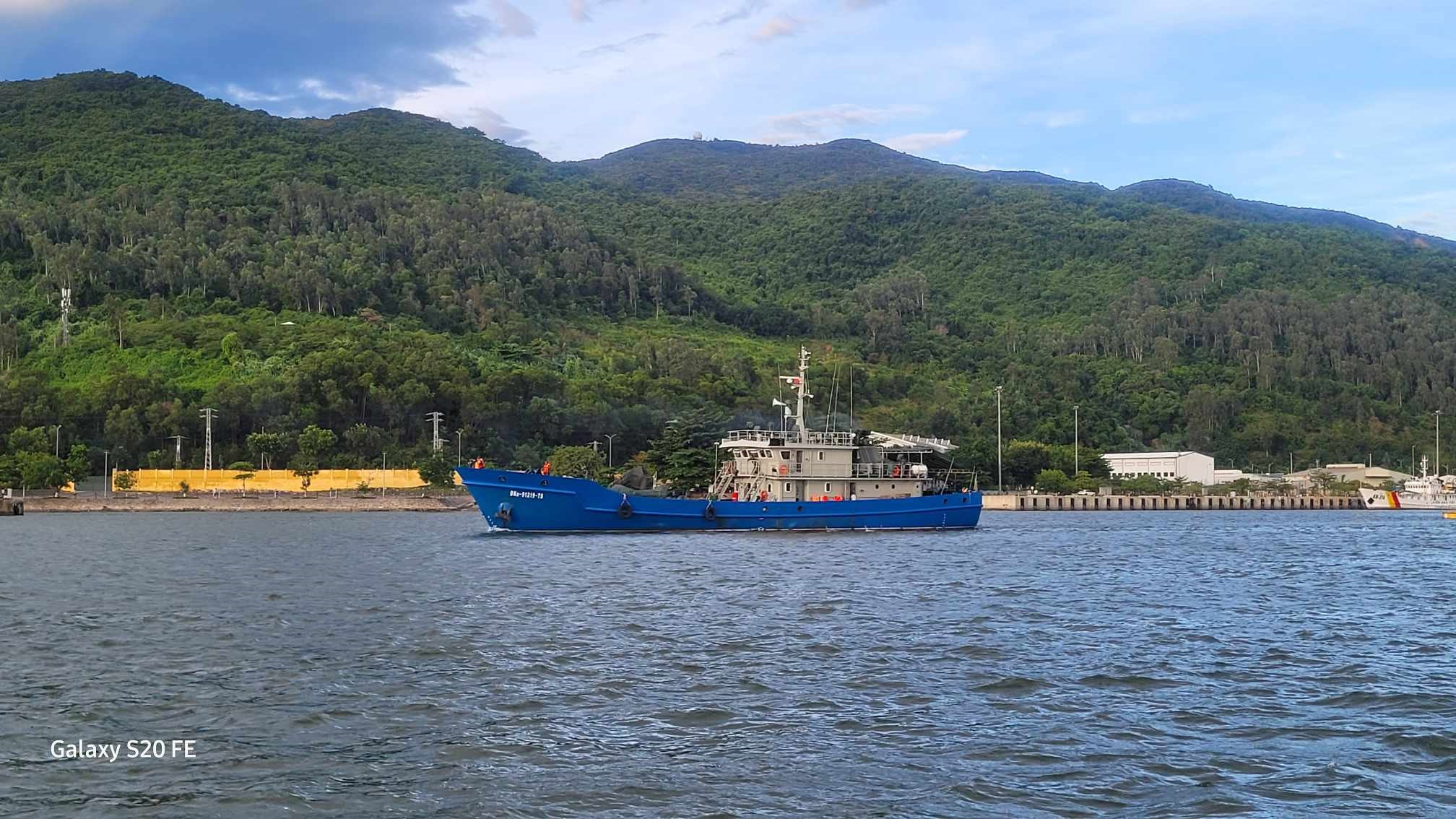
A maritime militia ship of Đà Nẵng flottila.

The Government of Vietnam legally defined maritime militia for the first time in 2009, marking the formal establishment of the Vietnamese maritime militia force (lực lượng dân quân biển).

Officially designated as the standing maritime militia flotilla(s) (Vietnamese: (các) Hải đội Dân quân thường trực) or simply as the maritime militiamen (dân quân biển, DQB), comparable to the casual Vietnamese militia units, they are organized as provincial-level flottillas (hải đội; also translated as platoons or squads) placed under the governments of Vietnamese coastal subdivisions, and are also purposed to do semi-professional defensive roles while "not being detached production businesses".

The General Staff of the Vietnam People's Army has projected to establish maritime militia squads operating steel-hull boats in 14 of its coastal provinces and municipalities, with the first one officially launched in the Bà Rịa–Vũng Tàu province in April 2021.

=== Tasks ===
Even though not formally mentioned by Vietnamese officials, it is widely recognized that the Vietnamese maritime militia is established to deal with China's grey-zone tactics, directly countering the Chinese Maritime Militia and is designed defensive in nature. It was once accused as "black holes" and "potential risks" by Beijing-backed narratives in the South China Sea disputes.

However, such claims were formally refuted by the Vietnamese officials while it was also being challenged by scholars.

== Equipment ==
Small arms
Name	Type	Caliber	Picture	Origin	Notes
K54	Pistol	7.62×25mm			Vietnamese-built TT-33.
PPSh 41	Submachinegun	7.62×25mm			
AK-47	Assault rifle	7.62×39mm			
Type 63	Assault rifle	7.62×39mm			
SKS	Semi automatic rifle	7.62×39mm			
M16	Assault rifle	5.56×45mm			
AR-15	Assault rifle	5.56×45mm			
M1 Garand	Semi automatic rifle	.30-06 Springfield			
TAR	Assault rifle	5.56×45mm			
Mosin Nagant	Bolt-action rifle	7.62×54mm			
RPG-7	Rocket launcher	40mm			Used by the maritime militia on boats.

Grenade
Name	Type	Caliber	Picture	Origin	Notes
LĐ-01	Hand grenade				Domestically produced grenade, based on American M67 hand grenade.

Machine gun
Name	Type	Caliber	Picture	Origin	Notes
DShK	Heavy machine gun	12.7×108mm			Used for air-defense and ground support.
M1919	General-purpose machine gun	.30-06 Springfield			
M60	General-purpose machine gun	7.62×51mm			
RPD	Light machine gun	7.62×39mm			
BAR	Light machine gun	.30-06 Springfield			

Air Defense and Artillery
Name	Type	Caliber	Picture	Origin	Notes
ZPU	Anti-aircraft gun	14.5×114mm			
ZU-23-2	Anti-aircraft autocannon	23mm×152mm			
61-K	Anti-aircraft autocannon	37×252mm			
Type 65	Recoilless gun	82mm			
BM-37	Mortar	82mm			
ZiS-3	Field gun	76mm			
D-44	Field gun	85mm			

=== Vehicle ===
==== Vessel ====
According to Vietnamese military official, as of 2017, there are 8.000 ships that organized self defense militia, account for 1,22% of maritime workers.

Class	Image	Type	Variants	Origin	Quantity	Notes
TK-1482		Armed fishing vessel	TK-1482A/B	Vietnam	Unknow	Also known as Vạn Hoa class (due to the name of the company operate it).

== Former ==
Small arms
Name	Type	Caliber	Picture	Origin	Notes
Arisaka	Bolt-action rifle	7.7*58mm/6.5*50mm			
Type 24	Bolt-action rifle	7.92*57mm			
SVT-40	Semi automatic rifle	7.62×54mm			
MAS-38	Submachinegun	7.65×20mm			
Type 50	Submachinegun	7.62×25mm			

Machine gun
Name	Type	Caliber	Picture	Origin	Notes
Type 99	Light machine gun	7.7*58mm/6.5*50mm			

== See also ==
- People's Army of Vietnam
- Vietnam People's Navy
- Vietnam People's Air Force
- People's Army of Vietnam Special Forces
- Naval Air Force, Vietnam People's Navy
- Vietnam Coast Guard
- Vietnam Fisheries Surveillance

== Gallery ==
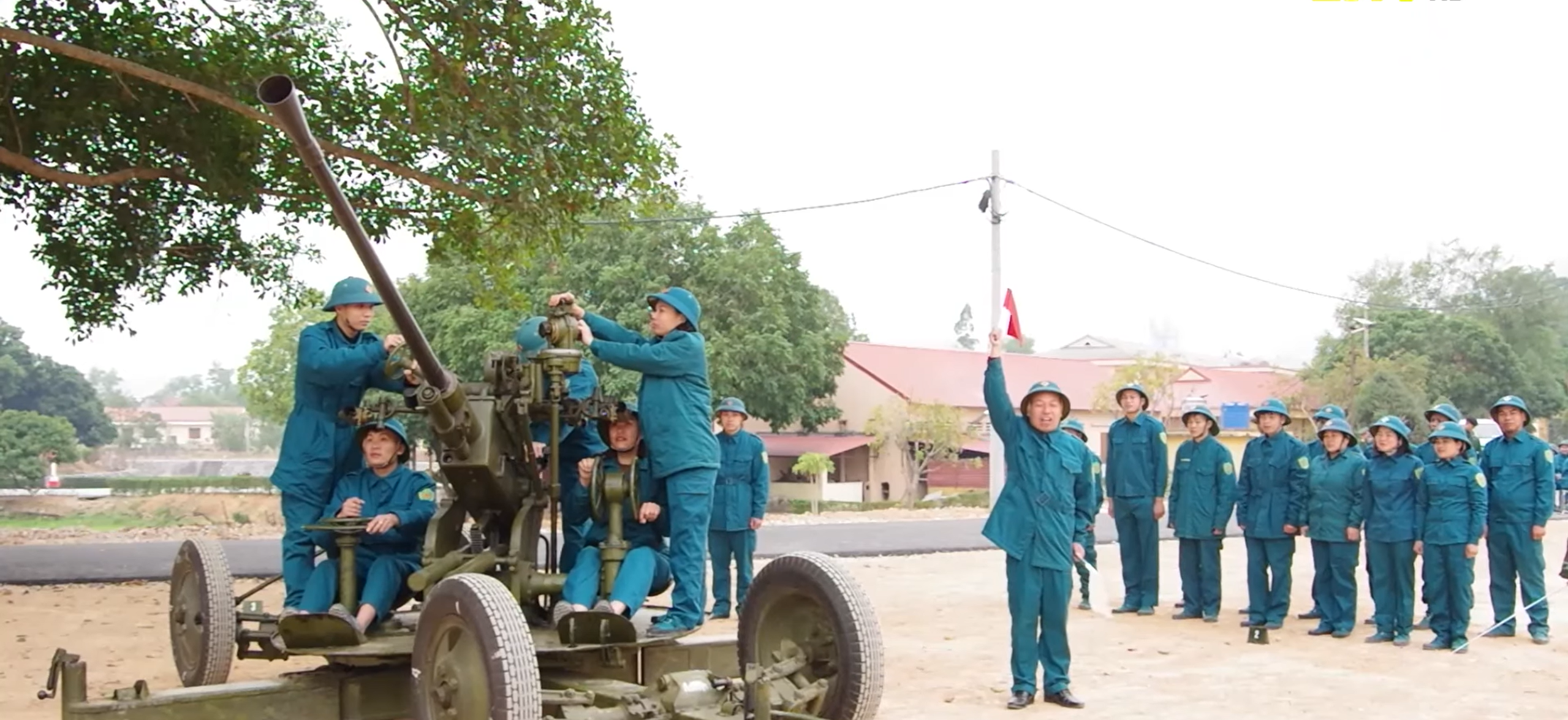
Self-defense and militia force demonstrating use of an AA gun with instructor ready to signal with flag.

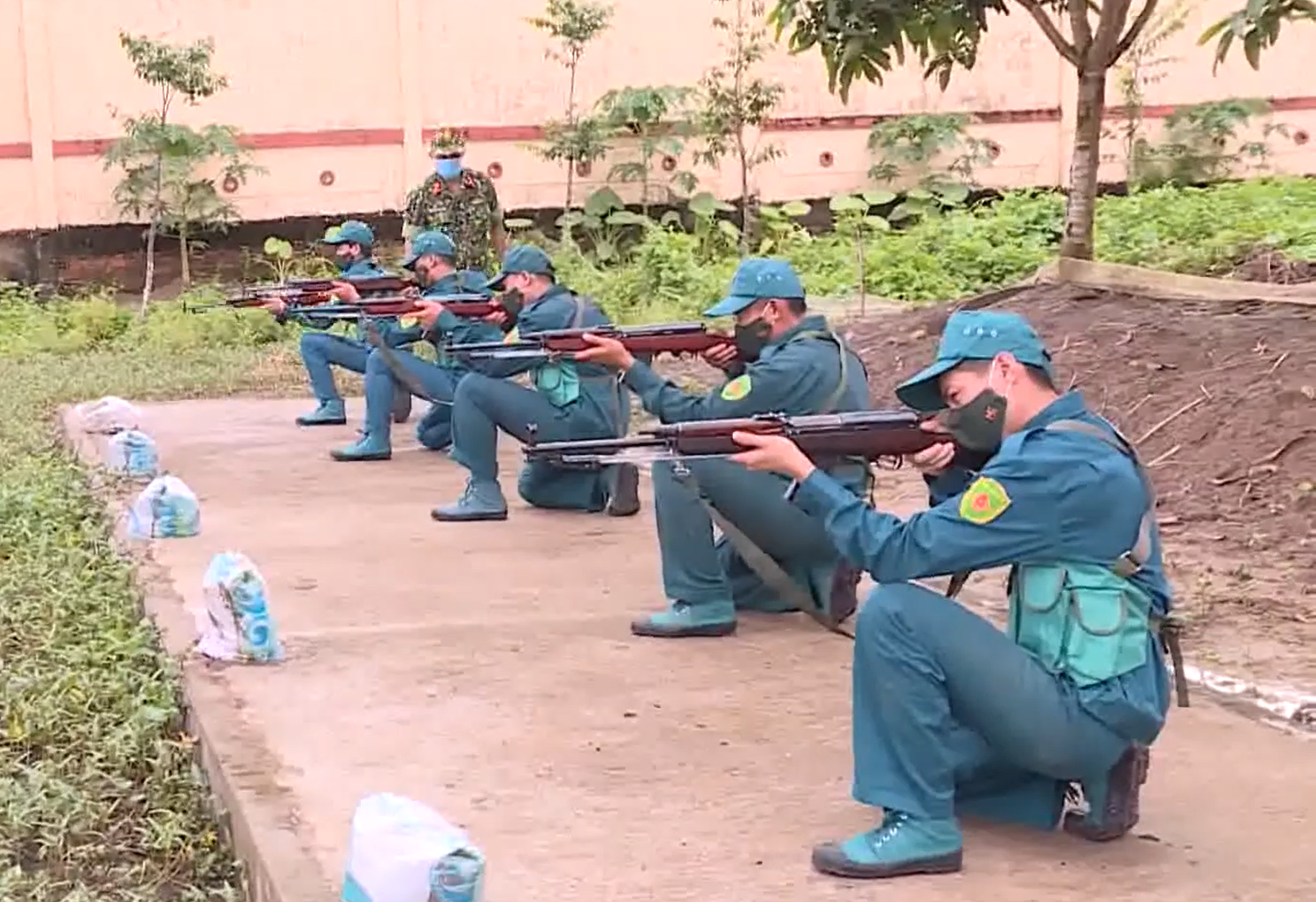
Vietnam Militia and Self-Defence Force learning to shoot Type 63 rifles.
