= Vietnam People's Navy Naval Infantry =

Naval infantry of the Vietnam People's Navy

- Hải quân đánh bộ
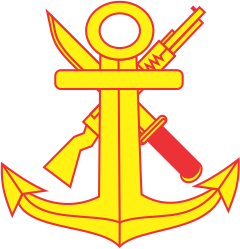
- Active: 1969-Present
- Country: Socialist Republic of Vietnam
- Branch: Vietnam People's Navy
- Type: Marines
- Size: 27,000 (as of 2025)

Insignia
- Uniform sleeve insignia

The Vietnam People's Navy Naval Infantry (VPN NI or simply NI) Vietnamese: Lữ đoàn Hải quân Đánh bộ) are a component of the Vietnam People's Navy (VPN) which is responsible for garrisoning personnel on islands and naval bases, as well as VPN vessels and other maritime/naval assets. The NI is additionally charged with conducting amphibious operations and generally defending Vietnam's territorial sovereignty and territorial waters. The Vietnamese government describes the NI as "marines."

According to the International Institute of Strategic Studies, in 2025 the NI had 27,000 personnel, constituting the majority of the VPN.

== History ==
The NI has its origin during the Vietnam War when in 1969, based on the success of their sapper unit they created two years before, the People's Army of Vietnam decided to formed a 500-man sapper unit with amphibious capabilities. The unit was designated as the 126 Naval Sapper Group.

=== Vietnam War ===
The 126 Naval Sapper Group's 1st deployment was around the Cửa Việt river, south of the DMZ and is suspected of being responsible for the various incursions on the Cửa Việt Base.

The unit first officially saw action during the Battle of the Paracel Islands after the defeat of the South Vietnamese Navy by the People's Liberation Army Navy. As a proxy of the People's Liberation Army’s ground invasion phase of the campaign, the 126 Naval Sapper Group conducted an amphibious invasion of the Spratly Islands on the various islands held by South Vietnam.

After the war, the 126 Naval Sapper Group expanded into brigade size and constited of 950 men, the unit was renamed to the 126 Marine Brigade.

=== Cambodian–Vietnamese War ===
By 1978, a second brigade was formed, and both brigades took part in the invasion of Cambodia.

On the evening of January 6, a group of commandos of 87 people secretly landed and attacked to occupy a Khmer Rouge artillery position protecting the coast, at the same time, 130 mm artillery began to bombard Khmer Rouge positions. Immediately, small patrol boats of the Khmer Rouge departed from Ream military port and others harbors to attack the Vietnam People's Navy. After a naval battle, due to its superiority in numbers and firepower, the Vietnam People's Navy repelled or sank most of the Khmer Rouge ships, while one Vietnamese ship was also hit. Many sailors were injured.

== Training ==
Each year, naval infantry brigades send soldiers to islands, mainly Spratly Island for training. Each trip consited of tactical training, physical training and evaluation through the final medical examination.

== Current mission ==
The current mission of the VPN NI consits of:

- Training for combat readiness
- Station on and defense islands
- Rapid deployment to other islands and reinforce others force when necessary
- Search and rescue mission during natural disaster
- Amphibious warfare

== Current force ==
Two Brigades 101 and 147 are the core force performing the task of defending the islands of Vietnam.

- 101st Naval Infantry Brigade in Vietnam People's Navy Region 4 Command.
- 147th Naval Infantry Brigade belongs to Vietnam People's Navy Region 1 Command, established in 1978.
- 955th Amphibious Transport Brigade, belongs to Vietnam People's Navy Region 4 Command, established in 2024.
