= 5th Regional Command =

Vietnamese naval operations

The 5th Regional Command directly under the Vietnam People's Navy (VPN) is the Naval Operations Command that independently manages and protects the waters of the South of the South China Sea, and Gulf of Thailand in the waters of two provinces, Cà Mau (the southwestern sea of Vietnam Cà Mau) and Kiên Giang.

== History ==
- On October 26, 1975, 5th Coastal Region (Vùng Duyên hải 5) was established under the Naval Command.
- In 1978, the 5th Coastal Region changed its name to the 5th Naval Region Command (Bộ Chỉ huy Vùng 5 Hải quân) of the Navy.
- On January 14, 2011, the 5th Naval Region Command was upgraded to the 5th Regional Command.

== Current leadership ==
- Commander: Rear Admiral Nguyễn Duy Tỷ (former Deputy Commander-Chief of Staff of 5th Regional Command)
- Political Commissar: Rear Admiral Nguyễn Đăng Tiến (former Deputy Political Commissar of 5th Regional Command)
- Deputy Commander-Chief of Staff: Colonel Tạ Quảng Nam
- Deputy Commander: Colonel Nguyễn Quốc Doanh (former Brigade Commander of the 147th Naval Infantry Brigade – 1st Regional Command)
- Deputy Commander: Colonel Võ Đức Tiên
- Deputy Political Commissar: Colonel Nguyễn Hữu Thoan

== Organisation ==
- Advisory Department
- Political Department
- Logistics Department
- Technical Department
- 127th Surface Ship Brigade
- 556th Engineer Battalion
- 563rd Naval Infantry Battalion
- 551st Radar Battalion
- 565th Infantry Battalion
- 553rd Anti-Aircraft Artillery Battalion

== Commanders – Commanders of the Region through the ages ==
- 1975–1977: Colonel Nguyễn Thế Trinh, Commander
- 1977–1981: Colonel Nguyễn Dưỡng, Commander
- 1981–1984: Colonel Bùi Lê Tuấn, Commander
- 1984–1988: Colonel Nguyễn Huy Lý, Commander of the Region
- 1988–1991: Colonel Trịnh Khắc Thuyết, Commander of the Region
- 1991–2001: Colonel Phạm Xuân Nựu, Commander of the Region
- 2001–2002: Colonel Hoàng Thế Sự, Commander of the Region
- 2002–2012: Rear Admiral Doãn Văn Sở, Commander of the Region
- 2012–2016: Rear Admiral Doãn Văn Sở, Commander of the Region
- 2016–2018: Colonel Phạm Mạnh Hùng, Commander of the Region
- 2018–present, Rear Admiral Nguyễn Duy Tỷ, Commander of the Region

== Political Commissars – Deputy political commanders over the periods ==
- 1975–1981: Colonel Nguyễn Văn Lắm, Political Commissar
- 1981–1985: Colonel Phạm Xuân Trường, deputy political commander
- 1985–1987: Colonel Trần Khoái, deputy political commander
- 1987–1988: Colonel Phạm Reng, Deputy Chief Political Officer
- 1988–1991: Colonel Nguyễn Huy Thăng, Deputy Chief Political Officer
- 1991–1997: Colonel Đỗ Xuân Thành, deputy political commander
- 1997–2005: Colonel Nguyễn Xuân Hợi, Deputy Chief Political Officer
- 2005–2008, Ngô Văn Phát, Rear Admiral (2011), Deputy Political Commander
- 2008–2014: Ngô Văn Phát, Rear Admiral (2011), Political Commissar of the Region
- 2014–2017: Colonel Đoàn Văn Chiều, Colonel, Political Commissar of the Region
- 2017–2019: Rear Admiral Ngô Văn Thuân, Political Commissar of the Region
- 2019 – present, Rear Admiral Nguyễn Đăng Tiến, Political Commissar of the Region

== See also ==
- 1st Regional Command
- 2nd Regional Command
- 3rd Regional Command
- 4th Regional Command
