= Vietnam Naval Academy =

Coordinates: 12.2151°N 109.2066°E

- Học viện Hải quân
- The seal of the academy, featuring the Molniya-class corvette
- Other names: HVHQ; Naval Academy (since 1993)
- Former names: Coastal Training School (1955); Naval Training School (1959); Naval School of Vietnam (1961); Naval Officers School (1967); School of Commander Naval engineering (1980)
- Type: Military academy Undergraduate education
- Established: (North Vietnam) 1955
- Affiliations: Vietnam People's Navy
- President: Dr. Nguyen Van Lam
- Location: 30 Trần Phú st., Vĩnh Nguyên, Nha Trang, Vietnam
- Website: http://www.hocvienhaiquan.edu.vn/

Vietnam Naval Academy (Vietnamese: Học viện Hải quân - HVHQ, lit. 'Academy of the Navy') is one of Vietnamese military academies under the administration of the Vietnam People's Navy for training naval commanding officers in division level and commanding staffs in tactical/campaign level, including undergraduates and postgraduates of military.

The forerunner of Vietnam Naval Academy, the Coastal Training School, was established on April 26, 1955 by the General Staff. The school has changed its name several times, including the Naval Training School in 1959, the Naval School of Vietnam in 1961, the Naval Officers School in 1967, and the School of Commander Naval engineering in 1980. Finally, the school was named the Naval Academy in 1993.

After 55 years of construction, combat, and growth, the Vietnam Naval Academy has trained thousands of officers and technical staffs for major specialized fields such as: control vessel; mines - anti-mine; missile anti-submarine; gunship; information; radar - sonar; coastal radar; ship factory and power; the commander of the Vietnam Coast Guard and Border Defense Force.

In addition, Vietnam Naval Academy has trained officers for Royal Cambodian Navy and Lao People's Navy.

== Mission ==
- Training naval officers with bachelor's degrees
- Training postgraduate degrees for commanding officers and technical staff
- Training Masters and PhD military science
- Research naval military science and other duties

== Staff ==
10.5% of the faculty staff have a doctoral degree, three Associate Professors, seven Excellent Teachers.

== Achievements and rewards ==
- Hero of the People's Armed Forces: Hero of the People's Armed Forces
- Military Exploit Order: Military Exploit Order

== Faculties ==
The academy has 13 faculties:

- Faculty of Navigation
- Faculty of Strategy and Campaign
- Faculty of Command Staff
- Faculty of Electrical Engineering
- Faculty of Missile and Gunship
- Faculty of Underwater weapons
- Faculty of Radar and Information
- Faculty of Engineering facilities
- Faculty of Coast Guard
- Faculty of Communist Party Working
- Faculty of Marxist Leninist
- Faculty of Natural Sciences and Foreign Language
- Faculty of Generally Military

And 02 training centers:

- Center for practice and crew training
- National Center for training maritime search and rescue

== See also ==
- Vietnam People's Navy
- Vietnam Marine Police
- Vietnamese military academies
