= Vietnam Fisheries Surveillance =

Vietnam Department of Fisheries and Fisheries Surveillance Cục Thủy sản và Kiểm ngư Việt Nam Vietnam Fisheries Surveillance Kiểm ngư Việt Nam
- Emblem

- Flag

- Jack

- Racing stripe
- Common name: Kiem Ngu
- Abbreviation: KN
- Motto: Bảo vệ nguồn lợi thủy sản Resources Protection

Agency overview
- Formed: 25 January 2013
- Preceding agency: Vietnam Fisheries Resources Surveillance (former name)

Jurisdictional structure
- National agency: Vietnam
- Operations jurisdiction: Vietnam
- Primary governing body: Government of Vietnam
- Secondary governing body: Ministry of Agriculture and Environment Ministry of National Defence
- Constituting instruments: Document No. 209/UBTVQH13-PL of the Standing Committee of the National Assembly on the Establishment of the Fisheries Surveillance Force; Degree 46/QĐ-BNNMT of the Ministry of Agriculture and Environment on the Organization and Activities of the Department of Fisheries and Fisheries Surveillance

Operational structure
- Overseen by: Vietnam Coast Guard
- Headquarters: Hanoi
- Agency executive: Trần Đình Luân, Director

Notables
- Significant operation: Territorial disputes in the South China Sea; Hai Yang Shi You 981 standoff

Website
- https://tongcucthuysan.gov.vn/en-us/VietNam-Fisheries

Vietnam Department of Fisheries and Fisheries Surveillance (Vietnamese: Cục Thủy sản và Kiểm ngư Việt Nam), operating as Vietnam Fisheries Surveillance (Kiểm ngư Việt Nam), and colloquially recognized by its Vietnamese short name Kiểm Ngư (KN, lit. 'Fisheries Surveillance'), is a coastguard-type governmental agency which is nominally under the management of the Vietnam Ministry of Agriculture and Environment. Formally established on 25 January 2013, it consists of both the fully-civilian and paramilitary sectors responsible for patrolling, checking, controlling, detecting and handling law violations and taking out fishery inspection in the waters that are under the jurisdiction of Vietnam. The agency is intended to coordinate with Vietnam People's Navy, Vietnam Coast Guard, Vietnam Border Guard and the Vietnam Maritime Militia to help preserve Vietnam's maritime interests, especially in terms of maritime security, illegal fishing and maritime disputes.

As of 2026, some components of Vietnam Fisheries Surveillance's fleet are reportedly placed under the command of Vietnam Coast Guard.

== Organizational system ==
- Operations
- Legal Department
- Personnel Department
- Planning and Finance Department
- Aquaculture Department
- Aquatic breed and Aquatic food Department
- Aquatic animal diseases control Department
- Aquaculture exploitation Department
- Fishing vessel control and Fisheries Service's Logistic Department
- Technical and International Cooperation Department
- Fisheries Surveillance technique Department
- 1st, 2nd, 3rd and 4th Regional Commands
- Fisheries Resources Surveillance Information Center
- Fishing vessel registration Center
- Seafood Quality Control Center

=== Regional branches ===
Vietnam Department Fisheries and Fisheries Surveillance consists of four regional branches under which there are a number of smaller posts.

- Fisheries Resources Surveillance Squadron No.1: based in Hai Phong
- Fisheries Resources Surveillance Squadron No.2: managed from Da Nang to Ninh Thuận Province; based in Rớ Islet, Khánh Hòa Province. There are three posts: one based in Da Nang on the mainland and two based in Spratly Islands (West Reef and Southwest Cay)
- Fisheries Resources Surveillance Squadron No.3: based in Bà Rịa–Vũng Tàu province
- Fisheries Resources Surveillance Squadron No.4

== Equipment ==
=== Vessels ===
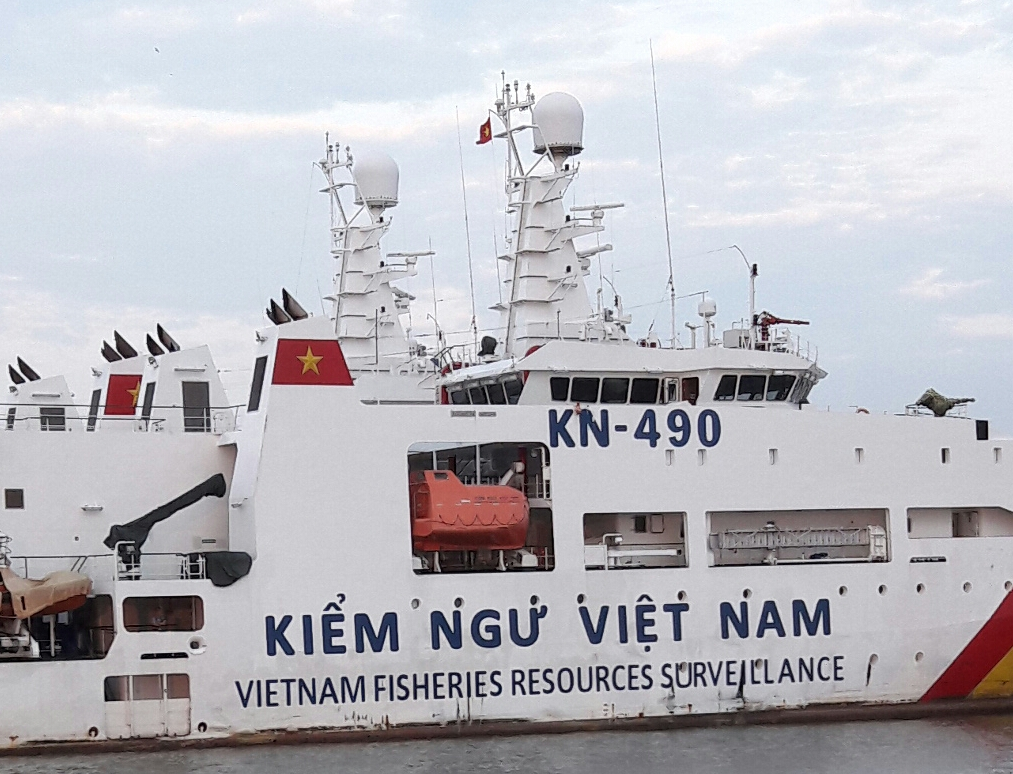
Vietnam Fisheries Surveillance's fleet of Damen OPV 2400 (KN-2011) patrol ships.

All vessels are numbered under the format KN-xyz, with the first digit ("x") of the hull number usually refer the squadron that the vessel belongs to. For example, the vessel KN-290 belongs to the Fisheries Surveillance Squadron No.2.

The surface fleet of Vietnam Fisheries Surveillance
Class	Variant	Origin	Quantity	Notes
ĐN-2000	KN-2011	Netherlands Vietnam	4	KN-290 KN-390 KN-490 KN-491
Trường Sa-class (Spratly-class transport vessel)		Vietnam	3	KN-628 KN-629 KN-630
KN-750 design		Vietnam	50+	KN-26*, KN-27* KN-36*, KN-37* KN-46*, KN-47* Exact quantity unknown One ship, KN-465 transferred to 413th Naval Squadron, 955th Brigade of Vietnam People's Navy
KN-6000 design (a lighter-armed derivative of KN-750 design)		Vietnam	2	KN-168 KN-568
Koei, Hayato, Yuhzan-Maru, Fukuei (converted former Japanese fishing vessels)		Japan	6	KN-102, KN-198 KN-585, KN-586 KN-595, KN-596
TK-1482	TK-1482C	Vietnam	72+	KN-20*, KN-21*, KN-22* KN-30*, KN-31*, KN-32* KN-40*, KN-41*, KN-42* KN-63*, KN-76*, KN-77* KN-8** Exact quantity unknown
KN-3600 design		Vietnam	5	KN-106, KN-108 KN-506, KN-508 (+1 more)

=== Armaments ===
Vietnam Fisheries Surveillance is allowed to use:

- Handguns, submachine guns, assault rifles (noticeably the 7.62mm AK), machine guns (noticeably the 12.7mm DShK/NSV and 14.5mm KPV). Appropriate to be used with remote controlled weapon stations and any suitable ammunition to the armaments, however the caliber is limited at 14.5mm.
- Non-lethal weapons such as non-lethal guns & ammunition, water cannons (especially noted in the Hai Yang Shi You 981 standoff), laser, tear gas & many non-lethal chemical weapons, baton, handcuffs, armors & self-protection gears.

== See also ==
- Vietnam Directorate of Fisheries
- Vietnam People's Ground Forces
- Vietnam People's Navy
- Vietnam People's Air Force
- People's Army of Vietnam Special Forces
- Naval Air Force, Vietnam People's Navy
- Vietnam Coast Guard
- Vietnam People's Public Security
