= 3rd Regional Command =

The 3rd Regional Command under the Vietnam People's Navy (VPN) is an independent naval warfare command that manages and protects the waters between the Central region, from Quảng Bình to Bình Định, including the provinces of Quảng Bình, Quảng Trị, Thừa Thiên Huế, Da Nang, Quảng Nam, Quảng Ngãi, Bình Định including Cồn Cỏ District, Lý Sơn District, Paracel Islands, etc.

== History ==
- On October 26, 1975, 3rd Coastal Region (Vùng Duyên hải 3) was established under the Naval Command.
- In 1978, Coastal Region 3 changed its name to Naval Region 3 Command (Bộ Chỉ huy Vùng 3 Hải quân) of the Navy.
- On 14 January 2011, the 1st Naval Region Command (Bộ Chỉ huy Vùng Hải quân 1) was upgraded to the 3rd Regional Command (Bộ Tư lệnh Vùng 3 Hải quân).

== Current leadership ==
- Commander: Rear Admiral Phạm Văn Hùng (former Deputy Commander - Chief of Staff).
- Political Commissar: Rear Admiral Mai Trọng Định.
- Deputy Commander: Lieutenant Colonel Vũ Đình Hiển (former Brigade Commander of 172nd Brigade - 3rd Regional Command).
- Deputy Commander: Colonel Đoàn Bảo Anh (former Brigade Commander of the 161st Brigade - 3rd Regional Command).
- Deputy Commander: Colonel Nguyễn Quốc Quảng.
- Deputy political commissar: Colonel Nguyễn Hữu Minh (former political director of 4th Regional Command).

== Organisation ==
- Advisory Department
- Political Department
- Logistics Department
- Technical Department
- Financial Committee
- 172nd Ship Brigade
- 680th Coastal Missile Brigade
- 161st Ship Brigade
- 351st Radar Regiment
- Technical Assurance Center
- Technical Training Center
- 355th Training Battalion
- 353rd Anti-Aircraft Artillery Battalion

== Commanders through the ages ==
- 2008 - May 2015, Ngô Sĩ Quyết, Rear Admiral (2012), now Deputy Commander of the Navy (May 2015 – present).
- May 2015 - April 2020, Rear Admiral Đỗ Quốc Việt.
- April 2020 – present, Rear Admiral Phạm Văn Hùng.

== Political Commissars through the ages ==
- 2009–2016, Nguyễn Tiến Dũng, Rear Admiral (2014)
- 2016–present, Mai Trọng Định, Rear Admiral (2017)

== See also ==
- 1st Regional Command
- 2nd Regional Command
- 4th Regional Command
- 5th Regional Command
