= 2nd Regional Command =

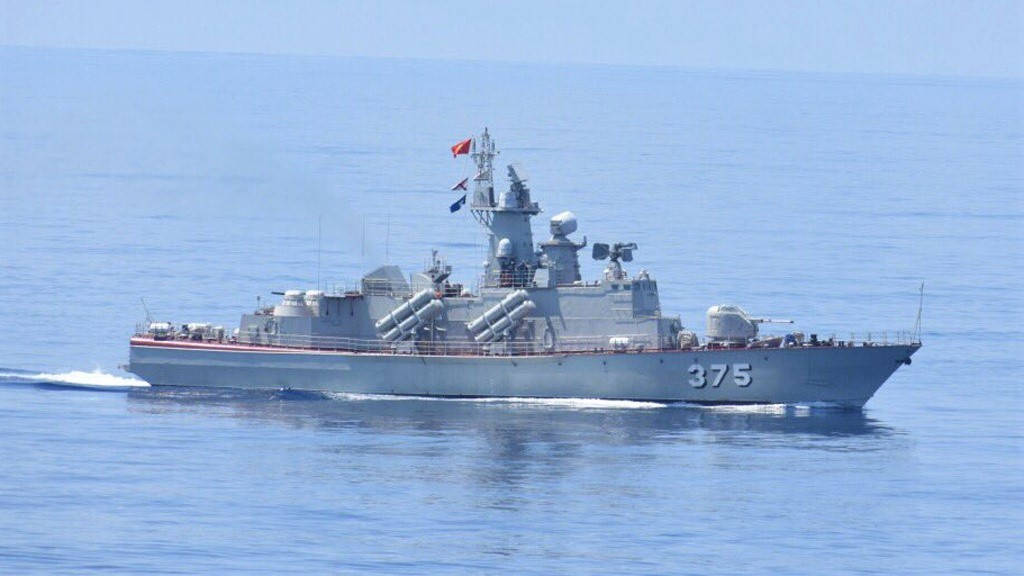
The Molniya-class fast-attack missiles corvettes are the considerable assets of the 2nd Regional Command

The 2nd Regional Command under the Vietnam People's Navy (VPN) is the Naval Operations Command that independently manages and protects the seas from South Lâm Đồng to East Cà Mau and the southern continental shelf, including the important area. The point is the sea with economic – scientific – service clusters (hereinafter referred to as DK1) on the southern continental shelf, including the southern provinces of Lâm Đồng, Ho Chi Minh City, Đồng Tháp, Vĩnh Long, Cần Thơ city, and the southeast sea of Cà Mau province (including DK1/10 rig house in Cà Mau shoal).

== History ==
- On March 19, 2009, the 2nd Navy Region (Vùng 2 Hải quân) was established under the Naval Service.
- On January 14, 2011, the Navy Region 2 Command (Bộ Chỉ huy Vùng 2 Hải quân) was upgraded to the 2nd Regional Command (Bộ Tư lệnh Vùng 2 Hải quân).

== Current leadership ==
- Commander: Colonel Nguyễn Anh Tuấn (former Deputy Chief of Staff of the Navy).
- Political Commissar: Rear Admiral Đỗ Văn Yên (former Political Director of 2nd Regional Command).
- Deputy Commander: Colonel Phạm Quyết Tiến (former Brigade commander of 167th Artillery – Missile Brigade – 2nd Regional Command).
- Deputy Commander: Colonel Lê Bá Quân (former Brigade commander of 167th Artillery – Missile Brigade – 2nd Regional Command).
- Deputy Commander: Colonel Đinh Văn Thắng.
- Deputy Political Commissar: Colonel Đặng Mạnh Hùng (former Political Commissar of 2nd Fisheries Control Division 2nd Regional Command).

== Organisation ==
- Advisory Department
- Political Department
- Logistics Department
- Technical Department
- Financial Committee
- 171st Warship Brigade (formerly Fleet 171st, reduced to a brigade since 1981)
- 125th Transport Brigade
- 167th Artillery – Missile Brigade
- 681st Coast Missile Brigade
- 251st Radar Regiment
- 2nd Guards Division
- DK1 Battalion
- 67th Information Battalion
- Technical Assurance Center
- Regional Training Center

== Commanders through the ages ==
- -2014, Phạm Xuân Điệp, Rear Admiral (2012), Deputy Commander of the Navy (2014–present).
- 2014 – July 2017, Lương Việt Hùng, Rear Admiral (2015), Deputy Commander of the Navy (July 7, 2017 – present)
- July 2017 – 2020, Phạm Khắc Lượng, Rear Admiral (2018), former Deputy Commander 2nd Region.
- 2020 – now Nguyễn Anh Tuấn, Colonel.

== Political Commissars through the ages ==
- Mai Tiến Tuyên, Rear Admiral.
- 2016–2019, Nguyễn Phong Cảnh, Rear Admiral.
- 2019–present, Đỗ Văn Yên, Rear Admiral.

== See also ==
- 1st Regional Command
- 3rd Regional Command
- 4th Regional Command
- 5th Regional Command
