= Vietnamese military academies =

Military academies in Vietnam

Vietnam has 22 military schools training officers for all branches, agencies, units belongs to the Ministry of Defence (Vietnam). Which has 19 schools enroll high school-level institutions, non-commissioned officers and soldiers. National Defense Academy of Vietnam in Hanoi only enrolls military officers have graduated from the Military Academy in middle level. Army Academy enrolls officers just graduated from officer school. Vietnam Military Political Academy in Ha Dong only enrolls officers have graduated from the Political Officer University school and the Officer Academies and other institutions in the military.

Organizationally, there are 06 main Academies and 02 Army Officer Universities belongs to the Ministry of Defence (Vietnam); other schools made regular members of the General Department, the Branches, the Arms and Border Defense Force command.

Depend on the responsibilities, duties and training officers on the scale and properties of military warfare that the Vietnamese Military Academies are assigned as follows:

- National Defense Academy is a high-ranking military academy to trains campaign-strategy level officers;
- The rest are middle-ranking military academy to train officers for the campaign, tactical team-army soldiers;
- The Officers Universities schools are primary to train officers for tactical team (platoon, company, battalion).

== List of academies, universities, colleges and intermediates levels ==
Academies in bold are on the national key university list.

=== Public service units under ===
Academies

1. Vietnam Military Academy, Dalat
2. National Defense Academy
3. Vietnam Military Political Academy
4. Military Technical Academy of Vietnman/Lê Quý Đôn Technical Academy
5. Air and Air Defense Forces Academy
6. Border Guard Academy
7. Military Logistics Academy
8. Military Science Academy
9. Military Medical Academy – Lê Hữu Trác Medicine and Pharmacy Academy
10. Naval Academy
11. Military Cryptographic and Technical Academy
12. Viettel Academy

Universities

1. First Army Officer University school – Trần Quốc Tuấn University
2. Second Army Officer University school – Nguyễn Huệ University
3. Military Political University
4. Artillery University
5. Chemical Defense Officer University school
6. Special Agent Force Officer University school
7. Communications Officer University school
8. Engineer Officer University school – Ngô Quyền University
9. Armoured Officer Cadet School
10. Air Force Officer University school
11. Wilhelm Pieck Military Technical University – Trần Đại Nghĩa University
12. Military Cultural University

Colleges

1. National Defense Industrial College
2. Technology and Vehicle Technical College school
3. First Logistics College school
4. Second Logistics College
5. Reconnaissance College
6. Naval Technical College
7. Air Force – Air Defense Technical College
8. Cryptographic Engineer College school
9. Information Technology College
10. First Military Technical College
11. Second Military Technical College

Intermediates levels schools

1. Ordinance Technical Intermediate school
2. Middle Vietnam Technical Intermediate school
3. Engineer Technical Intermediate school
4. Tank – Armor Technical Intermediate school
5. Cryptography Technical Intermediate school
6. First Border Guard Intermediate school
7. Second Border Guard Intermediate school
8. Border Guard 24 Intermediate school

== See also ==
- Military academies (includes list)
