= Phạm Đức Lĩnh =

Lt. General Phạm Đức Lĩnh
- Born: Gia Viễn District, Ninh Bình Province, Vietnam
- Branch: Vietnam Marine Police
- Rank: Lt. General

Phạm Đức Lĩnh is a lieutenant general in the Vietnam People's Army. He served as the general director of the Vietnam Marine Police from 2006 to 2012 and was a member of the National Assembly of Vietnam.

== Biography ==
Phạm Đức Lĩnh was born in Gia Lạc, Gia Viễn District, Ninh Bình Province. He was the first military officer to be appointed to the rank of lieutenant general in the Vietnam Marine Police.

=== Vietnam Marine Police ===
As general director, Lĩnh outlined the mission of the Vietnam Marine Police at the 7th Meeting of Heads of Asia Coast Guard Agencies (HACGAM) in Hanoi in 2011. He stated that the force would be strengthened to maintain security in Vietnam's territorial waters and exclusive economic zone, while assisting local fishermen and preventing cross-border incursions. In 2011, following China's deployment of the CNOOC 981 oil rig in the South China Sea (known in Vietnam as the East Sea), Lĩnh affirmed that the Marine Police and the Vietnam People's Navy had been assigned by the Ministry of Defence to protect Vietnamese oil and gas exploration operations, including those of PetroVietnam. He emphasized Vietnam's commitment to defending its territorial resources. He also reiterated Vietnam's adherence to the United Nations Convention on the Law of the Sea (UNCLOS) and called on other member nations to respect the convention. As part of Vietnam's maritime strategy, Lĩnh advocated for the modernization of the Marine Police fleet, including the addition of helicopters and vessels capable of long-term operations and large-scale rescue missions. Under his leadership, the force was scheduled to receive a new long-endurance ship in early 2012.
