= 4th Regional Command =

Vietnamese naval division

The 4th Regional Command under the Vietnam People's Navy (VPN) is the naval operations command that independently manages and protects the Spratly Islands, Phú Quý Island, South China Sea and the South Central Coast, from Phú Yên to the North Bình Thuận including the provinces: Phú Yên, Khánh Hòa, Ninh Thuận and the North of Bình Thuận. Its headquarter is in the Cam Ranh Bay Navy Base.

== History ==
- On October 26, 1975, 4th Coastal Region (Vùng Duyên hải 4) was established under the Naval Command.
- In 1978, 4th Coastal Region changed its name to Naval Region 4 Command (Bộ Chỉ huy Vùng 4 Hải quân) of the Navy.
- On January 14, 2011, the Naval Region 4 Command was upgraded to the 4th Regional Command.(Bộ Tư lệnh vùng 4 Hải Quân)

== Current leadership ==
- Commander: Colonel Nguyễn Đình Hùng (former Deputy Commander – Chief of Staff of 4th Regional Command).
- Political Commissar: Rear Admiral Ngô Văn Thuân (former Vice Chairman of Political Affairs of the Navy).
- Deputy Commander – Chief of Staff: Colonel Nguyễn Thiên Quân (former commander of 162nd Brigade – 4th Regional Command).
- Deputy Commander: Colonel Hoàng Lương Ngọc (former Brigade Commander of 189th Brigade – Naval Service).
- Deputy Commander: Colonel Vi Đức Thanh (former Brigade Commander of 957th Brigade – 4th Regional Command).
- Deputy Political Commissar: Colonel Lã Văn Hùng (former Political Commissar of 170th Brigade – 1st Regional Command).

== Organisation ==
- Advisory Department
- Political Department
- Logistics Department
- Technical Department
- Financial Committee
- Command Office
- 957th Defensive Brigade
- 101st Naval Infantry Brigade
- 162nd Warship Brigade
- 146th Spratly Defensive Brigade
- 719th Technical Guarantee Center
- 955th Transport Landing Ship Brigade
- Regional Training Center
- 682nd Shore Missile Brigade
- 685th Shore Missile Brigade
- 954th Naval Air Brigade (belongs to VPN Command)
- 451st Radar Regiment
- 455th Information Battalion
- 458th Guards Battalion
- 1st Engineer Battalion
- 872nd Air Defense Battalion
- 189th Submarine Brigade

== Bonus ==
- Second Class Fatherland Defense Order (2010)

== Commanders through the ages ==
- 1994–1998, Phạm Đức Lĩnh, Colonel.
- 1998–2000, Nguyễn Văn Hiến, Colonel.
- 2000–2002, Phạm Đức Lĩnh, Colonel.
- 2002–2009, Nguyễn Viết Nhiên, Colonel.
- 2009–2012, Ngô Quang Tiến, Rear Admiral.
- 2012–2014, Phạm Hoài Nam, Colonel, Rear Admiral, now Deputy Minister of Defense of Vietnam.
- 2014–2018, Phạm Văn Hoành, Rear Admiral.
- 2018–2019, Trần Thanh Nghiêm, Rear Admiral (2019), now Deputy Commander and Chief of Staff of the Navy.
- 2019 – June 2020, Phan Tuấn Hùng, Rear Admiral (2019), former Deputy Chief of Staff of the Navy, former Deputy Commander – Chief of Staff of the 4th Regional Command.
- June 21, 2020–present: Nguyễn Đình Hùng, Colonel, former Deputy Commander and Chief of Staff of 4th Regional Command.

== Political Commissars through the ages ==
- 2009–2012: Đặng Minh Hải, Rear Admiral.
- 2012–2017: Phạm Thanh Hóa, Rear Admiral.
- 2017 – February 2020, Nguyễn Đức Vượng, Rear Admiral.
- February 25, 2020–present:huân, Rear Admiral.

== See also ==
- 1st Regional Command.
- 2nd Regional Command.
- 3rd Regional Command.
- 5th Regional Command.
