= Naval Air Force, Vietnam People's Navy =

Naval aviation branch of the Vietnam People's Navy

Naval Air Force
- Không quân Hải quân
- Insignia
- Active: 24 July 1986
- Country: Vietnam
- Part of: Vietnam People's Navy
- Anniversaries: 24 July (the establishment of the Naval Air Defense – Air Force)

Insignia
- Sleeve patch

- Roundel (former)

Aircraft flown
- Attack helicopter: Kamov Ka-28
- Cargo helicopter: Kamov Ka-32, Eurocopter AS365 Dauphin, Aérospatiale SA 330 Puma, Eurocopter AS332 Super Puma
- Observation helicopter: Eurocopter EC225 Super Puma
- Patrol: De Havilland Canada DHC-6 Twin Otter

The Naval Air Force (Vietnamese: Không quân Hải quân, lit. 'Air Force of the Navy') is a virtual combat arm (binh chủng) and the aviation component of the Vietnam People's Navy with the primary function to perform tasks at sea or along the coast and islands by means of the air force such as aircraft combat aircraft, transport helicopters and patrol aircraft, etc. The component was once under Vietnam People's Air Force, before being transferred to the Vietnam People's Navy for better combat coordinations. The Naval Air Force Brigade 954 (Lữ đoàn Không quân Hải quân 954) is currently the only unit of the Naval Air Force.

The traditional day is 24 July (the establishment of the Naval Air Defense – Air Force (Binh chủng Phòng không – Không quân Hải quân)).

Date of establishment of the first official unit: 3 July (the date the 954th Naval Aviation Brigade was returned to the Navy by the Air Force).

== Formation ==
Although the Navy branch of the People's Army of Vietnam was established in 1955 after the end of the Indochina War, but due to the Vietnam War broke out and the United States bombing campaign in northern Vietnam like Operation Rolling Thunder, the Navy at that time did not have its own air wing.

After the Vietnam War ended, the Vietnam People's Navy gradually regularized and established many new forces and branches following the model of the Soviet Navy, including the naval aviation. On 24 July 1986, the Navy Commander issued Decision No. 1253/B0-31 on the establishment of the Air Defense – Air Force Department on the basis of merging the Naval Air Defense Department and the Naval Air Force Department.

After established, some Vietnamese naval soldiers were selected to go to the Soviet Union to train in the use of new weapons of the armed services. In the 1980s, the Vietnam Naval Aviation received 12 Soviet Kamov Ka-25 submarine-hunting helicopters.

In late 1980s, the Vietnam Naval Aviation continued to receive 4 Beriev Be-12 submarine-hunting seaplanes. The Be-12 squadron and the Sukhoi Su-22 of the Vietnam People's Air Force often patrolled in the Spratly Islands.

Vietnam continuted to received new aircraft like the Kamov Ka-27PL anti-submarine helicopters from the Soviet Union. After the Soviet Union collapse, Vietnam no longer received aid but continued to receive modern Kamov Ka-28 anti-submarine helicopters through purchase from Russia. Currently, Kamov Ka-28 is the main anti-submarine weapon of the Naval Aviation force. In addition, Vietnam also purchased 10 Kamov Ka-32T helicopters designed similar to Ka-25/28 but for transport and rescue purposes.

After the United States Department of State withdrew the ban on exporting military helicopters to Vietnam through the long-term lobbying of the Executive Decision Export Services Group, the Ministry of Defence of Vietnam purchased many helicopters from Eurocopter (France) to equip the armed service. In 2011, the Vietnam People's Navy received a fleet of Eurocopter EC225 Super Puma transport-reconnaissance helicopters for the Navy.

On 17 August 2012, the Navy held a groundbreaking ceremony for the construction of the Naval Aviation Regiment infrastructure project at Cam Ranh Airport, Khánh Hoà Province.

In 2010, the Vietnamese Ministry of Defense ordered six De Havilland Canada DHC-6 Twin Otter maritime patrol aircraft from Canada. The Navy has decided to send 12 pilots to Canada for training for a period of 17 months to enhance the ability to patrol at sea.

On 3 July, at the 372nd Airborne Division (Đoàn Hải Vân), the Ministry of Defense held a ceremony to hand over the 954th Airborne Brigade (formerly known as the 954th Helicopter Regiment) from the Vietnam People's Air Force to the Navy and announced the decision to establish the 930th Helicopter Regiment stationed at Da Nang International Airport, under 372nd Division (Vietnam People's Air Force). The 930th Regiment was established to replace the 954th Regiment transferred to the People's Navy. The regiment has the duty of observation flight; reconnaissance; in charge of military transport in the central region – the Central Highlands and the southern Gulf of Tonkin; transport Communist Party of Vietnam, State and Army leaders; participate in search and rescue mission during natural disater; provide air support; organize conversion flight training for students of helicopter pilots of the Air Force Officer's College.

== Equipment ==
Aircraft	Image	Origin	Type	Variant	In service	Notes
Maritime Patrol
DHC-6 Twin Otter		Canada	MPA / transport	Guardian 400	6	
Helicopter
Eurocopter EC225 Super Puma		France	utility		2	Operating with Vietnam Helicopters
Kamov Ka-27		Russia	ASW	Ka-28	10	
Kamov Ka-32		Russia	utility	Ka-32C	2	

The Kamov Ka-25 and Beriev Be-12 squadrons were decommissioned due to their aging.

== Uniform ==
Airmen of the Navy wear the Navy uniform and rank, with the air force insignia. They also wearing standard Air Force pilot uniform when performing mission.

== See also ==
- People's Army of Vietnam
- Vietnam People's Navy
- Vietnam People's Air Force
- People's Army of Vietnam Special Forces
- Vietnam Coast Guard
- Vietnam People's Public Security
- Vietnam Fisheries Surveillance
