= 1st Regional Command =

The 1st Regional Command under the Vietnam People's Navy (VPN) is an independent naval warfare command that manages and protects the waters from Quảng Ninh to Hà Tĩnh and the islands in the Gulf of Tonkin, including the Quảng Ninh provinces, Haiphong, Thái Bình, Nam Định, Ninh Bình, Thanh Hóa, Nghệ An, Hà Tĩnh.

== History ==
- On October 26, 1975, 1st Coastal Region (Vùng Duyên hải 1) was established under the Naval Command.
- In 1978, Coastal Region 1 changed its name to 1st Naval Region Command of the Navy (Bộ Chỉ huy Vùng 1 Hải quân).
- On 14 January 2011, the 1st Naval Region Command was upgraded to the 1st Regional Command (Bộ Tư lệnh Vùng 1 Hải quân).

== Current leadership ==
- Commander: Rear Admiral Nguyễn Viết Khánh (former Deputy Commander - Chief of Staff of 1st Regional Command).
- Political Commissar: Colonel Hồ Thanh Hoàn (former Deputy Political Commissar of 1st Regional Command).
- Deputy Commander - Chief of Staff: Colonel Lê Đình Cường.
- Deputy Commander: Colonel Vũ Đình Duẩn (former Deputy Chief of Staff of 1st Regional Command).
- Deputy Commander: Colonel Phan Tiến Bảo.
- Deputy Political Commissar: Colonel Trần Xuân Văn.

== Organisation ==
- Advisory Department
- Political Department
- Logistics Department
- Technical Department
- Financial Committee
- 170th Warship Brigade
- 679th Shore Missile Brigade
- 147th Naval Infantry Brigade
- 137th Squadron
- 4th Squadron
- 151st Shore Radar Battalion
- 158th Battalion
- 703rd Warehouse

== Bonus ==
- Third-class Fatherland Defense Order (2010)

== Commander through the ages ==
- 1985, Phạm Minh, Rear Admiral (1991)
- 1991, Quách Văn Nấu, Colonel (2010)
- Trần Đình Xuyên, Colonel (2008)
- 2010-2015, Phạm Văn Điển, Rear Admiral (2011)
- 2015-2016, Nguyễn Trọng Bình, Rear Admiral
- 2016-2019, Trần Ngọc Quyết, Rear Admiral
- 2019-present, Nguyễn Viết Khánh, Colonel

== Politics through the ages ==
- 1977-1980 Colonel Cao Xuân Ấn (Hà Tĩnh)
- 1980-1983 Colonel Lê Nguyên Tham (Hà Nam)
- 2009-2014, Phạm Văn Sơn, Rear Admiral
- 2014-2016, Phạm Văn Vững, Rear Admiral
- 2016-2019, Phạm Văn Quang, Rear Admiral
- 2019-present, Hồ Thanh Hoàn, Colonel

== See also ==
- 2nd Regional Command.
- 3rd Regional Command.
- 4th Regional Command.
- 5th Regional Command.
