= Vietnam Coast Guard =

Vietnam Coast Guard Cảnh sát biển Việt Nam
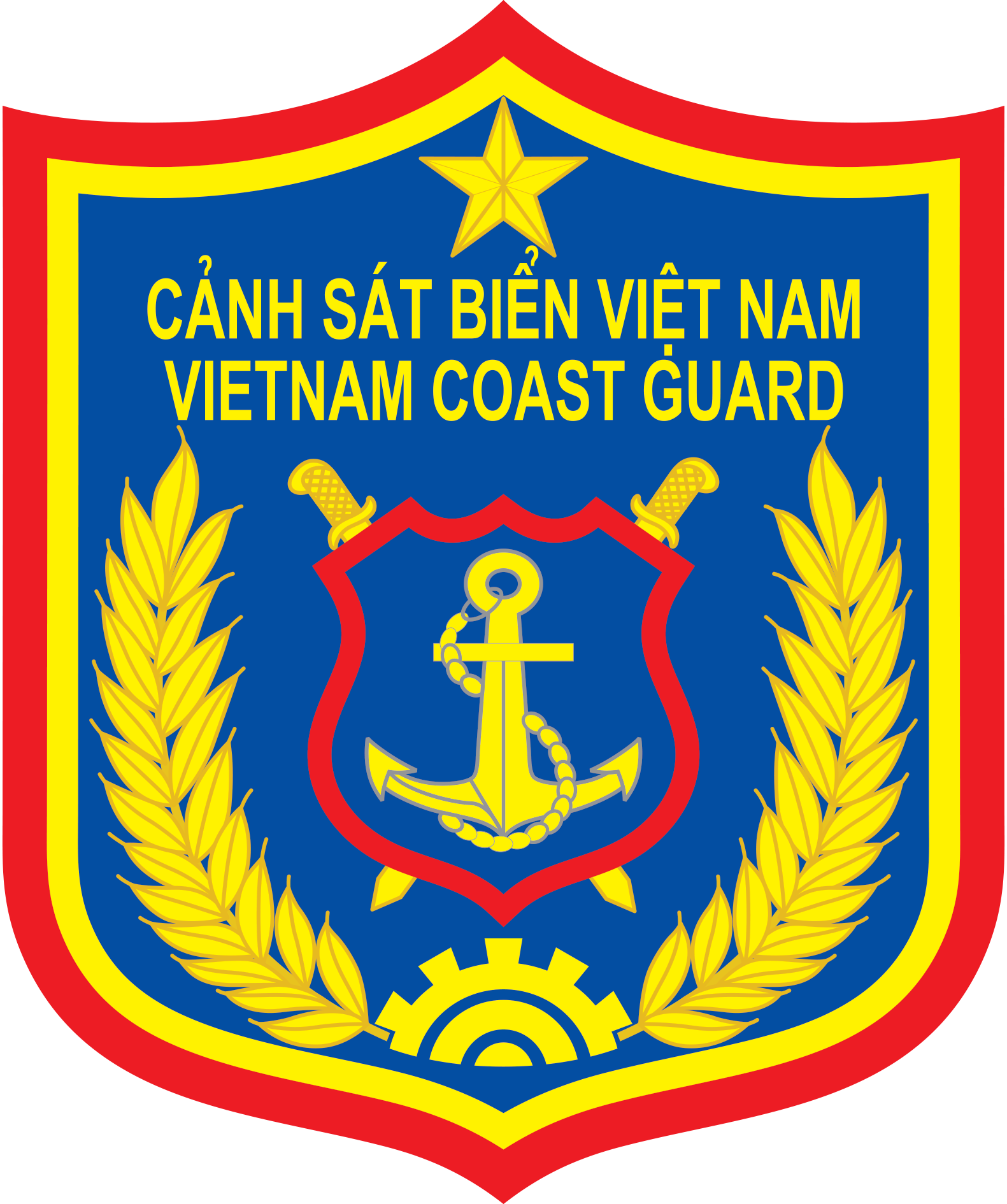
- Logo

- Emblem/Cap badge

- Badge on personnel's uniform

- Ensign
- Common name: Cảnh sát biển, Coast Guard, Vietnamese Coastguard
- Abbreviation: VCG / VNCG / CSBVN

Agency overview
- Formed: 28 August 1998 (as Vietnam Marine Police)
- Preceding agency: Vietnam Marine Police (former name)

Jurisdictional structure
- Operations jurisdiction: SRV
- Legal jurisdiction: Vietnam People's Armed Forces
- Governing body: Vietnam Ministry of National Defence
- Constituting instruments: Ordinance No. 04/1998/PL-UBTVQH10 of the Standing Committee of the National Assembly of Vietnam on the Marine Police of Vietnam; 2018 Vietnam Coast Guard Law
- Specialist jurisdiction: Coastal patrol, marine border protection, marine search and rescue

Operational structure
- Overseen by Direct governing body: Vietnam Coast Guard Command
- Headquarters: Hanoi
- Agency executives: Major General Lê Đình Cường, Commander; Lieutenant General Bùi Quốc Oai, Political Commissar; Major General Trần Văn Lượng, Chief of Staff
- Parent agency: Vietnam People's Navy (1998-2008); Ministry of National Defence (2008-now)

Facilities
- Patrol boats: 50+ patrol boats 6+ offshore patrol vessel 6 transport and logistics vessels with capability to engage in any patrol or SAR missions
- Salvage tug/ Tugboats: 9 Tugboat/Salvage tugs
- Rescue boats: 4 search and rescue ship
- Patrol aircraft: 2 CASA C-212 Aviocar

Notables
- Significant operation: MT Zafirah hijacking; MT Orkim Harmony hijacking; Hai Yang Shi You 981 standoff; Search for Malaysia Airlines Flight 370
- Anniversary: 28 August

Website
- canhsatbien.vn
- Colours: Blue, White, Orange Military flag Wordmark & Decorations Racing stripes

Vietnam Coast Guard (VCG or VNCG for the alternative spelling Viet Nam Coast Guard; Vietnamese: Cảnh sát biển Việt Nam, lit. 'Vietnam Marine Police') is the coast guard and a uniformed people's armed force of Vietnam. Being a military maritime law enforcement agency, Vietnam Coast Guard is purposed to protect the Vietnamese state's interests and sovereignty rights at sea while also responsible for search and rescue duties, along with their duties of combating and preventing smuggling, piracy, and trade fraud in Vietnamese waters.

Until 2013, it was formally a branch of Vietnam's military, the Vietnam People's Army, and fell under the management of the Vietnam Ministry of National Defence. Since August 27, 2013, it has been transferred under the direct management of the Government of Vietnam, and has also changed its name from Vietnam Marine Police (VMP) to the current Vietnam Coast Guard name. Since its creation in the late 1990s, the Vietnam Coast Guard plays an important role in maintaining sea security and protection of the exclusive economic zone (EEZ) and continental shelf boundary. It has dispatched forces in waters in overlapping areas between Vietnam and foreign countries, providing protection and assistance to local fishermen when necessary.

== Leadership and principles of organization ==
According to the Vietnam Coast Guard Law (Vietnamese: Luật Cảnh sát biển) which "prescribes the status, functions, roles, powers, organization and operation of the Vietnam Coast Guard" and declaring the "responsibilities of involved entities and persons", the Vietnam Coast Guard shall be "...under the absolute and all-aspect leadership of the Communist Party of Vietnam, the supreme command of the President of Vietnam, the unified State management of the Government of Vietnam as well as the direct command and administration of the Vietnamese Defence Minister."

The Vietnam Coast Guard is under the direct administration from the Vietnam Ministry of National Defence.

== History ==
Previously, the Socialist Republic of Vietnam did not have a dedicated Coast Guard; the Navy had been used for offshore patrol and related military activity, along with the Border Guard, which had checkpoints in estuarine and littoral areas. These bodies were equipped with small boats for short pursuit and related equipment intended for short-term security applications. All river patrol responsibility belongs to the Fluvial Police (Cục Cảnh sát giao thông đường thủy - Bureau code:C25), supervised by provincial and/or local police office (Ministry of Public Security - Vietnam People's Public Security), and sometimes to the Vietnam Customs (Hải Quan), depending on the particular geographical responsibility (fluvial or fresh water only).

In order to relieve the burden on the Navy during peacetime and protect the sovereignty and sovereign rights of Vietnam in its maritime zones in compliance with international law, the Vietnam Coast Guard was then established under the name Vietnam Marine Police and placed under the Vietnam People’s Navy in 1998.

The Vietnam Coast Guard was first set up through President Tran Duc Luong's order No 3-L/CTN (7 April 1998), announcing the Ordinance on the Vietnam Marine Police, which had been accepted by The Tenth National Assembly of Vietnam on 28 March 1998.

The Vietnam Coast Guard (which was still known as the Vietnam Marine Police) became independent from the Vietnam People's Navy on 1 March 2008. It has in-scope intelligence based on international exchange and co-operation with its ASEAN counterparts in smuggling and on-sea drug interdiction operations. As an organization established to fight against illegal trafficking, it was keen to start with a fresh image, equipped with adequate technology and hardware, to deploy efficiently for its various specific missions. The current organizational pattern will serve as a role model for future extended projects.

== Goals ==
- Develop and maintain operational capability to ensure national maritime sovereignty.
- Be recognised by the nation as the guardian of maritime security.
- Become the foremost maritime security agency in South East Asia.
- Develop and improve the ability to respond to maritime search and rescue requirements throughout the area of responsibility.
- Develop and improve the ability to preserve and protect the maritime environment.
- Continually improve the organisation and operation of the agency.

== Mission ==
In its internal waters, territorial waters, contiguous zone, exclusive economic zone and continental shelf of Vietnam, the Vietnam Coast Guard has a mission to patrol and enforce laws in accordance with those of Vietnam and international treaties concerned. Vietnam is a contracting member on agreements (such as the United Nations Convention on the Law of the Sea (UNCLOS)) on defending sovereignty, jurisdiction, protection of natural resources, prevention of environmental pollution; detecting, preventing and combating acts of smuggling; piracy, trafficking, and transporting illegal narcotics. Besides, the Vietnam Coast Guard has a mission to patrol all the seas in the Southeast Asia region to protect freedom of navigation on the seas.

The Vietnam Coast Guard is responsible in co-operating with functional agencies to complete its mission. If any incident happens at sea, the Vietnam Coast Guard has the responsibility to inform to the functional agencies and co-ordinate with foreign countries to settle the issue. Lt. General Phạm Đức Lĩnh said in The 7th Heads of Asia Coast Guard Agencies Meeting (HACGAM - 7) in July 2011: "The Vietnam Coast Guard is used in overlapping sea areas between Vietnam and foreign countries. Local fishermen will be better protected and assisted if necessary, and we will remind local fishermen not to cross into the waters of foreign countries." In October 2013 the VCG were transferred from the navy to the coast guard, apparently so as to qualify for Japanese equipment aid.

The Vietnam Coast Guard is responsible for protecting the security of Vietnam's coast line and deals with problems like:

- Drug smuggling
- Human trafficking
- Counter-terrorism
- Industrial radioactive and toxic waste dumping
- Marine Environmental Protection
- Surveillance of Illegal Operations by Foreign Fishing Vessels
- Vietnam maritime law enforcement
- Marine assistance
- International Affairs
- Search and rescue (SAR)
- National defence - alongside the Vietnam People's Navy

In addition to its role, the Vietnam Coast Guard has moved their headquarters from Haiphong to Hanoi in February 2008, due to current needs to address these tasks. Current headquarters are located at 94 Le Loi Street, Nguyen Trai ward, Ha Dong district, Hanoi. Their training base and logistic support facilities remain in Haiphong.

== Establishment ==
=== Organizational system ===
1. Coast Guard Command

2. Units in Coast Guard Department:

- Regional Coast Guard: similar to Regional Navy. In the structure of Regional Navy have fleets, flotillas and Marine police teams;
- Coast Guard fleets;
- No.1 and No.2 Reconnaissance base;
- No.1,2,3, and 4 Anti-drugs, Anti-crime Task base;
- Center of Coast Guard Information;
- Center of Coast Guard Training.

=== Regional Coast Guard ===
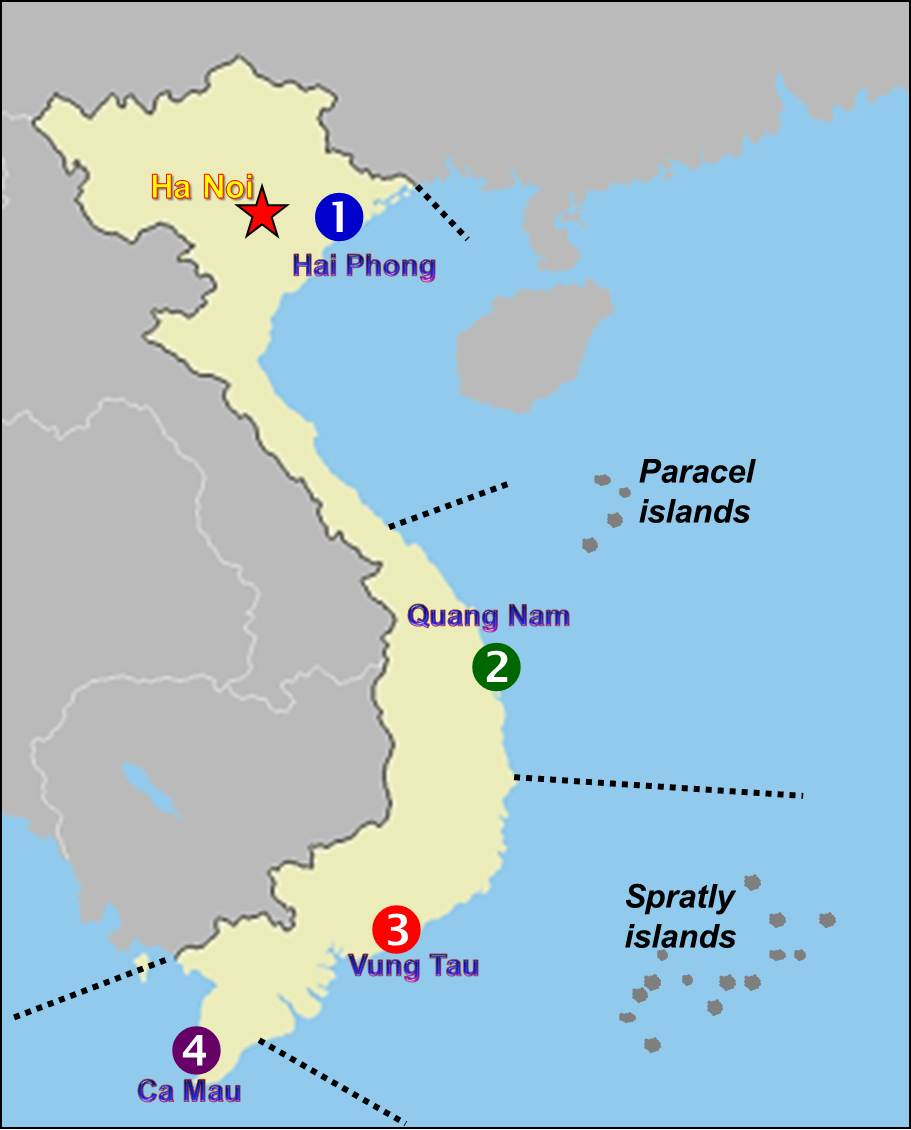
Vietnam Coast Guard regions

- 1st Regional Coast Guard: managed from Ka Long River, Quang Ninh Province to Con Co island, Quang Tri Province. Based in Hai Phong;
- 2nd Regional Coast Guard: managed from Con Co island, Quang Tri to Xanh islet, Binh Dinh Province and South China Sea. Based in Quang Nam Province;
- 3rd Regional Coast Guard: managed from Xanh islet, Binh Dinh to Dinh An harbour, Tra Vinh Province and South China Sea. Based in Ba Ria–Vung Tau Province;
- 4th Regional Coast Guard: managed from Dinh An harbour, Tra Vinh to Ha Tien, Kien Giang Province and the Gulf of Thailand. Based in Ca Mau.

== International co-operation ==
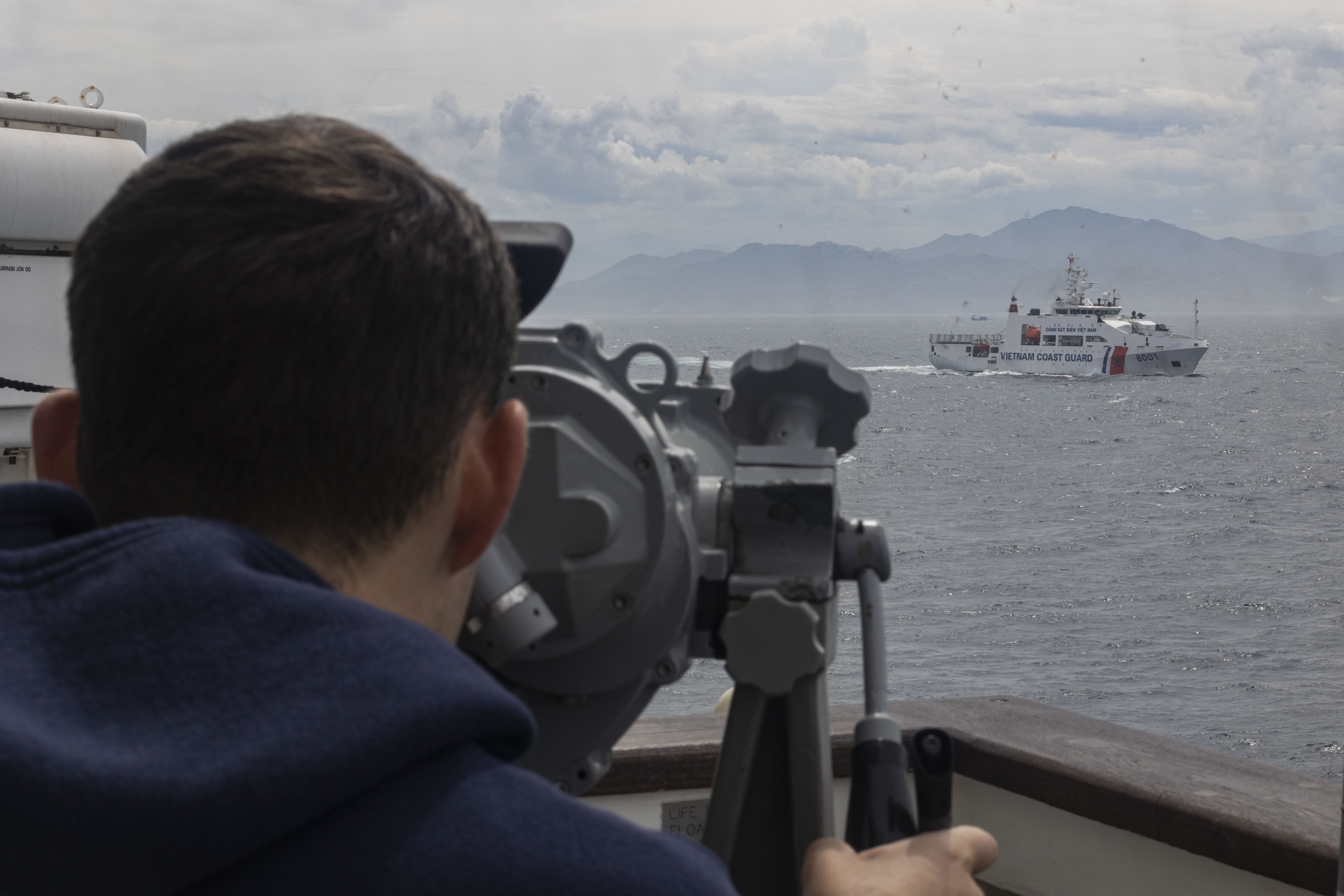
Vietnam Coast Guard's vessel CSB 8001 as seen during a joint exercise with USCGC Waesche in 2024.

The Vietnam Coast Guard and Philippine Coast Guard have signed an agreement to set up a hotline in principle. In the near future, both will draft detailed regulations on prompt co-ordination, if a situation at sea occurs.

The Vietnam Coast Guard has conducted joint patrols with the China Coast Guard.

On 14 July 2012, Japan's Minister for Foreign Affairs Kōichirō Genba and Vietnamese Deputy Prime Minister Pham Binh Minh had a meeting in Hanoi. The Japan Coast Guard is willing to help Vietnam bolster its coastal patrol capabilities, including setup of operations and training its personnel.

The Vietnam Coast Guard plans to be equipped with modern facilities to effectively carry out their tasks to maintain security, order, and safety in the territorial waters and exclusive economic zone with the close co-operation with regional coast guards of regional countries. To solve issues such as piracy, smuggling, trade fraud and transportation of persons, illegal drugs, disaster search and rescue, the Vietnam Coast Guard collaborates with several countries for networking exercises.

== Development ==
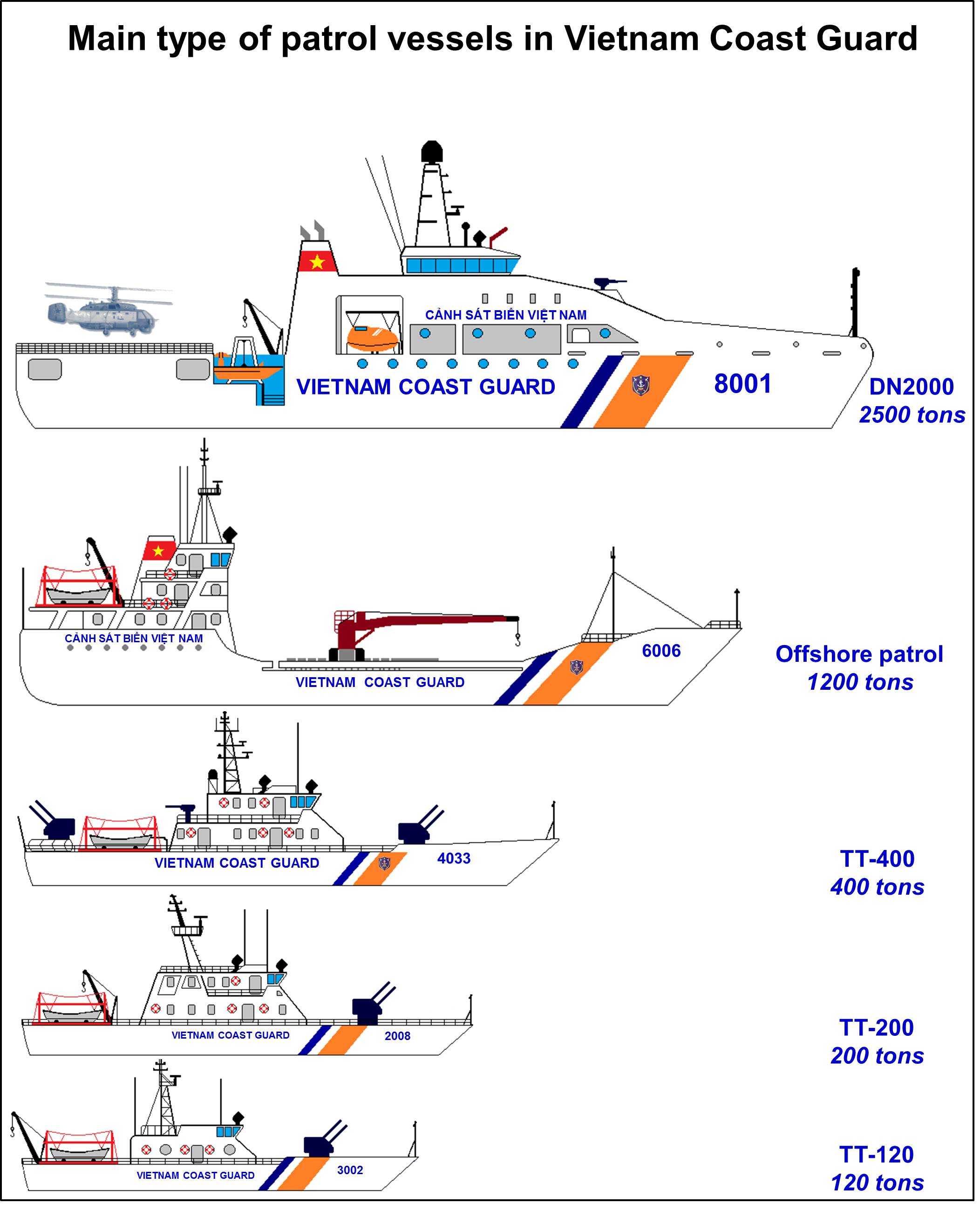
Main type of patrol vessels in Vietnam Coast Guard

The Vietnam Coast Guard has also cooperated with the Dutch Damen Group to build large vessels under Dutch license in Vietnam by companies including the Song Thu company and the 189 company. Vessels that have been completed include one offshore patrol vessel (9014), one hydrographic survey vessel (6613), and four salvage tugs.

In 2008, the Vietnam Coast Guard received three ocean sentry CASA C-212 Aviocar - Series 400 turboprop aircraft equipped with MSS 6000 systems from Airbus Military.

The Vietnamese government has planned to invest in upgrading facilities for the force, including modern ships which can operate in bad weather and stay for longer periods at sea. Furthermore, the force is also equipped with helicopters to enhance its operations at the border of the continental shelf and exclusive economic zone of Vietnam to protect its territorial waters and Vietnamese fishermen. This is especially important with the ongoing disputes over sovereignty in and around Vietnamese waters.

== Equipment ==
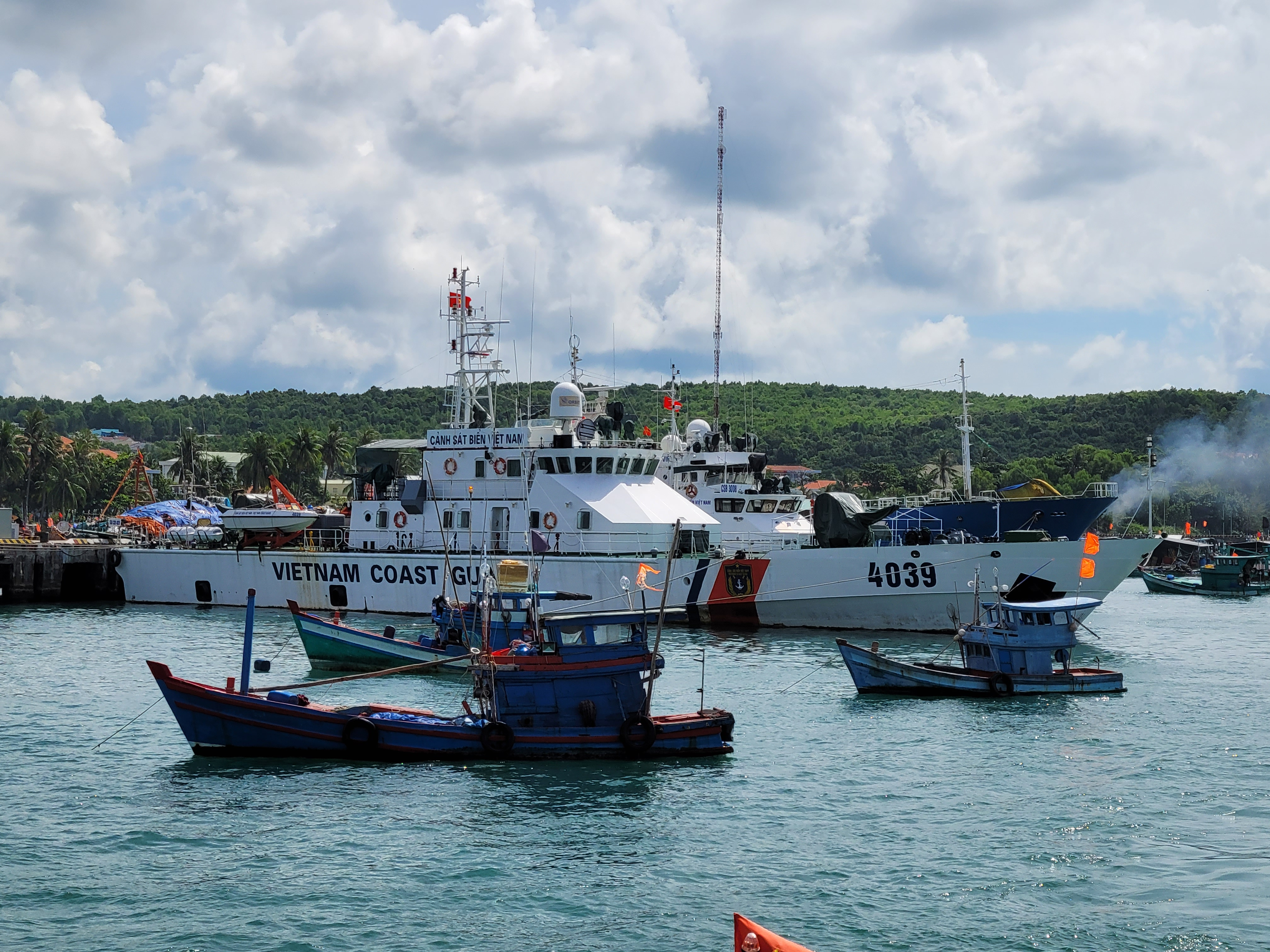
A TT-400 type patrol boat, numbered CSB 4039, stationing at An Thới, Phú Quốc alongside local fishing boats.

The Vietnam Coast Guard's vessels are equipped with specialised functions. A majority of VCG-commissioned ships are locally-built:

- To engage in coastal patrol and protection, using vessels from 120 to 400 tons, numbered beginning with 00, 10, 20, 30, and so on;
- To support search and rescue, using vessels from 1000 to 2000 tons, numbered beginning with 600 numbers;
- To conduct offshore patrols, using vessels over 2500 tons with helicopters on deck, numbered beginning with 800 numbers;
- To conduct search and rescue operations, using vessels designated with SAR or 900 numbers.

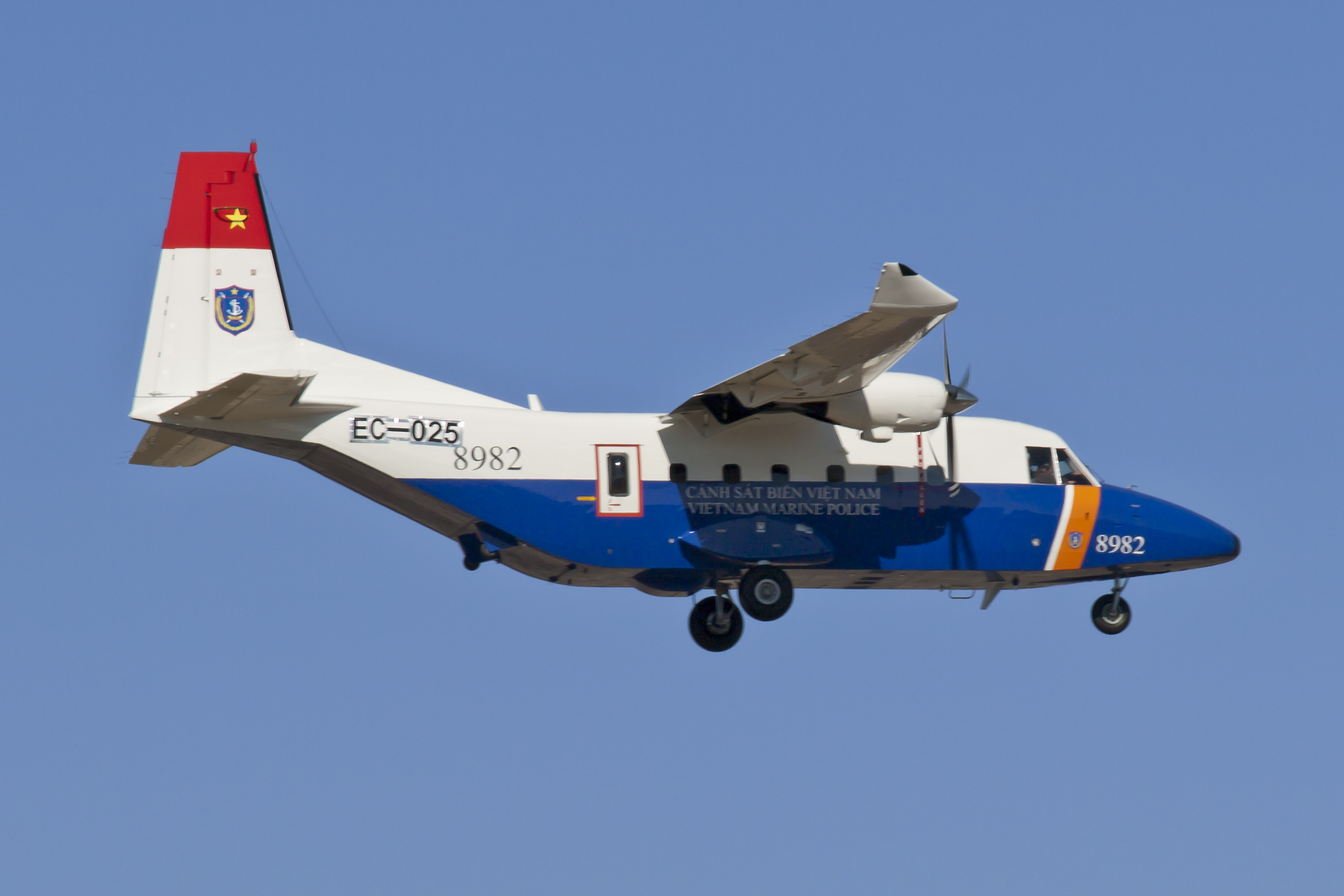
CASA C-212 series 400 of Vietnam Coast Guard

Vietnam Coast Guard's vessels are named (or numbered, since VCG does not adopt literal naming) with the prefix CSB (abbreviated from the Vietnamese name Cảnh sát biển lit. 'Coast Guard' or 'Marine Police') followed by a three or four-digit hull number. All vessels are designed with the orange-colored racing stripes which is similar to the US Coast Guard's Service Mark. Except a minor number of search and rescue ships which are painted in orange and a few reconnaissance/intelligence ships painted in blue and lacking the service marking, the remaining part of VCG fleet is categorized as white hulls and painted in the respective color. Since the formation of the force until 2015, VCG had used a blue hull color which is comparable to the Russian Coast Guard, however, from early 2015, white has been designated as the standard hull color for VCG to satisfy the international conventions.

=== Patrol Vessel ===
Photo	Model	Type	Ship	Quantity	Origin	Note
	Hamilton-class cutter	Patrol boat	CSB 8020 CSB 8021 CSB 8022	3	United States	CSB 8020 is formerly USCGC Morgenthau (WHEC-722). CSB 8021 is formerly USCGC John Midgett (WHEC-726). CSB 8022 is formerly USCGC Mellon (WHEC-717). Maximum 3,250 tons.
	DN 2000 (Damen OPV 9014)	Patrol boat	CSB 8001 CSB 8002 CSB 8004 CSB 8005	4	NetherlandsVietnam	Design is based on Damen 9014 OPV with modifications. Overhauled at Song Thu Shipyard between deployments. Maximum 2,500 tons.
	Han-river class	Patrol boat	CSB 8003	1	South Korea	Maximum 1,500 tons.
	TT-1500	Patrol boat		(+4)	India Vietnam	Four ships on order. Maximum 1,500 tons.
	TT-1000	Patrol boat		(+6)	Japan	Six ships on order using ODA aid from JICA. Maximum 1,000 tons
	Spratly-class	Patrol boat / Transport	CSB 6006 CSB 6007	2	Vietnam	Maximum 1,200 tons.
	Teshio class (Natsui class)	Patrol boat / Transport	CSB 6001 CSB 6002 CSB 6003 CSB 6004 CSB 6005	5	Japan	Maximum 600 tons.
	TT-400	Patrol boat	CSB 4031, CSB 4032, CSB 4033, CSB 4034, CSB 4035, CSB 4036, CSB 4037, CSB 4038, CSB 4039, CSB 4040, CSB 4041, CSB 4042, CSB 4043	13 (+3)	Vietnam	Maximum 400 tons.
	TS-500CV	Patrol boat / Intelligence / SAR ship	CSB 6008 CSB 6009 CSB 6011	3	Vietnam	Maximum 398 tons.
	Patrol boat	Patrol boat	CSB 2015 CSB 2016	2	South Korea	Maximum 280 tons.
	TT-200	Patrol boat	CSB 2001, CSB 2002, CSB 2003, CSB 2004, CSB 2005, CSB 2006, CSB 2007, CSB 2008, CSB 2009, CSB 2010, CSB 2011, CSB 2012, CSB 2013, CSB 2014	14	Vietnam	Maximum 200 tons.
	Shershen-class	Patrol boat	CSB 5011 CSB 5012 CSB 5013 CSB 5014	4	Soviet Union	Maximum 148 tons.
	TT-120	Patrol boat	CSB 1001, CSB 1011, CSB 1012, CSB 1013, CSB 1014, CSB 3001, CSB 3002, CSB 3003, CSB 3004, CSB 3005, CSB 3006, CSB 3007, CSB 3008, CSB 3009	14	Vietnam	Maximum 120 tons.
	High-Speed Patrol boat MS50S	Patrol boat	CSB 426, CSB 427, CSB 603, CSB 604, CSB 605, CSB 606, CSB 607, CSB 608, CSB 609, CSB 610, CSB 611, CSB 612, CSB 613, CSB 614, CSB 615, CSB 616, CSB 617, CSB 618, CSB 619, CSB 620, CSB 621, CSB 622, CSB 623, CSB 624, CSB 625, CSB 626	26	Vietnam	
	Metal Shark 45 Defiant	Patrol boat	CSB 701, CSB 702, CSB 703, CSB 704, CSB 705, CSB 706, CSB 707, CSB 708, CSB 709, CSB 710, CSB 711, CSB 712, CSB 713, CSB 714, CSB 715, CSB 716, CSB 717, CSB 718	24	United States	

=== Utility Ship ===
Photo	Model	Type	Ship	Quantity	Builder	Note
	H-222	Replenishment / Transport / Patrol / SAR	CSB 7011	1	Vietnam	Maximum 4,000 tons.
	Damen Salvage tug 4612	Search & rescue	CSB 9001 CSB 9002 CSB 9003 CSB 9004 CSB 9005	5	Netherlands Vietnam	Maximum 1,400 tons.
	Damen STU-1606	Tugboat	CSB 9031 CSB 9032 CSB 9033 CSB 9034	4	Netherlands Vietnam	Maximum 90 tons

=== Aircraft ===
Photo	Model	Type	Variant	Quantity	Builder	Notes
	CASA C-212 Aviocar	Patrol / SAR	Series 400	2	Spain	Total of three aircraft. One was lost during searching of a missing Su-30 fighter. Operated by Air Force Brigade 918. VCG-8981, VCG-8982

== Table of Ranks ==
=== Commissioned officer ranks ===
The rank insignia of commissioned officers.

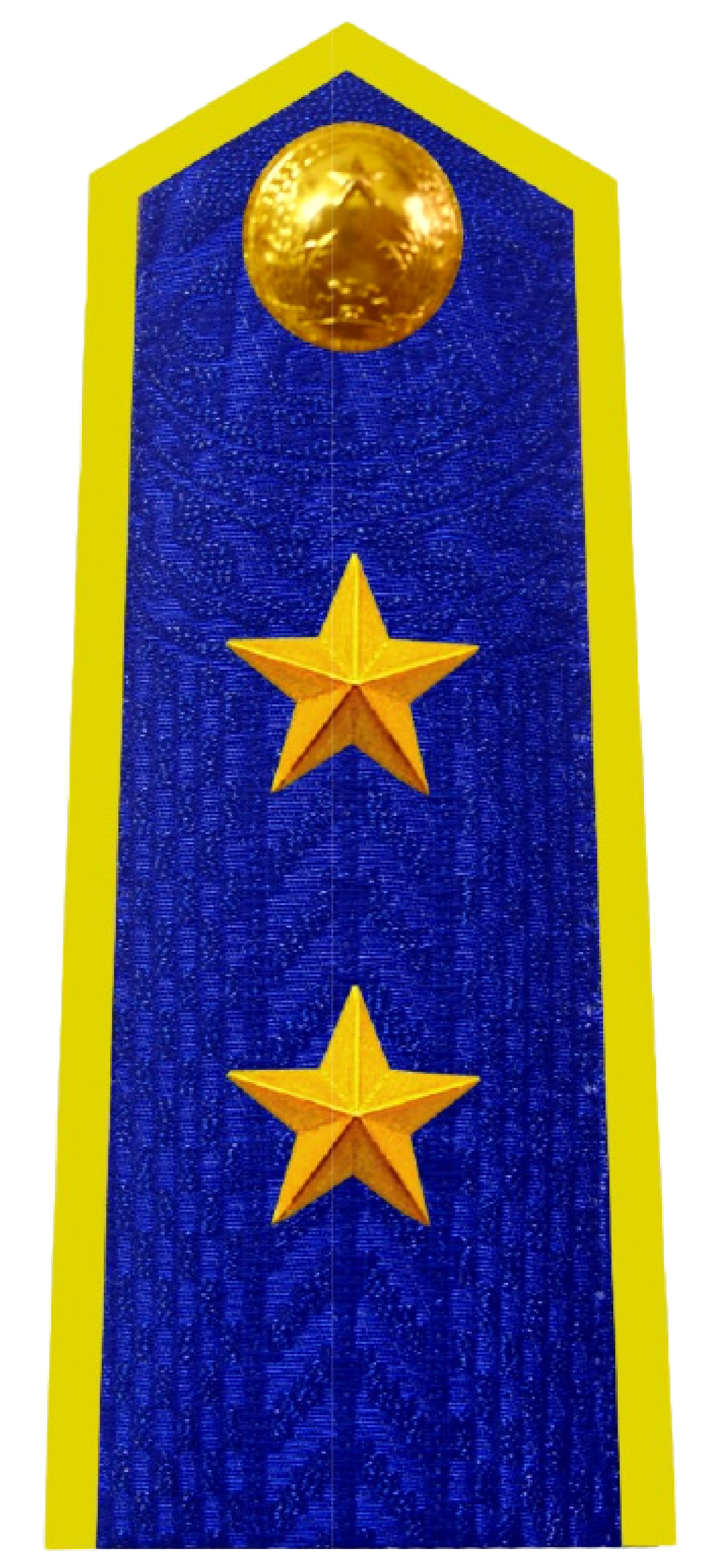
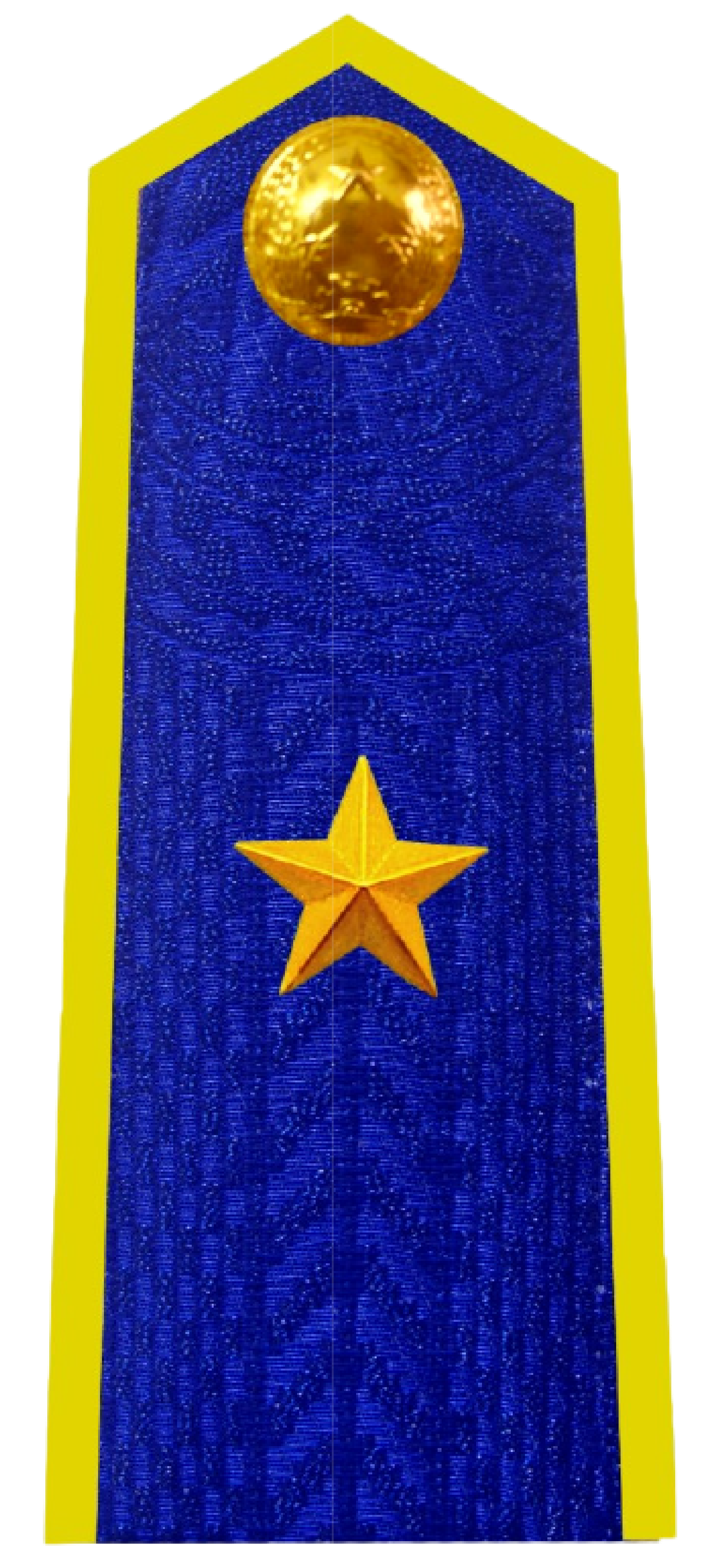
Rank group	General / flag officers		Senior officers				Junior officers
Vietnam Coast Guard
Vietnam Coast Guard	Trung tướng	Thiếu tướng	Đại tá	Thượng tá	Trung tá	Thiếu tá	Đại úy	Thượng úy	Trung úy	Thiếu úy

=== Other ranks ===
The rank insignia of non-commissioned officers and enlisted personnel.

Rank group	Senior NCOs		Junior NCOs	Enlisted
Vietnam Coast Guard
Vietnam Coast Guard	Thượng sĩ	Trung sĩ	Hạ sĩ	Binh nhất	Binh nhì

== See also ==
- Vietnam People's Ground Forces
- Vietnam People's Navy
- Vietnam People's Air Force
- People's Army of Vietnam Special Forces
- Naval Air Force, Vietnam People's Navy
- Vietnam People's Public Security
- Vietnam Fisheries Surveillance
