= Vietnam People's Navy =

- Hải quân nhân dân Việt Nam
- Badge
- Founded: 7 May 1955
- Country: Socialist Republic of Vietnam (since 1976) North Vietnam (1955-1976)
- Allegiance: Communist Party of Vietnam
- Type: Naval force
- Role: Naval warfare and amphibious warfare
- Size: 50,000 officers, sailors, and naval infantrymen 131 ships (including auxiliaries)
- Part of: People's Army of Vietnam
- Headquarters: VPN Command HQ, 27 Điện Biên Phủ, Minh Khai, Hồng Bàng District, Haiphong
- Nicknames: Naval Service; Vietnam(ese) Navy
- Mottos: Đảo là nhà, Biển cả là quê hương (Our Home are the Islands, Our Homeland is the Sea)
- Colour: Purple, White
- March: Lướt sóng ra khơi (Surfing to the sea)
- Anniversaries: 7 May 1955
- Fleet: 9 submarines; 9 frigates; 17 corvettes; 42 patrol vessels 24 amphibious warfare ships; 8 minesweepers; 1 training vessel; 21 Auxiliaries
- Engagements: Vietnam War; Cambodian–Vietnamese War; Johnson South Reef Skirmish; MT Zafirah hijacking
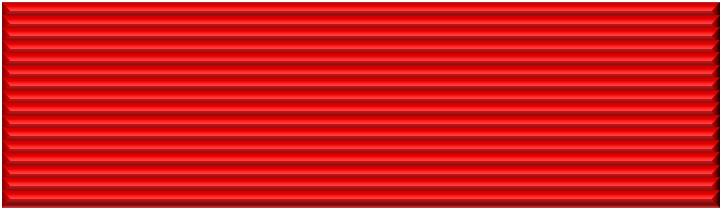
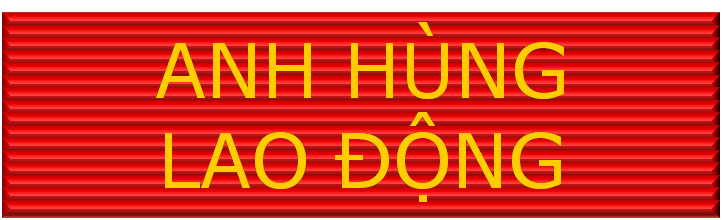
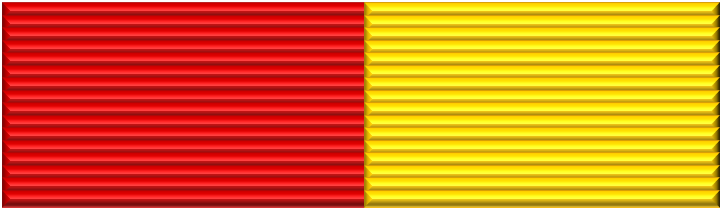
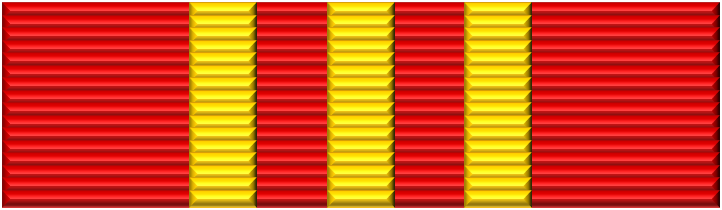
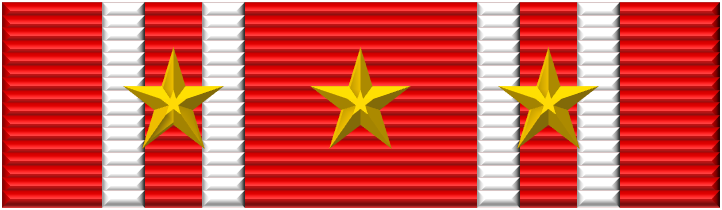
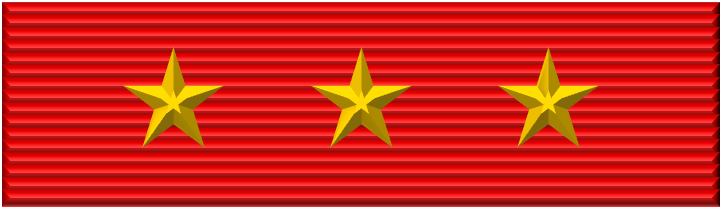
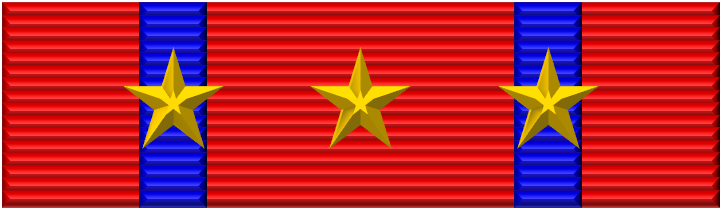
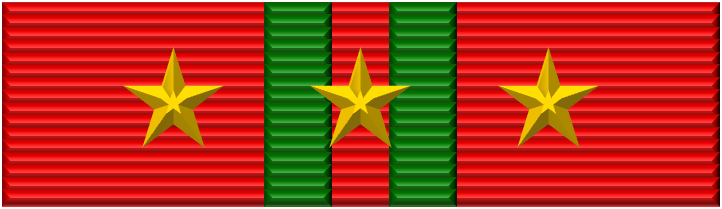
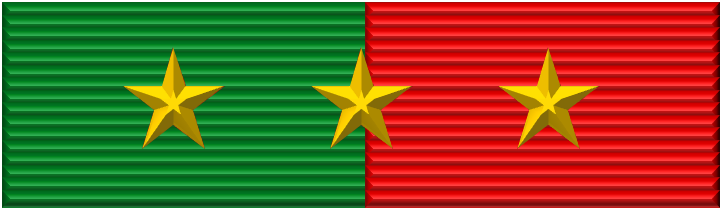
- Decorations: Hero of the People's Armed Forces; Hero of Labor (Vietnam); Gold Star Order (Vietnam); Ho Chi Minh Order; Order of Independence; Military Exploit Order; Labor Order; Feat Order; Fatherland Defense Order

Commanders
- Commander of the Navy: Vice admiral Trần Thanh Nghiêm
- Political Commissar: Vice admiral Nguyễn An Phong
- Chief of Staff: Rear admiral Nguyễn Văn Bách

Insignia
- Flag of the Service

- Naval ensign

- Front badge

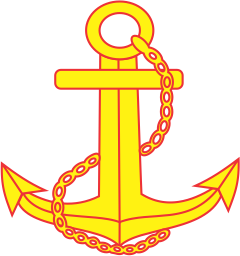
- Symbol

- Emblem (former)

- Roundel (former)

Aircraft flown
- Helicopter: Kamov Ka-28 Helix-A
- Utility helicopter: Eurocopter EC225 Super Puma, Kamov Ka-32T Helix-C
- Patrol: Viking Air DHC-6 Series 400

The Vietnam People's Navy (VPN; Vietnamese: Hải quân nhân dân Việt Nam), internally the Naval Service (Vietnamese: Quân chủng Hải quân (QCHQ)), also known as the Vietnamese People's Navy or the Vietnamese Navy (Vietnamese: Hải quân Việt Nam), is the naval branch of the Vietnam People's Army and is responsible for the protection of the country's national waters, islands, and interests of the maritime economy, as well as for the co-ordination of maritime police, customs service and the border defence force.

The VPN also maintains a naval infantry arm, the Vietnam People's Navy Naval Infantry, which, according to the International Institute of Strategic Studies, in 2025 constituted the majority of the VPN, with 27,000 naval infantrymen.

== History ==
=== Vietnam War ===
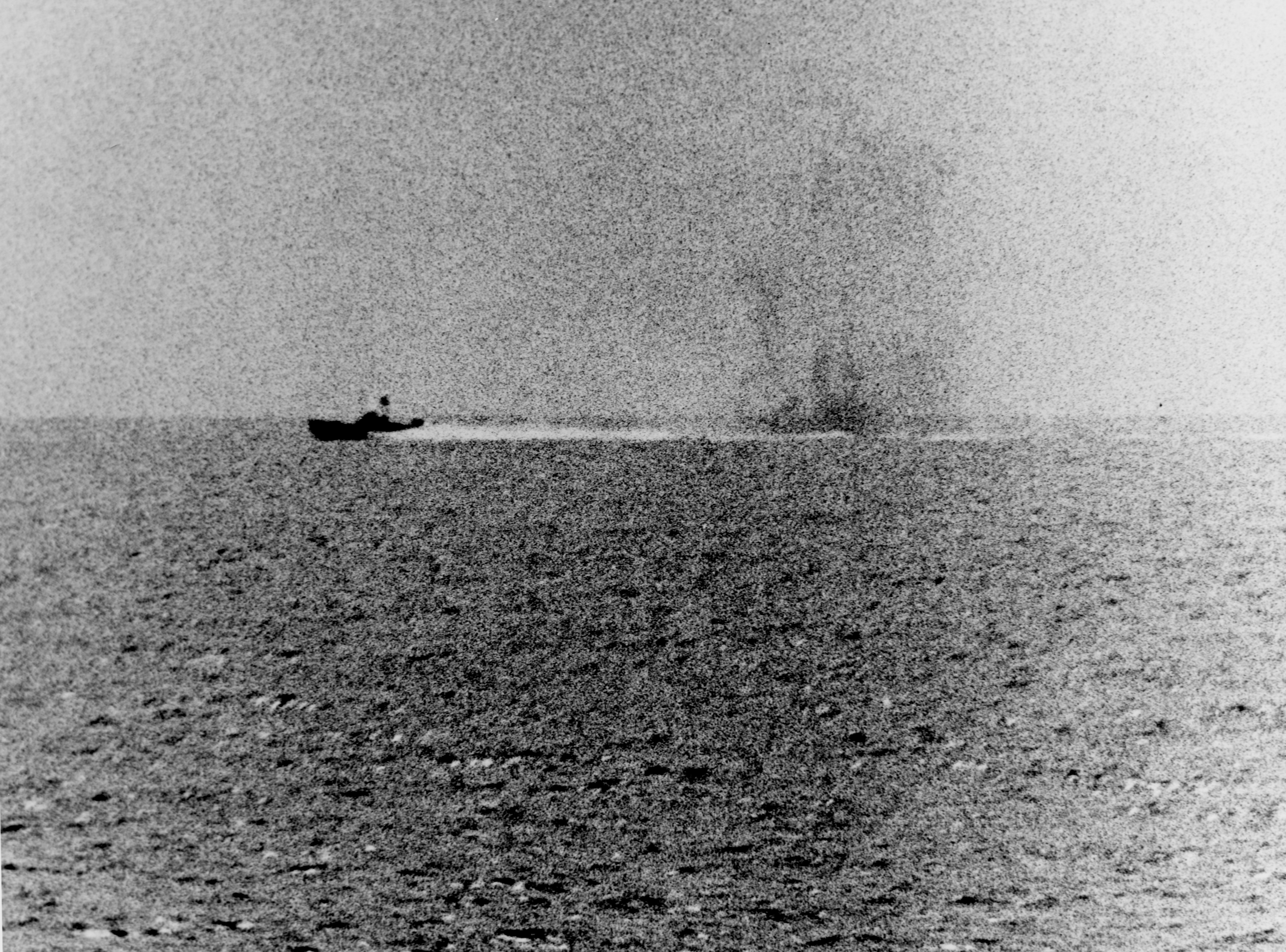
A North Vietnamese P-4 engaging USS Maddox (DD-731) in Gulf of Tonkin incident 1964

On 19 July 1946, Acting President of Democratic Republic of Vietnam (DRV) Huỳnh Thúc Kháng signed into law a decree establishing the modern Vietnamese navy. Then, on 10 September of that year, General Võ Nguyên Giáp started to build a flotilla as the core of the new navy. On 8 March 1949, Vietnam established the Department of Naval Research under the General Staff. This department has performed both research and training to prepare for combat missions.

Following the Geneva Conference in 1954, the DRV went about creating its own naval forces. On 7 May 1955 the Vietnam People's Navy was created with the establishment of the General Directorate of Coastal Defence, it formed the basis for the Navy Operational Command (based on the Vietnamese Ministry of Defence decree No. 284/ND signed by General Võ Nguyên Giáp to established Naval Research Board, under the General Staff, on 8 March 1949). The primary mission of the Navy was to patrol the coastal areas and the inland waterways.

Throughout the Vietnam War the role played by the Vietnam People's Navy (or North Vietnamese Navy) was largely unknown to the public. However, on 2 August 1964, three North Vietnamese Shantou-class gunboats attacked the destroyer USS Maddox in what became known as the Gulf of Tonkin Incident. The second attack, which the United States claimed to have occurred on 4 August, was dismissed by the North Vietnamese as a fabrication.

The North Vietnamese, however, had maintained their own version of the events which took place. According to official VPN accounts Maddox penetrated North Vietnamese waters on 31 July 1964, and provoked a battle with the North Vietnamese. In response to American provocation, three 123K-class torpedo boats from the 135th Torpedo Boat Battalion were dispatched to intercept the American destroyer. The resulting clash became known as the 'Battle of Thanh Hóa' in which North Vietnamese "torpedo boats succeeded in driving the Maddox out of Vietnam's territorial waters, shooting down a U.S. aircraft and damaging another".

Apart from patrolling territorial waters, the Navy also had the mission of transporting military supplies to support the People's Army of Vietnam (PAVN) and the Viet Cong during the Vietnam War. On 31 October 1961, a sea route version of the Ho Chi Minh trail was established by the Navy, with the 759th Transport Unit responsible for carrying military supplies and other goods for the Communist ground forces in South Vietnam. To avoid detection by the South Vietnamese and U.S. navies, North Vietnamese transport ships were often disguised as fishing trawlers. On 16 February 1965, a 100-ton North Vietnamese trawler from the Transportation Group 125 was discovered at Vung Ro Bay. This led to the creation of Operation Market Time by the US Navy to intercept disguised enemy ships.

On 19 April 1972, the Navy and Vietnam People's Air Force (VPAF) participated in the Battle of Đồng Hới off the coast of North Vietnam. The U.S. Navy claimed to have destroyed a Soviet-made cruise missile for the first time. The destroyer USS Higbee was damaged after a VPAF MiG-17 dropped a 250 lb (110 kg) bomb, destroying a 5-inch (127 mm) aft gun mount.

In the years following the complete withdrawal of U.S. and other allied forces, the North Vietnamese went back on the offensive. As part of the Ho Chi Minh Campaign, the Navy increased the transportation of military supplies, food and uniform to the Communist forces in the South. When the PAVN occupied the northern provinces of South Vietnam in 1975, captured Republic of Vietnam Navy (RVNN) vessels were pressed into service with the Navy. In April 1975, ex-RVNN vessels carried North Vietnamese troops to capture the Spratly Islands. Opening battle in the island Southwest Cay (Vietnamese: Song Tử tây) on 4 April 1975, amphibious raid by sea of the Naval Marine corps number 1 (precursor of the 126th Brigade Naval Marine corps) and three vessels of the 125 corps coordinated with the commandos of the 5th Military Region, after 30 minutes, the Navy controlled the main battle area, facilitating the capture of the other islands. The Navy gained control of Sand Cay island (26 April), Namyit Island (27 April), Sin Cowe Island (28 April) and Spratly Island (29 April). The Chinese People's Liberation Army Navy (PLAN) had captured the Paracel Islands from the South Vietnamese in January 1974. These islands are also claimed by Vietnam, however they have no current presence there.

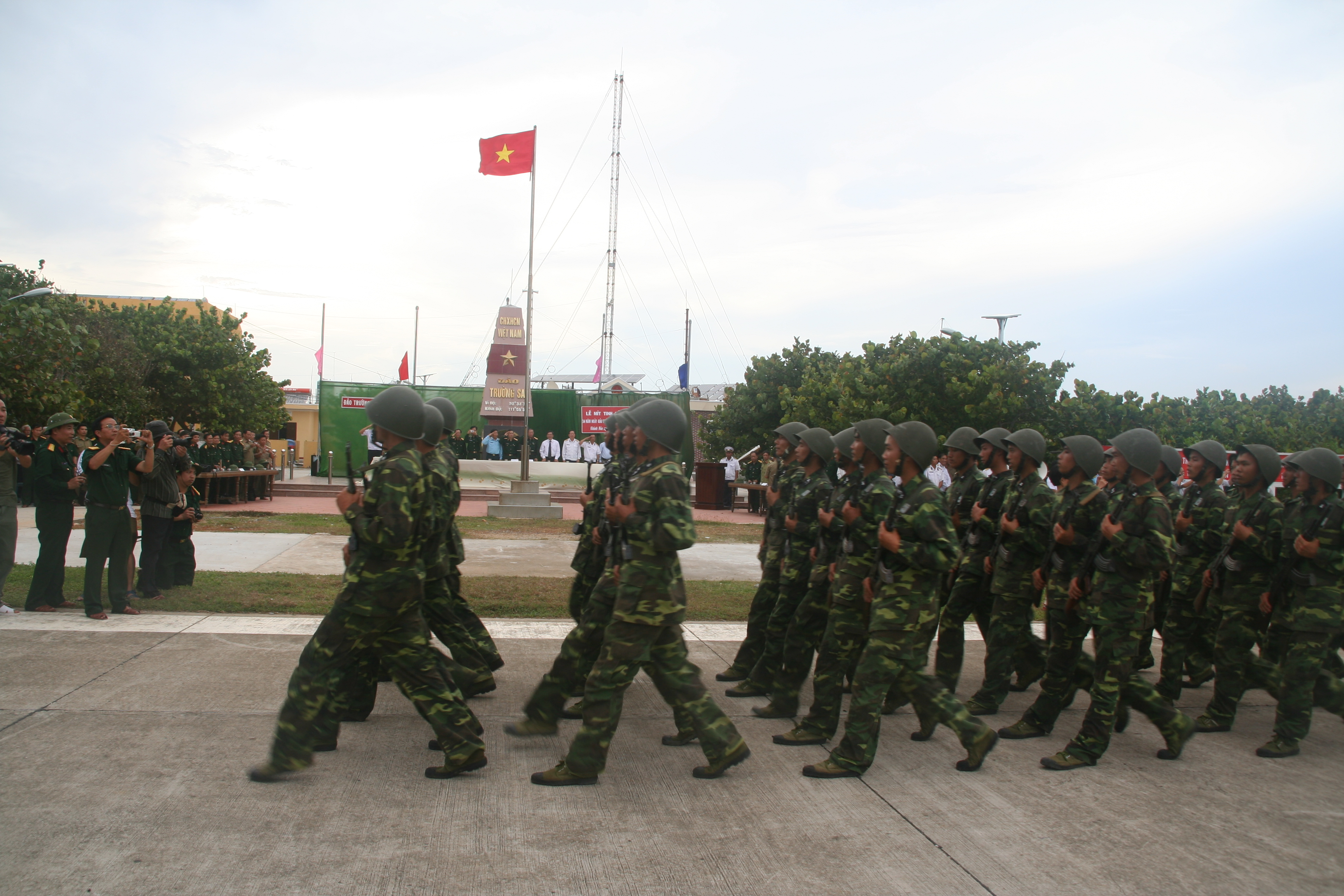
Vietnam Naval Infantry in Spratly Islands

Prior to 1975, the Navy operated fewer than forty patrol boats along with the coastal junk force. With the collapse of South Vietnam on 30 April 1975, the Navy was expanded with ships from the defunct RVNN. Captured vessels included two patrol frigates, over one hundred patrol craft, and about fifty amphibious warfare ships. Consequently, the navy ballooned in size to become the largest Southeast Asian navy by the mid-1980s, with 1,300 out of its 1,500 vessels captured from the South Vietnamese Navy or US Navy.

In the late 1970s a naval infantry (or marine) force was formed for service on the areas claimed by the Socialist Republic of Vietnam in the Spratly Islands. They are equipped with PT-76 light tanks, BTR-60 personnel carriers. Naval infantrymen are armed with the AK-74 rifle, AKM-47 assault rifle, Makarov PM pistol (Officers), and PKM machinegun infantry weapons, among other equipment.

In March 1988, the Navy was attacked by the PLAN at Johnson Reef, resulting in loss several Vietnamese transport ships and up to 64 deaths. The PLAN outgunned and outnumbered the Vietnamese, using a fleet of frigates against lightly armed transport ships. This prompted the Navy to modernise its weapons and its overall naval capabilities.

=== Modernization ===
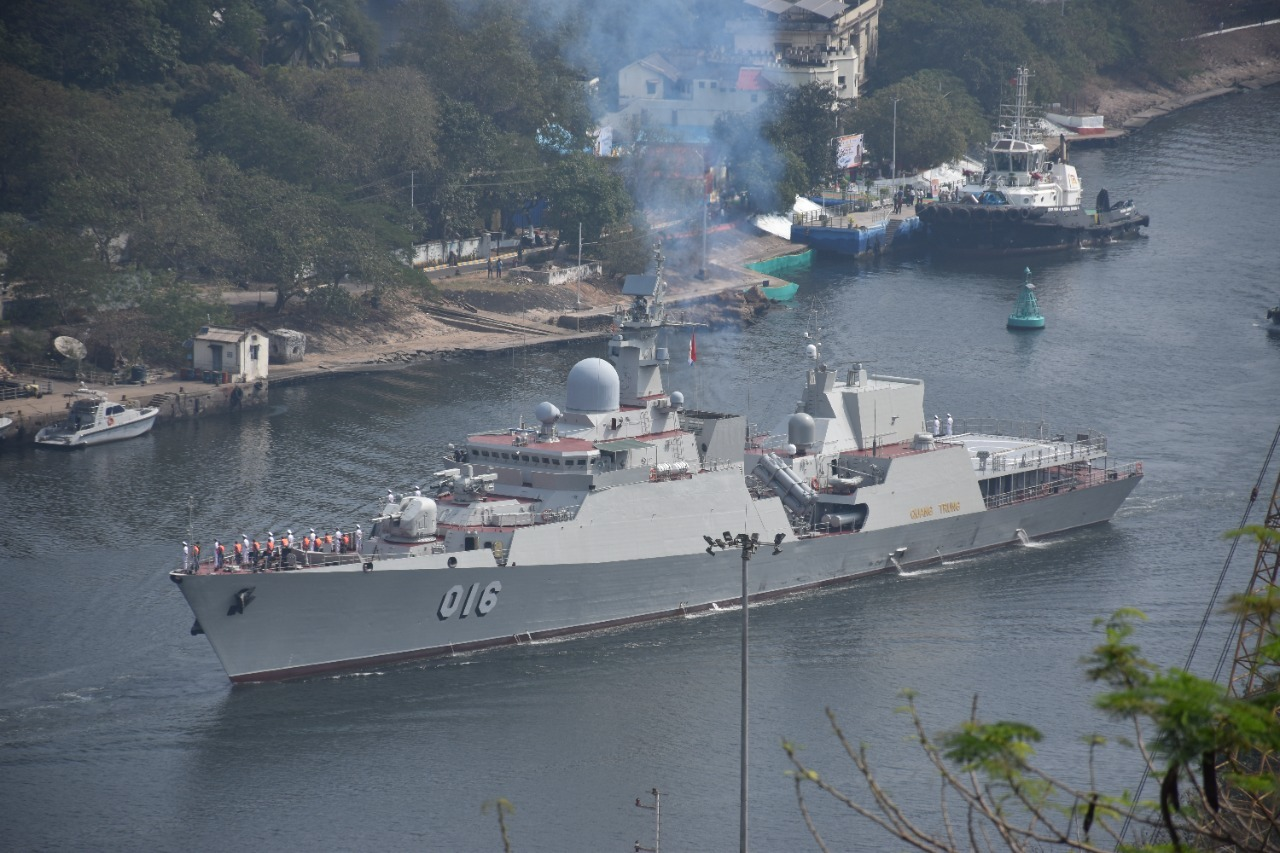
Ship 016 Quang Trung

The VPN began modernizing with its contract purchasing two Gepard-class frigates from Russia in 2006. From that point until 2016, a series of changes were implemented to transform the VPN from a purely brown-water navy to one capable of safeguarding its territorial interests in the South China Sea. Its most modern ships in 2011 were its 5 Petya-class frigates (2 Petya-III's from the late 70s, and 3 Petya-III's from the 80s) and a KBO-2000 fast attack craft. The navy attempted a KBO-2000 project with Russia in which the Severnoye Design Bureau designed a KBO-2000 which was constructed in Ba Son Shipyard in Ho Chi Minh City. Only one ship of this class was built by Vietnam, designated HQ-381, but it did not meet the Navy's expectations and had problems with the pump-jet engine so the project was canceled.

== Organisational structure ==
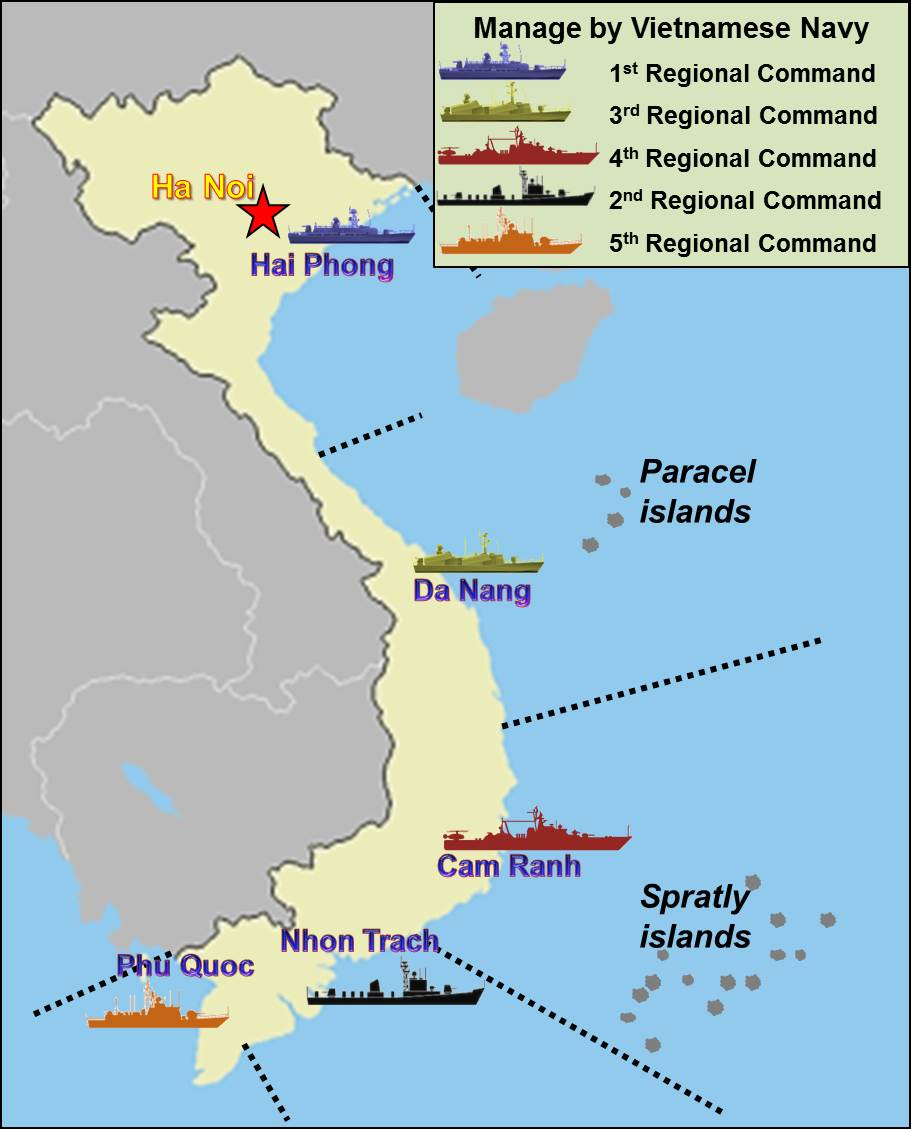
VPN's Naval regions

Organisational levels of Vietnam People's Navy, from highest to lowest are:

- Naval Headquarters (Bộ tư lệnh Hải quân) takes command of the entire Navy
- Naval Regions (Vùng Hải quân) 1st, 2nd, 3rd, 4th, 5th
- Naval Brigade (Lữ đoàn Hải quân)
- Naval Regiment (Trung đoàn Hải quân)
- Naval Battalion (Hải đoàn)
- Squadron (Hải đội)

=== Naval Regions ===
On 26 October 1975, the Ministry of Defence issued Decision No.141/QD-QP which established five Coastal Areas of Naval Command and jurisdiction provisions of the five regions. In 1978, they were renamed as the following naval regions:

- 1st Regional Command (A Regional Command): Gulf of Tonkin, north coast from Quảng Ninh to Hà Tĩnh and the islands in Gulf of Tonkin. Command Headquarters: Haiphong.
  - Commander: Rear Admiral Phạm Văn Điển.
  - Political Commissar: Rear Admiral Phạm Văn Vững.
- 2nd Regional Command (B Regional Command): South China Sea and south coast from Bình Thuận to Bạc Liêu, southern continental shelf, including the key areas are economic science service areas (called are DK1, DK2). Command Headquarters: Nhơn Trạch, Đồng Nai.
  - Commander: Rear Admiral Phạm Khắc Lượng.
  - Political Commissar: Rear Admiral Nguyễn Phong Cảnh.
- 3rd Regional Command (C Regional Command): North central coast, from Quảng Bình to Bình Định, including the islands of Cồn Cỏ, Lý Sơn,... and Paracel Islands. Command Headquarters: Da Nang.
  - Commander: Rear Admiral Đỗ Quốc Việt
  - Political Commissar: Rear Admiral Nguyễn Tiến Dũng
- 4th Regional Command (D Regional Command): South China Sea, south central coast including Spratly Islands, Phú Quý island and the south central coast, from Phú Yên to Bình Thuận. Command Headquarters: Cam Ranh Bay military port, Khánh Hòa province.
  - Commander: Rear Admiral Phạm Văn Hoành.
  - Political Commissar: Rear Admiral Phạm Thanh Hóa.
- 5th Regional Command (E Regional Command): South China Sea and coast in Gulf of Thailand from Cà Mau to Kiên Giang. Command Headquarters: Phú Quốc, Kiên Giang.
  - Commander: Rear Admiral Nguyễn Duy Tỷ.
  - Political Commissar: Rear Admiral Ngô Văn Phát.
- Naval Infantry
- 602nd Signals Brigade (GAZ-3308 SATCOM)

=== Armed services ===
Surface Ships	Naval Commando	Naval Infantry	Naval Air Force	Missile – Coastal Artillery	Submarine Force

=== Ranks in Vietnam People's Navy ===
==== Commissioned officer ranks ====
The following are the rank insignia of commissioned officers. Beginning in the 2010s, Navy officers were given gold sleeve and cuff insignia following the practice of most international navies, which are worn on the cuff in the full dress with the executive curl.

Rank group	General / flag officers			Senior officers				Junior officers
Vietnam People's Navy
Vietnam People's Navy	Đô đốc	Phó đô đốc	Chuẩn đô đốc	Đại tá	Thượng tá	Trung tá	Thiếu tá	Đại úy	Thượng úy	Trung úy	Thiếu úy

==== Other ranks ====
The rank insignia of non-commissioned officers and enlisted personnel.

Rank group	Senior NCOs		Junior NCOs	Enlisted
Vietnam People's Navy
Vietnam People's Navy	Thượng sĩ	Trung sĩ	Hạ sĩ	Binh nhất	Binh nhì

=== Naval Academy ===
The Vietnamese naval academy, with its headquarters in Nha Trang, is the main institute for training naval commanding officers for the divisional level, and commanding staffs at tactical/campaign levels. Students include both undergraduates and postgraduates serving in the military.

The forerunner of the Vietnam Naval Academy, the Coastal Training School, was established on 26 April 1955 by the General Staff. The school has changed name several times, such as the Naval Training School in 1959, the Naval School of Vietnam in 1961, the Naval Officers School in 1967, and the School of Naval Engineering Command in 1980. The school renamed itself the Naval Academy in 1993.

After 55 years of development, combat and growth, the academy has trained thousands of officers and technical staff for major specialised fields such as vessel control, mining and anti-mine operations, anti-submarine missiles, gunships, information, radar, sonar, coastal radar, shipyard work, the Coast Guard, and Border Defence Force.

In addition, the naval academy has trained officers for both the Royal Cambodian Navy and the Lao People's Navy.

=== Manpower ===
The current total manpower of the navy is around 50,000 officers and enlisted personnel, including naval infantry and other specialised units.

== See also ==
- Vietnam Coast Guard
- Republic of Vietnam Navy
- Gulf of Tonkin incident
- Vũng Rô Bay Incident

== Sources ==
- Cooke, Nola; Li, Tana; Anderson, James, eds. (2011). The Tongking Gulf Through History (illustrated ed.). University of Pennsylvania Press. ISBN 978-0812243369.
- Lary, Diana (2007). Diana Lary (ed.). The Chinese State at the Borders (illustrated ed.). UBC Press. ISBN 978-0774813334.
- Supriyanto, Ristian Atriandi, ed. (2017). Naval Modernisation in Southeast Asia: Problems and Prospects for Small and Medium Navies. Springer. ISBN 9783319584065.
- Tsai, Shih-Shan Henry (1996). The Eunuchs in the Ming Dynasty (Ming Tai Huan Kuan) (illustrated ed.). SUNY Press. ISBN 0791426874.
- Wade, Geoff (2005). Southeast Asia in the Ming Shi-lu: an open access resource. Asia Research Institute and the Singapore E-Press, National University of Singapore.
