= People's Army of Vietnam Special Forces =

Special Operation Force Arms
- Binh chủng Đặc công
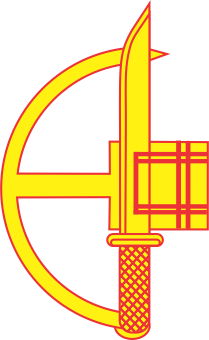
- Symbol
- Founded: March 19, 1967; 59 years ago
- Country: Vietnam
- Allegiance: Communist Party of Vietnam
- Type: Special operations force
- Role: Direct action
- Mottos: Đặc biệt tinh nhuệ, Anh dũng tuyệt vời, Mưu trí táo bạo, Đánh hiểm thắng lớn (Uniquely elite; Superbly heroic; Ingenious and daring; Deadly attacks for great victories)
- Decorations: Hero of the People's Armed Forces; Order of Ho Chi Minh; Gold Star Order

Commanders
- Notable commanders: Colonel Nguyễn Chí Điềm

The Special Operation Force Arms (SOFA; Vietnamese: Binh chủng Đặc công) is the elite forces of the People's Army of Vietnam (VPA). Personnels are specially organized, equipped, and trained. The force specializes in employing unexpected tactics deep behind the enemy's line. It also served as the VPA's rapid response force, maintaining readiness for special operations and counterterrorism.

== History ==
=== First Indochina War ===
The Viet Minh (VM) used commandos during the First Indochina War. Commando units stationed in strategic areas and operated on land, rivers and at sea. Operations included coordinated attacks on 50 French watchtowers in Biên Hòa on March 21 and March 23, 1950; and attacks on Phú Thọ, the Tân An bomb depot, Cát Bi airport and Gia Lam Airport towards the end of the war.

=== Vietnam War ===
After the 1954 Geneva Conference, VPA commandos began infiltrating into and attacking targets in South Vietnam; the first unit was the 60th Company. Specialized and mobile commando units were developed. In 1961 and 1962, VPA 5th Military Region in South Vietnam was reinforced with 1,122 men from 10 specialized commando companies and a mobile battalion. VPA commandoes were tasked with conducting guerrilla warfare in South Vietnam.

Tactics to attack strategic command centers were developed during the period when American forces joined the war. VPA commandos attacked the Brinks Hotel and USNS Card in 1964, and Camp Holloway in 1965.

On March 19, 1967, VPA Special Operations was created by Ho Chi Minh, General Secretary of the Communist Party of Vietnam. The organization's first commander was Colonel Nguyễn Chí Điềm.

VPA commandos were involved in combat operations during the 1968 Tet Offensive. A report conducted by the US Commander, Naval Forces Vietnam reported 88 successful VPA frogman attacks from January 1962 to June 1969, causing 210 killed and 325 wounded for 20 sappers killed or captured. A frogman attack on the tank landing ship USS Westchester County in 1968 killed 25 and wounded 27; it was the United States Navy's single deadliest combat incident during the war.

==== The Pochentong raid ====
On the night of January 21–22, 1971, a hundred or so-strong PAVN "Sapper" managed to infiltrated through the defensive perimeter of the Special Military Region (Région Militaire Speciale – RMS) set by the Cambodian Army around Phnom Penh and carried out a raid on Pochentong airbase. Form into six smaller squad armed mostly with AK-47 assault rifles and RPG-7 anti-tank rocket launchers, the PAVN raiders succeeded in scaling the barbed-wire fence and quickly overwhelmed the poorly armed airmen of the Security Battalion on duty that night. Once inside the facility, the raiders used small-arms fire and rocket-propelled grenades against any aircraft they found on the parking area adjacent to the runway and nearby buildings; one of the commando teams scaled the adjoining commercial terminal of the civilian airport and after taking position at the international restaurant located on the roof and fired a rocket into the napalm supply depot near the RVNAF apron.

Afterward, the Khmer Air Force had been virtually annihilated. A total of 69 aircraft stationed at Pochentong at the time were either completely destroyed or severely damaged on the ground, including many T-28D Trojans, nearly all the Shenyang, MiG, T-37B and Fouga Magister jets, all the L-19A Bird Dogs and An-2 transports, the UH-1 helicopter gunships, three VNAF O-1 Bird Dogs and a VIP transport recently presented to President Lon Nol by the South Vietnamese government. Apart from the aircraft losses, 39 AVNK officers and enlisted men had died and another 170 were injured. The only airframes that remained were six T-28D Trojans temporarily deployed to Battambang, ten GY-80 Horizon light trainers (also stationed at Battambang), eight Alouette II and Alouette III helicopters, two Sikorsky H-34 helicopters, one T-37B jet trainer, and a single Fouga Magister jet that had been grounded for repairs. Pochentong airbase was closed for almost a week while the damage was assessed, wreckage removed, the runway repaired, and the stocks of fuel and ammunitions replenished.

Similar raids occurred the following year against U-Tapao Airfield which housed Boeing B-52 Stratofortress bombers, with three bombers being damaged and a Thai sentry killed.

Training of foreign commando units in Southeast Asia and Latin America

The effectiveness of the Dac Cong during the Vietnam War saw them instruct various other countries and Marxist rebel groups. From the 1970s to 1990s, they covertly provided training at the PAVN Special Forces School in Vietnam, by Vietnamese advisors assigned to the Cuban Army’s Sapper School in Cuba, and, during the 1980s, by a secret Vietnamese sapper training team stationed in Nicaragua. In addition to training Cambodian, Laotian, Soviet, and Cuban military personnel, their publications revealed that among the foreign revolutionary forces that received training in tactics, bomb-making, and the use of weapons and explosives, were members of the Marxist El Salvadoran FMLN (Farabundo Marti National Liberation Front), the Chilean MIR (Movement of the Revolutionary Left) fighting against the regime of Augusto Pinochet, as well as the Colombian FARC (Revolutionary Armed Forces of Colombia) movement.

== Units ==
- Vietnam People's Ground Force
  - 2 special forces brigades
- Vietnam People's Navy Naval Infantry
  - 1 commando brigade

== Equipment ==
=== Personal equipment ===
| Name | Image | Type | Origin | Details |
Body armors
| AG K51T Body Armour | | Body armor | Vietnam | The vest is equipped with soft armor plates capable of withstanding 7.62×25mm lead-core rounds. |
| AG K53T Body Armour | Áo_giáp_K53T | Body armor | Vietnam | The vest is equipped with hard armor plates capable of withstanding 7.62×51mm armor-piercing rounds. |
| 7.62 K56 Body Armour | | Body armor | Vietnam | The vest is equipped with hard armor plates capable of withstanding 7.62×39mm armor-piercing rounds. |
| AG-17 | | Body armor | Vietnam | A vest-style plate armor does not have pockets or may incorporate MOLLE straps for carrying equipment. It is usually worn with a chest strap for carrying gear.. |
| K23 load bearing vest | | Body armor | Vietnam | Modern battle uniform for standard Vietnamese infantry featuring the capacity to carry 3 magazines, 4 hand grenades, and 6 rounds of 40mm grenade launcher ammunition along with personal radio and bayonet. It is integrated with the MOLLE system and can accommodate 4 armor plates, up to 2 hard plates and 2 soft plates. Manufactured at the Z176 factory. |
Camouflage patterns
| K-07 Woodland | People's_Army_of_Vietnam_K07_Ground_Force_Camoflauge | Camouflage pattern | Vietnam | Replaced as the standard camo by the K-17 Woodland/K20 Pattern. Commonly used on training fatigues. |
| K11 Modified Duck Hunter Pattern | | Camouflage pattern | Vietnam | Currently replaced by K17/K20 uniform. Naval variant still in use with submarine forces. |
| K-17 Woodland | | Camouflage pattern | Vietnam | Former standard-issue camouflage for ground forces. Replaced by the K-20 and observed limited usage since 2020s. |
| Modified Duck Hunter Pattern | | Camouflage pattern | Vietnam | Used by People's Army of Vietnam Special Forces. Replaced by the Ground Forces-colored K17/K20 camouflage. |
| Ghillie suit | | Ghillie suit | Vietnam | Used by People's Army of Vietnam Special Forces. It has been introduced in International Army Games's exhibition. |
| Thermal imaging anti-reconnaissance clothing | | Camouflage pattern | Vietnam | Used by People's Army of Vietnam Special Forces. It has been introduced in International Army Games's exhibition. |

=== Weapon accessories ===
| Name | Image | Type | Origin | Details |
Scopes
| Meprolight M21 | | Red dot sight | Israel | Mounted on Uzi, AKM-1 and IWI Tavor. |
Barrel
| CornerShot | | Weapon accessory | Israel | |
Under barrel
| SPL-40 | | Grenade launcher | Vietnam | Standard issue grenade launcher accompanying the STV-380 rifles. |
| M203 | | Grenade launcher | United States | Replaces the trigger for a lever. Mounts on the Galil ACE 31/32, STL-1A, M18, M16A2 and TAR-21. |

=== Pistols ===
| Name | Image | Type | Caliber | Variant | Origin | Details |
|---|---|---|---|---|---|---|
| IWI Jericho 941 | | Semi-automatic pistol | 9×19mm Parabellum | | Israel | Often comes equipped with CornerShot. |
| Glock | | Semi-automatic pistol | 9×19mm Parabellum | | Austria | |
| TT-33 | | Semi-automatic pistol | 7.62×25mm Tokarev | Type 54/K54 K14 | Soviet Union China Vietnam | Standard issue service pistol. |

=== Submachine guns ===
| Name | Image | Type | Caliber | Variant | Origin | Details |
|---|---|---|---|---|---|---|
| Uzi | Uzimicro | Submachine gun | 9×19mm Parabellum | Mini Uzi Micro Uzi | Israel Vietnam | Used by land and underwater special forces. |

=== Assault rifles ===
| Name | Image | Type | Caliber | Variant | Origin | Details |
|---|---|---|---|---|---|---|
| STV | | Assault rifle | 7.62×39mm | STV-215 STV-022 | Vietnam | Standard issue rifle. |
| IWI Tavor | | Assault rifle | 5.56×45mm NATO | TAR-21 GTAR-21 | Israel | Used by Naval special forces. |
| M-18 | AR-15_Sporter_SP1_Carbine | Assault rifle | 5.56×45mm NATO | | United States Vietnam | The M-18 is a variant developed from the XM177E2 version of the CAR-15. Manufactured locally at Z111 Factory. |
| Galil ACE | | Assault rifle | 7.62×39mm | Galil ACE 31 Galil ACE 32 | Austria | Replaced by the domestically manufactured STV-215/STV-380. |
| AKM | | Assault rifle | 7.62×39mm | AKMS AKM-1 STL-1A | Soviet Union Vietnam | Replaced by the STV-215/STV-380 as the standard issue. |
| AK-47 | AK-47_assault_rifle | Assault rifle | 7.62×39mm | AKS | Soviet Union Vietnam | Replaced by the STV-215/STV-380 as the standard issue. |

=== Machine guns ===
| Name | Image | Type | Caliber | Variant | Origin | Details |
|---|---|---|---|---|---|---|
| RPK | | Squad automatic weapon | 7.62×39mm | | Soviet Union Vietnam | Standard issue squad-level machine gun. Manufactured locally. |
| PKM | | General-purpose machine gun | 7.62×39mm | PKM PKMS | Soviet Union Vietnam | Standard issue squad-level machine gun. Manufactured locally. |

=== Sniper rifles ===
| Name | Image | Type | Caliber | Variant | Origin | Details |
|---|---|---|---|---|---|---|
| IWI Galatz | Galil-Sniper-Galatz-r001 | Sniper rifle | 7.62×51mm NATO | SBT-7.62VN | Israel Vietnam | Manufactured locally at the Z111 Factory under the name SBT-7.62VN with free-float M-LOK handguard and adjustable stock similar to the ORSIS T-5000. |
| Dragunov SVD | | Designated marksman rifle | 7.62×54mmR | SBT-7.62M1 | Soviet Union Vietnam | Manufactured locally at the Z111 Factory under the name SBT-7.62M1. SBT-7.62M1 is the modernized variant. |
| OSV-96 | | Anti-materiel rifle | 12.7×108mm | SBT-12M1 | Russia Vietnam | Manufactured locally at the Z111 Factory under the name SBT-12M1. SBT-12M1 is the domestic copy. |
| KSVK | | Anti-materiel rifle | 12.7×108mm | SBT12M1 | Russia Vietnam | Manufactured locally at the Z111 Factory under the name SBT12M1. SBT12M1 is the modernized variant. |

=== Mortars ===
- Notice: Mortars are not a primary weapon in the inventory of the Special Operation Force Arms of Vietnam.

| Name | Image | Type | Caliber | Variant | Origin | Details |
|---|---|---|---|---|---|---|
| STA-50 (Fly-K) | | Light mortar | 50mm Mortar | | Vietnam | Silenced mortar, inspired by Belgian Fly-K design. Manufactured locally at Z117 Factory. Used by Special Operation Force Arms. |
| M2 mortar | M2-Mortar | Infantry mortar | 60mm Mortar | M2 Type 31 Type 63 | United States China | It can be used by several units in mobile combat operations. |
| 82-PM-41 | | Mortar | 82mm Mortar | 82-PM-41 Type 67 Type 53 | Soviet Union | It can be used by several units at the company/battalion level. |

=== Rocket-propelled Grenade (RPG) / Anti-armor weapon ===
| Image | Model | Type | Variant | Caliber | Origin | Details |
Rocket-propelled Grenade (RPG)
| | RPG-7V | Rocket-propelled grenade | RPG7V-VN (SCT-7) SCT-7X | 40mm HEAT | Soviet Union; Vietnam | Standard squad-level anti-tank weapon (codename B-41) with 2 launcher and 16 rocket equipped per squad. Ammunition produced at Factories Z144 and Z131 (cost ~$280/rocket), while the launcher produced by Z125 Factory. |

=== Grenade launchers ===
| Image | Model | Type | Variant | Caliber | Origin | Details |
|---|---|---|---|---|---|---|
| | Milkor MGL | Grenade launcher | MGL-VN1 (SPL-6) | 40×46mm Grenade | South Africa; Vietnam | Used by People's Army of Vietnam Special Forces. Manufactured locally by Vietnam Defense Industry (VDI) as the MGL-VN1 (industry name SPL40L). 6-round capacity. |

== Sources ==
- International Institute for Strategic Studies (2025). The Military Balance 2025. London: Routledge. ISBN 978-1-041-04967-8.
