= OPL-40M =

OPL-40M SPL-40
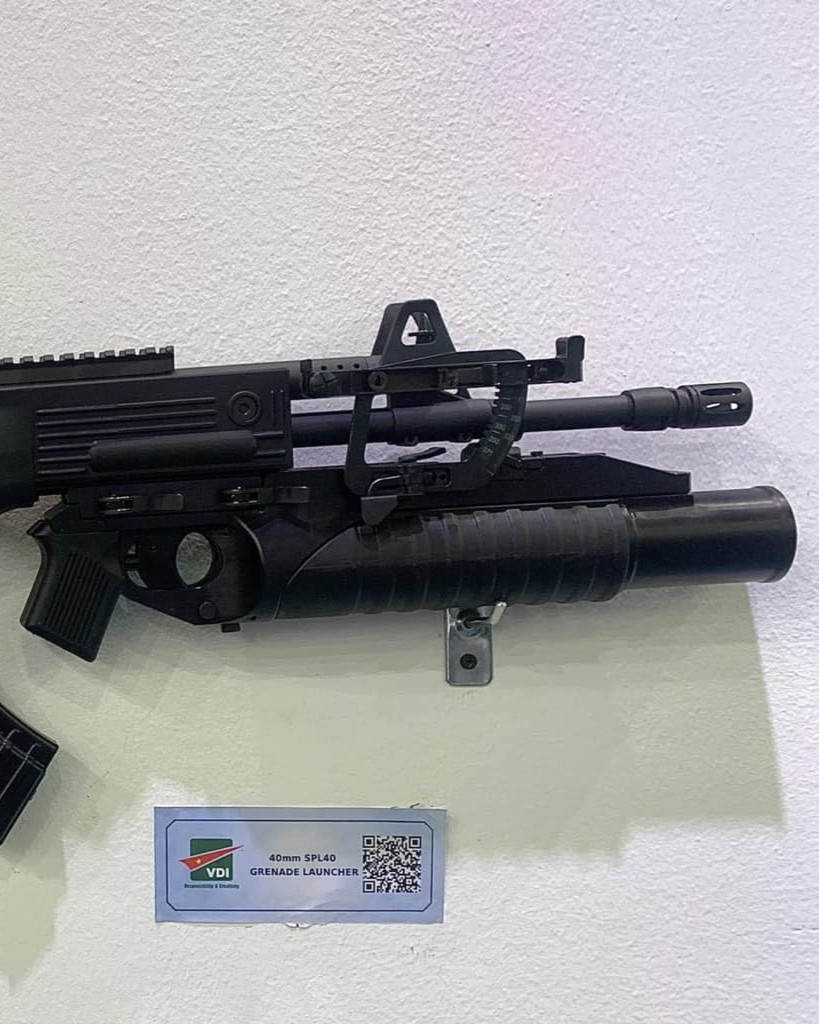
- OPL-40M grenade launcher mounted under the STV-380
- Type: Under-barrel grenade launcher
- Place of origin: Vietnam

Service history
- In service: 2010–present
- Used by: Vietnam People's Army

Production history
- Designer: Z125 Factory
- Designed: 2010
- Manufacturer: Z125 Factory
- Produced: In production

Specifications
- Mass: 1.4 kg (unloaded)
- Length: 370 mm
- Barrel length: 250 mm
- Cartridge: 40×46mm NATO
- Action: Single-shot
- Muzzle velocity: 74 m/s
- Effective firing range: 375 m (effective)
- Feed system: Manual loading
- Sights: Leaf sight and post front sight

The OPL-40M (Vietnamese: Ống Phóng Lựu 40mm), also known as the SPL-40 (Vietnamese: Súng Phóng Lựu 40mm, lit. '40mm Grenade Launching Gun'; the same designation can also be confusingly used for the Vietnamese production of M79), is an under-barrel grenade launcher (UBGL) developed by the Z111 Factory in Thanh Hóa, Vietnam.

== History ==
The OPL-40M was developed and produced by Z125 Factory of General Department of Defence Industry.

The OPL-40M was first shown in the Indo Defence 2018 exhibit which represents a step forward in Vietnam's effort to localize its defense industry.

== Design ==
The OPL-40M is chambered in standard 40×46mm NATO rounds, enabling compatibility with international ammunition standards. Its design draws inspiration from the M203 (USA), GL40 (Israel), and GP-25 (Russia), integrating the advantages of these systems to meet the operational requirements of the Vietnamese military.

The OPL-40M is designed to be mounted under assault rifles, including Kalashnikov rifles and STV rifles - Vietnam’s new standard service rifles based on the Israeli Galil ACE platform. This grenade launcher can be mounted under the STV-380 using the STV-380’s picatinny rail and bayonet lug.

The OPL-40M uses a forward-sliding and tilting barrel mechanism, allowing for the loading of longer grenade rounds.

== Adoption ==
The OPL-40M is a domestically produced launcher intended to replace earlier imported grenade launchers such as the M79 (produced locally as the SPL40), and other foreign designs like the M203 and GP-25.

== Users ==
- Vietnam: Used by Vietnamese infantry and special forces units.
