= ST5 =

ST5 may refer to:

- Space Technology 5, a NASA test of ten new microsatellite technologies
- Star Trek V: The Final Frontier, an American science fiction film
- Starship Troopers: Traitor of Mars, fifth film in the Starship Troopers film series
- ST5 (gene), a protein
- Season 5 of the Stranger Things television series

== See also ==
- STV (disambiguation)
