= DENND2C =

Protein found in humans

Identifiers
- Aliases: DENND2C, dJ1156J9.1, DENN domain containing 2C
- External IDs: MGI: 3036254; GeneCards: DENND2C

Gene location (Human)
Chr.	Chromosome 1 (human)
Band	1p13.2	Start	114,582,848 bp
Band	1p13.2	End	114,670,422 bp

Gene location (Mouse)
Chr.	Chromosome 3 (mouse)
Band	3|3 F2.2	Start	103,009,920 bp
Band	3|3 F2.2	End	103,077,085 bp
RNA expression pattern
Bgee	Human / Mouse (ortholog); Top expressed in: buccal mucosa cell; skin of arm; vastus lateralis muscle; Skeletal muscle tissue of rectus abdominis; amniotic fluid; tibialis anterior muscle; gingival epithelium; testicle; deltoid muscle; skin of thigh / Top expressed in: conjunctival fornix; esophagus; hair follicle; cornea; skin of external ear; hand; skin of back; lip; condyle; skin of abdomen; More reference expression data
BioGPS	n/a
Orthologs
Databases	NCBI: entry; OMA: entry
Species	Human	Mouse
Entrez	163259	329727
Ensembl	ENSG00000175984	ENSMUSG00000007379
UniProt	Q68D51	Q6P9P8
RefSeq (mRNA)	NM_198459; NM_001256404	NM_177857; NM_001356383; NM_001384113
RefSeq (protein)	NP_001243333; NP_940861	NP_808525; NP_001343312
Location (UCSC)	Chr 1: 114.58 – 114.67 Mb	Chr 3: 103.01 – 103.08 Mb
PubMed search
- Wikidata
View/Edit Human	View/Edit Mouse

DENN/MADD domain containing 2C (DENND2C) is a protein that in humans is encoded by the DENND2C gene.

== Gene ==
DENND2C is located on human chromosome 1 at 1p13.2 on the minus strand. The gene spans about 87,200 nucleotides. and has 21 exons.

- It is a member of the DENN (Differentially Expressed in Normal and Neoplastic cells) domain-containing protein family. These proteins regulate the activity of Rab GTPases and act as Rab-specific guanine nucleotide exchange factors (GEFs).
- DENND2C also plays a crucial role in the self-renewal of human embryonic stem cells.

== mRNA ==
The main DENND2C mRNA isoform is 6177 nucleotides long. There are three isoforms.

== Protein ==
Protein isoform 1, the longest variant, is 928 amino acids long with a predicted weight of 106.9 kDa. It is alanine-poor relative to other proteins. The theoretical isoelectric point is 8.8. The protein is found in the nucleoplasm.

== Structure ==
The three-dimensional structure of DENND2C contains a central beta sheet flanked by alpha-helices. Details about its quaternary structure are currently unavailable.

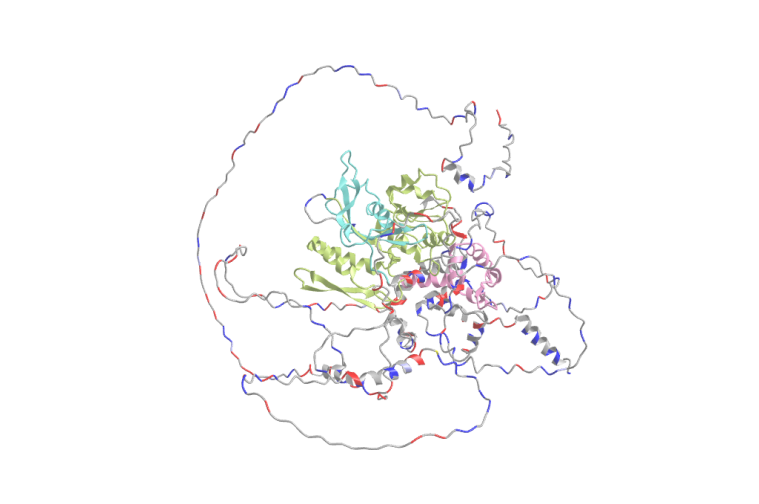
Human DENND2C 3D structure. A known phosphorylation site is highlighted in yellow. The uDENN domain is in cyan. The DENN domain is in hot pink. The dDENN is in green.

== Clinical significance ==
DENND2C’s importance in cancer is highlighted by its regulation by the tumor suppressor p53. As a guanine nucleotide exchange factor for Rab (G-protein), DENND2C plays a key role in intracellular trafficking and cellular signaling. p53 helps maintain cellular balance and prevent cancer by regulating various pathways. Since DENND2C is part of the p53-regulated network, it is predicted to be involved in cancer suppression.

Disruptions in DENND2C's function or its interaction with p53 can interfere with these pathways and contribute to tumor progression. DENND2C’s role in p53-regulated pathways can be used for developing targeted cancer therapies and identifying new biomarkers for cancer diagnosis and prognosis.

== Evolutional history ==
=== Orthologs ===
DENND2C has orthologs in most vertebrates: mammals, birds, reptiles, amphibians, and fish. This broad conservation highlights its significant role in vertebrates.

	Genus/Species	Common Name	Taxonomic Group	Med. Date of Divergence (MYA)	Accession Number	Sequence Length (aa)	Sequence Identity (%)
Mammalia	Homo sapiens	Human	Primates	0	NP_001243333.1	928	100
	Mus musculus	House mouse	Rodentia	87	XP_006501667.1	920	83.1
	Orcinus orca	Killer whale	Artiodactyla	94	XP_049566111.1	935	89.6
	Phascolarctos cinereus	Koala	Diprotodontia	160	XP_020857927.1	938	81.2
Reptilia	Chelonia mydas	Green sea turtle	Testudines	319	XP_027677849.2	938	72.5
	Podarcis muralis	Common wall lizard	Squamata	319	XP_028590394.1	927	69.9
	Python bivittatus	Burmese python	Squamata	319	XP_007429931.1	928	69.4
	Alligator mississippiensis	American alligator	Crocodilia	319	XP_059573447.1	946	67.9
Aves	Aptenodytes forsteri	Emperor penguin	Sphenisciformes	319	XP_009270985.1	932	67.5
	Gallus gallus	Chicken	Galliformes	319	XP_046788775.1	988	66.7
	Tyto alba	Common barn owl	Strigiformes	319	XP_032843159.2	1018	65.8
	Chroicocephalus ridibundus	Black-headed gull	Charadriiformes	319	XP_063212431.1	987	65.7
Amphibia	Microcaecilia unicolor	Microcaecilia unicolor	Gymnophiona	352	XP_030076672.1	941	65.4
	Hyla sarda	Sardinian tree frog	Anura	352	XP_056414351.1	944	63.1
Actinistia	Latimeria chalumnae	West Indian Ocean coelacanth	Coelacanthiformes	415	XP_064425280.1	959	58
Actinopterygii	Erpetoichthys calabaricus	Reedfish	Polypteriformes	429	XP_028652273.2	908	50.4
	Lepisosteus oculatus	Spotted gar	Lepisosteiformes	429	XP_015197870.1	904	49.9
	Amphiprion ocellaris	Clown anemonefish	Perciformes	429	XP_023154128.2	936	47.3
	Phycodurus eques	Leafy seadragon	Syngnathiformes	429	XP_061527912.1	912	45.9
	Amblyraja radiata	Thorny skate	Rajiformes	462	XP_032898655.1	1045	53

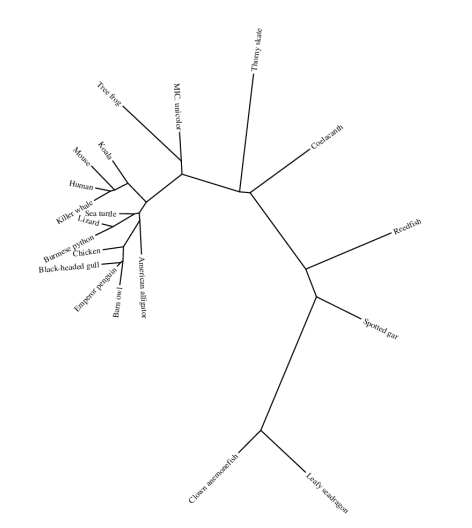
DENND2C unrooted phylo tree

DENND2C has no known orthologs in invertebrates, bacteria, archaea, protists, plants, fungi and trichoplax. DENND2C probably evolved in more advanced multicellular organisms and is important for their specific biological functions - instead of simpler life forms like the organisms listed above.

=== Parlaogs ===
DENND2A, DENND2B, and DENND2D are closely related paralogs of DENND2C.

Protein	Accession Number	Sequence Identity (%)	Sequence Similarity (%)
DENND2C	NP_001243333.1	100	100
DENND2A	NP_056504.3	43.4	57.7
DENND2B	NP_001363424.1	38.1	50.6
DENND2D	NP_079177.2	22.9	32.6

=== Rate of Evolution ===
The protein DENND2C evolves at half the rate of fibrinogen alpha and slightly faster than cytochrome C, indicating that DENND2C has a moderately slow rate of evolution.

Cytochrome c stays similar over time (highly conserved), but fibrinogen alpha changes a lot (less conserved). The graph supports the idea that genetic changes happen steadily over time (linear), as predicted by the molecular clock hypothesis.

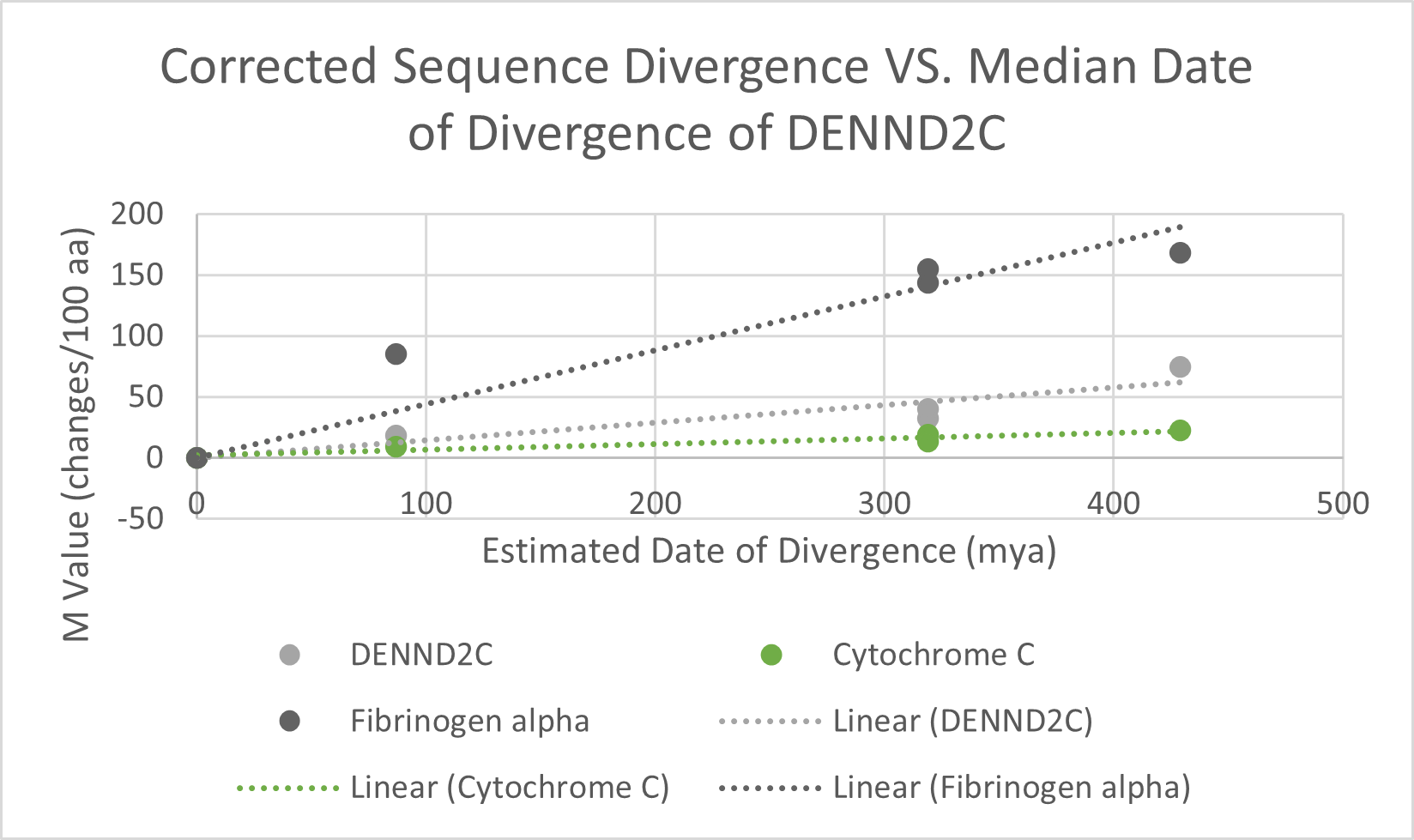
Corrected Sequence Divergence VS Median Date of Divergence of DENND2C, Cytochrome C and Fibrinogen Alpha for humans, house mouse, green sea turtle, chicken, and clown anemonefish.

== Conceptual human translation ==
Raw Human DENND2C Conceptual Translation
