= STV =

STV may refer to:

== Television ==
- Satellite television
  - Direct-broadcast satellite television (DBSTV)
- Subscription television

=== Channels and stations ===
- STV (TV channel), the brand name of ITV Network broadcasters in central and northern Scotland
  - Scottish Television, now legally known as STV Central Ltd and part of the STV network
  - Grampian Television, now legally known as STV North Ltd and part of the STV network
  - STV Radio, a radio station broadcasting to Scotland and part of the STV network
- Shanghai Television, a TV station in Shanghai, China
- STV (TV station), a TV station in Mildura, Victoria, Australia
- STV AS, Estonian television and Internet company
- Samanyolu TV, a defunct Turkish television channel
- Sapporo Television Broadcasting, a TV station in Hokkaidō, Japan and its associated radio station
- Saskatchewan Television, the former on-air brand of CFRE-DT Regina and Saskatoon
- Slovenská televízia, a Slovak public television network
- Spider Televízió, a Hungarian TV channel
- Social TV, a channel operated by UNTV (Philippines)
- Soico Televisão, a Mozambican commercial terrestrial television network
- Sunda TV, now Kompas TV Jawa Barat, an Indonesian television station based in Bandung
- Multi-Choice TV, formerly known as Subscription Television (STV)
- University of North Carolina at Chapel Hill Student Television
- STV (Uzbek TV channel), a defunct Uzbekistan television channel
- STV-US, a defunct Bangladeshi-American television channel
- STV (Kenyan TV channel), a Kenyan television channel

== Entertainment ==
- Straight to video, a movie which was never released in theatres
- Sega Titan Video (ST-V), an arcade system board used by Sega in the mid-1990s

== Transport ==
- Single-track vehicle, a vehicle that leaves a single ground track as it moves forward
- STV, the MRT station abbreviation for Stevens MRT station, Singapore
- Surat Airport, India, by IATA code

== Politics ==
- Single transferable vote, a system where a voter specifies their order of preference of the candidates, and those preferences are used to transfer votes that were originally given to candidates who are eliminated during the count
- Straight-ticket voting, the practice of voting for every candidate that a political party has on a general election ballot, or a mechanism which enables voters to vote for that party's candidates in multiple simultaneous elections

== Other uses ==
- Saint Vincent and the Grenadines, UNDP country code
- STV Group, a media holding company based in Glasgow, Scotland
- STV Inc., an American civil engineering firm
- STV Horst-Emscher, a defunct German association football club
- STV rifle, a Vietnamese assault rifle family
- St V, holiday celebrating the founding of the Free University in Brussels, Belgium
- Subjective theory of value, an economic theory
- Ship prefix for sail training vessel

== See also ==
- ST5 (disambiguation)
