= STL-1A =

Vietnamese assault rifle

- Type: Assault rifle
- Place of origin: Vietnam

Production history
- Designed: 2015
- Manufacturer: Z111 Factory
- Produced: 2015
- Variants: See Variants

Specifications
- Mass: 3.5 kg (7.7 lb)
- Length: 940 mm (37 in)
- Barrel length: 415 mm (16.3 in)
- Cartridge: 7.62×39mm
- Caliber: 7.62
- Action: Gas-operated, rotating bolt
- Rate of fire: 600 rounds/min
- Muzzle velocity: 715 m/s (2,350 ft/s)
- Effective firing range: 300 m (330 yd)
- Maximum firing range: 800 m (870 yd)
- Feed system: 30-round magazines
- Sights: STL-1B has picatinny rails for attachment of various scopes

The STL-1A (also called the STL-A1) rifle is a prototype assault rifle made in Vietnam chambered in 7.62×39mm.

== History ==
It was originally announced in 2015 that the Z111 Factory would begin producing STL-1A rifles in an occasion to celebrate Vietnamese National Day for Vietnamese defense industry accomplishments.

At the Indo Defence Expo 2018 event, a new variant which combined the STL-1A and the Galil ACE was announced under the name GK3.

Introduced as a technology demonstrator, STL-1A and its variants were not mass produced or issued by the Vietnam People's Army. Instead, the PAV adopted the STV rifles as the new standard issue service rifle.

== Design ==
As the STL-1A is based on the older AKM rifles, the Z-111 Factory would convert AKMs and its variants into the new STL-1A rifles. It also has the ability to produce these new rifles from scratch.

Although the rifle itself is an upgrade of the AKM that highly resembles a Vietnamese AK-103, it's upgraded in many areas such as new polymer handguards, folding stock, a new ergonomic pistol grip and muzzle brake based on the AK-74 with side-mounted rails to attach scopes.

A suppressor and an M203 underbarrel grenade launcher can be attached to the STL-1A.

== Variants ==
=== STL-1A ===
Main rifle.

=== STL-1B ===
STL-1A variant fitted with Picatinny rails.

== See also ==
- STV rifle
