= DENN domain-containing protein 2B =

Protein found in humans

DENND2B

Identifiers
- Aliases: DENND2B, HTS1, p126, suppression of tumorigenicity 5, ST5
- External IDs: OMIM: 140750; MGI: 108517; GeneCards: DENND2B

Gene location (Human)
Chr.	Chromosome 11 (human)
Band	11p15.4	Start	8,693,351 bp
Band	11p15.4	End	8,910,951 bp

Gene location (Mouse)
Chr.	Chromosome 7 (mouse)
Band	7 E3|7 57.27 cM	Start	109,523,911 bp
Band	7 E3|7 57.27 cM	End	109,703,605 bp
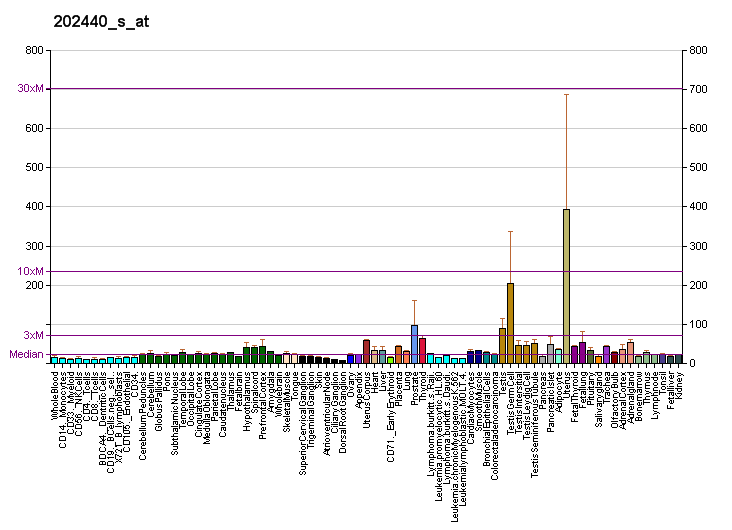
RNA expression pattern
Bgee	Human / Mouse (ortholog); Top expressed in: body of uterus; left uterine tube; right uterine tube; right ovary; gastric mucosa; muscle layer of sigmoid colon; ectocervix; left ovary; sural nerve; canal of the cervix / Top expressed in: ascending aorta; aortic valve; tunica media of zone of aorta; lacrimal gland; ciliary body; left lung lobe; spermatid; conjunctival fornix; epithelium of stomach; cumulus cell; More reference expression data
BioGPS	More reference expression data
Gene ontology
Molecular function	guanyl-nucleotide exchange factor activity
Cellular component	cytoplasm; endosome; plasma membrane; cell cortex; membrane; recycling endosome
Biological process	positive regulation of ERK1 and ERK2 cascade
Sources:Amigo / QuickGO
Orthologs
Databases	NCBI: entry; OMA: entry
Species	Human	Mouse
Entrez	6764	76954
Ensembl	ENSG00000166444	ENSMUSG00000031024
UniProt	P78524	Q924W7
RefSeq (mRNA)	NM_005418; NM_139157; NM_213618	NM_001001326; NM_029811
RefSeq (protein)	NP_005409; NP_631896; NP_998783; NP_001363424; NP_001363425 NP_001363426; NP_001363427; NP_001363428; NP_001363429; NP_001363430; NP_001363431; NP_001363432; NP_001363433; NP_001363434; NP_001363435	NP_001001326; NP_084087
Location (UCSC)	Chr 11: 8.69 – 8.91 Mb	Chr 7: 109.52 – 109.7 Mb
PubMed search
- Wikidata
View/Edit Human	View/Edit Mouse

DENN domain-containing protein 2B, also known as Suppression of tumorigenicity 5, is a protein that in humans is encoded by the DENND2B gene (previously ST5). DENND2B orthologs have been identified in nearly all mammals for which complete genome data are available.

== Function ==
This gene was identified by its ability to suppress the tumorigenicity of Hela cells in nude mice. The protein encoded by this gene contains a C-terminal region that shares similarity with the Rab 3 family of small GTP binding proteins. This protein preferentially binds to the SH3 domain of c-Abl kinase, and acts as a regulator of MAPK1/ERK2 kinase, which may contribute to its ability to reduce the tumorigenic phenotype in cells. Three alternatively spliced transcript variants of this gene encoding distinct isoforms are identified.
