= STV rifle =

Vietnamese assault rifle

7.62mm STV Assault Rifle (Submachine Gun) Súng trường Việt Nam / Súng tiểu liên Việt Nam
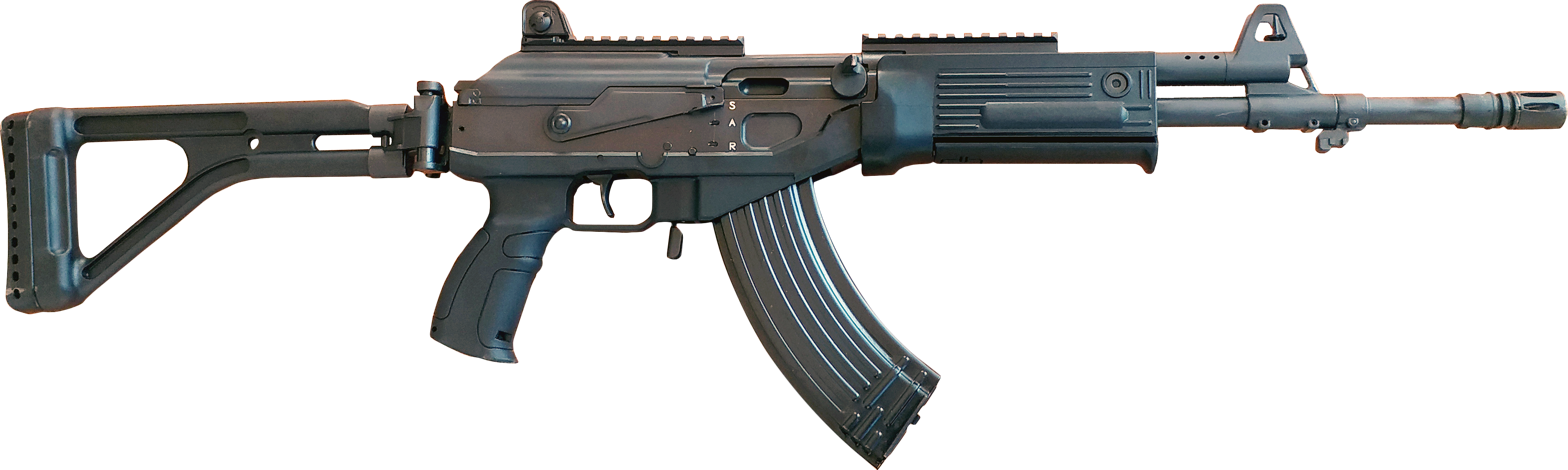
- The STV-380
- Type: Assault rifle Submachine gun Personal defense weapon
- Place of origin: Vietnam

Service history
- In service: 2019-present
- Used by: Vietnam People's Army; Vietnam Customs; Vietnam People's Public Security

Production history
- Designer: Institute of Weaponry; Z111 Factory
- Manufacturer: Z111 Factory
- Produced: 2019-present
- Variants: See Variants

Specifications (STV-380)
- Mass: 3.6 kilograms (7.9 lb) (STV-380, with empty magazine); 4.1 kilograms (9.0 lb) (STV-380, full magazine)
- Cartridge: 7.62×39mm K56; STL-5.56VN and SHMT-M1: 5.56×45mm NATO
- Action: Gas-operated, rotating bolt
- Rate of fire: 700 rounds/min
- Muzzle velocity: 700 m/s (2,300 ft/s)
- Effective firing range: 400 m (440 yd)
- Feed system: 30-round box magazine 15 or 20-round box magazine
- References: Vietnam Defence Industry

The STV (abbreviation for Vietnamese: Súng Trường Việt Nam, lit. 'Rifle of Vietnam'; or STL, Vietnamese: Súng Tiểu liên Việt Nam, lit. 'Submachine Guns of Vietnam' (Note: it should be clarified that Vietnam does not officially adopt and recognize any actual classification and definition for assault rifle, while the majority of internationally-equivalent assault rifles are formally designated as submachine guns in Vietnamese service.)) is a family of Vietnamese assault rifles and submachine guns made by the Z111 Factory and chambered in 7.62×39mm.

As of 2024, the principle variant STV-380 alongside its carbine derivatives STV-215 and STV-022 have been popularly issued to VPA units alongside other paramilitary and civilian security forces in Vietnam, step-by-step replacing and succeeding the legacy Kalashnikov rifles.

== History ==
Prior to the creation of the STV family, Vietnam considered bids from Abrams Airborne / Vltor (AV12) and the Kalashnikov Concern (AK-103), but both companies lost them with the former's internal problems forcing it to withdraw its bid.

In 2014, the People's Army of Vietnam adopted the IWI Galil ACE 31/32 as the standard-issue rifle. This included a license to manufacture them locally at the Z111 Factory. The factory immediately began modifying the IWI Galil ACE to better suit the local terrain and climate, while also implementing more Kalashnikov parts. This was done to improve familiarity and smoothen the transition from older AK-47 and AKM assault rifles, which were used by Vietnamese soldiers. The modification process was a fusion of the STL-1A and the Galil ACE, this resulted in prototypes rifle designated as the GK1 and the GK3.

In 2019, the Z111 Factory revealed two new rifles. Designated the STV-215 and the STV-380, the number at the end would indicate the length of the barrels. These two new rifles would be replacing the IWI Galil ACE 31/32 as the standard issued rifle for the People's Army of Vietnam.

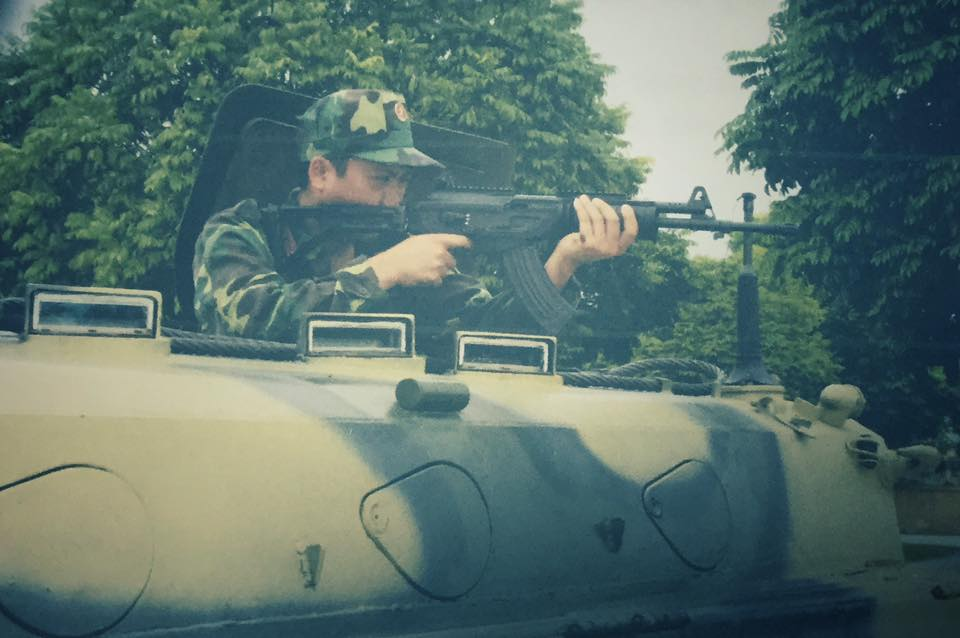
A Vietnamese soldier uses a Galil ACE 32 from a BMP-1.

In 2020, two new variants of the STV rifles were revealed. These rifles were designated as the STV-410 and the STV-416. Compared to the previous two variants, the new ones would adopt more AK parts into the guns. Currently, the STV-022, STV-215 and STV-380 remain as the standard issued rifles and being the only ones which are in mass production.

The STV-380 was seen in 2021 in parades for the first time alongside the K20 camo uniforms.

In December 2022, a new variant designated as STV-022 was revealed at the 2022 Vietnam Defence Expo. It is a further shortened variant of the standard-issued STV-215, having its stock removed compared to the bigger variants. It was also spotted being used by PAVN personnel in the same event and with the Vietnam Border Guard.

In April 2024, the STV-380 was spotted with the Vietnam People's Public Security Mobile Police, implying that the Vietnamese Police is studying the variant for adoption.

In September 2025, the STV-215, STV-380, STV-410, and STV-022 were publicly displayed at the "80 Years of Independence - Freedom - Happiness" National Achievements Exhibition.

== Design ==
The STV program was initiated to design the next generation mainline service rifles for the Vietnam People’s Army (VPA) as well as the whole Vietnam People's Armed Forces, using the technologies and experiences acquired from the IWI Galil ACE licensed production.

All STV variants are generally similar and are mainly built off of the IWI Galil ACE's milled receiver. They are all chambered in 7.62×39mm and can use any standard AK-47/AKM magazines. The numbers on the STV name indicate the barrel length. 380 indicates the standard rifle with a 380mm barrel while the 215 indicates the compact rifle with a 215mm barrel.

The rifles all have the charging handle located on the right side, which is the same for all IWI Galil ACEs manufactured in Vietnam. However, the selective-fire mechanism uses a traditional AK-based mechanism. The handguards and pistol grips are made of polymer and all of the rifles have a folding stock. A bird-cage muzzle brake is included on all rifles.

As the handguards and receiver include a Picatinny rail on top, attachments can be mounted on such as telescopic sights, red dot sights, or holographic sights. The rear sight is located at the rear of the gun. The only exception to this is the STV-416, which does not include any Picatinny rails.

Although it has brought back some traditional features of the AK series, the STV still retains the bayonet lug from the Galil ACE, which was originally designed for the M16. This allows the STV to use the M7 bayonet instead of the AK's 6Ch4.

The STV-215 and STV-380 have an additional picatinny rail located on the bottom of the handguard, commonly used for a foregrip/bipod, laser, or flashlight attachment. When nothing is attached, a plastic cover can be placed over the Picatinny rail for more comfort while holding. The pistol grip for these two are built in to the body of the rifle. These two variants also share the front-sight and gas block similar to the ones found on the IWI Galil ACE.

The STV-410 and STV-416 both lack a Picatinny rail on the bottom of the handguard. Instead, they include a mount for an underbarrel grenade launcher. They also have a slightly different magazine well and trigger rim. The pistol grip for these two variants are also independent of the body and are also based on the AK. These two variants use a folding polymer AK stock instead of the FAL PARA styled stocks used by the STV-215 and STV-380. The front-sight and gas block on these two variants are different from each other.

It was reported in 2021 that the 40mm OPL-40M (entered service as SPL-40) underbarrel grenade launcher would be used in conjunction with the STVs. The M203 can also be used with the STVs.

The smallest variant, the STV-022, largely resembles the STV-215 but having its stocks removed, further shortening the overall size of the rifle.

== Variants ==
Note that all variants are designated corresponding to their barrel lengths (except for STV-022).

=== Service models ===
==== STV-380 ====
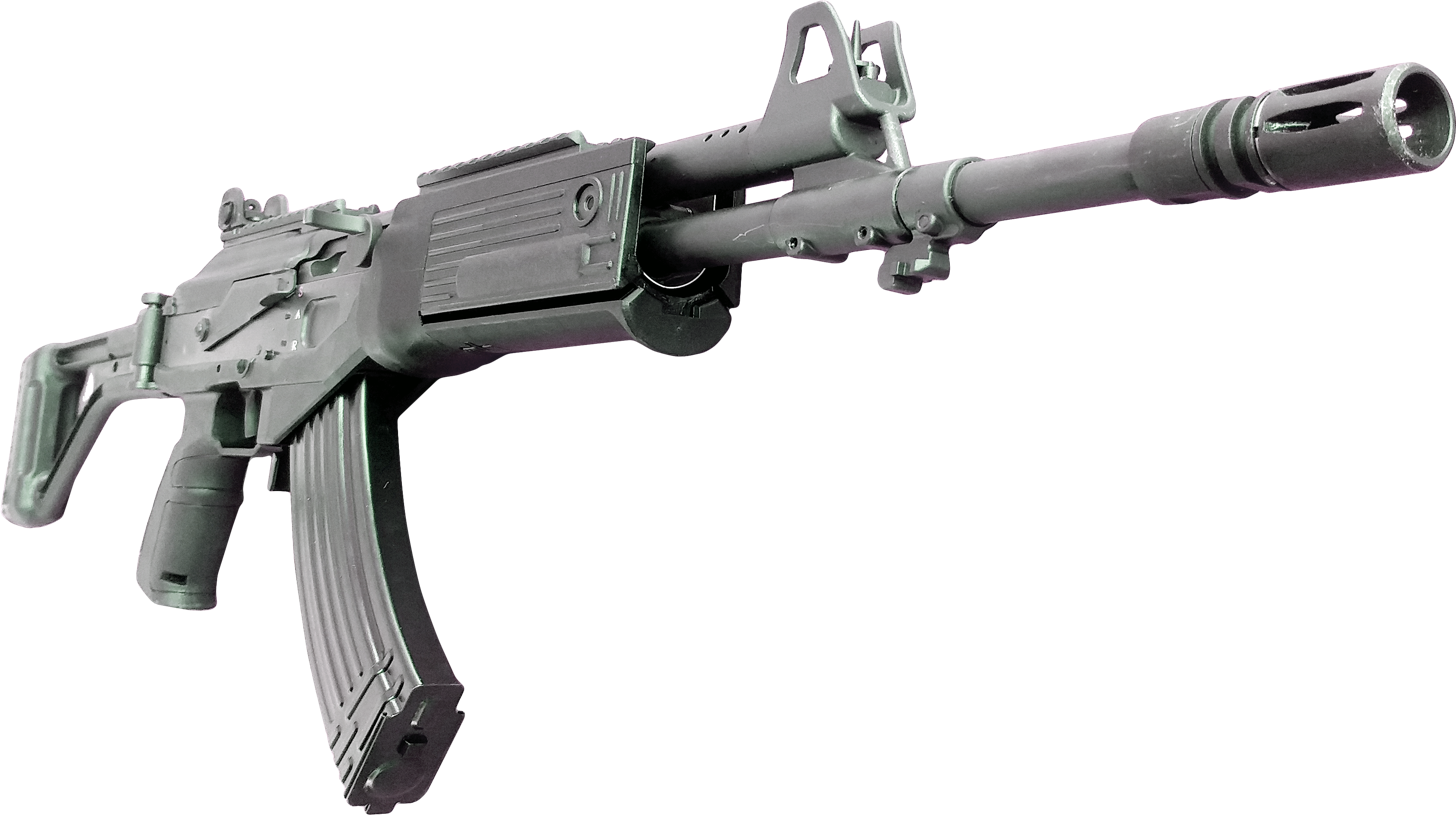
STV-380 with the view focused on its barrel and handguard

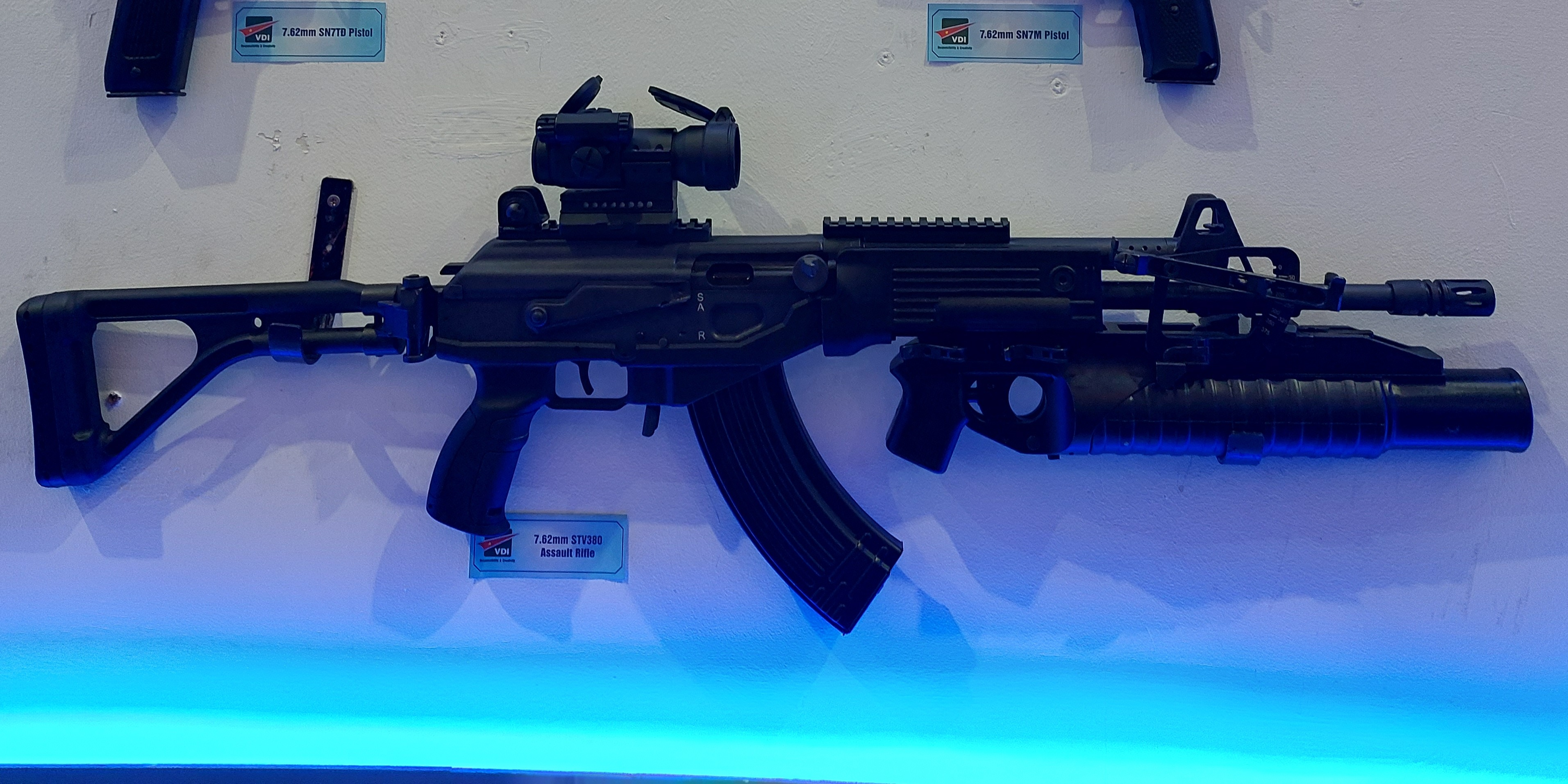
STV-380 equipped with Aimpoint PRO sight and OPL-40M

Resembling the Galil ACE 32 configuration, the STV-380 was selected as the primary infantry weapons and service rifle for the Vietnam People's Army, partially replacing and succeeding the legacy Kalashnikov. It is the Vietnamese equivalent of the Galil ACE.

The STV-380 has a foldable stock similar to the FN FAL Para. However, a variant with M18-style buttstock was also developed and revealed. It can be outfitted with an underbarrel grenade launcher.

The assault rifle weighs 4.1 kg when loaded, a muzzle velocity of 700 m/s, a range of 300 meter and a rate of 700-950 rounds per minute.

==== STV-215 ====
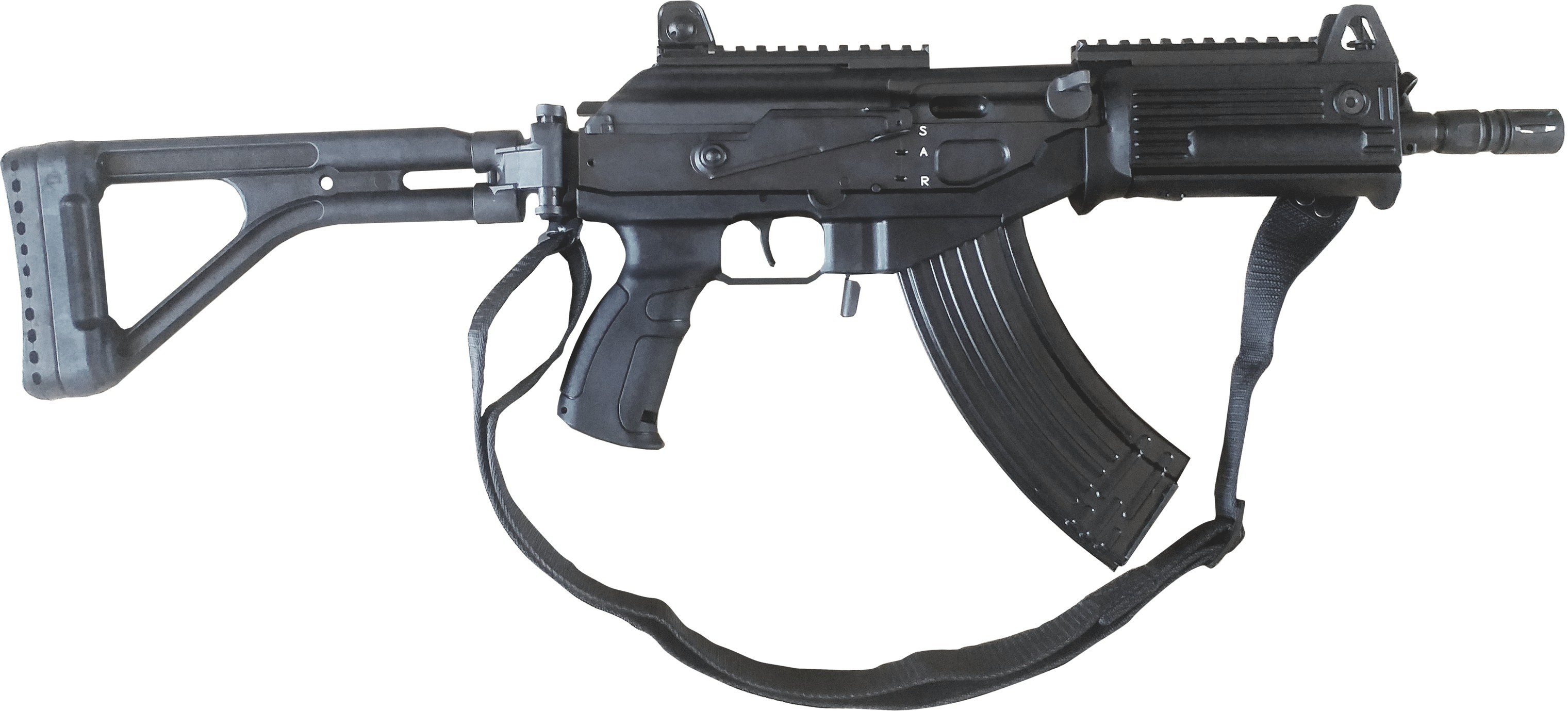
STV-215

The STV-215 is the carbine version of the STV-380 and is the Vietnamese equivalence to the ACE 31. It is similar to the STV-380 in most aspects, except the barrel length. It has an effective range of only about 250 meters and a muzzle velocity of 615 m/s.

It is used by special forces, tank crews, rear echelon troops and border guard units for its compact size and light weight.

==== STV-022 ====
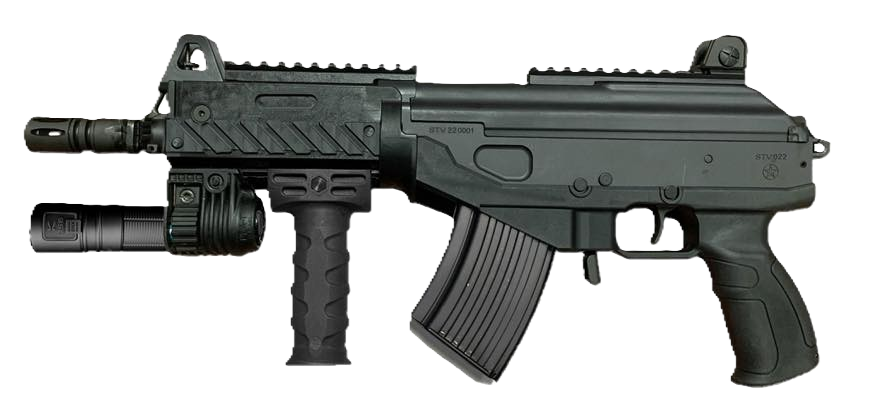
STV-022 with foregrip, tactical light and 20-round magazine

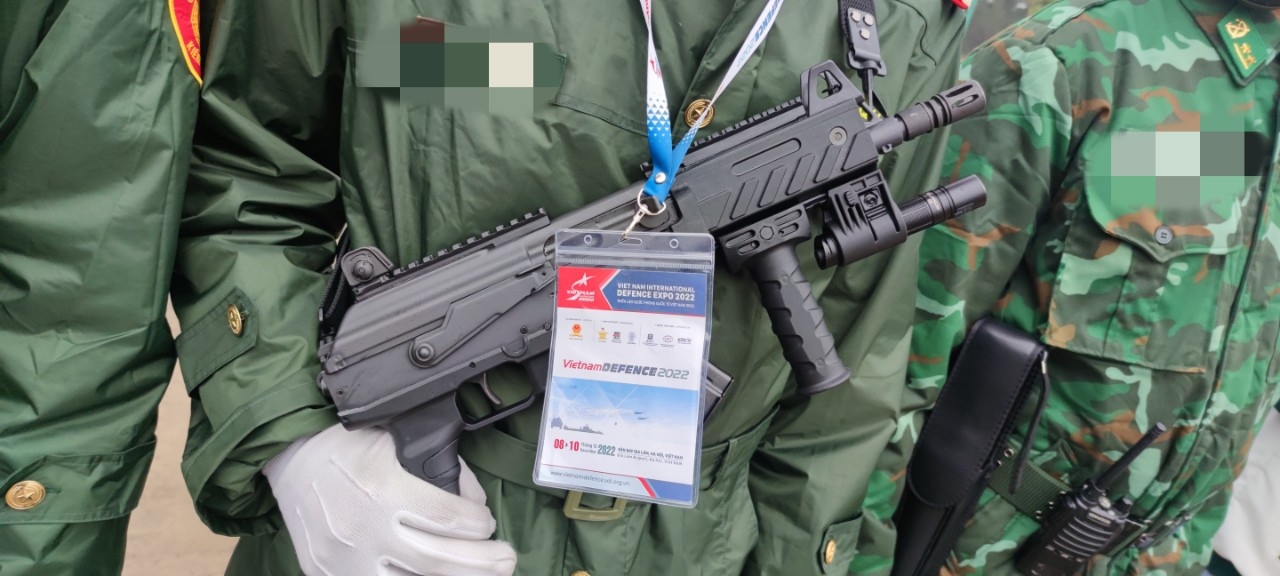
STV-022 in the hands on a Vietnamese officer

Unlike other STV variants, the "022" designation likely refers the variant's year of introduction of 2022 instead of its actual barrel length. Classified as a submachine gun, (Note: Every STV rifle is already designated as SMG under the "Vietnamese" standard, but still recognized as assault rifle in common sense) it was initially developed from the request of the General Staff of the Vietnam People's Army Guard Brigade 144 for a compact, close-ranged but powerful firearm for bodyguard and close protection purposes. The variant was originally known as STV-215CG (Vietnamese: Canh Gác, lit. 'Guard / sentry').

No further specifications were formally revealed about this rifle, but according to the publicized picture, it is the smallest variant of the STV family with the whole rifle largely resembles the STV-215, except with the stock eventually removed to further downsizing the rifle and its handguard revised. A sling loop is installed in place of where the stock is supposed to be.

Despite its compact size, the STV-022 is still chambered in 7.62×39mm. The STV-022 can be loaded with 15-round magazines, but it can also use 20-round and 30-round magazines.

The STV-022 is the next STV variant to be issued to the People's Army of Vietnam, already been spotted with the Vietnam Border Guard and special forces units.

=== Other models ===
These variants are proposed and introduced as technology demonstrators and for commercial purposes. However, they are never chosen as the service rifle by any Vietnamese security forces, due to the proven superiority and suitability of the STV-380 and its derivatives, or simply because those designs were introduced after the selection of new service rifles.

==== STV-270 ====
A version of STV-215 with a longer barrel (270 mm) to reduce the muzzle flash by burning all the excess gunpowder.

==== STV-410 ====
The build of the STV-410 overall resembles an AK-12, however with a AK-100-style solid folding stock. The handguard's picatinny rail is slightly extended to cover the entirety of the handguard.

The STV-410 weighs 3.6 kg with an effective range of 300 m, a muzzle velocity of 715 m/s, a length of 915 mm with the stock extended, and 675 mm with the stock folded.

It can be outfitted with an underbarrel grenade launcher.

==== STV-416 ====
The STV-416 is an assault rifle, which resembles an AK-103. The rifle is the only variant that does not include any Picatinny rails. Instead, it includes a side-mount for sights and a mount on the handguard for a grenade launcher.

The rear-sight is moved up to the rear of the handguard. The front-sight and gas block are similar to the ones found AK-103.

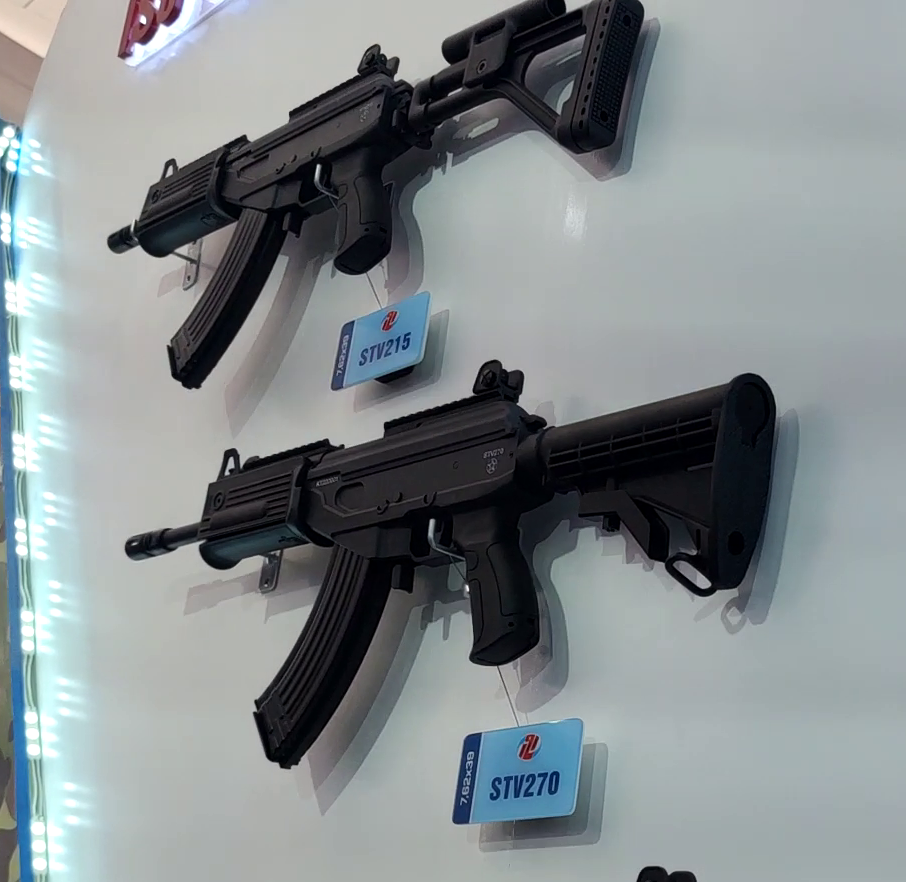
STV-215 and STV-270 with telescoping buttstock

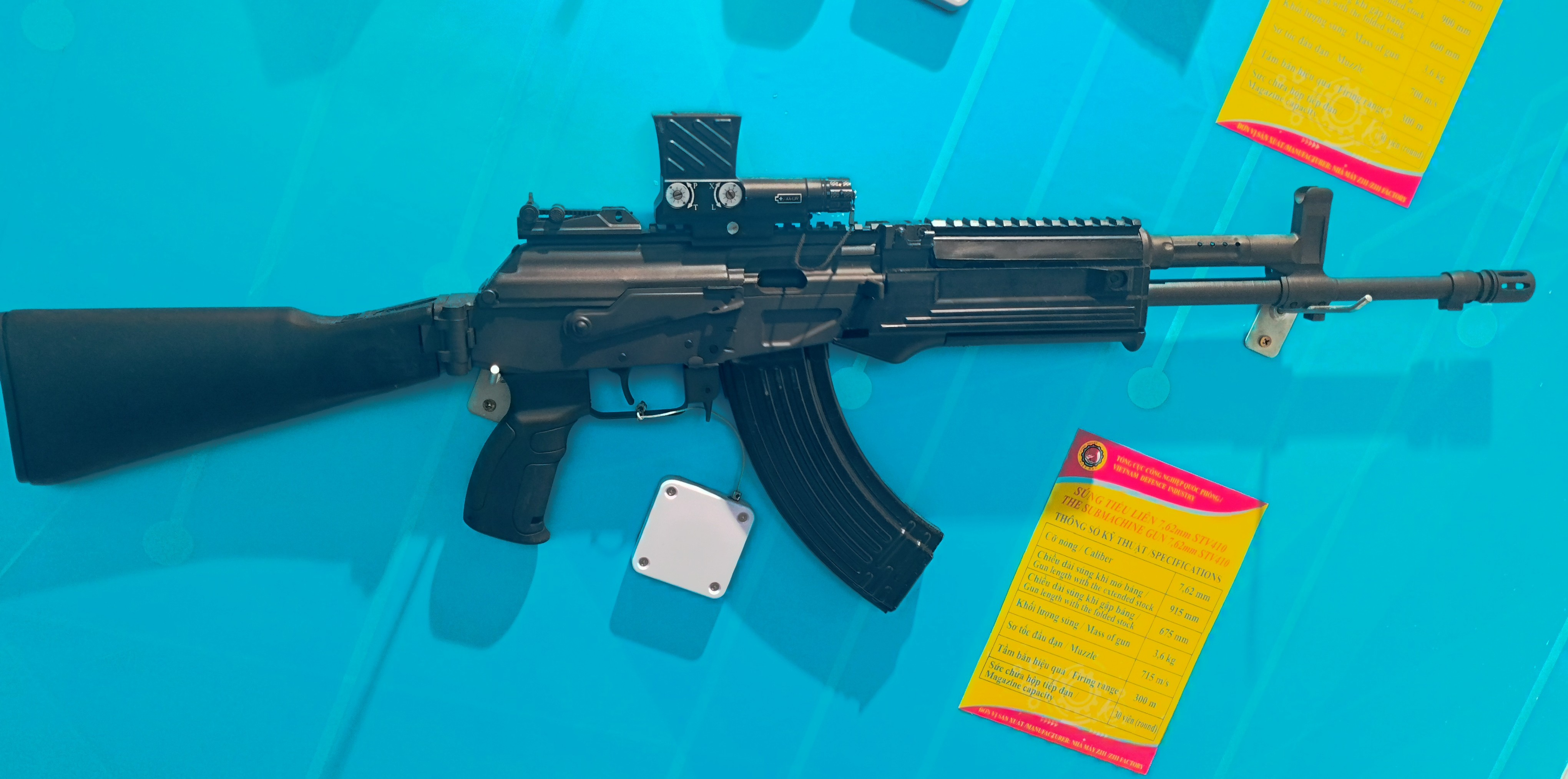
STV-410 with KBN-series red dot sight

=== Derivatives ===
These are assault rifles that largely utilize the same technology as the STV series, but are designated differently for dedicated purposes. Chambered in 5.56×45mm NATO, they are not intended to be issued to Vietnamese standing infantry.

==== STL-5.56VN ====
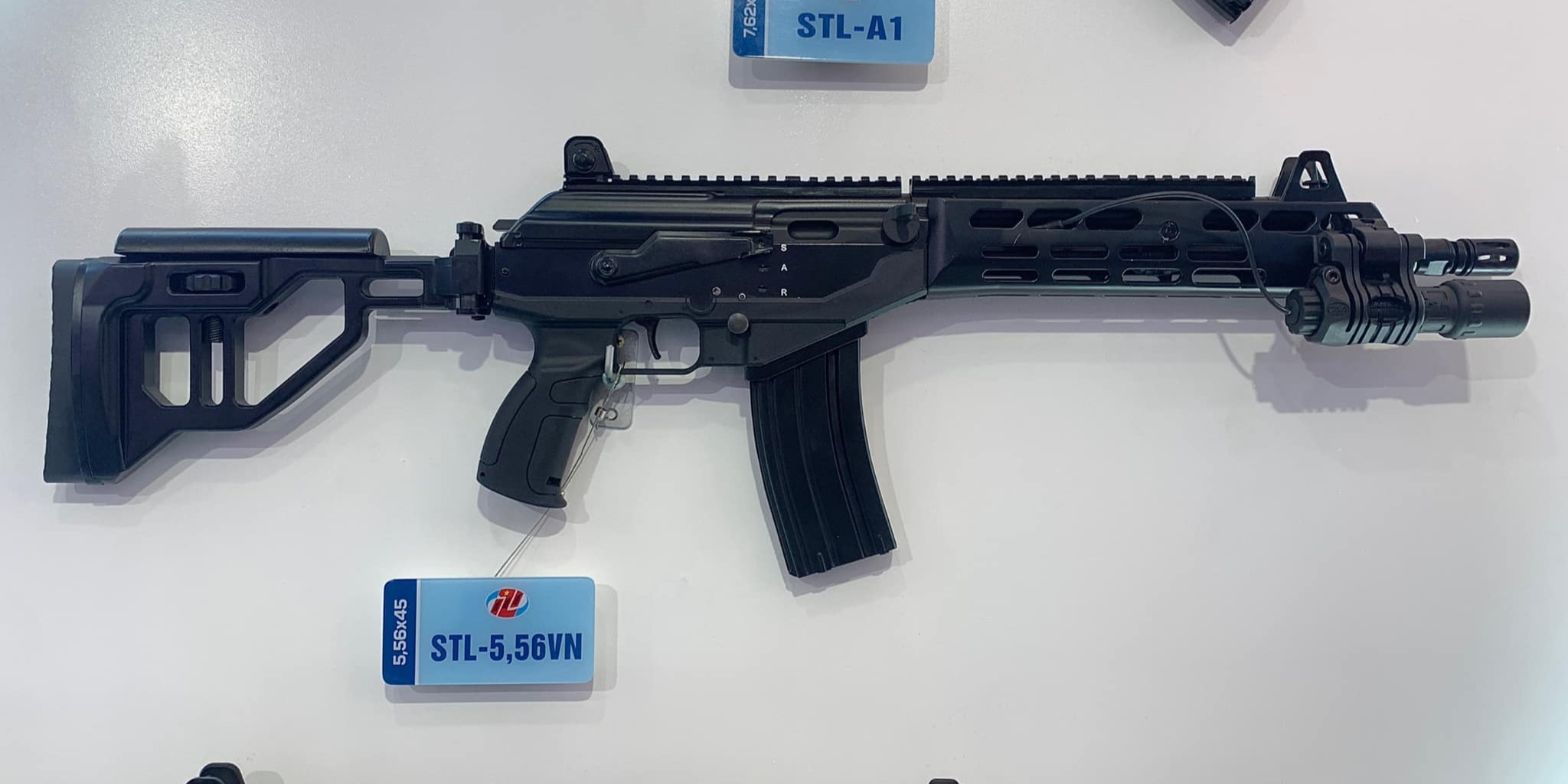
STL-5.56VN at the Vietnam Defence Expo 2024

Externally similar to the Galil Ace Gen 2, the STL-5,56VN features a receiver and handgrip quite identical to rifles in the STV series. This version includes adjustable-foldable stock, a full-length top Picatinny rail integrated with an M-LOK handguard and is chambered for 5.56×45mm NATO ammo.

The STL-5.56VN was unveiled at the Vietnam Defence Expo 2024.

==== SHMT-M1 ====
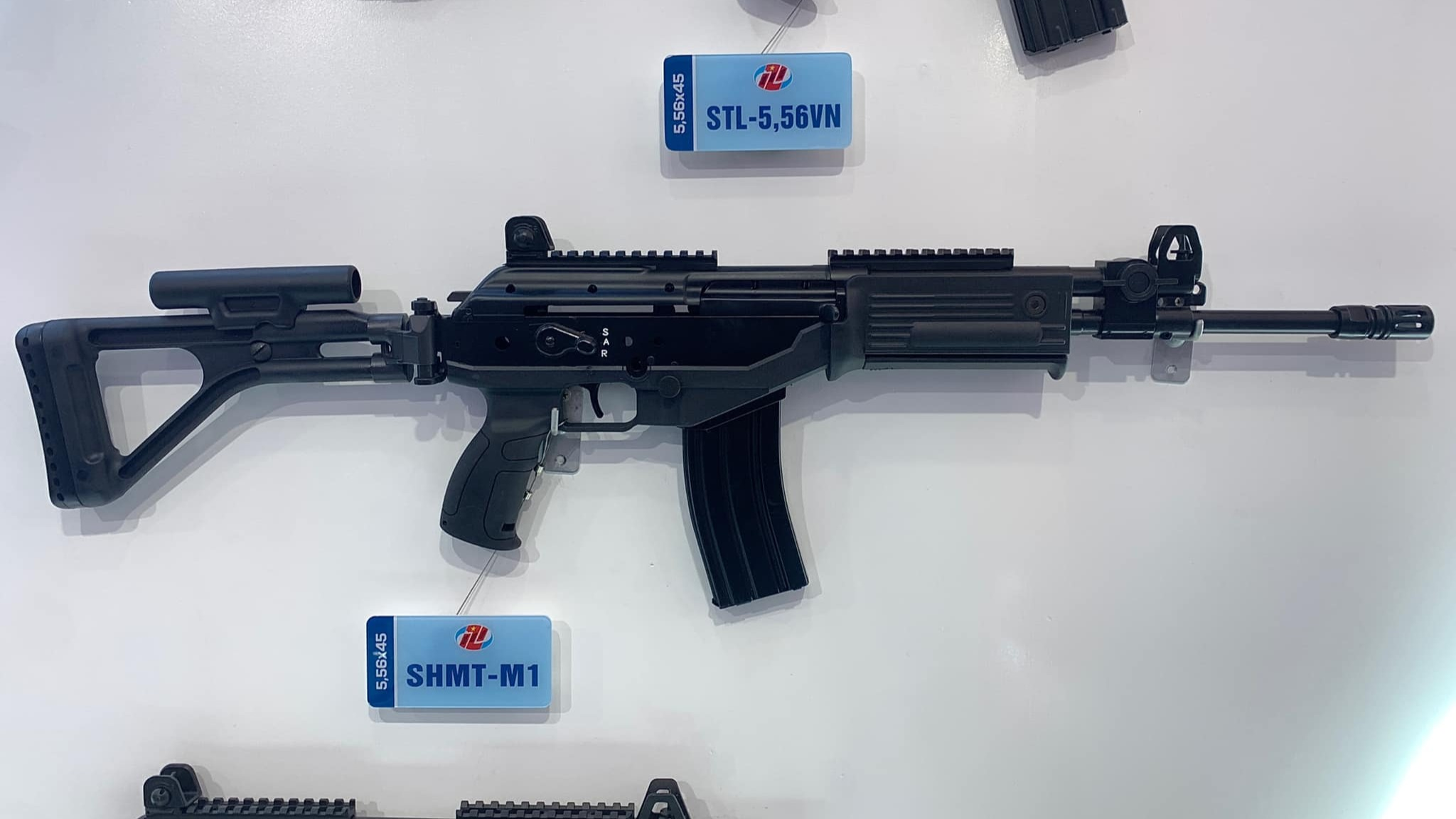
SHMT-M1 at the Vietnam Defence Expo 2024

An amphibious version based on the ACE, SHMT means “Dual-Environment Rifle" (Vietnamese: Súng Hai Môi Trường). It's being tested by Vietnamese Navy combat divers. It gas regulator to seamlessly cycle water in and out. Also features an STV-style folding stock and the original Galil Ace-style charging handle. The receiver cover has holes and cuts to allow water to escape the action more easily as the bolt carrier moves during underwater engagement. The weapon also has a magazine release button, similar to the AR-15/M4. It was reported that a special 5.56×45 cartridge was developed for this rifle for underwater shooting.

The SHMT-M1 was unveiled at the Vietnam Defence Expo 2024.

== See also ==
- IWI ACE - basis for the STV family
- STL-1A
