= Z111 Factory =

Vietnamese state-owned small arms factory

11 Precise Mechanical

- Trade name: Z111 Factory
- Native name: Nhà máy Z111
- Formerly: Z1 Factory
- Type: State-owned enterprise
- Industry: Firearm; Precision mechanics
- Founded: 1957; 69 years ago (Z1 Factory)
- Headquarters: Thanh Hóa, Thanh Hóa Province, Vietnam
- Area served: Vietnam
- Products: Pistols; Rifles; Sub-machine guns; Machine guns; Sniper rifles
- Revenue: 970,000,000,000 VND (2024)
- Owner: Vietnamese Ministry of Defence
- Parent: VDI

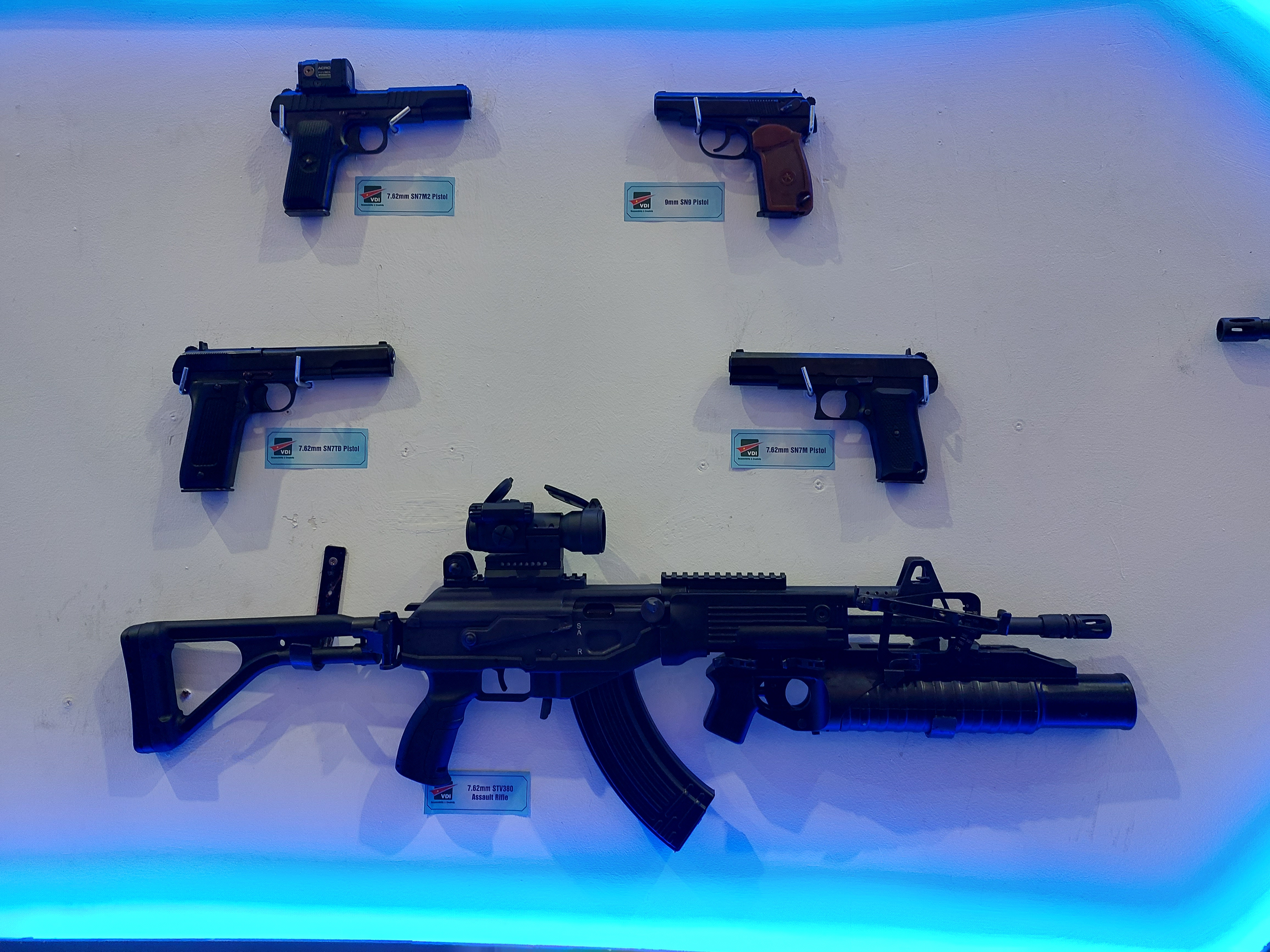
Some modern firearms produced by Z111.

The Z111 Factory (Vietnamese: Nhà máy Z111), formally registered as the 11 Precise Mechanical One Member Liability Company (Vietnamese: Công ty TNHH MTV Cơ khí chính xác 11, lit. '11th Precise Mechanical One Member LLC'), is a state-owned firearms and precision mechanics factory located in Thanh Hoá, Vietnam.

The Z111 Factory was built in 1957, and was originally called "Z1 Factory". A part of this factory (named Factory 1) was built by the Israeli firearms company, Israel Weapon Industries (IWI).

It is wholly owned by the Vietnamese Ministry of Defence, and the factory produces arms for the People's Army of Vietnam.

== History ==
Z111 factory was founded in 1/3/1957 under the name "Z1 Factory" at Yen Bai with its primary task is to repair various types of guns, artillery, and optical equipment to meet the equipment requirements for training, combat readiness, and combat missions of the Army. These facilities were built with technical and logistical support from socialist countries, marking an important step in laying the industrial foundation for Vietnam’s long-term defense self-sufficiency. The factory became a cradle of the small arms industry in Vietnam. Z1 factory specialized in producing small arms for the Vietnam People's Army during the Vietnam War, and created locally modified firearms for its army, such as the K-50M submachine gun based on the PPSh-41 and MAT-49. The factory began producing a limited number of light weapons such as SKS, AK-47, RPG-2, K-66 (based 60mm Type 63 mortar) and TUL-1 light machine guns. In the years after Vietnam War, the factory start to produce more modern firearm with support from Soviet Union such as AKM.

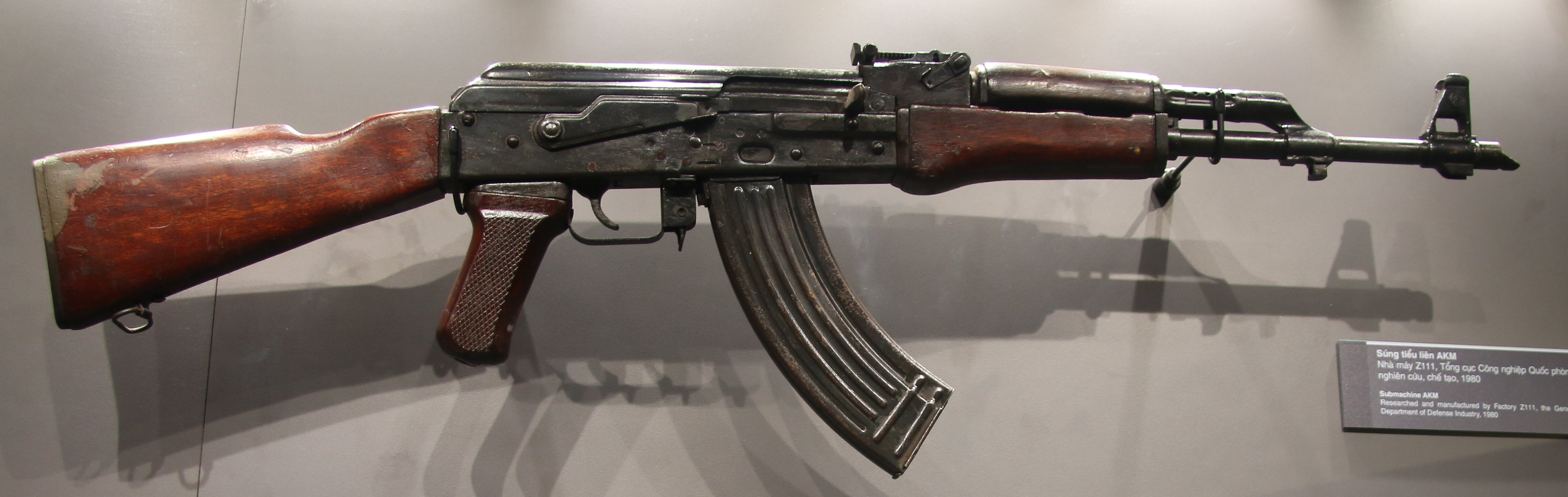
AKM produced by Z111 Factory in 1980

One of the weapons to come from the Z111 Factory is the M18, reconditioned since 2010 from XM177E2s seized during the Vietnam War. They are known to be used by Vietnamese special forces personnel and officers from the Vietnam Coast Guard due to its compact size.

On February 3, 2014, IWI entered into an agreement with Vietnam to produce the IWI ACE under license. Production was made in a joint production facility. Additionally, the Z111 factory is also involved in manufacturing several weapon components for the Israeli company IWI

An improved version of the K-54 pistol (Note: The K-54 is a version of the TT-33 used by North Vietnam.) is locally produced under the name of "K14-VN". They are upgraded with an increased capacity of 13 rounds, and a wider grip to incorporate a double stack magazine. Research and development started in 2001. The K14-VN began to see service with PAVN forces on May 10, 2014.

In 2015, the Z111 Factory announced that they would produce the new STL-1A rifle. This would mainly be done through converting and upgrading the old AKMs under the new name, but they would also produce entirely new STL-1A rifles. The updated rifle included new polymer handguards, a folding buttstock, a new ergonomic pistol grip, and an updated muzzle brake similar to those found on the AK-74. A notable change was that it also allowed the use of M203 grenade launchers that are also being produced in Vietnam, replacing the GP-25/GP-34 grenade launchers on the original AKMs. The rifle, however, still uses the dovetail side-mount for attaching sights. Overall, the rifle highly resembles an AK-103. In January 2018, the OSV-96 was reported to be made under license in Vietnam.

In 2019, the factory revealed the new STV rifles based on Galil ACE, the STV-215 and the STV-380. Both of them were designated to be the new standard-issue rifles for the Vietnam People's Army. Component of IWI Jericho 941 pistols were also reported being manufactured, most likely for a production contract between the factory and IWI. In 2020, the factory revealed two more variants of the STV rifles, called the STV-410 and the STV-416.

== Products ==
Model	Image	Type	Calibre	Notes
Pistols
K14-VN		Semi-automatic pistol	7.62×25mm Tokarev	Vietnamese variant of the K-54, this version is improved with a longer barrel, a rubber grip, and a double-stack magazine that holds an increased capacity of 13 rounds.
IWI Jericho 941	Jehrico 941 F	Semi-automatic pistol	9×19mm Parabellum	Pistols are manufactured with a steel frame.
SN19		Semi-automatic pistol	9×19mm Parabellum	Vietnamese variant of the Glock
SN7VN-M24		Semi-automatic pistol	7.62×25mm Tokarev	Vietnamese variant of the Glock using 7.62×25mm Tokarev.
Assault Rifles
M18	USAF GAU-5A	Carbine	5.56×45mm NATO	Reconditioned version of the CAR-15, it is used by special forces and marines.
IWI ACE 31/32	IWI 3686	Assault rifle	7.62×39mm	Manufactured under IWI license, all rifles produced here have their charging handle relocated from the left side onto the right side. There are rumors that production has ceased in favor of the new Vietnamese-designed STV rifles.
STV-215		Assault rifle	7.62×39mm	Standard issued rifle. Carbine version with a 215mm barrel length.
STV-270		Assault rifle	7.62×39mm	Version of STV-215 with a longer barrel.
STV-380	STV3801	Assault rifle	7.62×39mm	Standard issued rifle for Vietnam People's Army. Based on IWI ACE and STL-1A. See STV rifles for more.
STV-410		Assault rifle	7.62×39mm	Handguard, gas block, and stock adjustments. 410mm barrel. See STV-410 for more info.
STV-416		Assault rifle	7.62x39mm	Handguard, gas block, and stock adjustments. See STV-416 for more info.
STL-1A		Assault rifle	7.62×39mm	Old AKMs are converted into the STL-1A
AK-47	АК-47	Assault rifle	7.62×39mm	Vietnamese upgrades made with brown plastic furniture.
AKN		Assault rifle	7.62×39mm	Vietnamese version of KM-AK, comes with a Bakelite plastic stock, handguard, and grips
Submachine Guns
STL-15		Submachine gun	9×19mm Parabellum	Locally produced with industrial name SN9P and officially called the STL-15. It is the Vietnamese-produced version of the PP-19 Bizon. It comes with a Galil-style stock and is chambered in 9x19mm.
Micro Uzi		Submachine gun	9×19mm Parabellum	Manufactured and supplied to the PAVN.
Uzi Pro		Submachine gun	9×19mm Parabellum	Manufactured and supplied to the PAVN.
Machine Guns
IWI Negev		Light machine gun	5.56×45mm NATO	Manufactured and supplied to the Vietnamese Naval Infantry.
PKM	7,62 KK PKM Helsinki 2012	General-purpose machine gun	7.62×54mmR	Modernized production is designated as the ĐN7L. It is the standard issued machine gun for the PAVN. New copies are made with a modern plastic stock and grip, and includes a picatinny rail for a sight on top. Older copies are also being modernized with the same features.
NSV		Heavy machine gun	12.7×108mm	Standard for tank-mounted machine guns.
M134 Minigun		Rotary medium machine gun	7.62×51mm NATO	Domestic made copy of original variant of US M134 Minigun.
Sniper Rifles
IWI Galatz		Sniper rifle	7.62×51mm	Manufactured and supplied to the PAVN.
OSV-96	ОСВ-96 12,7-мм снайперская винтовка - МАКС-2009 02	Anti-materiel rifle	12.7×108mm	Made under license with the industrial name of SBT12M1.
KSVK	KSVK1	Anti-materiel rifle	12.7×108mm	Vietnamese manufacture. Features modifications to suit the local conditions.
Grenade-Based Weapons
OPL40M / T-40		Grenade launcher	40mm grenade	A Vietnamese-designed grenade launcher. Based on the M203 grenade launcher, except it uses a lever instead of a trigger. Commonly mounted onto the AKN, STV-215/380/410, and IWI ACE 32 rifles.

== See also ==
- List of equipment of the Vietnam People's Ground Forces
