= IWI Galil ACE =

Series of assault and battle rifles

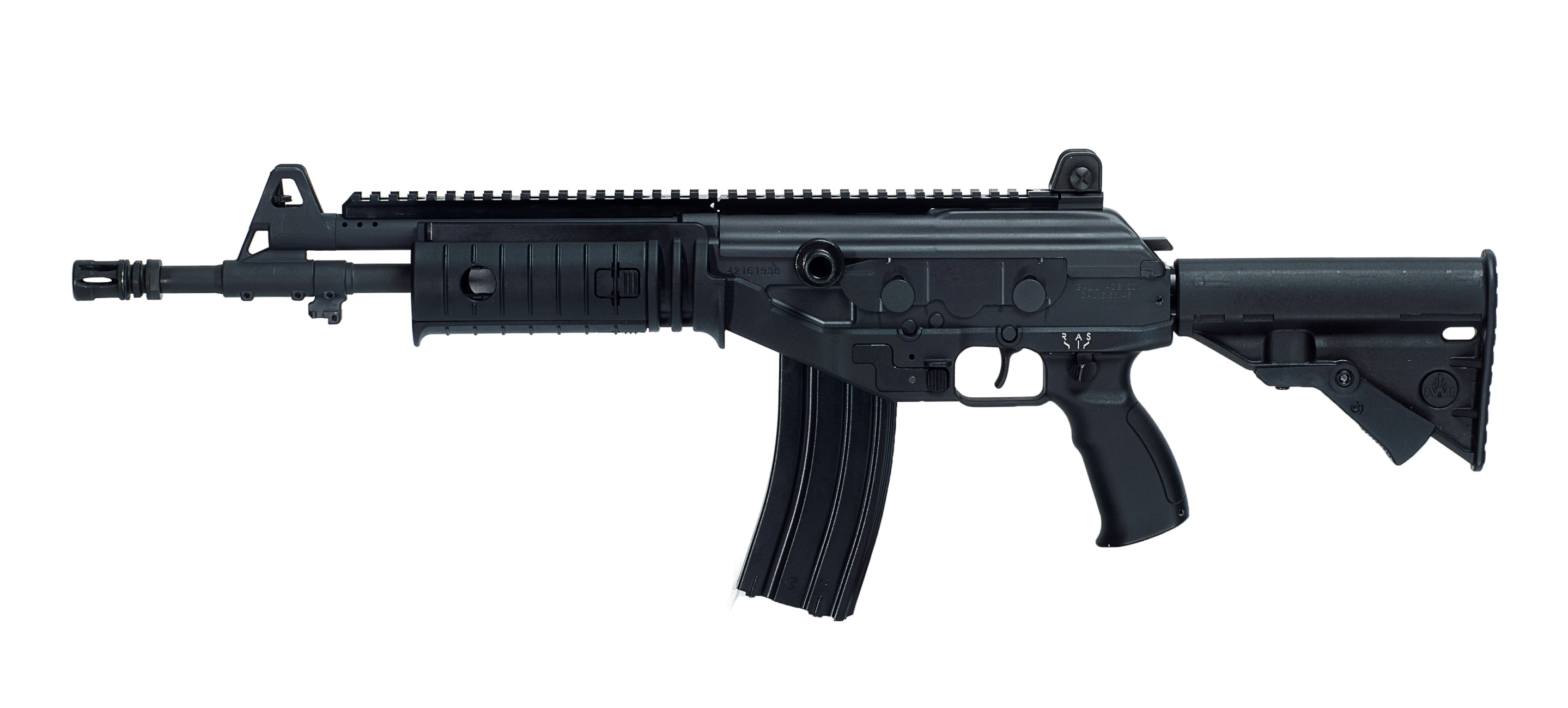
- Galil ACE 22
- Type: Assault rifle Battle rifle
- Place of origin: Israel

Service history
- In service: 2008–present
- Used by: See Users
- Wars: Colombian conflict Mexican drug war

Production history
- Designer: Israel Military Industries
- Manufacturer: Israel Weapon Industries (Formerly Israel Military Industries); Also produced under license by: FAMAE (Chile); Indumil (Colombia); RPC Fort (Ukraine); Z111 Factory (Vietnam)
- Produced: 2008–present
- Variants: See Variants

Specifications
- Cartridge: 5.45×39mm 5.56×45mm NATO; 7.62×39mm 7.62×51mm NATO
- Action: Gas-operated, rotating bolt
- Rate of fire: 620–880 rounds/min
- Muzzle velocity: 600 to 915 m/s (1,970 to 3,000 ft/s)
- Effective firing range: 300 to 500 m (330 to 550 yd)
- Feed system: Detachable box magazines: 35-, 50-round Galil magazines; STANAG magazines; AKM magazines (ACE 31, ACE 32); 25-round 7.62mm Galil magazines (ACE 52, ACE 53); SR-25 pattern magazines (ACE-N 52); AK-74 magazines (IWI US Galil ACE 5.45×39mm)
- Sights: Tritium front post and rear diopter iron sights, or Picatinny rail for various optical sights

The IWI Galil ACE, also marketed as IWI ACE (or simply ACE), is a series of assault rifles and battle rifles originally developed and manufactured by Israel Weapon Industries (IWI) produced in 5.56×45mm NATO, 7.62×39mm and 7.62×51mm NATO.

== Design details ==
The IWI Galil ACE series is based upon the original design of the Galil, but instead utilises a modern design to increase its accuracy and lower its weight, while maintaining the original Galil's ergonomics, ease of maintenance and reliability under battle conditions.

In the design, emphasis was particularly placed on increasing the reliability and accuracy under adverse battlefield conditions.

=== Weight reduction ===
The original Galil was built with a machined solid steel billet action in order to increase the structural integrity and survivability of the weapon. Unfortunately, this design resulted in a total weight of up to 9.6 lb (4.4 kg), depending on its variant, which was one of the primary criticisms from the Israel Defense Forces.

The Galil ACE has a significantly reduced weight. IWI redesigned the action to integrate the steel with polymer, which is much lighter than the fully steel receiver of the original Galil.

While the upper receiver is machined steel and the receiver top features a MIL-STD-1913 Picatinny rail, polymer has been introduced to the lower receiver of the weapon to reduce the gun's weight.

=== Accuracy ===
According to American Rifleman: "Although this rifle is clearly based on the AK design, it demonstrated a superior level of accuracy potential compared to several of its cousins. The best single group of [5 rounds at 100 yards] of 0.83″ and five-group average of 0.98″ was produced using the Federal Premium 123-gr. [8.0 g] Power-Shok soft-point load" (testing done using 7.62×39mm 16-inch barrelled variant).

=== Trigger ===
The Galil ACE adopts the Galil Sniper trigger instead of the original Galil trigger, in order to improve accuracy compared to the standard Galil. This is a two-stage trigger, which IWI have modelled on the two-stage trigger of the M1 Garand.

According to American Rifleman, the two-stage trigger is "clean and smooth with a 4 lb. 13 oz. [4.8 lb_{f}, 21.4 N] trigger pull according to a Lyman digital trigger gauge".

=== Gas tube ===
The gas tube, unlike the AK-47 system, is mounted on the rifle via a dovetailed slide machined on the receiver upper-front block. This avoids any movement of the gas block influencing barrel vibration, which would degrade accuracy.

=== Long-stroke piston system ===
The rifle uses the Galil's long-stroke piston system. The long-stroke system is found in the M1 Garand, AK-47 (upon which the Galil's internal mechanism design borrowed heavily) and more recently in the IWI Tavor.

=== Barrel ===
The barrel is chrome-lined, cold hammer-forged, with a 1:7″ twist for 5.56×45mm NATO, 1:7.5″ for 5.45×39mm, 1:9.5″ for 7.62×39mm, and 1:12″ for 7.62×51mm NATO.

=== Sights ===
The Galil ACE has a fully adjustable iron sights with tritium front post and two dot tritium rear aperture. It also features a Picatinny rail for mounting various optical sight.

=== Stock ===
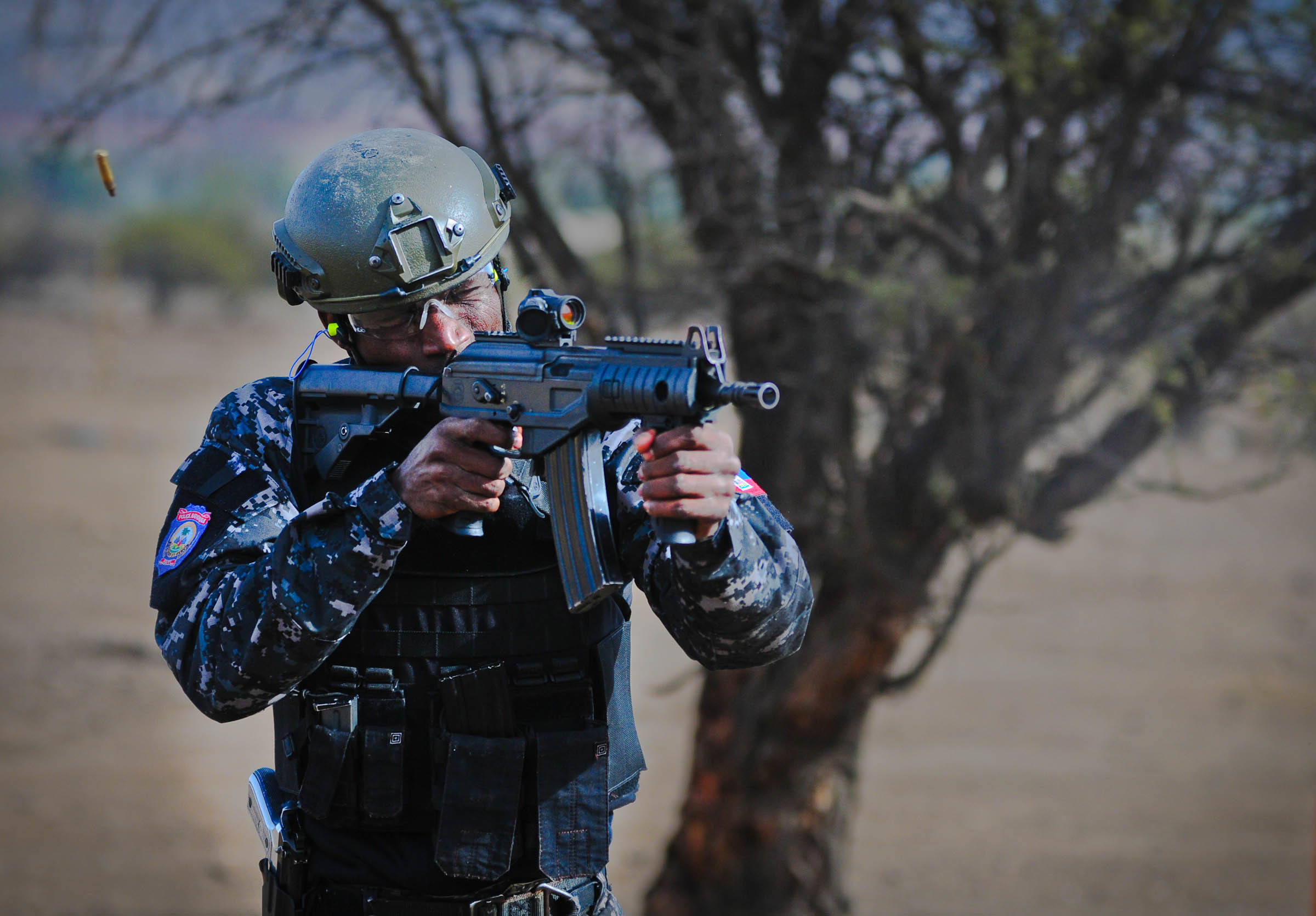
Officer from the Haitian National Police SWAT team (GIPNH) with a Galil ACE 21 during a training exercise in Santiago, Chile

The standard buttstock found on the Galil ACE is a six-position telescopic stock that can be fitted with an optional cheek-piece to improve the sighting of the weapon when using an optical sight. An optional right folding version of the standard buttstock is also available.

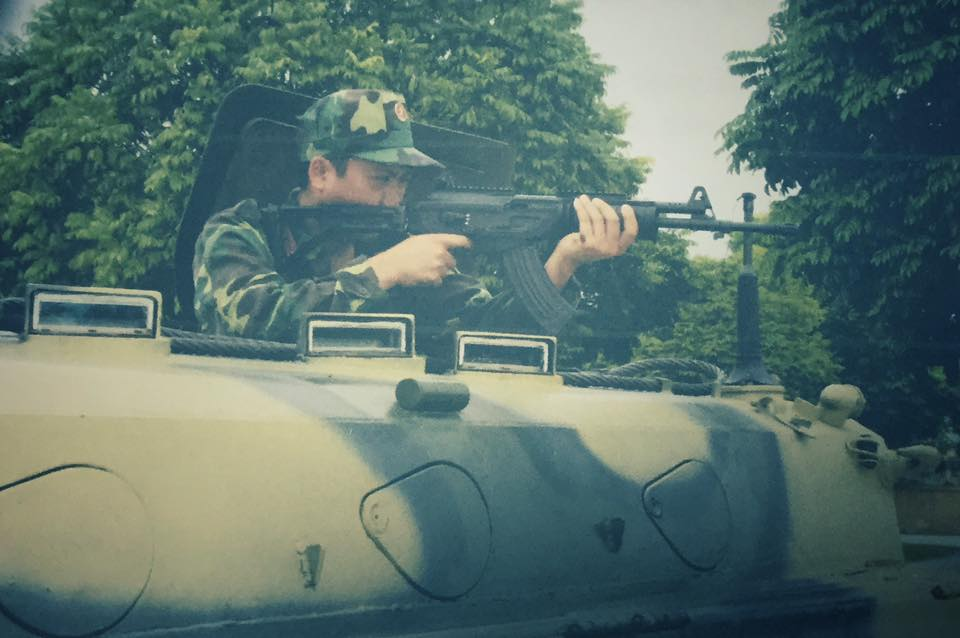
Vietnamese-assembled Galil ACE 32 with a folding stock.

The forearm consists of MIL-STD-1913 Picatinny rails on the bottom and both sides for mounting accessories such as aiming optics. The side forearm rails have central grooves to provide routing channels for electric wiring used by pressure switch activated accessories. The forearm comes with quick detachable polymer covering panels that can be mounted to protect the rails when a side or bottom rail has no accessories mounted to it. The gas tube above the barrel also has a Picatinny rail mounted on top that is aligned with the rail mounted on the cover over the receiver.

=== Last round bolt catch ===
Another addition by IWI to the original Galil is the last round bolt catch (for variants of the ACE in 5.56×45mm NATO only). The bolt hold-open feature is a common request of military customers, to reduce reloading times during combat.

== Variants ==
Variant	Calibre	Barrel length	Length (extended)	Length (retracted)	Weight (unloaded)	Feed system	Muzzle velocity	Range	Cyclic rate of fire
ACE 21	5.56×45mm NATO	216 mm (8.5 in)	730 mm (29 in)	650 mm (26 in)	3.00 kg (6.61 lb)	35-round Galil magazine	710 m/s (2,300 ft/s)	300 m (330 yd)	680–880 rounds/min
ACE-N 21	5.56×45mm NATO	216 mm (8.5 in)	730 mm (29 in)	650 mm (26 in)	3.05 kg (6.7 lb)	30-round NATO magazine	710 m/s (2,300 ft/s)	300 m (330 yd)	680–880 rounds/min
ACE 22	5.56×45mm NATO	335 mm (13.2 in)	847 mm (33.3 in)	767 mm (30.2 in)	3.40 kg (7.5 lb)	35-round Galil magazine	850 m/s (2,800 ft/s)	—	680–880 rounds/min
ACE-N 22	5.56×45mm NATO	335 mm (13.2 in)	847 mm (33.3 in)	767 mm (30.2 in)	3.45 kg (7.6 lb)	30-round NATO magazine	850 m/s (2,800 ft/s)	—	680–880 rounds/min
ACE 23	5.56×45mm NATO	463 mm (18.2 in)	976 mm (38.4 in)	896 mm (35.3 in)	3.60 kg (7.9 lb)	35-round Galil magazine	915 m/s (3,000 ft/s)	500 m (550 yd)	680–880 rounds/min
ACE 31	7.62×39mm	216 mm (8.5 in)	730 mm (29 in)	650 mm (26 in)	3.00 kg (6.61 lb)	30-round AK-47 magazine	600 m/s (2,000 ft/s)	—	680–880 rounds/min
ACE 32	7.62×39mm	409 mm (16.1 in)	927 mm (36.5 in)	847 mm (33.3 in)	3.50 kg (7.7 lb)	30-round AK-47 magazine	680 m/s (2,200 ft/s)	—	680–880 rounds/min
ACE 52	7.62×51mm NATO	409 mm (16.1 in)	954 mm (37.6 in)	874 mm (34.4 in)	3.60 kg (7.9 lb)	25-round 7.62mm Galil magazine	800 m/s (2,600 ft/s)	—	620–680 rounds/min
ACE-N 52	7.62×51mm NATO	409 mm (16.1 in)	954 mm (37.6 in)	—	3.60 kg (7.9 lb)	SR-25 pattern magazine	—	—	620–680 rounds/min
ACE 53	7.62×51mm NATO	511 mm (20.1 in)	1,055 mm (41.5 in)	963 mm (37.9 in)	3.8 kg (8.4 lb)	25-round 7.62mm Galil magazine	860 m/s (2,800 ft/s)	—	620–680 rounds/min

=== Gen II ===
IWI US introduced the Gen II line in 2023 which introduced a free-floating M-LOK handguard and M4-style compatible buttstock.

=== Civilian variants ===
In October 2020, IWI US began production of an "extremely limited edition" 5.45×39mm variant of the Galil ACE, available with a 16 in (410 mm) or 8.3 in (210 mm) barrel, producing a total of 545 rifles in each size. They are compatible with AK-74 magazines.

=== Foreign variants ===
==== Colombian variant ====
The Córdova is a Colombian Galil ACE variant produced under license via an agreement between Indumil and IWI.

==== Chilean variant ====
The FAMAE has been producing licensed Galil ACE variants since 2014 as the Chilean Armed Forces' service rifle.

==== Indian variant ====
PLR Systems, a subsidiary of Adani Defence was selected as the L2 bidder for a contract to supply 170,085 carbines worth about ₹1,100 crore (equivalent to ₹11 billion or US$120 million in 2026) to the Indian Army and the Indian Navy as a replacement for ageing Sterling submachine guns. They will manufacture an optimised variant of the Galil ACE CQB under the production name Jeet, with deliveries to bring as soon as 2027. It features a 368 mm long barrel, a weight of 3.2 kg, and a rate of fire between 650-750 rounds per minute to a 300–500 m range. The contract for 255,128 DRDO Close Quarter Battle carbines and 170,085 Adani Jeet carbines was signed on 30 December 2025.

==== Peruvian variant ====
The Peruvian government has plans to produce the ACE under license, establishing a factory to produce up to 2,000 rifles per month.

==== Ukrainian variants ====
The RPC Fort has been producing licensed Galil ACE variants since 2014:

Variant	Original model	References
Fort-227	ACE 22	
Fort-228	ACE 31	
Fort-229	ACE 52	

==== Vietnamese variants ====
The IWI has established a $100 million factory in Vietnam via the Z111 Factory, to produce an unspecified number of Galil ACE assault rifles for the PAVN.

All ACEs used in Vietnam have the charging handles located at the right side of the rifle and replaced the Galil ACE handguards with traditional Galil-style handguards with Picatinny rail on top, replaced standard ACE buttstock with FN-FAL Paratrooper stocks, with modifications for simpler production and ease of use, the original fire selector replaced with AK-style fire selector. The new rifle has its new designations STV-215 and STV-380, the number indicated barrel length.

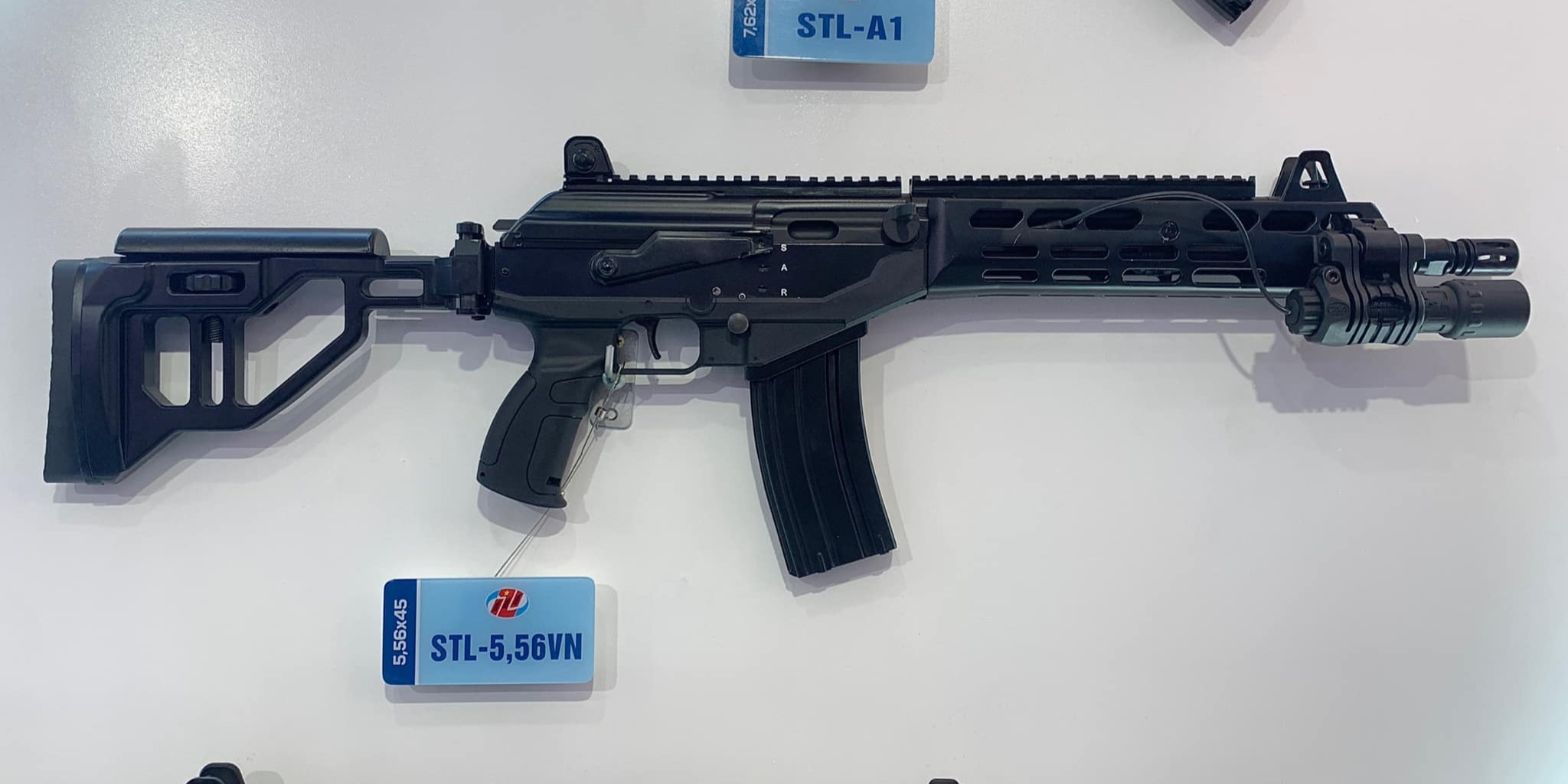
The Vietnamese STL-5,56VN.

Multiple assault rifle designs based on the Galil ACE were developed, based on technology transfers and licensed production rights:

Variant	Description	References
GK1	Testing configurations and technology demonstrators based on the Galil ACE with influences from the Kalashnikov rifles and AR-15–style rifles. Did not enter mainline service.	
GK3	Testing configurations and technology demonstrators based on the Galil ACE with influences from the Kalashnikov rifles and AR-15–style rifles. Did not enter mainline service.	
STL-5,56VN	A resemblance of the IWI US Galil Ace Gen II. Chambered in 5.56×45mm NATO, it features a M-LOK handguard, AK-style charging handle just like the STVs, and an adjustable folding stock similar to the Orsis T-5000's one.	
SHMT-M1	Amphibious rifle utilizing the ACE design platform and chambered in 5.56×45mm NATO.	

== Users ==
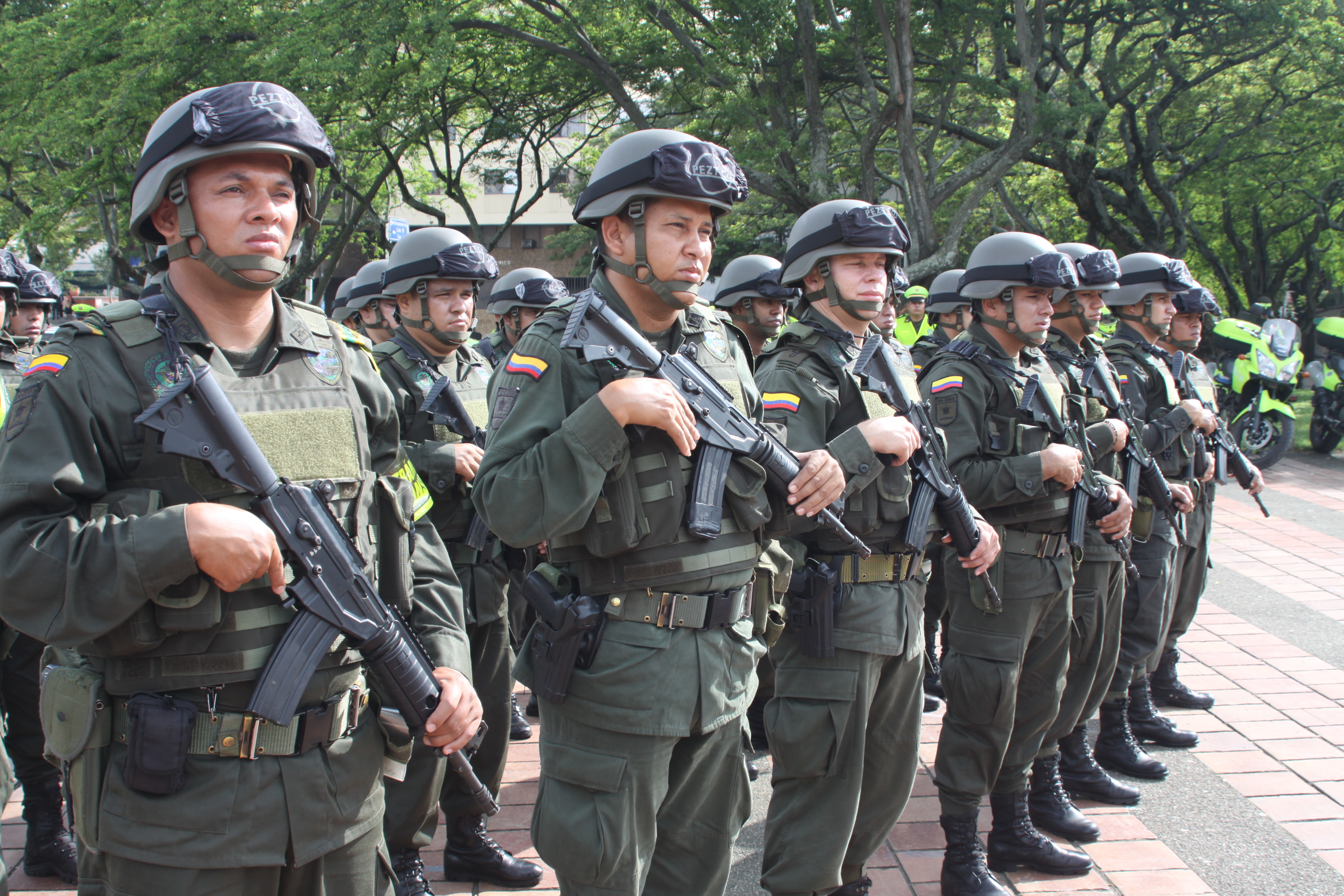
The Colombian Police armed with a Galil ACE 22

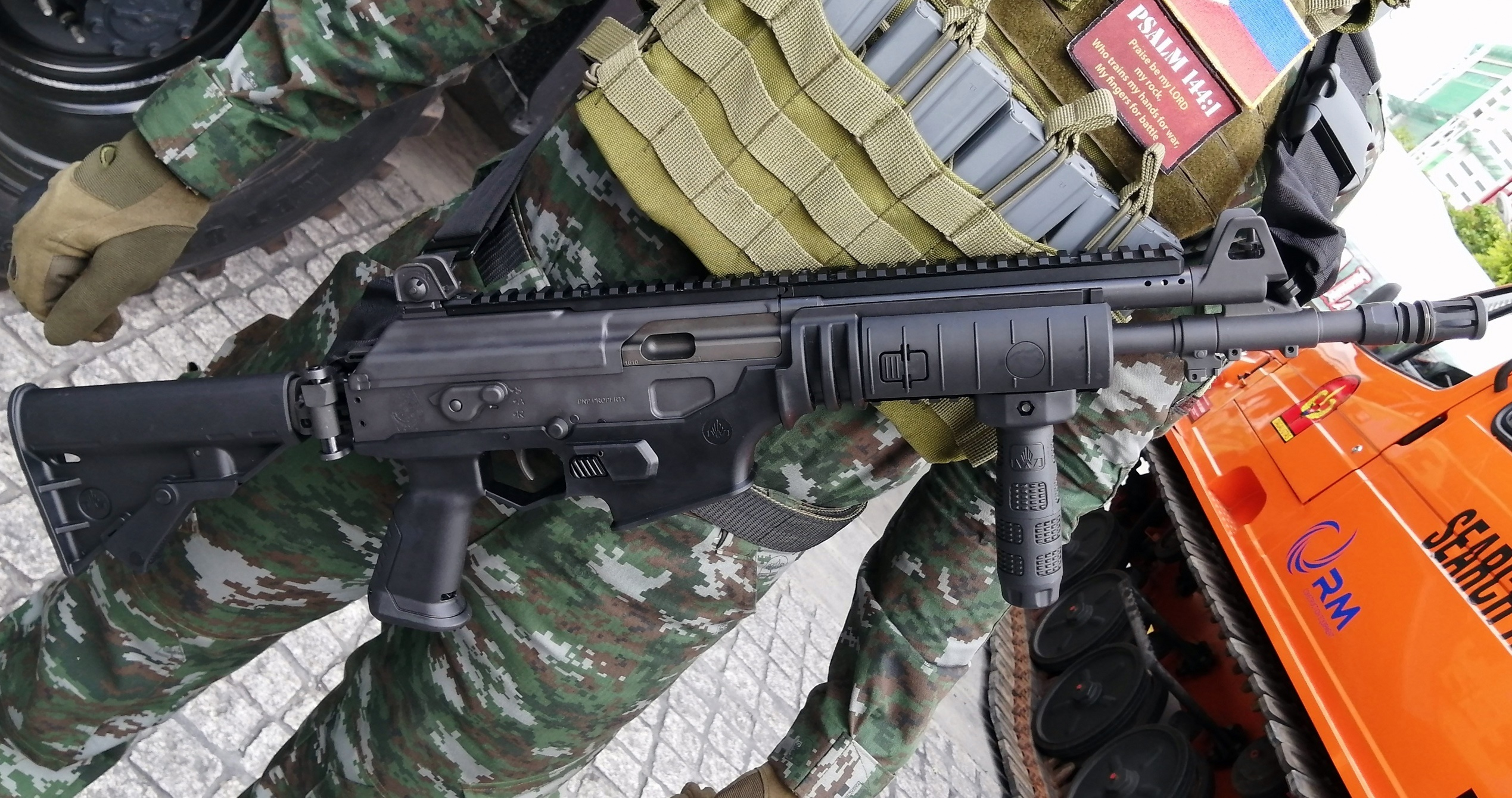
A member of the Philippine National Police's SAF with a Galil ACE-N 22

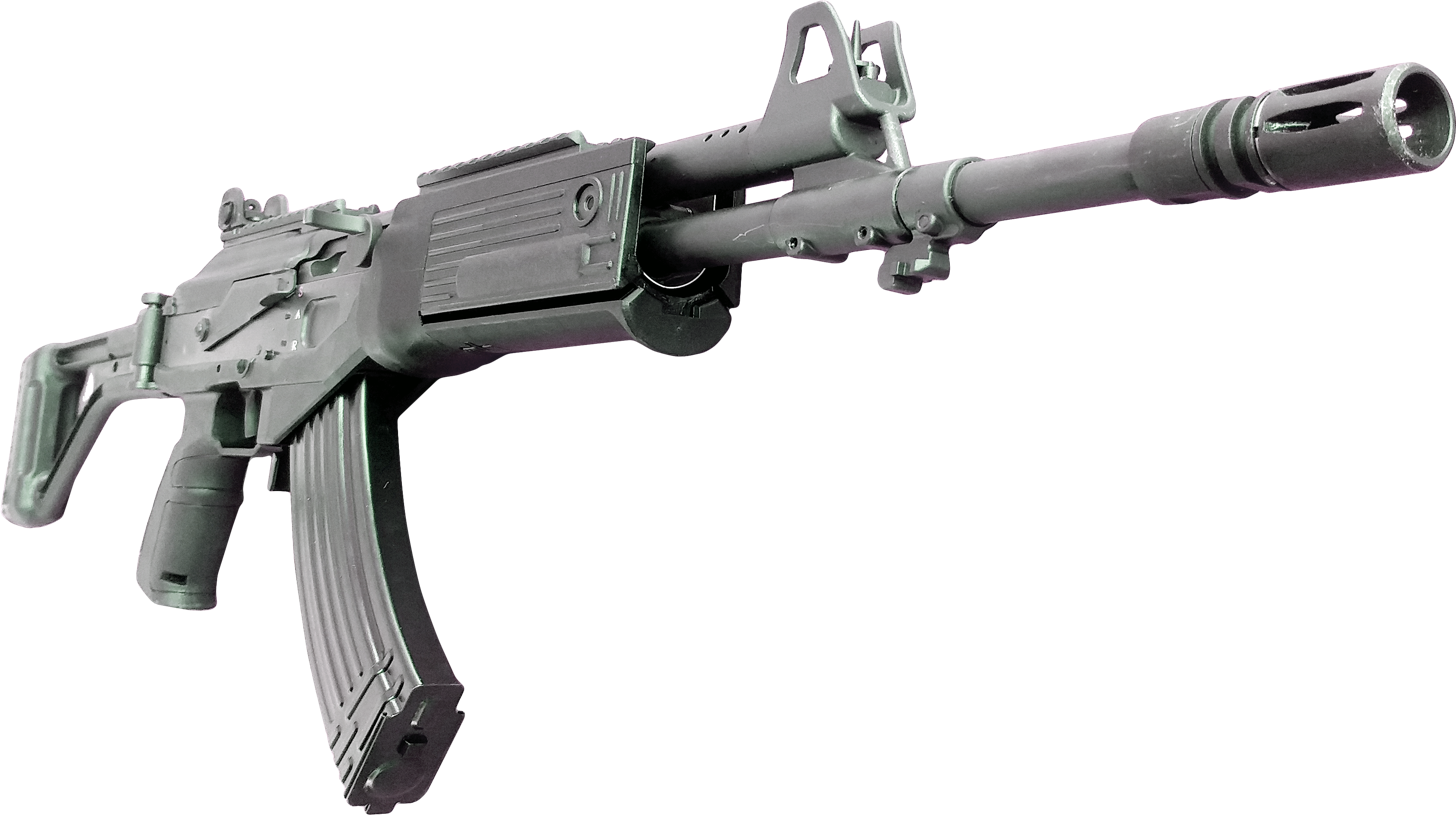
The STV-380, a Vietnamese localized equivalence to the ACE 32

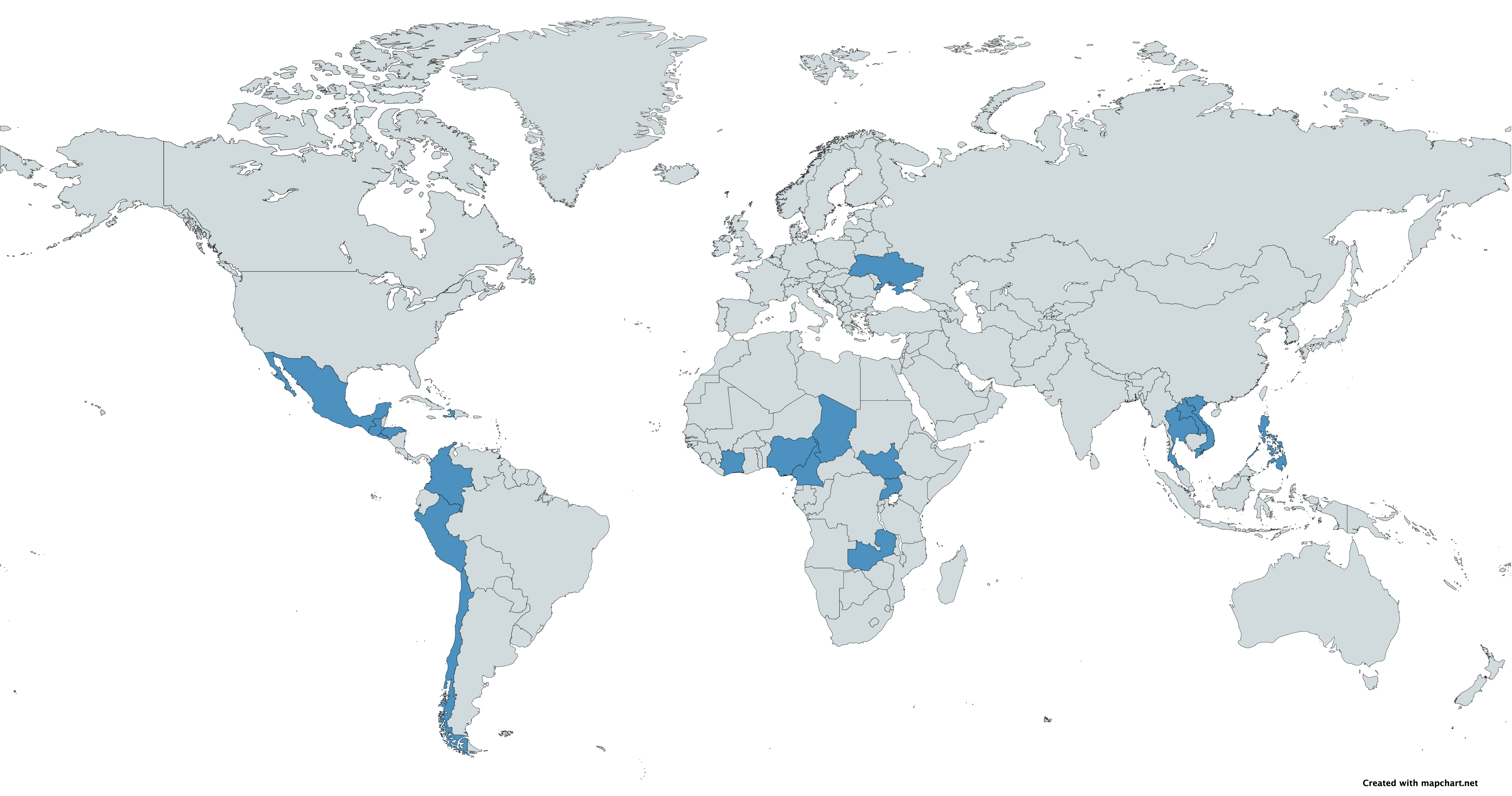
A map with IWI Galil Ace users in blue

- Cameroon: In service with Rapid Intervention Brigade.
- Chad
- Chile: Selected as the Chilean Army's new 5.56 mm standard-issue rifle. In 2014, the ACE began to be deployed in the Chilean Army.
- Colombia: Manufactured by an agreement between Indumil and IWI.
- El Salvador
- Guatemala: 3,000 ACE 31s used by the Guatemalan Police.
- Haiti: Adopted by the Haitian National Police. Seen used sparsely by Haitian Army troops.
- Honduras
- Laos: Laos received Vietnamese-made Galil ACEs in January 2019.
- India: The Indian Armed Forces have ordered 170,085 carbines from the PLR Systems, a subsidiary of Adani Defence. They will be manufactured in India under the production name Jeet.
- Ivory Coast
- Mexico: Used by the Federal Police.
- Nigeria
- Peru: The Peruvian government has plans to produce the ACE under license, establishing a factory to produce up to 2,000 rifles per month.
- Philippines: The Philippine National Police uses the ACE 22N as one of its major assault rifles as of 2018. The Philippine Drug Enforcement Agency use both the ACE-21N and ACE-22N. The Philippine Coast Guard received more than 4,000 units of ACE 21N in March 2020.
- South Sudan: Used by the South Sudanese Armed Forces. Chambered in 7.62×39mm.
- Thailand: Royal Thai Army & Royal Thai Police.
- Uganda: Galil ACE chambered in 7.62×39mm.
- Ukraine:
  - ACEs used by Ukrainian troops training in the UK under British troops.
  - Produced under license since August 2014 by RPC Fort; ACE 22: designated as the "Fort-227", ACE 31: designated as the "Fort-228", and ACE 52: designated as the "Fort-229".
- Vietnam: ACE 31: designated as the "STV-215" and ACE 32: designated as the "STV-380", the number indicating its respective barrel length, were both selected as the standard-issue service rifles in the People's Army of Vietnam (PAVN) to gradually replace their current AK-47-derived rifles.
- Zambia: Used by the Zambian Army.
