= Vietnamese submarine rescue ship Yet Kieu =

Vietnamese submarine search-and-rescue ship

- Ship 927 (orange) as seen in 2026.

History

Vietnam
- Name: Yết Kiêu
- Namesake: Yết Kiêu
- Operator: Vietnam People's Navy
- Builder: Z189 Shipyard, under Damen Group license
- Laid down: May 24, 2018
- Launched: December 6, 2019
- Commissioned: July 30, 2021
- Home port: Cam Ranh Naval Base
- Identification: VPN pennant number: 927; Call sign: VPN927; IMO: 9858151; MMSI: 574128158
- Status: Active

General characteristics
- Class & type: Damen Rescue Gear Ship 9316 (MSSARS 9316)
- Type: Multipurpose Submarine Search-And-Rescue Ship (MSSARS)
- Displacement: 3,950 tons
- Length: 94 m (308 ft 5 in)
- Beam: 16 m (52 ft 6 in)
- Draught: 4.05 m (13 ft 3 in)
- Depth: 7.20 m (23 ft 7 in)
- Installed power: Main generator sets: 2 x Caterpillar C32 810 kVA at 1800 rpm; Emergency generator sets: 1x Caterpillar C9 119 kVA at 1800 rpm; Shaft generator: 2 x 1000 kVA
- Propulsion: Main engines: 2x Caterpillar 3516C-TA (B-rating); Total power: 3840 bkW (2575 bhp) at 1600 rpm; Gearboxes: 2 x Reintjes LAF 873L, red. 7.4526:1; Propellers: 2 x CPP, 2700 mm open propellers; Bow thruster: 2 x FPP, 600 kW, electrically driven; Stern thruster: 1 x FPP, 600 kW, electrically driven
- Speed: 16 knots (30 km/h; 18 mph)
- Endurance: 30 days
- Boats & landing craft carried: See Equipments
- Complement: 100 persons
- Aviation facilities: One helicopter landing platform compatible with 12.8-ton weight and 20.9-meter diameter rotorcraft

Vietnam People's Navy Ship 927–Yết Kiêu is a multipurpose submarine search-and-rescue ship (MSSARS) of the Vietnam People's Navy. The ship is stationed at the Vietnamese Cam Ranh Naval Base, and it is purposed to support the operation of VPN's fleet of six Kilo-class diesel-electric attack submarines which were formally acquired in 2009 and firstly commissioned in early 2014.

== Launching and design ==
Designated as MSSARS 9316, the concept of Yết Kiêu was first revealed in early 2018 during the Vietship 2018 Exhibition in Hanoi and confirmed to be built by the state-owned Z189 Shipyard, using the design, technology and accessories supplied by Damen Group. MSSARS 9316 design was confirmed as slightly bigger than its sister ships, MV Stoker and MV Besant, which were also designed by Damen and built by Z189 for the Australian DMS Maritime, when Yết Kiêu has slightly bigger length (94 to 93 m, 308 to 305 ft), and it also has a slightly higher displacement and deck area.

A keel-laying ceremony for MSSARS 9316 was held in Z189 Shipyard in the city of Haiphong on May 24, 2018. The 94 m (308 ft 5 in) long and 16 m (52 ft 6 in) wide vessel, will have a displacement of 3,950 tons and feature a helipad as well as "robust dynamic positioning system and various other features" to make sure the ship can function unhindered in harsh weather conditions, such 9–12 force winds and waves as high as 14 m, according to a report by Vietnamnews.

Aside from its main role as a submarine rescue vessel, MSSARS 9316 will also be capable of conducting underwater surveying, seafloor mapping, and will serve as an ocean research vessel, said the report, adding that the construction of the ship is expected to take 27 months. However, it took only 17 months to build the ship, and it was introduced by the first time to the public in December 2019, marking the first time Vietnam owns a vessel which is dedicated for submarine rescue mission.

== Commission and operation ==
Initially, Yết Kiêu was expected to be fully operational before the scheduled Vietnamese-hosted International Maritime Review at Nha Trang in May 2020. As requested by naval chief Vice Admiral Phạm Hoài Nam, it will participate in IMR 2020 with the rest of the Vietnam People's Navy fleet alongside visiting ships from the ASEAN countries and other nations. However, due to the impact of the COVID-19 pandemic, the event was never held and the commission of the ship was also silently delayed.

In June 2021, the submarine rescue vehicle (SRV) for the ship was first time revealed, hinting that the vessel is now closer to its commission.

On July 30, 2021, at the Z189 Shipyard, the ship was formally commissioned into the Vietnam People's Navy.

In August 2021, a Kamov Ka-32T utility helicopter of the 954th Brigade, Vietnam Naval Air Force landed on the ship's helipad for the very first time as a part of the acceptance progress. After the progress, the helipad and other equipment of the ship were confirmed meeting the technical requirements of the Navy and the manufacturers, being the basis for the training and implementing the missions of the ships in the near future.

== Equipment ==
Yết Kiêu is featured with a number of a number of high-tech equipment and vehicles to support its designated mission of searching and rescuing submersible vehicles:

Name of equipment	Role	Supplier	Quantity	Description
FET 10-meter Submarine Rescue Vehicle	Deep-submergence rescue vehicle	Forum Energy Technologies United Kingdom	1	Developed to be capable of rescuing up to 17 people at a time (alongside 3 crews) and operating at depths of up to 600 meters. This 10- by 3.2-meter SRV can attach itself to submarines at highly precarious angles above 40 degrees and can detect distressed submarines more quickly compared to similar vessels, thanks to a suite of advanced sensors including a doppler velocity log, a fiber-optic gyroscope, a sonar, and depth-sensing equipment.
Perry XLX-C Remotely Operated Vehicle	Remotely operated underwater vehicle	Forum Energy Technologies United Kingdom	1	A "robot" equipped with lights, camera, bathometer, sonar...and other equipment to support the rescuing operation of the parent vessel and to transfer supplies to the affected submarines. Operable with a depth of up to 4000m with a payload of 200 kg.
Small-size speed boat	Speed boat	Damen Group Netherlands (potentially built by Z189 Shipyard of Vietnam)	2	Helps crews to be able to approach targets easily with considerable speed and high mobility.

== See also ==
- MV Besant
- MV Stoker
- Trần Đại Nghĩa (HQ-888)
- Đinh Tiên Hoàng (HQ-011)
- Lý Thái Tổ (HQ-012)
- Hà Nội (HQ-182)
- Hồ Chí Minh City (HQ-183)
- Hải Phòng (HQ-184)
- Khánh Hòa (HQ-185)
- Đà Nẵng (HQ-186)
- Bà Rịa - Vũng Tàu (HQ-187)
