= Submarine force, Vietnam People's Navy =

Submarine warfare branch of the Vietnam People's Navy

Submarine force
- Ensign of the Vietnam People's Navy
- Founded: 1996/2013
- Country: Vietnam
- Branch: Vietnam People's Navy
- Type: Armed services
- Role: Submarine warfare
- Headquarters: Cam Ranh Bay, Khánh Hòa Province, Vietnam
- Fleet: 6+ submarines

Commanders
- Brigadier: Lieutenant Colonel Nguyễn Văn Bách
- Brigade Political Commissar: Lieutenant Colonel Nguyễn Văn Quán

Insignia
- Identification symbol

The Submarine Force is a component and virtual combat arms of the Vietnam People's Navy which deals with submarine warfare.

The force is made up of 6 Russian made Kilo-class submarines, unknown numbers of North Korean made Yugo-class midget submarine and it's domestic counterpart TN-75.

Currently, the force consists of the 196th Submarine-Commando Brigade and the 189th Submarine Brigade.

== History ==
In 1996, the highly-classified 196th Brigade was established by the Vietnam People's Navy to operate the Yugo-class submarines. Its operations are allegedly associated with the Naval Commando, Vietnam People's Navy.

In 2009, the VPN ordered 6 Kilo-class submarine submarines from Russia. The total value of the contract was 4.3 billion USD. The contract also includes the training of Vietnamese sailors and the construction of a class-1 standard submarine crew training center at Cam Ranh Bay.

On 29 May 2013, the VPN officially established the submarine force and the creation of the 189th Submarine Brigade at Cam Ranh Bay.

== Boats ==
Class	Image	Type	Boats	Origin	Quantity	Status	Notes
Kilo		Diesel-electric attack submarine	Hà Nội (HQ-182) Thành phố Hồ Chí Minh (HQ-183) Hải Phòng (HQ-184) Khánh Hoà (HQ-185) Đà Nẵng (HQ-186) Bà Rịa-Vũng Tàu (HQ-187)	Russia	6	Active	Equipped with 3M-54 Kalibr missiles.
Yugo		Midget submarine		North Korea		Active	
TN-75		Midget submarine		Vietnam		Active	Design by the Naval Technical Institute.
