= Russian submarine Alrosa =

Attack submarine

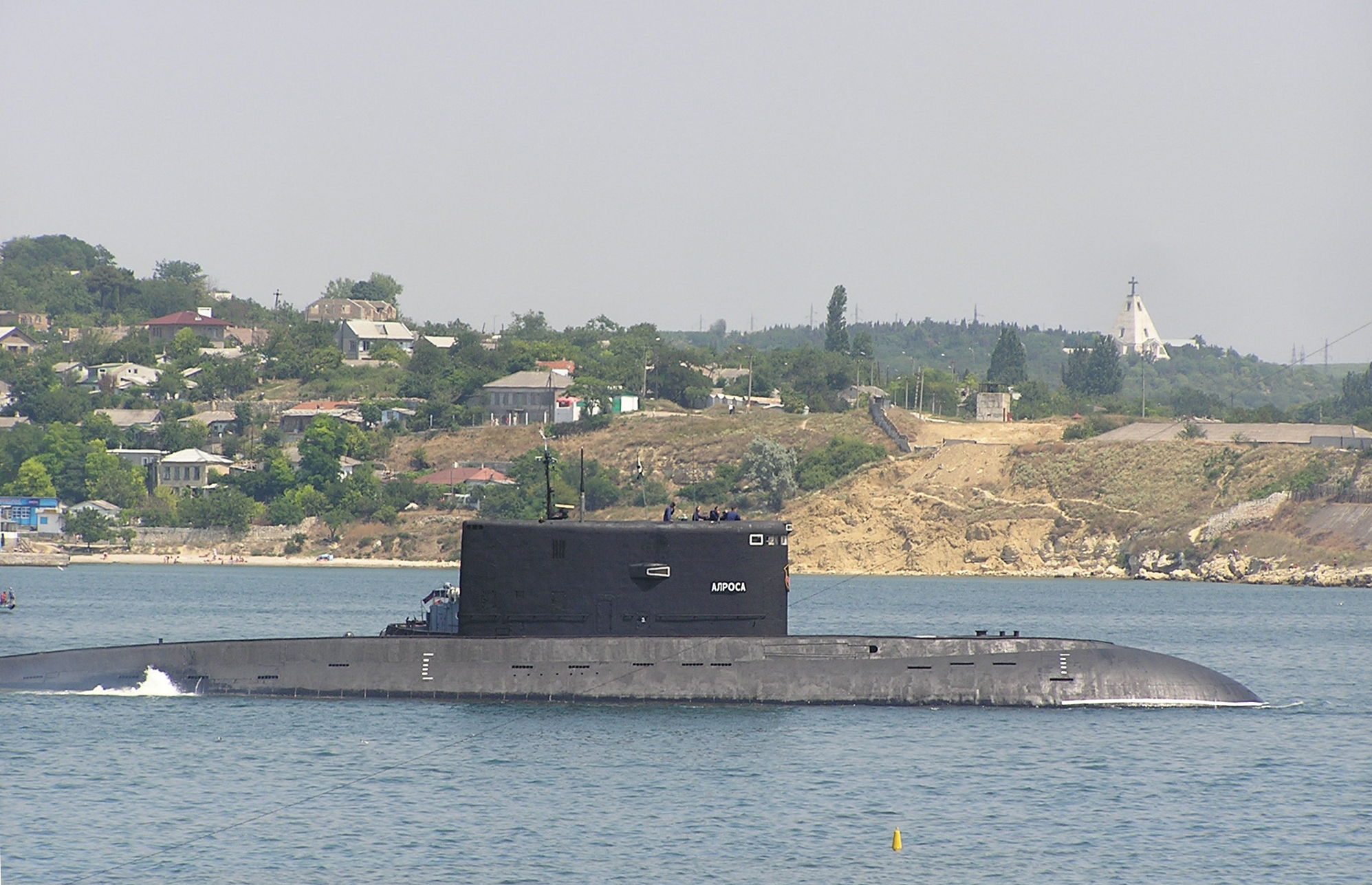
- B-871 Alrosa in Sevastopol in 2006

History

Russia
- Name: B-871 Alrosa
- Laid down: 1988
- Launched: 1989
- Commissioned: 1990
- Status: Active

General characteristics
- Class & type: Kilo-class submarine
- Displacement: Surfaced: 2,300 tons; Submerged: 3,040 tons full load
- Length: 76.2 m (250 ft 0 in)
- Draught: 6.5 m (21 ft 4 in)
- Propulsion: Diesel-electric propulsion; 2 × 1,000 kW (1,300 hp) diesel generators; 1 × 5,500–6,800 shp (4,100–5,100 kW) propulsion motor
- Speed: Surfaced: 10–12 knots (19–22 km/h; 12–14 mph); Submerged: 17–25 knots (31–46 km/h; 20–29 mph)
- Endurance: 45 days
- Test depth: 300 m (980 ft)
- Complement: 52
- Armament: 6 × 553 mm (21.8 in) torpedo tubes; 18 torpedoes; 24 mines; 8 SA-N-8 Gremlin or 8 SA-N-10 Gimlet surface-to-air missiles; Kalibr / Club land-attack cruise missile, anti-ship missile and anti-submarine missile

The Russian submarine B-871 Alrosa is a diesel-electric Kilo-class submarine that joined the Soviet Navy in 1990 and was active with the Russian Navy's Black Sea Fleet. B-871 Alrosa was laid down on 17 May 1988 at the Gorky shipyard. The submarine was launched on 10 September 1989 and commissioned on 1 December 1990. In 1991, during the dissolution of the Soviet Union, the crew of the boat swore allegiance to Ukraine. Though in Ukrainian service, the submarine saw limited duty due to a lack of parts. The vessel returned to Russian service in 1997 as part of an agreement between the two nations.

== Design and description ==
Instead of a propeller, Alrosa uses a pump jet propulsion system. As of 2022, it is unclear if this is still used or if the submarine has been converted to use a more conventional propulsion system.

== Construction and career ==
=== Construction and Soviet service ===
The boat was laid down on 17 May 1988 at the shipyard in Gorky, Russia, with the yard number 607. The boat was of the 877V design, which included a water jet nozzle rather than a propeller. The boat crew formed under the command of Captain 3rd Rank A. Yu Romanov on 18 May 1989. The submarine was launched on 10 September 1989. It sailed through the Volga and Don waterways and across the Black Sea to Sevastopol in November 1989 and on 1 December 1990, the naval ensign was raised. On 30 December 1990, B-871 became part of the 153rd Red Banner Submarine Brigade of the 14th Submarine Division of the Black Sea Fleet based at the South Bay (Sevastopol).

=== Ukrainian service ===
The boat was on patrol from December 1991 to March 1992. On 13 March 1992 the boats' crew swore allegiance to Ukraine and captured the boat. From 1992 to 1996, B-871 was limited to dockside duty, as the Ukrainian Navy was short of parts and storage batteries. In 1995 the submarine joined the 155th Submarine Brigade. On 22 May 1996 after installing batteries, the boat joined the permanent readiness forces. In August and September 1996, B-871 performed patrol tasks with a rating of "excellent" and participated in the celebration of Navy Day in Novorossiysk on return from deployment.

=== Russian service and later career ===
The boat became part of the Russian Navy under the Partition Treaty on the Status and Conditions of the Black Sea Fleet of 1997. On 19 September 1997, at the initiative of the Russian diamond mining company Alrosa and a number of Navy veterans, an agreement was signed for patronage of the boat by Alrosa. The sponsorship both upholds the Russian Navy and provides youths from Yakutia (where diamond mines are located) a military alternative to crime, drugs and alcoholism. From August 1998 to April 1999 the vessel underwent repairs at the Sevastopol Shipyard. In January 2004, it was given the name Alrosa. This makes it "the world's only combat submarine named after a company".

In August 2008 it took part in the battle off the coast of Abkhazia. On 5 August 2009, the submarine conducted depth tests after dock repairs, submerging to the working depth – up to 240 metres (790 ft).

Its propulsion system broke down while it was training in the Black Sea off the coast of Abkhazia on 21 November 2009. Unable to make it back to Sevastopol, Alrosa was towed to the Novorossiysk naval base on 23 November. After major repairs there, it started sea trials in July 2010, after which it was intended to return to Sevastopol.

Alrosa and three Russian support vessels participated in the Bold Monarch international exercise for submarine rescue forces held off the coast of Spain from 30 May to 10 June 2011, the first Russian submarine to take part in a NATO submarine rescue exercise. In July, the boat made the transition to the Baltic Sea for scheduled maintenance in Kronstadt. In September 2012, she returned to Sevastopol after the maintenance, the transition from the Baltic to the Black Sea taking little more than a month.

On 12 May 2013, Alrosa, together with the Ukrainian submarine Zaporizhzhia, were present at the celebration of the 230th anniversary of the Black Sea Fleet in Sevastopol. After the Russian annexation of Crimea in 2014, the Alrosa crew serviced the captured Zaporizhzhia, until then, the only Ukrainian submarine and Alrosa also served to train half of its formerly Ukrainian crew, who had chosen to join the Russian Navy.

In 2018, it was reported that the submarine would be transferred to the Baltic Fleet. The transfer had not occurred as of 2020, though the matter was reported as still under consideration in 2021, when the submarine was undergoing maintenance. It underwent a major overhaul and modernization, enabling it to carry Kalibr-PL cruise missiles. Reportedly, she was also being used as a pump-jet propulsor test platform. After passing post-repair tests, she was introduced into the Black Sea Fleet submarine brigade based in Sevastopol in June 2022, with the transfer to the Baltic Fleet cancelled. It is the only original Kilo-class boat (Project 877) remaining with the Black Sea Fleet, with all other traditional Kilo submarines in the fleet having been replaced by the more modern "Improved Kilo" (Project 636.3) variant.
