= Russian submarine Chita =

Russian diesel-electric submarine

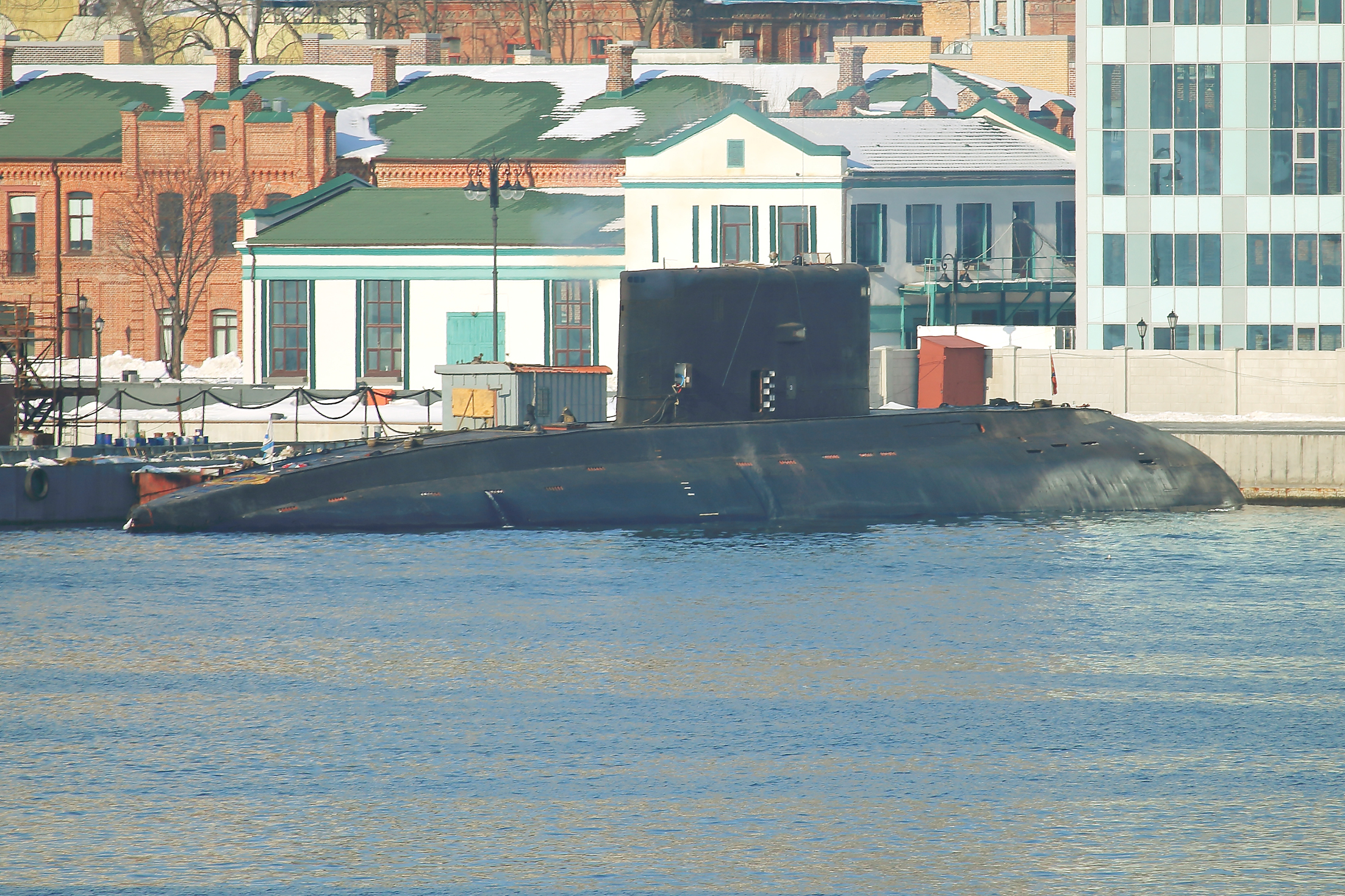

History

Russia
- Name: B-260 Chita
- Namesake: Chita, Zabaykalsky Krai
- Laid down: 22 February 1981
- Launched: 23 August 1981
- Commissioned: 30 December 1981
- Decommissioned: 2013
- Fate: Sank while being towed for dismantling on 12 December 2019

General characteristics
- Class & type: Kilo-class submarine
- Displacement: Surfaced: 2,300 tons; Submerged: 3,950 tons
- Length: 73 m (239 ft 6 in)
- Propulsion: Diesel-electric propulsion
- Speed: Surfaced: 17 knots (31 km/h; 20 mph); Submerged: 20 knots (37 km/h; 23 mph)
- Endurance: 45 days
- Complement: 52
- Armament: 6 × 553 mm (21.8 in) torpedo tubes; 18 torpedoes; 24 mines; 8 SA-N-8 Gremlin or 8 SA-N-10 Gimlet surface-to-air missiles; Kalibr / Club land-attack cruise missile, anti-ship missile and anti-submarine missile

B-260 Chita was a Project 877 Kilo-class submarine of the Russian Navy in service from 1981 to 2013, which sank in 2019 while being towed for dismantling.

== Description ==
Chita was a diesel-electric submarine with a surfaced displacement of 2,300 tons and submerged displacement of 3,950 tons. It had a length of 73 metres (239 ft 6 in), a beam of 10 metres (32 ft 10 in), and a draft of 6.2 metres (20 ft 4 in). Its test depth was 350 metres (1,150 ft), it had a maximum speed of 20 knots (37 km/h; 23 mph), and it could operate at sea for up to 45 days at a time. It had a crew of 52 and operated six 21.8-inch (550 mm) torpedo tubes.

== History ==
Construction began on the submarine on 22 February 1981, when it was laid down at Leninsky Komsomol Shipyard in Komsomolsk-on-Amur as B-260. It was launched on 23 August and was commissioned on 30 December. It did not receive the name Chita until 19 March 2006, when it was sponsored by the city administration of Chita. While in service, Chita was assigned to the Pacific Fleet, and the ship was decommissioned and laid up in 2013.

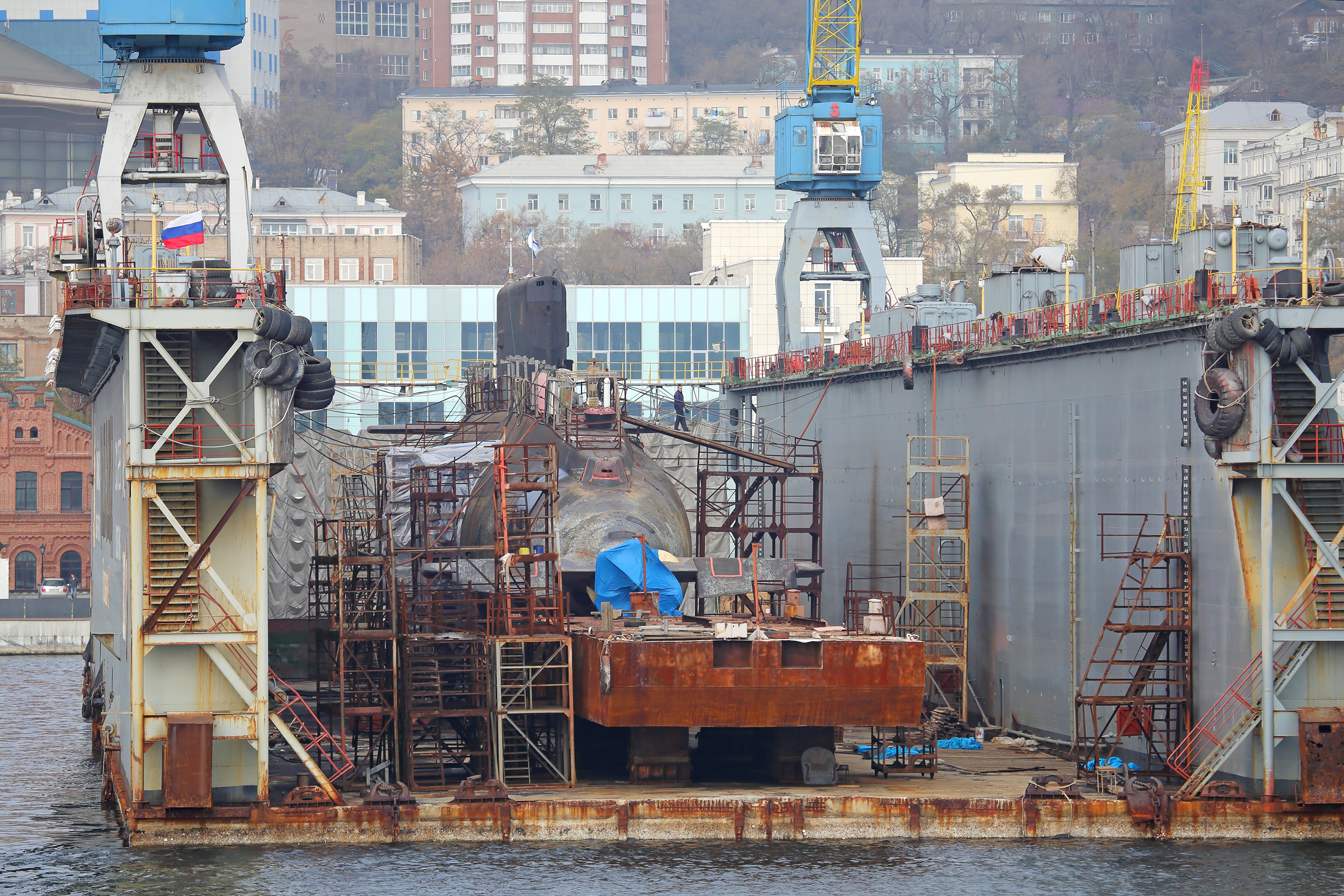
Chita laid up in Dalzavod Dockyard in 2014

In November 2019, Chita was handed over to the company JSC MPZ Askona to be broken up and dismantled. On 11 December, the submarine was being towed by the tug Lazurit from Vladivostok to the dismantling yard in Nakhodka while in poor weather conditions. During the transit, while in the Sea of Japan, the stern of the submarine sank and rested on the seafloor. The tug disconnected and anchored nearby, and since Chita was unmanned and carried no fuel, there were no casualties in the incident. It was stated that the submarine was to be refloated in order to continue to the dismantling yard.
