= ORP Orzeł =

Three boats of the Polish Navy have been named ORP Orzeł (meaning eagle in Polish):

- ORP Orzeł (1938) was an Orzeł-class submarine commissioned in 1939 and lost in 1940
- ORP Orzeł (1962) was a Whiskey-class submarine commissioned in 1962 and decommissioned in 1983
- ORP Orzeł (1986) is a Kilo-class submarine commissioned by the Polish Navy in 1986 and currently in service with the 3rd Flotilla
