= Z189 Shipyard =

Vietnamese state-owned shipyard

189 Co., Ltd
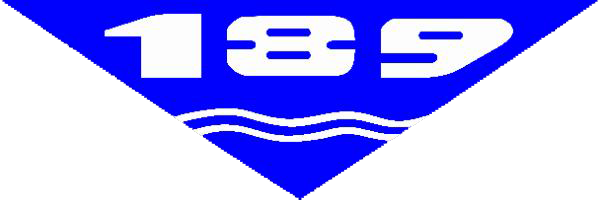
- Trade name: 189 Shipbuilding Company; Z189 Shipyard/Factory
- Native name: Công ty TNHH MTV 189; Công ty Đóng tàu 189; Nhà máy Z189
- Type: State-owned enterprise
- Industry: Arms industry Shipbuilding; Precison mechanic
- Predecessor: 10B Engineering Company
- Founded: January 17, 1989; 37 years ago in Haiphong, Vietnam
- Headquarters: Hải An District, Haiphong, Vietnam
- Area served: Vietnam
- Production output: Patrol boat; Hospital ship; Auxiliary ship; Submarine rescue ship; Bulk carrier; Catamaran; Yacht
- Owner: Vietnamese Ministry of National Defence
- Website: dongtau189.com

The 189 One Member LLC (Vietnamese: Công ty TNHH Một thành viên 189), trading as the 189 Shipbuilding Company (Vietnamese: Công ty đóng tàu 189), also operating under its military designation Z189 Shipyard or Z189 Factory (Vietnamese: Nhà máy Z189), is a state-owned shipyard in Vietnam, operated by the Ministry of Defense.

The shipyard was established in 1989 in Hải An District, Haiphong.

== History ==
Prior to January 1989, Z189 was known as the Xưởng 10B (10B Engineering Company), and was part of the 3rd Military Region.

At the end of 2003, in accordance with mission requirements, the Ministry of National Defense issued a decision to transfer Company 189 from Military Region 3 Command to the General Department of Defence Industry. In April 2006, the company was restructured from an economic enterprise into a defense and security enterprise, and was officially designated with the military code name Z189 Factory.

In response to development demands in the new period, in 2005, the company received attention and investment from the Standing Committee of the Central Military Commission, the Ministry of National Defense, the Party Committee Standing Board, and the leadership of the General Department of Defense Industry to implement Phase I of the construction of a new shipbuilding and repair factory in Dong Hai 2 Ward (Hai An District, Hai Phong City), covering an area of 35.4 hectares.

Z189 Factory has focused on enhancing the quality of scientific and technological research, defense production, economic development, and promoting exports. The factory has successfully fulfilled its research and production tasks, including the domestic construction— for the first time—of numerous types of modern military vessels featuring high technical complexity, advanced weapons and equipment systems, and long-endurance capabilities at sea. These vessels serve strategic and operational-level transport forces, as well as provide equipment and weaponry for maritime militia forces and military units throughout the armed forces.

In addition, the factory has undertaken repairs for hundreds of military vessels, while also focusing on diversifying its development of strategic, high-tech weapons and military equipment to support national defense and key security projects. It has actively participated in the research and production of various military vehicles and high-precision mechanical products.

Besides its national defense manufacturing duties, the factory has also built and exported numerous series of high-value specialized ships and boats—such as submarine rescue vessels, aviation training ships, and crew supply ships—to more than 40 countries worldwide.

== Ships built ==
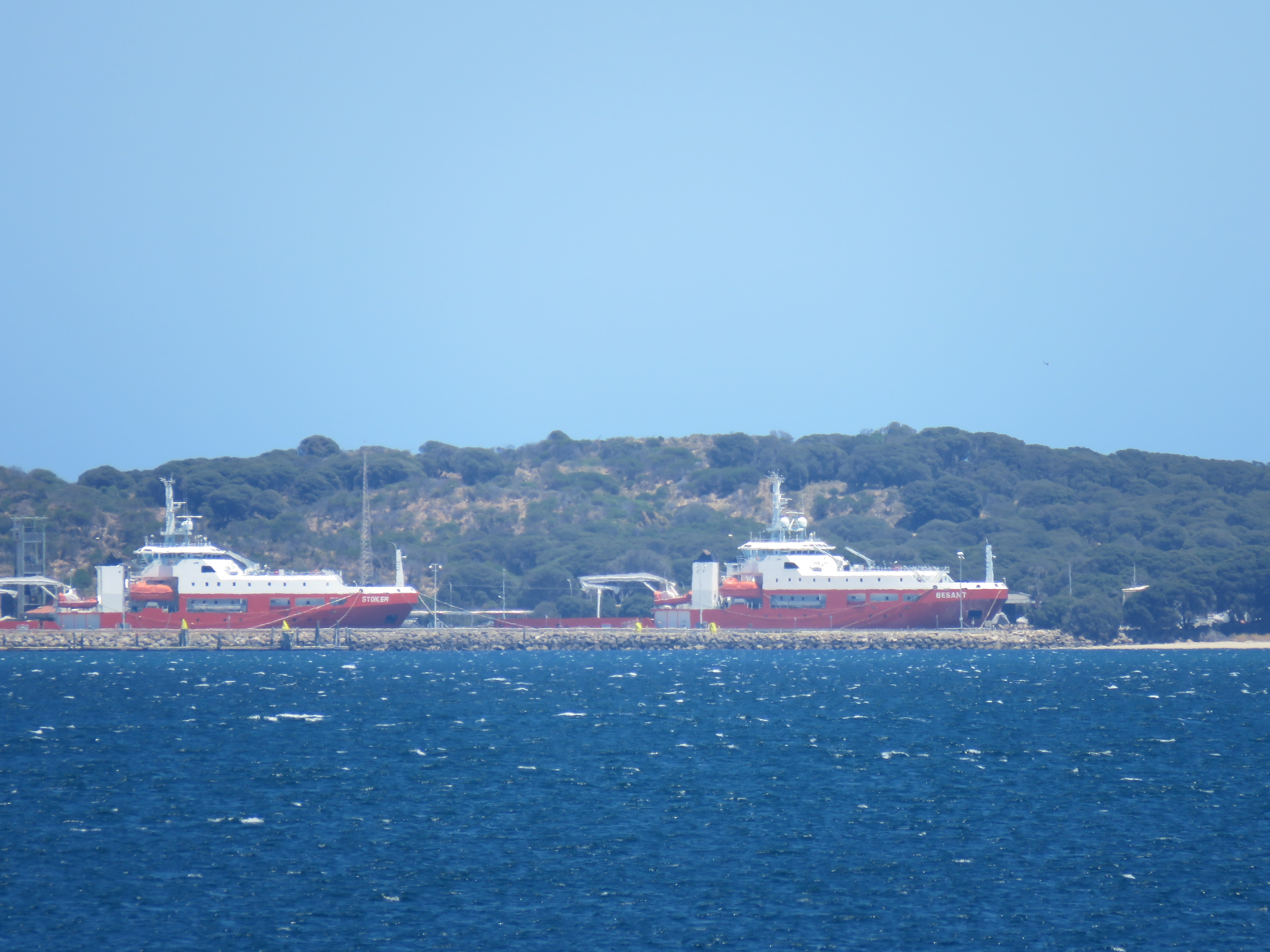
MV Stoker and her sister, MV Besant, at Garden Island in December 2020

- Damen Rescue Gear Ship 9316- a submarine rescue ship class
  - Yết Kiêu (HQ-927)
  - MV Stoker
  - MV Besant
- HQ-571 transports/logistics ship
- Vietnam Coast Guard DN2000 offshore patrol vessel class
  - CSB-8001
  - CSB-8004
- HQ-561 hospital ship
- SAR-631 search and rescue ship
