= ORP Orzeł (1986) =

Polish Navy submarine

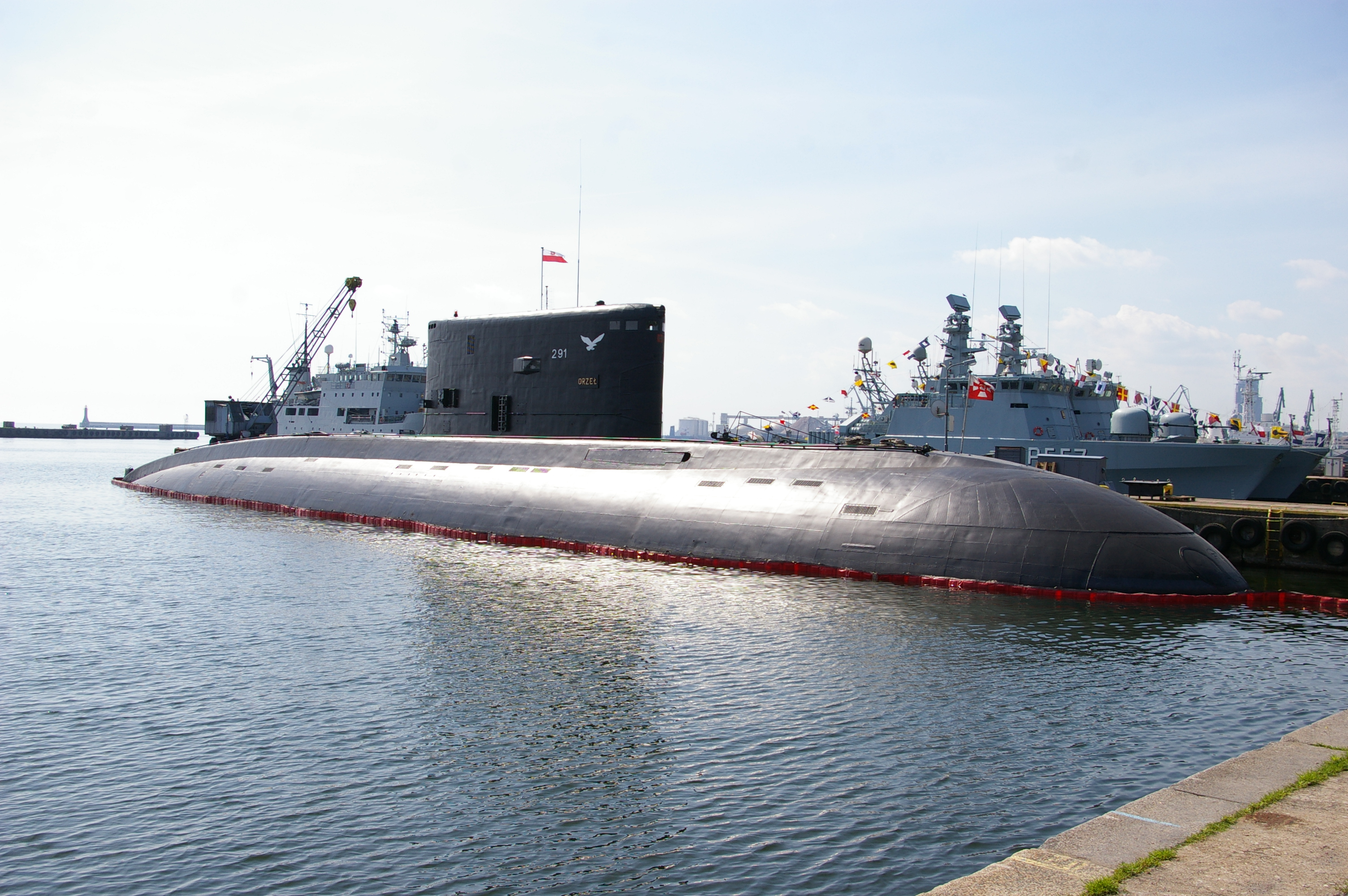
- Orzeł in 2010

History

Poland
- Name: ORP Orzeł
- Commissioned: 29 April 1986
- Home port: Gdynia
- Identification: 291
- Status: In service
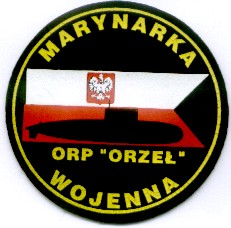
- Badge

General characteristics
- Class & type: Kilo-class submarine
- Displacement: 2,460 t surfaced; 3,180 t submerged
- Length: 72.6 m (238 ft 2 in)
- Beam: 12.8 m (42 ft 0 in)
- Draught: 14.5 m (47 ft 7 in)
- Speed: 12 knots (22 km/h; 14 mph) surfaced; 17 knots (31 km/h; 20 mph) submerged
- Complement: 60
- Armament: 6 × 533 mm (21.0 in) torpedo tubes for guided electric TEST-71 torpedoes, guided 53-65K oxygen-propelled torpedoes; 24 naval mines

ORP Orzeł (291) is a Polish Navy 'Project 877E Paltus (Russian: Па́лтус, meaning "halibut")' (in NATO code Kilo-class) submarine. She is the third Polish submarine to bear the name Orzeł (Eagle).

The boat was built by the Shipyard Krasnoe Sormovo in Gorky and was commissioned on 29 April 1986 at Riga. On 13 June of the same year Orzeł was transferred to Gdynia where she was named on 21 June. The submarine was assigned to the 3rd Flotilla based in Gdynia. As of 2024, she is the oldest Kilo-class submarine in active service and the only operational submarine in the Polish Navy.

== Operational history ==
In mid 2013, minor repairs to the vessels ballast tanks took place, concluding in early 2014.

In June 2014 long term overhaul work began at the Polish Navy Shipyard in Gdynia. Work was initially planned to last nine months, but expanded significantly as the scope of renovations and repairs grew. At this point in time, it was expected that the ship would be able to continue until an expected retirement date of 2022.

In 2015, the submarine suffered damage to hull plating and mooring attachments while being removed from its floating dock in Gdynia, necessitating further repairs It was noted in late 2016 that Orzeł was still under refit. On 27 September 2017, a fault in a distribution box and insulation of wires connecting the generator to the ships batteries resulted in a fire while docked in Gdynia. As a result, the interior of the ship sustained minor damage due to the fire as well as firefighting team. The incident was reportedly not acknowledged by Ministry of National Defence until highlighted by Polish media. The overhaul was further complicated by dire financial state of the Polish Navy Shipyard. This was somewhat resolved after the shipyard was taken over by PGZ. As a result, Orzeł would return to the shipyard for further repairs, returning to service in 2018.

In May 2020, repairs to the vessels MGK-400E Rubikon hydroacoustic complex was announced.

In April 2021 it was reported that none of the vessels six torpedo tubes were functional, due to deformed tubes and a malfunctioning MWU-110EM Munera-E control system. In May, Polish sources claimed that an anonymous letter had been published by submariners of the Polish Navy, citing grave safety concerns regarding the submarine fleet. The veracity of the letter was denied by the Armed Forces General Command. However, they did admit that prior to overhaul, Orzeł had been unable to dive for up to three years.

From 2017 to 2021, the Kobben-class submarines in Polish service were withdrawn from service, leaving Orzeł as the only submarine in Polish use. By 2021, Orzeł had accumulated a distance of 97,0000 nautical miles and 800 dives throughout the vessels service.

In November 2021 Orzeł was withdrawn from operational service and entered overhaul at the Polish Navy Shipyard, leaving the Polish Navy without a single operational submarine. The vessel was reported to need repairs to its hull, high pressure cylinders, ballast system and fuel tanks, steering and hydraulics and exhaust system. A contract was signed with Polska Grupa Zbrojeniowa totalling 22.5 million zlotys. The completion of overhaul work was announced in June 2023.

In January 2024, it was reported that Orzeł would return to the shipyard again to conduct repairs on the periscope and antenna mast.

In March 2024, Orzeł returned to service, after performing post refit sea trials in Gdańsk Bay. On 30 June 2024, the vessel was opened to the public in Gdynia. In 2025 Orzeł took part in exercises in the Baltic Sea. In August, the Polish Navy posted a video of a sailor dancing on the submarine. The video received mixed remarks, with some acknowledging its lightheartedness but with others criticising the Navy of promoting unprofessionalism and 'brain-rot' content. In August 2025, Orzeł, along with several other ships took part in a parade off the coast of Gdynia.

On 28 November 2025, Orzeł was expected to take part in anniversary celebrations in Świnoujście. However, it was reported that the vessel suffered a significant technical failure on 26 November 2025, having to return to its home port in Gdynia. The issue was reportedly a fault related to the ships diesel engines and had been supposedly repaired at the Polish Navy Shipyard during its refit from 2022 to 2024. As a result it returned on electric power. On the same day, it was announced that the Polish Navy would replace the single remaining submarine in the fleet with three Swedish made Blekinge-class submarines. However, the class has itself encountered significant delays with delivery not expected until 2031. As a result, the transfer of HSwMS Södermanland will be conducted as a stopgap.
