= Vietnamese submarine Ha Noi =

Vietnamese submarine

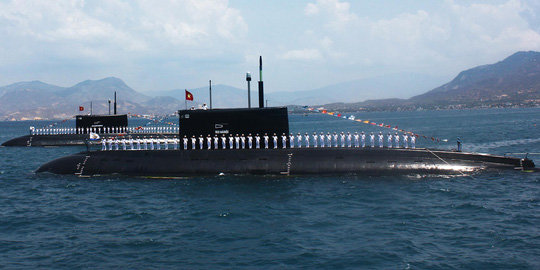
- Hà Nội in background

History

Vietnam People's Navy
- Name: Hà Nội
- Namesake: Hanoi
- Ordered: 14 December 2009
- Builder: Admiralty Shipyards
- Launched: 28 August 2012
- Commissioned: 15 January 2014
- Home port: Cam Ranh
- Identification: HQ-182
- Status: Active

General characteristics
- Class & type: Kilo-class submarine (Project 636.1)
- Type: Attack submarine
- Displacement: 2350t / 3950t
- Length: 70.0–73.8 m (229 ft 8 in – 242 ft 2 in)
- Beam: 9.9 m (32 ft 6 in)
- Draft: 6.2 m (20 ft 4 in)
- Installed power: Diesel-electric
- Propulsion: Diesel-electric propulsion; 2 × 1000 kW Diesel generators; 1 × 5,500–6,800 shp (4,100–5,100 kW) propulsion motor; 1 × fixed-pitch 7 bladed propeller
- Speed: 9-17 knots
- Endurance: 45 days
- Complement: 52
- Armament: 6 x 533 mm (21 in) torpedo tubes; 18 torpedoes; 4 Kalibr / Club land-attack cruise missile, anti-ship missile and anti-submarine missile

Vietnam People's Navy Submarine 182–Hà Nội is a Kilo-class submarine of the Vietnam People's Navy. Submarine 182-Hà Nội is a diesel-electric Kilo-class submarine of the 636 Varshavyanka type built by Russia. It is the first of six Kilo-class submarines that Vietnam ordered in 2009. The vessel is part of the 189th Submarine Brigade and is based at Cam Ranh port.

== Construction ==
During Vietnamese Prime Minister Nguyễn Tấn Dũng’s visit to Russia in December 2009, Vietnam placed an order for six 636 Varshavyanka-class (NATO designation: Kilo-class) submarines, which included crew training, equipment, and weaponry.

The submarine was laid down on 25 August 2010, at the Admiralty Shipyard in Saint Petersburg, Russia.

On 28 August 2012, the official launching ceremony took place at the Admiralty Shipyard in Saint Petersburg, northern Russia.

=== Sea trials ===
In early December 2012, the Hà Nội submarine sailed out to sea for the first time, officially beginning its factory trial phase. The vessel conducted sea trials near the port of Svetly in the Kaliningrad region.

On 13 May 2013, Prime Minister Nguyễn Tấn Dũng visited the testing site to encourage and speak with the crew, as well as to inspect the progress of the trials of this modern submarine.

By early June 2013, the submarine's trials had been completed.

== Delivery ==
On 7 November 2013, the submarine was handed over and loaded onto the Dutch heavy-lift ship Rolldock Sea on 18 November 2013, for transport to Vietnam. The journey took the submarine from the Baltic Sea to the Atlantic Ocean, around Africa via the Cape of Good Hope, into the Indian Ocean, and through the Strait of Malacca.

On 28 December 2013, the Rolldock Sea carrying the Hà Nội submarine docked at the Port of Singapore to refuel. It then departed the same day, heading directly for Vietnam.

On 3 January 2014, the Hà Nội arrived at Cam Ranh military port..
