= Romanian submarine Delfinul =

Kilo-class naval submarine

Coordinates: 44.156324°N 28.66547°E

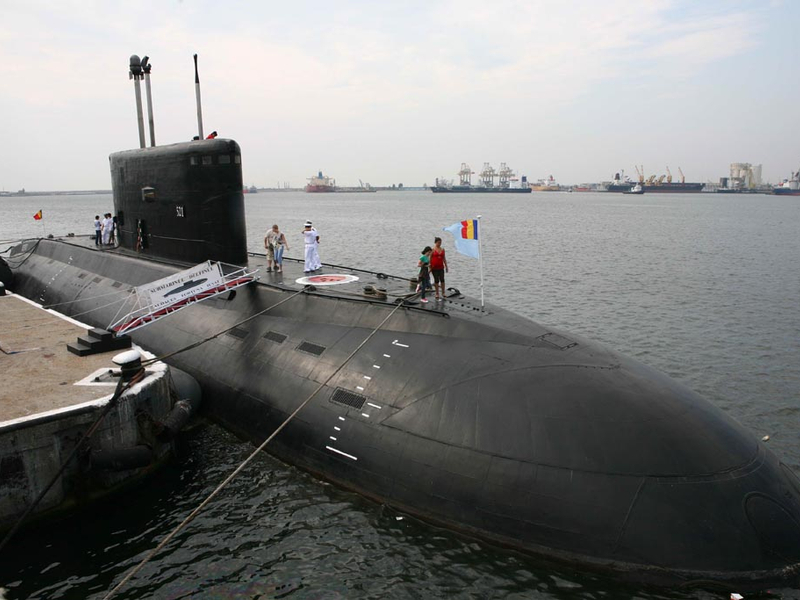
- Delfinul submarine in 2008

History

Romania
- Name: Delfinul
- Ordered: 1984
- Builder: Krasnoye Sormovo Factory No. 112
- Completed: 1985
- Commissioned: August 1985
- Out of service: 1995
- Home port: Constanța
- Status: In reserve

General characteristics
- Class & type: Kilo-class submarine
- Displacement: 2,460 t., surfaced; 3,180 t., submerged
- Length: 72.9 m (239 ft 2 in)
- Beam: 12.8 m (42 ft 0 in)
- Draft: 14.5 m (47 ft 7 in)
- Speed: 12 knots (22 km/h; 14 mph), surfaced; 20 knots (37 km/h; 23 mph), submerged
- Complement: 54
- Armament: 6 × 533 mm (21.0 in) torpedo tubes for guided electric TEST-71 torpedoes, guided 53-65K oxygen-propelled torpedoes; 28 naval mines; 8 SA-16 Gimlet surface-to-air missiles

Delfinul ('The dolphin') is a Kilo-class submarine of the Romanian Naval Forces. It was commissioned in August 1985 and is currently the only Romanian submarine in service. Due to a lack of funding the submarine has been inactive since 1995; it is kept in reserve docked in the military sector of the Port of Constanța.

== History ==
In the early 1980s, the Romanian Naval Forces expressed the need for a submarine to train the anti-submarine vessels of the fleet. The Chinese government made an offer for six Type 33 submarines, two built in China (one with Romanian workers) and four in Romania. However, the Type 33 was an obsolete design and the Romanian government decided to purchase Soviet equipment. A Kilo-class submarine was acquired in 1984 for $61.5 million from USSR. The submarine was built by Krasnoye Sormovo Factory No. 112 in Gorki. The Romanian crew of the submarine was trained in the USSR. The submarine, christened Delfinul, was delivered in 1985. Another two Kilo-class submarines were planned for purchase, but due to financial reasons, the orders were cancelled.

== Service ==
The submarine successfully accomplished 67 missions, with 2,000 hours of immersion. During these missions, Delfinul launched 23 torpedoes and 2 naval mines. In 1996, the submarine exhausted the resources of the initial batteries and is kept in reserve since then. After 2001, the submarine was transferred to the "Mircea cel Bătrân" Naval Academy, being used as a training ship. Numerous overhauling plans have been proposed since 1996, yet none were implemented.

== See also ==
- NMS Delfinul, a World War II-era namesake
