= Vietnamese submarine Ho Chi Minh City =

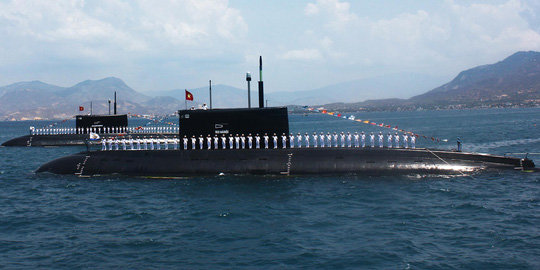

History

Vietnam People's Navy
- Name: Thành phố Hồ Chí Minh
- Namesake: Ho Chi Minh City
- Ordered: 14 December 2009
- Builder: Admiralty Shipyards
- Launched: 28 December 2012
- Commissioned: 3 April 2014
- Home port: Cam Ranh
- Identification: HQ-183
- Status: Active

General characteristics
- Class & type: Kilo-class submarine (Project 636.1)
- Type: Attack submarine
- Displacement: 2350t / 3950t
- Length: 70.0–73.8 m (229 ft 8 in – 242 ft 2 in)
- Beam: 9.9 m (32 ft 6 in)
- Draft: 6.2 m (20 ft 4 in)
- Installed power: Diesel-electric
- Propulsion: Diesel-electric propulsion; 2 × 1000 kW Diesel generators; 1 × 5,500–6,800 shp (4,100–5,100 kW) Propulsion motor; 1 × fixed-pitch 7 bladed propeller
- Speed: 9-17 knots
- Endurance: 45 days
- Complement: 52
- Armament: 6 x 533 mm (21 in) torpedo tubes; 18 torpedoes; 4 Kalibr / Club land-attack cruise missile, anti-ship missile and anti-submarine missile

Vietnam People's Navy Submarine 183–Thành phố Hồ Chí Minh (Ho Chi Minh City) is a Kilo-class submarine of the Vietnam People's Navy. She is one of six Kilo-class submarines in service with Vietnam.
