= MV Stoker =

Royal Australian Navy auxiliary ship

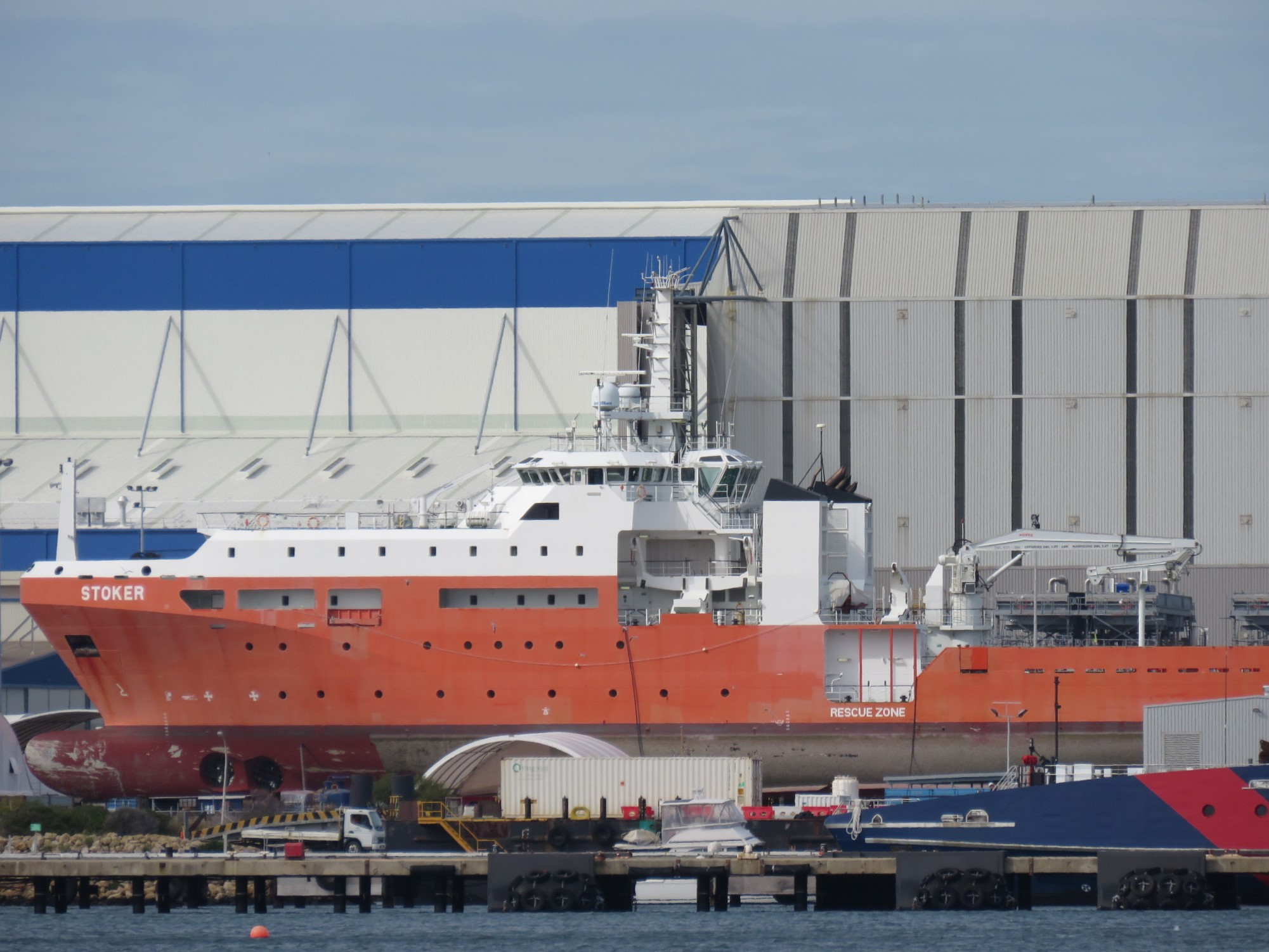
- MV Stoker at Henderson, Australia

History

Australia
- Name: Stoker
- Namesake: Lieutenant Commander Henry Stoker, DSO
- Operator: DMS Maritime
- Builder: Z189 Shipyard, Haiphong
- Launched: 21 May 2015
- Home port: Fleet Base West
- Identification: Call sign: VJN4918; IMO number: 9707998; MMSI number: 503000098
- Status: In active service

General characteristics

MV Stoker is a Royal Australian Navy (RAN) National Support Squadron merchant vessel (MV) auxiliary ship. Constructed in Vietnam, and launched in 2015, MV Stoker is meant for submarine rescue. In mid-2023, MV Stoker found the wreck of USS Edsall off the coast of Christmas Island during an unrelated mission.

== Construction and naming ==
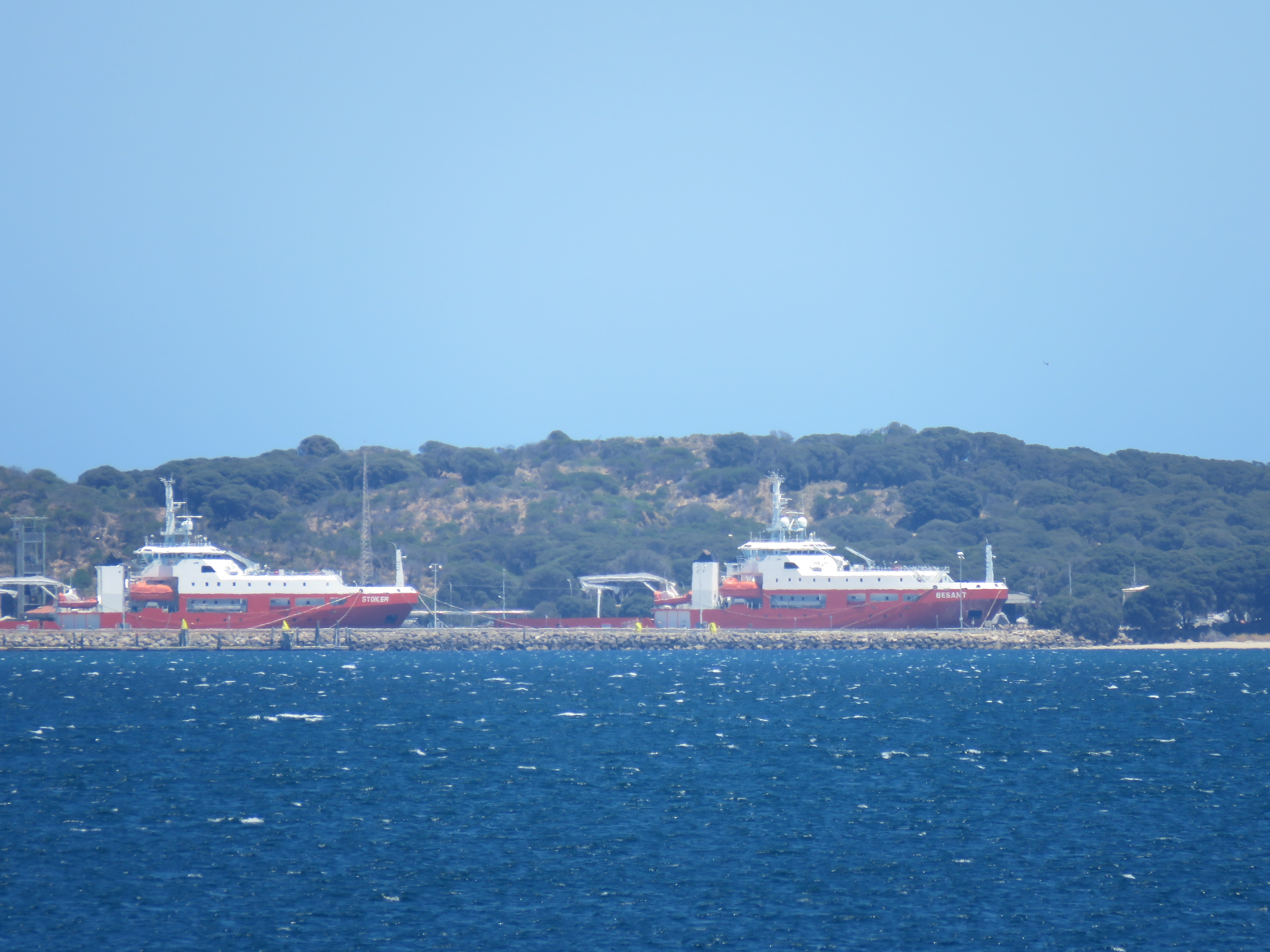
MV Stoker and her sister, MV Besant, at Garden Island in December 2020

MV Stoker was constructed by the Damen Song Cam Shipyards, located in Haiphong, Vietnam, and was launched on May 21, 2015. Stoker is named after Lieutenant Commander Henry Stoker, the commanding officer of the World War I submarine HMAS AE2. The merchant vessel was purpose built, along with her sister MV Besant, for supporting submarines and their missions. Each ship contains an LR5 submarine rescue system submersible, a decompression chamber, and enhanced on-board medical facilities. Each ship can support a full complement of a submarine crew.

== Service history ==
MV Stoker began service at some point after its launch day of May 21, 2015. It is currently still in service.

=== Discovery of USS Edsall ===
USS Edsall was a Clemson-class destroyer in service during World War II. She was sunk by a combined Japanese air and naval attack off the coast of Christmas Island, approximately 200 miles (320 km) east, on March 1, 1942, three months after the Attack on Pearl Harbor. 200 servicemen were killed in the sinking of the vessel. The exact resting place of Edsall was unknown, as she was alone in combat when she was sunk, and the only records of her fight were maintained by the Imperial Japanese Navy.

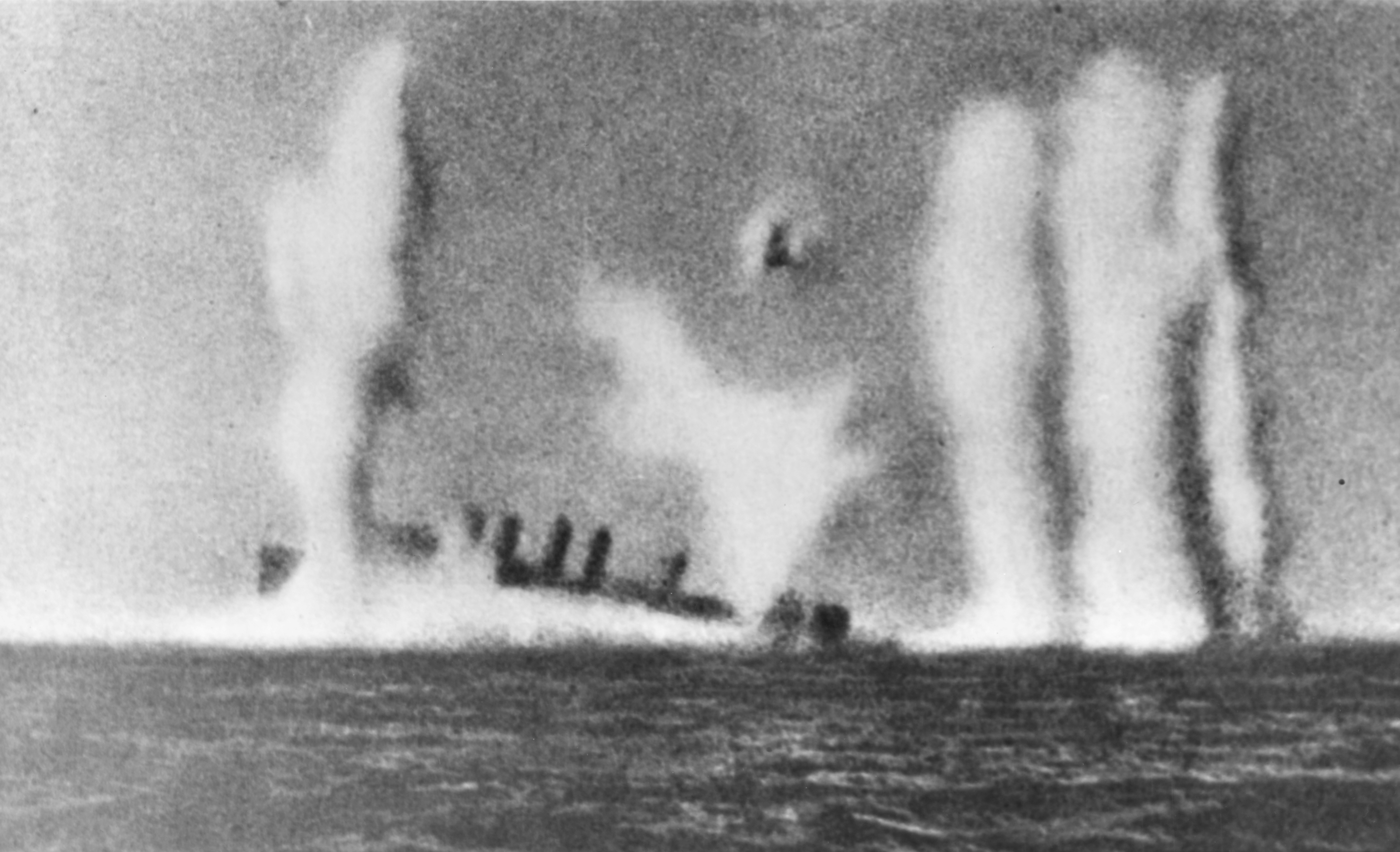
USS Edsall sinking

During an unrelated, undisclosed mission off the coast of Christmas Island in mid-2023, Stoker discovered the wreck of Edsall. The shipwreck was located by "advanced robotic and autonomous systems normally used for hydrographic survey capabilities," according to Vice Admiral Mark Hammond, head of the Royal Australian Navy. Despite being located in mid-2023, the announcement of the wreck's discovery was delayed until late 2024 to coincide with Veterans Day in the US and Remembrance Day in the UK/Australia.

== See also ==
- List of active Royal Australian Navy ships
