= Kilo-class submarine =

Diesel electric submarine class

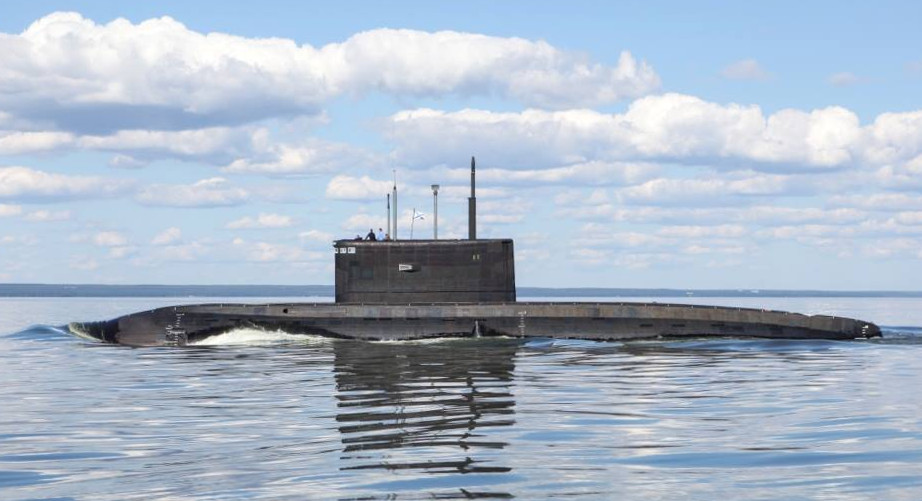
- Russian Black Sea Fleet Improved Kilo-class submarine B-265 Krasnodar in 2015

Class overview
- Builders: Rubin Design Bureau; Krasnoye Sormovo Shipyard; Amur Shipbuilding Plant; Admiralty Shipyard; Sevmash
- Operators: See Operators
- Preceded by: Tango class
- Succeeded by: Lada class
- Subclasses: Sindhughosh class
- Built: 1980–present
- In service: 1980–present
- In commission: December 1980–present
- Completed: 75
- Active: 56
- Lost: 2
- Retired: 17
- Preserved: 1

General characteristics
- Type: Attack submarine
- Displacement: Surfaced: 2,325 (Project 877) – 2,350 (Project 636.3) tons; Submerged: 3,075 tons full load (Project 877); 3,950 tons full load (Project 636.3)
- Length: 72.6 m (238 ft 2 in) (Project 877); 73.8 m (242 ft 2 in) (Project 636.3)
- Beam: 9.9 m (32 ft 6 in)
- Draft: 6.2 m (20 ft 4 in)
- Installed power: Diesel-electric
- Propulsion: Diesel-electric propulsion; 2 × 1000 kW diesel generators; 1 × 5,500–6,800 shp (4,100–5,100 kW) propulsion motor; 1 × fixed-pitch 6-bladed (Project 877) or 7-bladed (Project 636) propeller
- Speed: Surfaced: 17 knots (31 km/h; 20 mph); Submerged: 20 knots (37 km/h; 23 mph)
- Range: With snorkel: 6,000–7,500 nmi (11,100–13,900 km; 6,900–8,600 mi) at 7 kn (13 km/h; 8.1 mph); Submerged: 400 nmi (740 km; 460 mi) at 3 kn (5.6 km/h; 3.5 mph); Full run: 12.7 nmi (23.5 km; 14.6 mi) at 21 kn (39 km/h; 24 mph)
- Endurance: 45 days
- Test depth: Operational: 240 m (790 ft); Maximum: 300 m (980 ft)
- Complement: 52
- Armament: 6 × 533 mm (21 in) torpedo tubes; 18 torpedoes; 4 Kalibr/Club land-attack cruise missile, anti-ship missile and anti-submarine missile (some versions); 24 mines; 8 9K34 Strela-3 (SA-N-8 Gremlin) or 8 9K310 Igla-1 (SA-N-10 Gimlet) surface-to-air missiles (export submarines may not be equipped with air defense weapons)

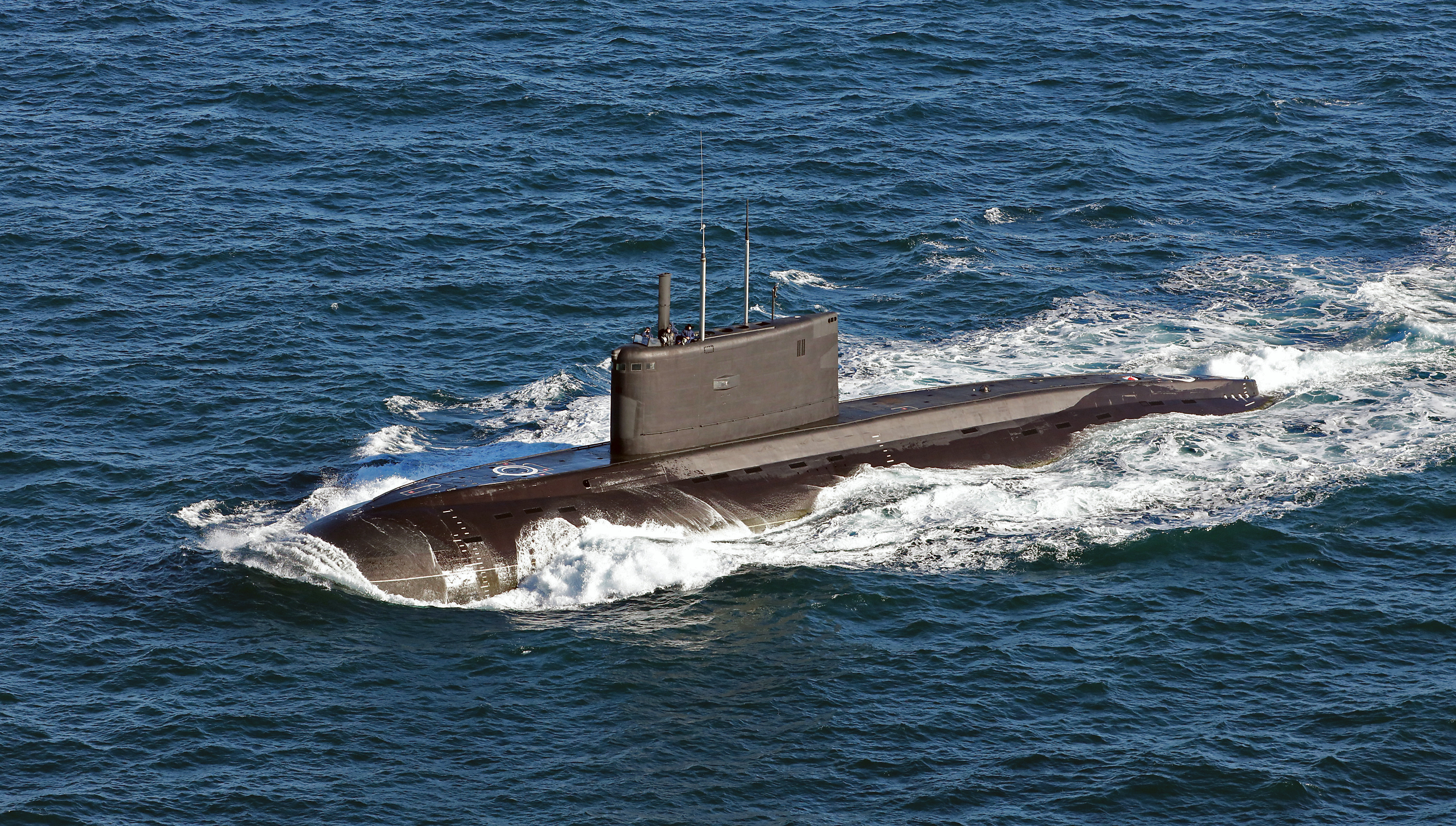
Russian Project 877 in the English Channel in 2018

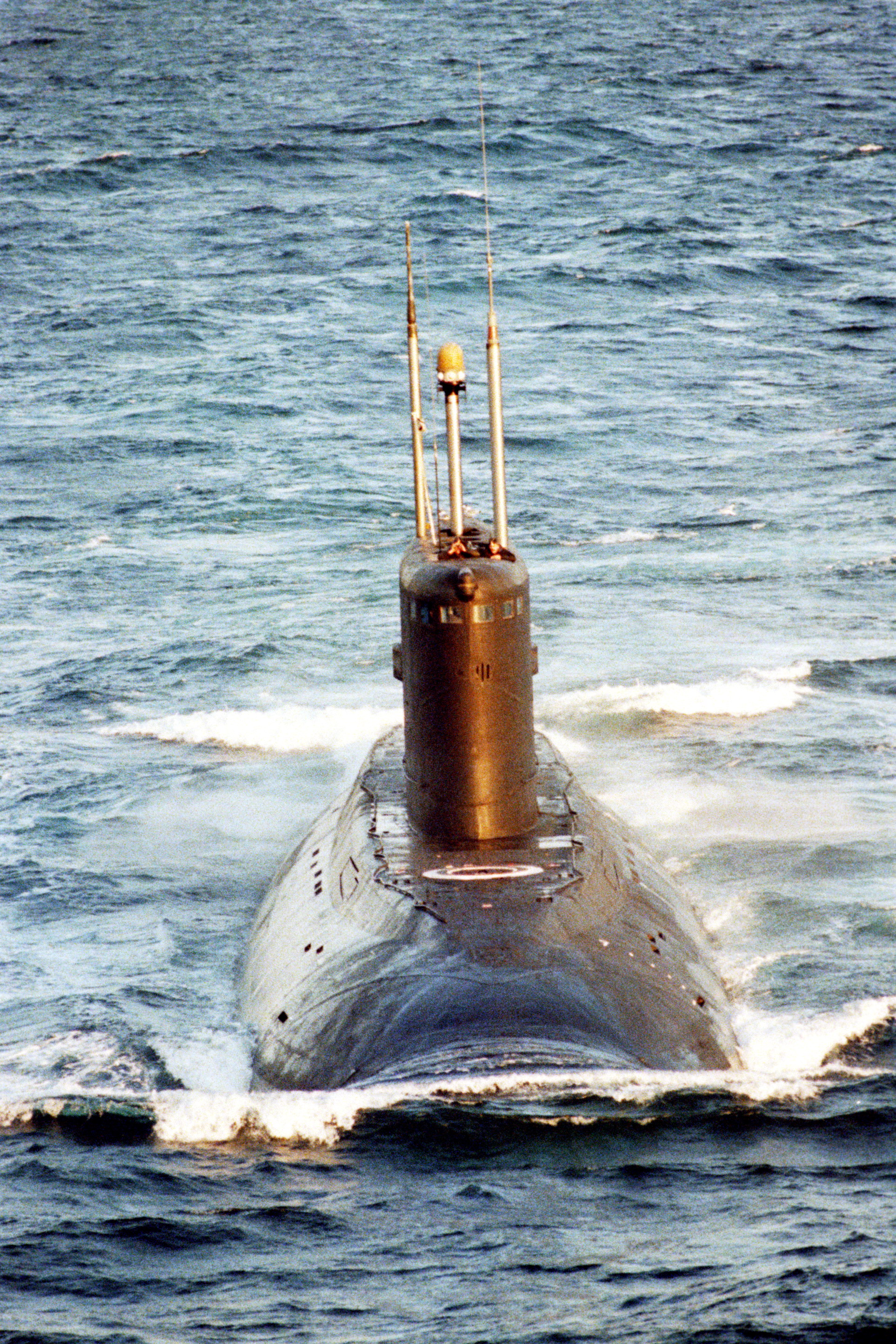
A Russian Kilo-class submarine underway on the surface

The Kilo-class submarines are a group of diesel-electric attack submarines designed by the Rubin Design Bureau in the Soviet Union in the 1970s and built originally for the Soviet Navy. Since it was introduced, more than 70 Kilo-class boats have been built, and around 60 were in active service as of 2023, not only in Russia but also in Algeria, Vietnam, India, Iran, Myanmar, and Poland.

The first version had the Soviet designation Project 877 Paltus (Russian: Па́лтус, meaning "halibut"), NATO reporting name Kilo. They entered operational service in 1980 and continued being built until the mid-1990s, when production switched to the more advanced Project 636 Varshavyanka variant, also known in the West as the Improved Kilo class. The design was updated again by the Russian Navy in the mid-2010s to a variant called Project 636.3, also known as Improved Kilo II. Due to the delays and other problems with the successor Lada-class submarine, the Improved Kilo II has been built in larger numbers, with several more units under construction as of 2023.

== Role ==
The Project 877 attack submarines were mainly intended for anti-shipping and anti-submarine operations in relatively shallow waters. Original Project 877 boats are equipped with the Rubikon MGK-400 sonar system (with NATO reporting name Shark Gill), which includes a mine detection and avoidance sonar MG-519 Arfa (with NATO reporting name Mouse Roar).

Newer Project 636 boats are equipped with improved MGK-400EM, with MG-519 Arfa also upgraded to MG-519EM. MGK 400E can detect submarines with 0.05 Pa/Hz noisiness in 16 km (9.9 mi) and surface vessels with 10 Pa/Hz noisiness in 100 km (62 mi). The improved sonar systems have reduced the number of operators needed by sharing the same console via automation.

Anechoic tiles are fitted on casings and fins to absorb the sound waves of active sonar, which results in a reduction and distortion of the return signal. These tiles also help attenuate sounds that are emitted from the submarine, thus reducing the range at which the submarine may be detected by passive sonar.

Project 636 and 636.3 submarines can launch Kalibr (and their Club export version) cruise missiles. It was reported in September 2022 that they can carry four Kalibr missiles, and can launch them through two of their six torpedo tubes.

== History ==
Kilo-class attack submarines began entering service with the Soviet Navy from 12 September 1980. They were originally intended for the Warsaw Pact nations, which is why their Russian nickname is Varshavyanka (woman from Warsaw). Among the first to be built, 13 were from the Krasnoye Sormovo Factory No. 112 in Nizhny Novgorod, and nine were from Amur Shipbuilding Plant in Komsomolsk-on-Amur. After the dissolution of the Soviet Union, another two Project 877 submarines were built for the Russian Navy in the 1990s. The Krasnoye Sormovo facility partnered with Admiralty Shipyards in Saint Petersburg to build 21 boats for foreign buyers (as of 2001), which included China, India, Algeria, Iran, Poland, and Romania, for a total of 45 units. Modified units for export were designated Project 877E, and those made for tropical waters were Project 877EKM. Another variant, Project 636 (NATO: Improved Kilo), was quieter, faster, and had better detection capabilities. Initially intended for Soviet use, it was made available for export in 1993.

A single Project 877 submarine, B-871 Alrosa, is equipped with pump-jet propulsion, instead of a propeller. It has been retrofitted for the Kalibr missile. Its modification was started in 1990 and was not completed until 2000. When it returned to service, it was the only operational submarine in the Black Sea Fleet at the time.

It was planned for the Improved Kilo-class (Project 636) to be succeeded by the Lada class (Project 677) in Russian Navy service. On 26 December 1997, two boats, one for Russia and one intended for India, were laid down. However, by November 2011 it was apparent that the Lada class would be delayed because Sankt Peterburg, the lead boat of the class, had shown major deficiencies. On 27 July 2012, the Russian Navy commander-in-chief announced that construction of the Lada-class submarines would resume, having undergone design changes. Series production was reported to be underway in the latter 2010s.

The Russian Navy also moved forward with the construction of Project 636.3, also known as Improved Kilo II, the result of further modifications. The class "is slightly longer in length—the submarine's submerged displacement is around 4,000 tons—and features improved engines, an improved combat system, as well as new noise reduction technology; it can fire both torpedoes and cruise missiles, launched from one of six 533-millimeter torpedo tubes." The class has a seven-bladed propeller, instead of the six-bladed propeller of the Project 877 class. In 2010, construction began on the first unit of the Improved Kilo II, Novorossiysk, which was part of a batch of six submarines built for the Black Sea Fleet. The last of this group was delivered in 2016. Another six were ordered for the Pacific Fleet, with the first entering service in 2019, Petropavlovsk-Kamchatsky. The last of these was scheduled to be delivered in 2025.

In June 2022, an unconfirmed report from within Russia's defense industry suggested that a further tranche of six additional Project 636.3 vessels might be ordered to start construction in around 2024. That year, the first boat for the Northern Fleet was laid down, Mariupol, with all six of them to be named after cities in Russian-annexed parts of Ukraine.

== Specifications ==
Schematic drawing of Kilo-class submarine

There are several variants of the Kilo class. The information below is the smallest and largest number from the available information for all three main variants of the boat.

- Displacement:
  - 2,300–2,350 tons surfaced
  - 3,000–4,000 tons submerged
- Dimensions:
  - Length: 70–74 meters
  - Beam: 9.9 meters
  - Draft: 6.2–6.5 meters
- Maximum speed
  - 10–12 knots surfaced (18–22 km/h)
  - 17–25 knots submerged (31–46 km/h)
- Propulsion: Diesel-electric 5,900 shp (4,400 kW)
- Maximum depth: 300 meters (240–250 meters operational)
- Endurance
  - 400 nautical miles (700 km) at 3 knots (6 km/h) submerged
  - 6,000 nautical miles (11,000 km) at 7 knots (13 km/h) snorkeling (7,500 miles for the Improved Kilo class)
  - 45 days sea endurance
- Armament
  - Air defence: A Man-portable air-defense system Igla-1.
  - Six 533 mm torpedo tubes with 18 53-65 ASuW or TEST 71/76 ASW torpedoes or VA-111 Shkval supercavitating torpedoes, or 24 DM-1 mines,
- Crew: 52
- Price per unit is US$200–250 million (China paid about US$1.5–2 billion for 8 Project 636 Kilo-class submarines in 2002)

== Operational history ==
=== China ===
As of 2017, China's Kilo-class submarines were split between the East Sea Fleet and the South Sea Fleet. The East Sea Fleet operated a mix of Project 877, 636, and 636.6 boats, with an estimated eight boats forming the 42nd Flotilla based out of Xingshan (the two 877 boats have since been retired and scrapped). The South China Sea fleet operated four 636.6 boats, with the 32nd Flotilla (along with four Type 039 Song class) out of Yulin.

At the beginning of 2014, the Chinese PLA Navy held an emergency combat readiness test. The Kilo-class submarine Yuanzheng 72, deployed on a combat readiness voyage, encountered a "cliff" caused by a sudden change in seawater density. Because the seawater density suddenly decreased, the submarine lost its buoyancy and rapidly descended. The pressure on the submarine increased sharply, and the main engine room pipeline was damaged, and water entered. The vessel lost power due to a large amount of water entering the main engine room. The crew reacted quickly, and the submarine resurfaced in three minutes, avoiding a disastrous descent to the seabed, which was more than 3,000 metres (9,800 ft) deep. The voyage was notable for creating many firsts for PLAN's submarine service.

China has retired both of its Project 877EKM boats in 2021 and makes them as museum ship. The two boats—Yuanzheng 64 and Yuanzheng 65 (SS 364 and 365)—were launched and commissioned in 1994 and 1995, respectively. These were the first Kilo-class submarines acquired by the Chinese, and the ships may have been decommissioned as they were not digitized, cannot fire updated weapons, and, being Russian-built, may be less desirable to upgrade.

=== Russia ===
==== Syrian Civil War ====
In 2015, five Kilo-class submarines were deployed to the Russian naval facility in Tartus, Syria. At least two of the units reportedly attacked land targets inside Syria with 3M54 Kalibr cruise missiles (NATO designation: SS-N-27A "Sizzler"). 8 December 2015 marked the first time a Kilo-class submarine fired cruise missiles against an enemy. Rostov-na-Donu struck two targets near the ISIS capital of Raqqa in the missile attack. The B-237 Rostov-on-Don transited the Dardanelles on its way back to the Black Sea on 12 February 2022.

==== War in Ukraine ====
Since the start of the Russian invasion of Ukraine in 2022, the Kilo-class submarines of the Black Sea Fleet have participated in the conflict, firing Kalibr cruise missiles into Ukraine. After the sinking of the Russian cruiser Moskva in April 2022, it was remarked that the Kilo-class submarines were the only members of the Black Sea Fleet whose orders did not prohibit venturing into Ukrainian waters near Odesa during the Russian invasion of Ukraine. In September 2022, after the early 2022 Crimea attacks, the UK Ministry of Defence said that the Kilo-class submarines were moved from Sevastopol to the Port of Novorossiysk in Krasnodar Krai. B-871 Alrosa, a pump-jet Kilo class, which derives from the Project 877 hull, participated in the Russo-Ukraine War.

On 13 September 2023, B-237 Rostov-on-Don was severely damaged by a Ukrainian Storm Shadow missile strike while it was drydocked in Sevastopol. According to satellite images taken in June 2024, the submarine was moved to a lesser-used dry dock within the port (at coordinates 44.609975029014116, 33.537496816089906). Camouflage nets were, at least initially, thrown up to disguise its presence and to make observation more challenging. According to reports, the submarine is under repair.

On 2 August 2024, Ukrainian Forces launched a strike against a Russian submarine and an S-400 air defense system in Crimea. Ukrainian sources claimed that the submarine B-237 Rostov-on-Don was "sunk on the spot" in the attack. Other sources claim that the submarine was only hit and not sunk. Satellite images showed that the camouflage nets were burned out by the strike.

In September 2025, the Project 636.3 boat, Novorossiysk (B-261), reportedly suffered serious damage as the result of a fuel system malfunction while operating in the Mediterranean.

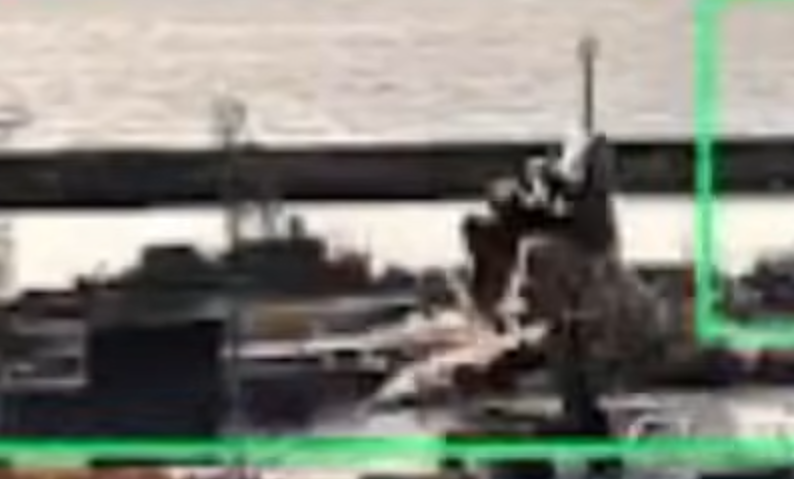
December 2025 explosion in the Port of Novorossiysk

In December 2025, the Security Service of Ukraine published a video showing an explosion near an unnamed Kilo-class submarine in the Port of Novorossiysk, claiming that the submarine was struck by a "Sub Sea Baby" drone. Satellite imagery published after the attack showed that the drone struck a pier 20 meters off the stern. Russia claimed that the attack didn't damage the vessel. Other sources say that it is unclear if the attack damaged the submarine. The UK Ministry of Defence considered it highly likely that the attacked submarine was the B-271 Kolpino, noted that as of 18 December 2025 the submarine was docked where it was attacked and considered it likely that the attack had significantly damaged the submarine, leaving it unable to deploy or sail of its own accord.

In April 2026 it was reported that two Kilo-class submarines, Mozhaisk and Dmitrov, were photographed with anti-drone defences. These defences included the mounting of a heavy machine gun on the aft behind the sail, installation of an anti-drone cage and equipping a searchlight on the navigation bridge.

=== Iran ===
The Islamic Republic of Iran Navy acquired three Kilo-class submarines (Project 877EKM, locally named the Tareq class) between 1992 and 1996, as part of a series of military deals with the Russian Federation after the conclusion of the Iran-Iraq War. Iran acquired these submarines for $600 million per boat, and they are based out of Bandar Abbas Naval Station with the aim of keeping two in service at any given time. They are believed to have limited utility due to the unique salinity and shallow water of the Straits of Hormuz and the Gulf of Oman, the main areas of operation for the Iranian Submarine force. The Kilo-class submarines are the only ocean-going submarines of the Iranian Navy and have been upgraded throughout their service, including with an increasing spread in deployable munitions; they can now also carry Iranian-designed anti-ship missiles and seamines apart from their torpedo complement. They were overhauled in 2012 within Iran, and some components were replaced with those built locally. In 2012, the Taregh underwent servicing and was returned to service with the Iranian Navy.

==== 2026 War in the Persian Gulf ====
During the 2026 War in the Persian Gulf, American Army ATACMS and HIMARS Rocket and Missile Systems were used to strike Naval targets cross the Strait, and at least one Kilo-class submarine was hit according to Gen. Dan Caine, the Chairman of the Joint Chiefs of Staff, and satellite imagery shows that a Kilo-class submarine (identified by some sources as the Taregh) was hit and destroyed while docked.

=== Romania ===
Romania acquired a single Kilo-class (Project 877) boat named the Delfinul (Dolphin), commissioned into the Romanian Navy in 1985 when Romania was still a Communist nation within the Eastern Bloc. The Romanian government identified the need for a submarine force and naval modernization in the 1980s and compared both Western designs (but was rebuffed by Germany, France, and the Netherlands) and Chinese designs (notably the Type 33), which was found to be obsolete and the Kilo class. The Romanian government paid $61.5 million for the submarine and operated it until 1995, when a lack of support forced the Navy to halt operations. It is still officially in reserve today.

=== Poland ===
Poland, like Romania, ordered its Kilo-class submarines during the Cold War as a member of the Eastern Bloc. Its sole Kilo-class submarine, the ORP Orzel, was commissioned in 1986 and is the oldest Kilo-class submarine in active service today and the only submarine operated by the Polish Navy. The Polish Navy is looking to replace the submarine with Swedish built submarines of the A26 class starting in 2030 with the HSwMS Södermanland acting as an interim replacement from 2027 onwards.

=== Myanmar ===
The Myanmar Navy acquired its first submarine (and first Kilo-class submarine) in 2020 when an ex-Indian Navy Project 877EKM boat was handed over. The ship—UMS Minye Theinkhathu (formerly the INS Sindhuvir)—was refitted in Hindustan Shipyard but originally commissioned into the Indian Navy in 1987. The ship is of the Sindhughosh-class submarine, an Indian built derivation of the Project 877EKM. The ship has been deployed in multiple exercises since its commissioning, including exercises alongside the only other submarine in the navy, the UMS Minye Kyaw Htin, a Type 035 submarine delivered by China in 2021.

== Operators ==
The first submarine entered service in the Soviet Navy in 1980, and the class remains in use with the Russian Navy today; around 5 original Kilo-class vessels believed to still be in active service with the Russian Navy (as of 2025), while new Improved Kilo-class submarines are being delivered through the 2020s to replace them. About forty vessels have been exported to several countries:

- Algeria
  - Algerian National Navy: 2 original Kilo (Project 877), 4 Improved Kilo (Project 636).
- China
  - People's Liberation Army Navy: 2 original Kilo (Project 877), 10 Improved Kilo (Project 636).
- India
  - Indian Navy: 10 original Kilo (Project 877EKM), 1 sustained major casualty – designated as the Sindhughosh class
- Myanmar
  - Myanmar Navy: one boat transferred from Indian Navy by March 2020.
- Poland
  - Polish Navy: 1 original Kilo (Project 877E) – ORP Orzeł.
- Iran
  - Islamic Republic of Iran Navy: 3 original Kilo (Project 877EKM).
- Romania
  - Romanian Naval Forces: 1 original Kilo (Project 877) – Romanian submarine Delfinul (not operational).
- Russia
  - Russian Navy: 5 original Kilo (Project 877) (status of 4 others, 2 Pacific & 2 Northern Fleet unclear), 12 Improved Kilo (Project 636.3) delivered as of 2025. Up to six additional Project 636.3 intended to replace remaining Project 877 units; first three ordered in 2023.
- Vietnam
  - Vietnam People's Navy: 6 Improved Kilo (Project 636) – Hồ Chí Minh City, Hà Nội, Hải Phòng, Đà Nẵng, Khánh Hoà, Bà Rịa-Vũng Tàu.

=== Possible purchasers ===
The government of Venezuela expressed interest since 2005 in acquiring nine AIP-powered conventional submarines, either the German U214 or later the Amur 1650. There was a Russian counteroffer due to technical issues at the shipyards back then, for five Project 636 Kilo-class and four Amur 1650, but it hasn't gone through yet.

In 2017, the Philippine Navy showed interest in the Kilo-class submarine as part of its modernization program. Defense Secretary Delfin Lorenzana said the country was evaluating a Russian offer.

=== Failed bids ===
The Indonesian Navy was interested in purchasing two used Kilo-class submarines, but the Chief of Staff of the Indonesian Navy Laksamana Marsetio cancelled the plans in 2014 after inspecting the two submarines in Russia with an Indonesian Navy team. He said, "The submarines look good on the outside, but the inside is filled with broken equipment, and the two submarines have been in storage for two years." Indonesia instead bought six Improved Jang Bogo-class submarines, later known as Nagapasa-class submarine, including a transfer of technology, where Indonesia will eventually build four of six of the submarines with South Korea.

== Gallery ==
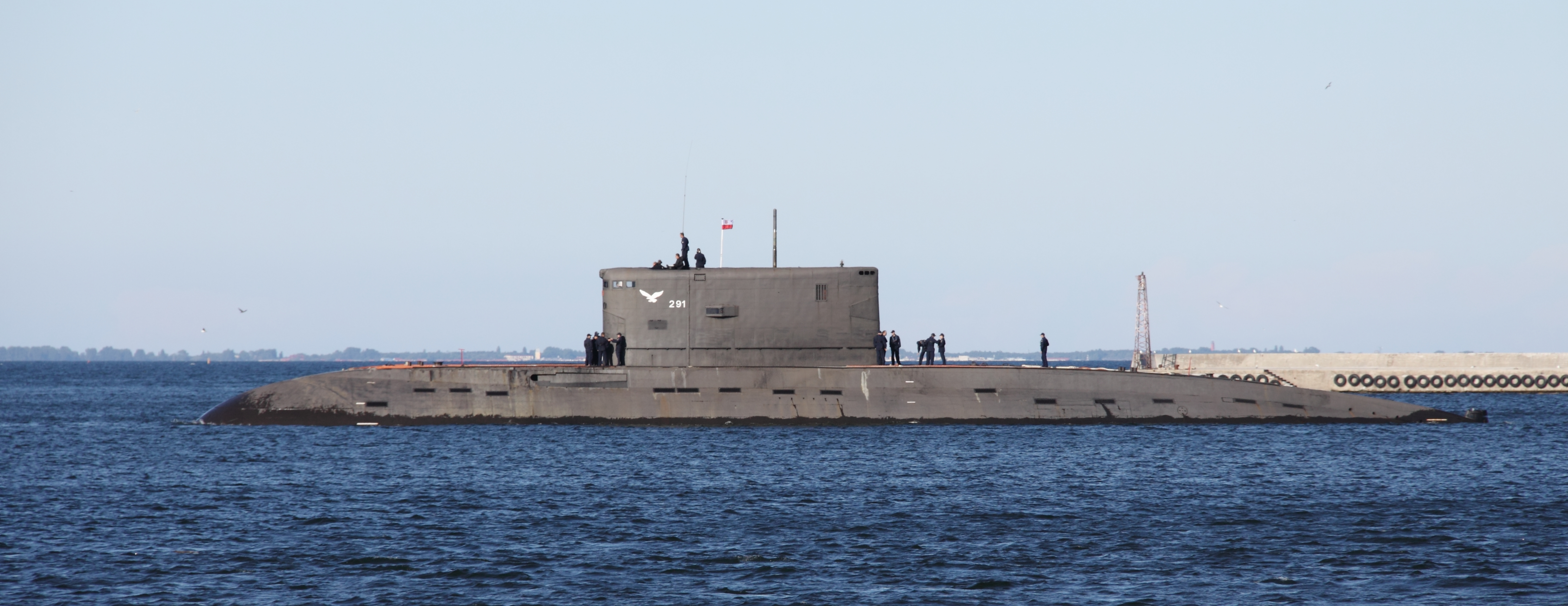
The Polish Kilo-class submarine ORP Orzeł, 26 June 2011

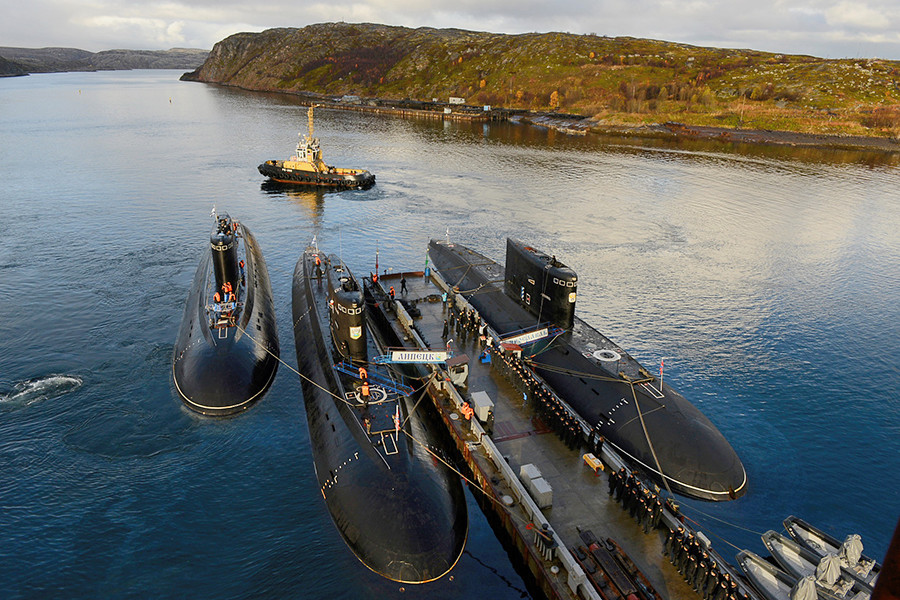
Russian Kilo-class submarines in Polyarny, Murmansk Oblast

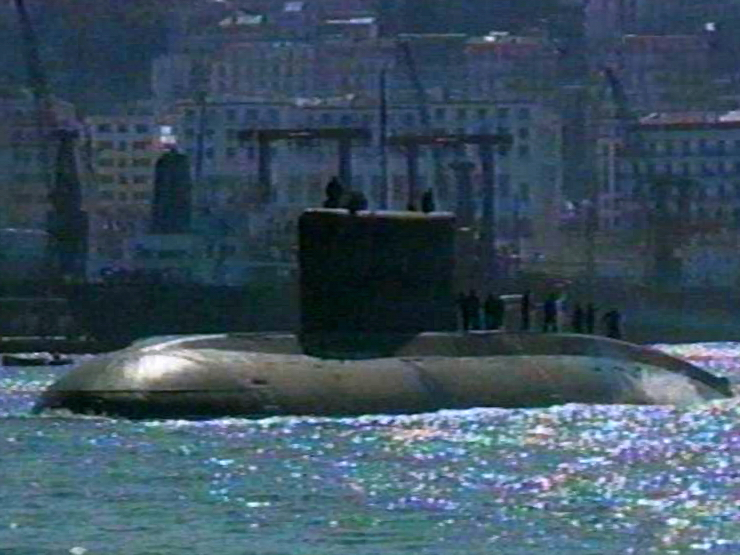
An Algerian Kilo-class submarine

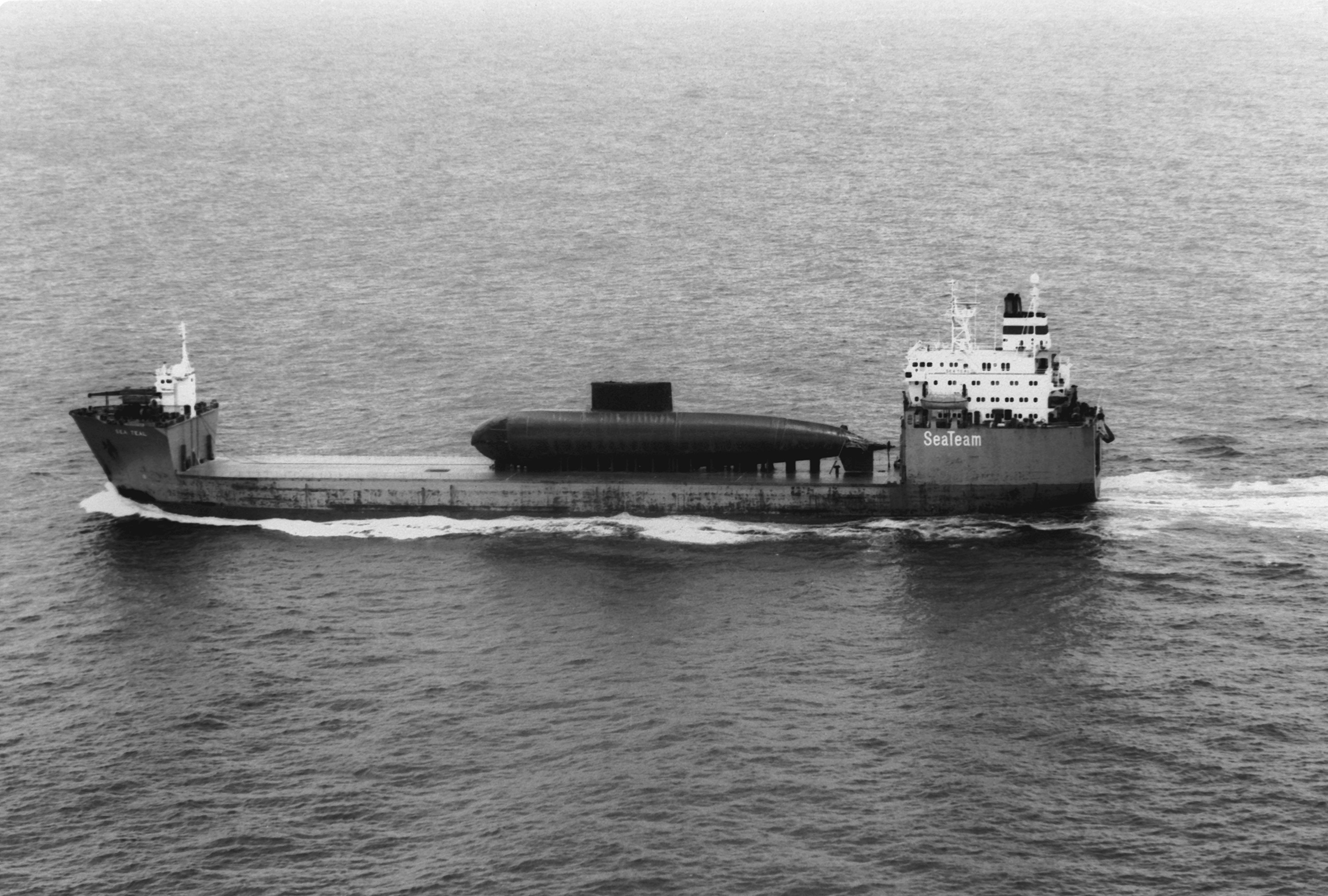
A Chinese Kilo-class submarine being delivered from Russia as deck cargo in 1995.

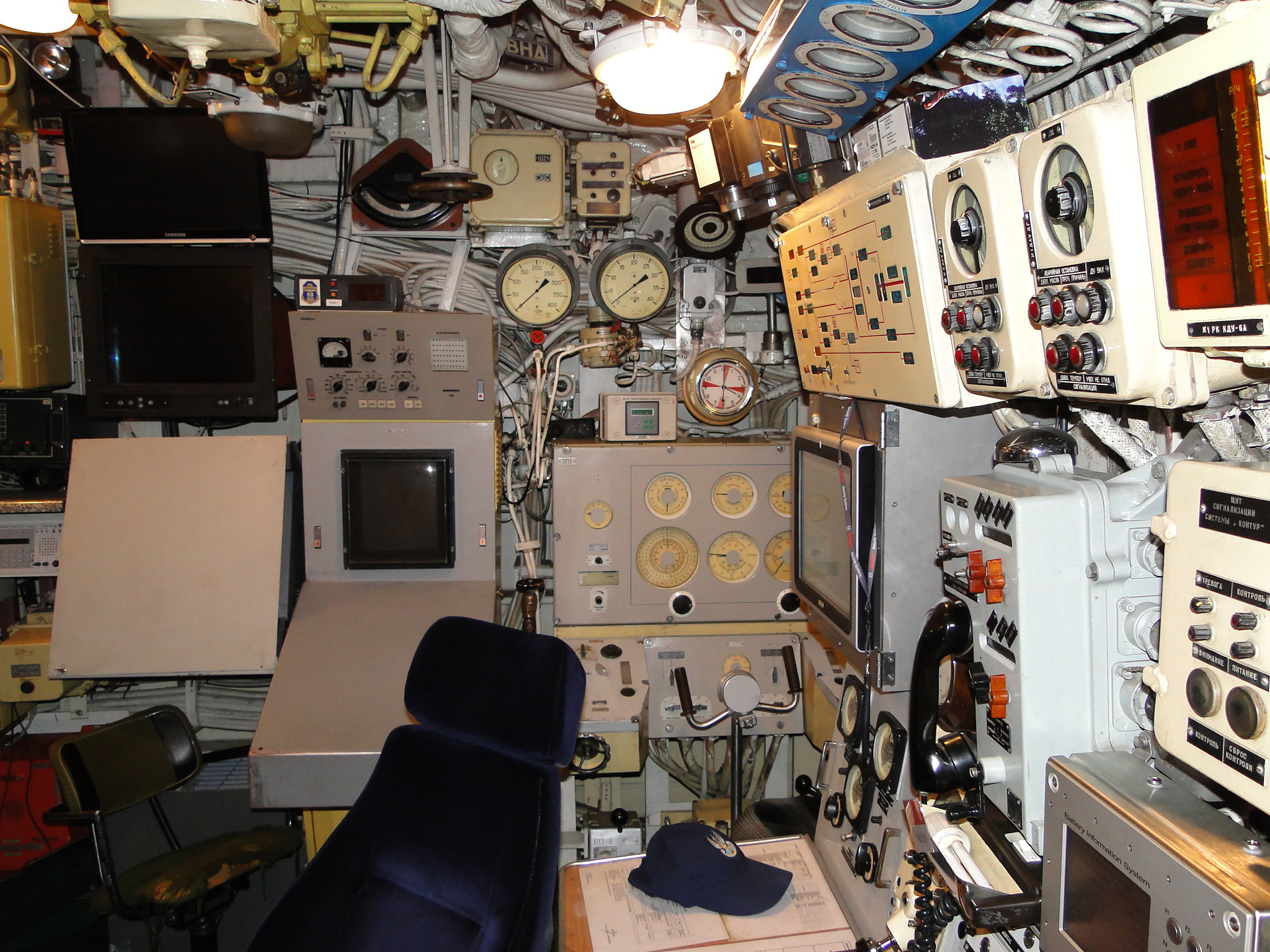
ORP Orzeł, the control room of an 877E-class submarine

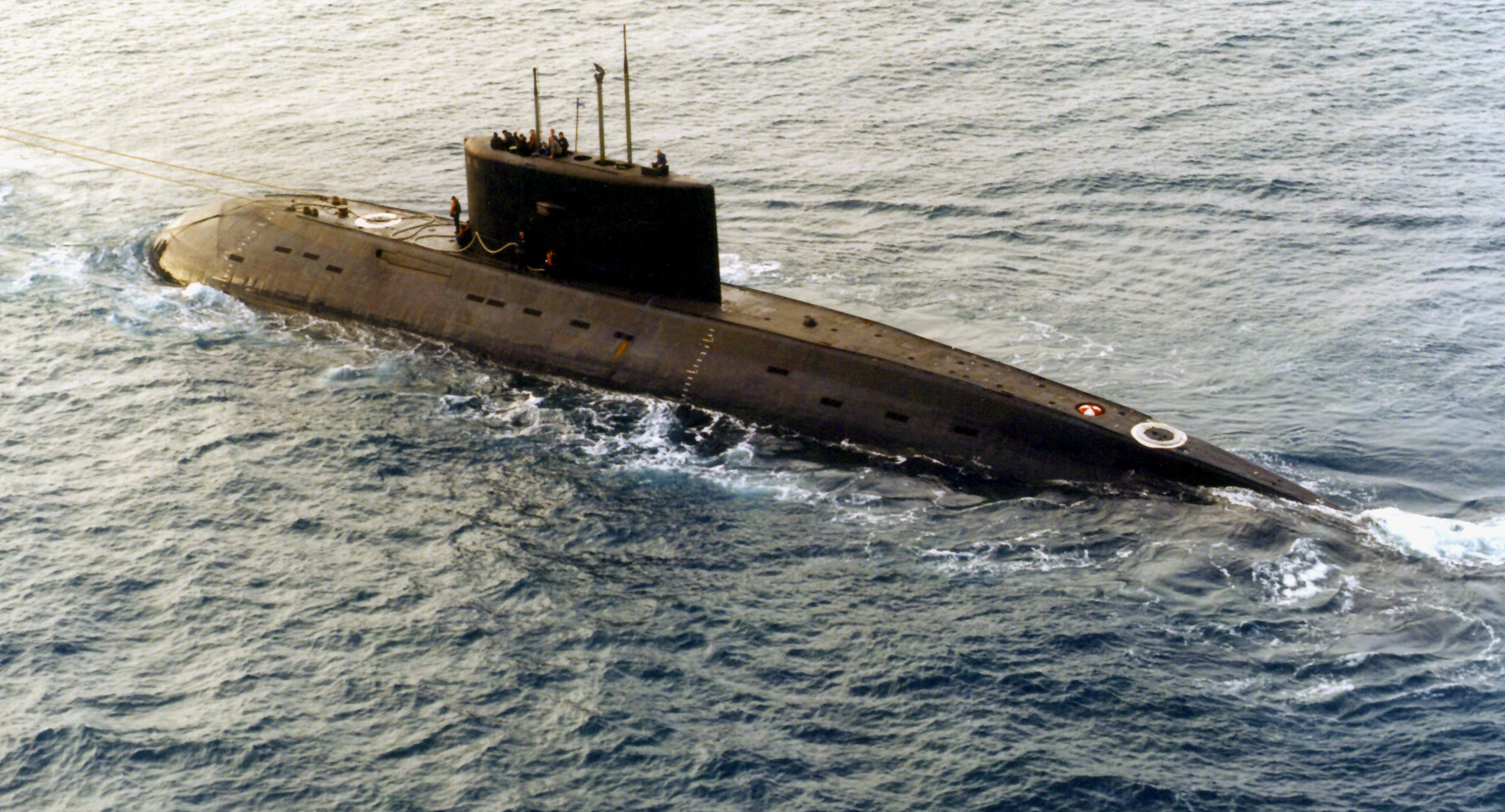
The Iranian Kilo-class submarine Yunes, during delivery in 1995.

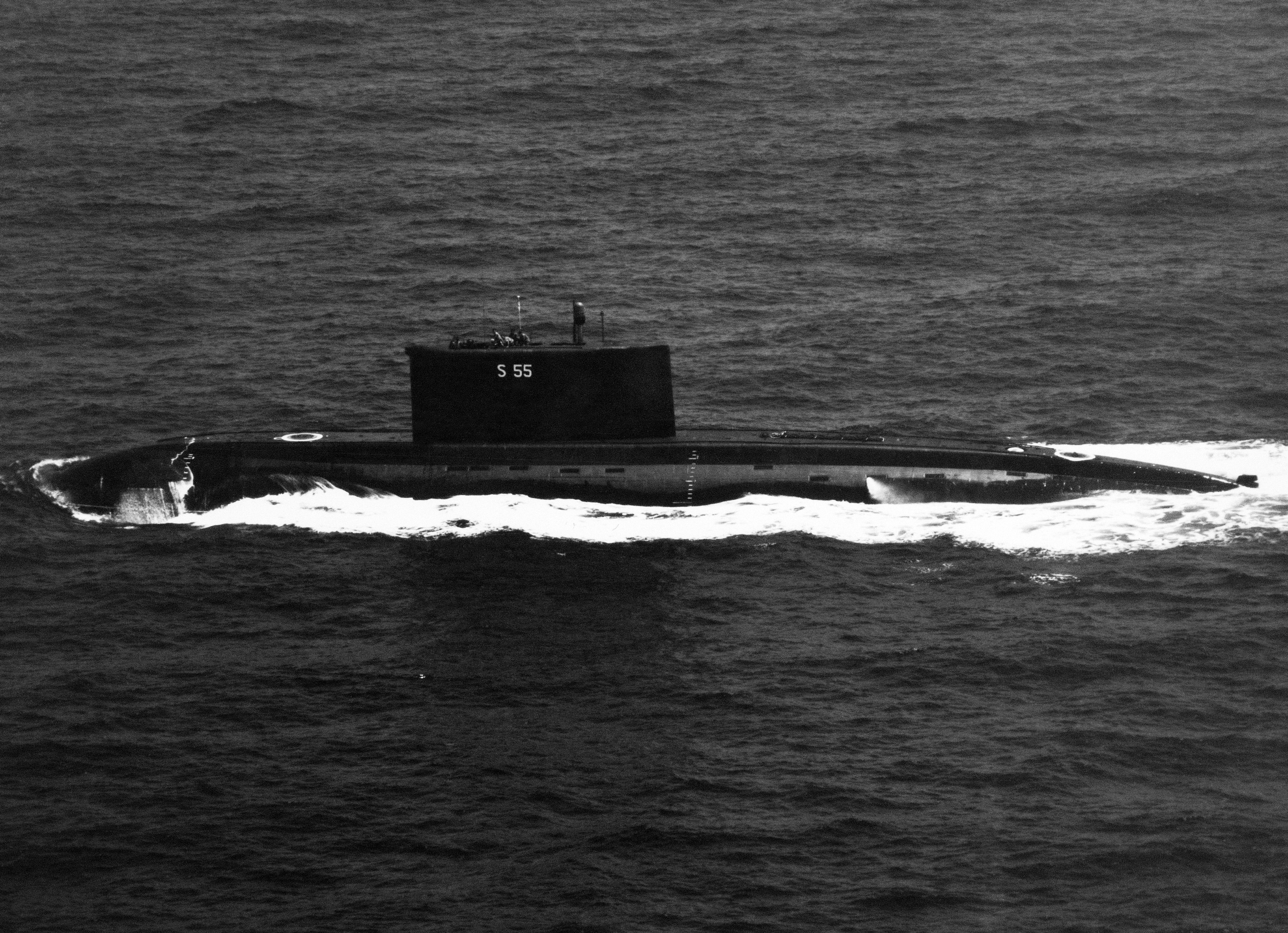
Indian Kilo-class submarine, INS Sindhughosh

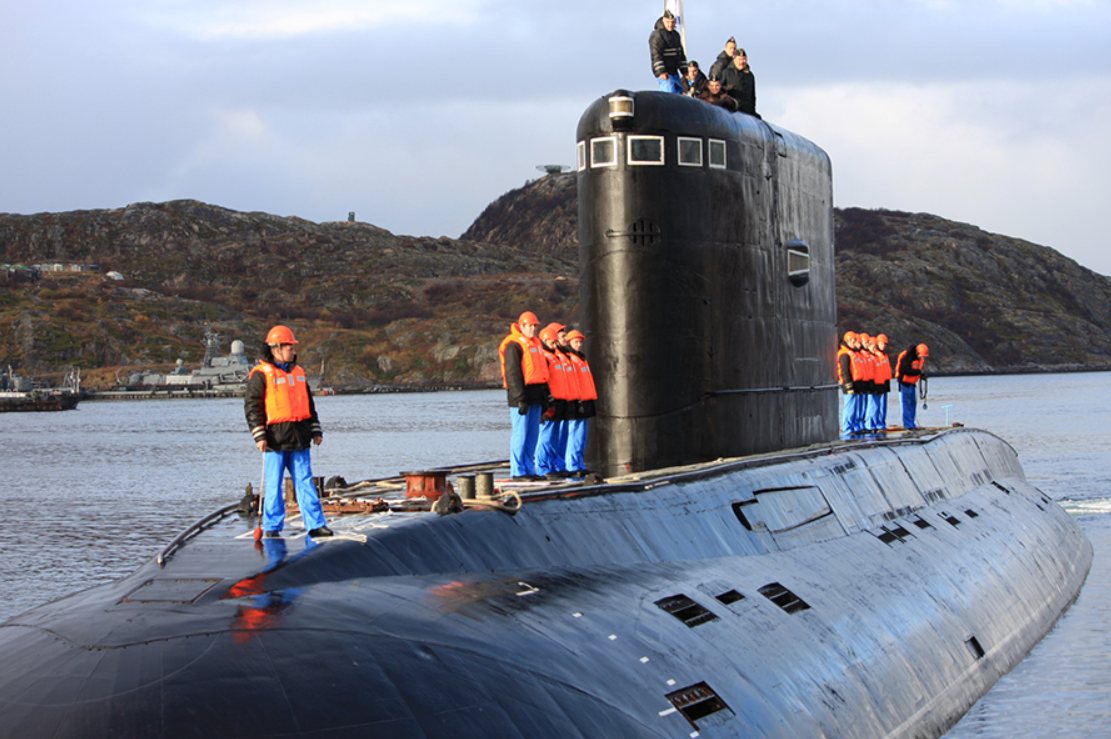
Diesel submarine Kilo-class Kaluga returns from a long voyage

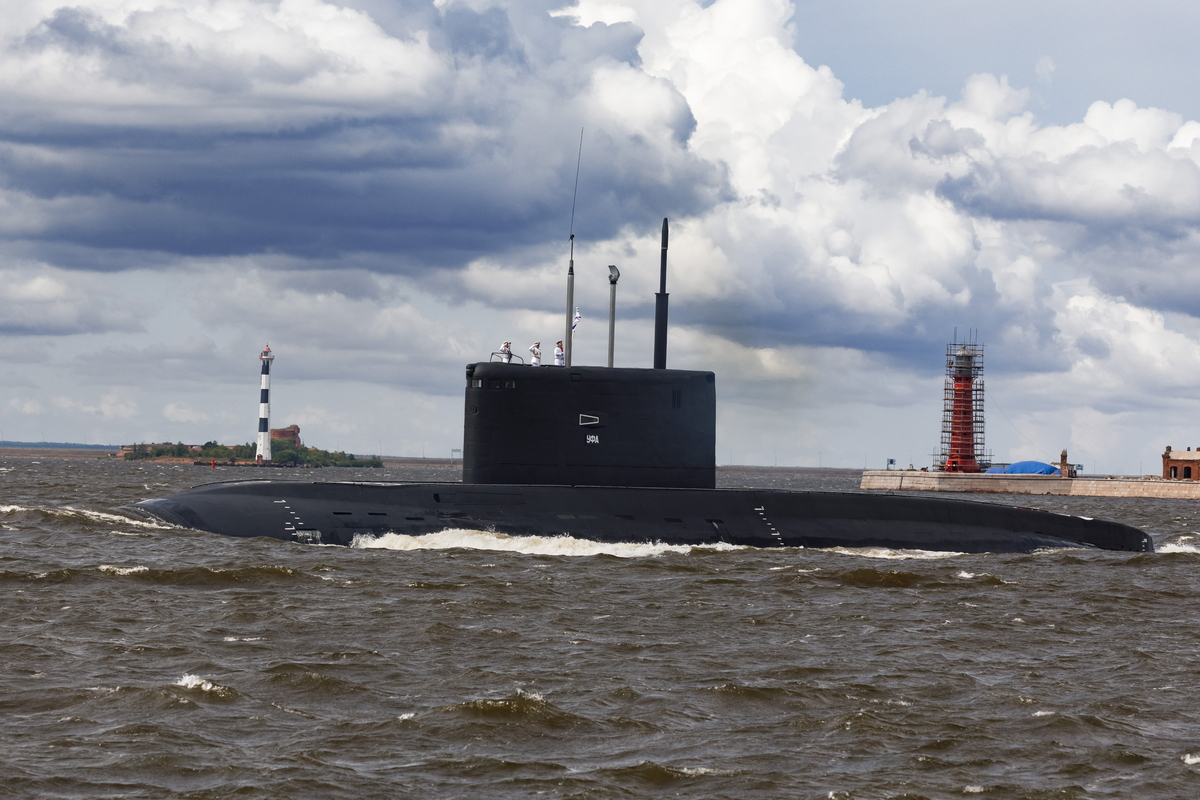
Russian Improved Kilo-class submarine Ufa during the Russian Navy Day parade in 2023.

== List of submarines ==
=== Project 877 ===
Operator	#	Name	Shipyard	Project	Laid down	Launched	Commissioned	Fleet	Status
Russia	B-248	—N/a	Komsomolsk-on-Amur	877	16 Mar 1980	12 Sep 1980	31 Dec 1980		Decommissioned 2001
Russia	B-260	Chita	Komsomolsk-on-Amur	877	22 Feb 1981	23 Aug 1981	30 Dec 1981	PF	Decommissioned 2013, sank partially on way to scrap in 2019
Russia	B-227	Vyborg	Komsomolsk-on-Amur	877	23 Feb 1982	16 Sep 1982	23 Feb 1983	BF	Decommissioned 2018 (exhibit of the Patriot park in Kronstadt)
Russia	B-229	—N/a	Komsomolsk-on-Amur	877	23 Feb 1983	15 Jul 1983	30 Oct 1983		Decommissioned 2002
Russia	B-404	—N/a	Komsomolsk-on-Amur	877	7 May 1983	24 Sep 1983	30 Dec 1983		Decommissioned 2002
Russia	B-401	Novosibirsk	Nizhniy Novgorod	877	6 Oct 1982	15 Mar 1984	30 Sep 1984	NF	Decommissioned 2012
Russia	B-402	Vologda	Nizhniy Novgorod	877	24 Aug 1983	29 Sep 1984	30 Dec 1984	NF	Decommissioned 2016
Russia	B-405	(ex Tyumenskiy Komsomolets)	Komsomolsk-on-Amur	877	20 Apr 1984	21 Sep 1984	30 Dec 1984		Decommissioned 2002
Poland	291 (ex-B-351)	Orzeł	Nizhniy Novgorod	877E	29 Sep 1984	7 Jun 1985	29 Apr 1986		Active as of 2010
Romania	581 (ex-B-801)	Delfinul	Nizhniy Novgorod	877E	1984	1985	Aug 1985		Unknown (in reserve since 1995)
India	S55	Sindhughosh	Saint Petersburg	877EKM	29 May 1983	29 Jul 1985	25 Nov 1985		Decommissioned on 19 December 2025
Russia	B-470	—N/a	Komsomolsk-on-Amur	877	6 May 1985	27 Aug 1985	30 Dec 1985		Decommissioned 2005
Russia	B-806	Dmitrov	Nizhniy Novgorod	877EKM	15 Oct 1984	30 Apr 1986	25 Sep 1986	BF	Active as of 2025
India	S56	Sindhudhvaj	Saint Petersburg	877EKM	1 Apr 1986	27 Jul 1986	25 Nov 1986		Decommissioned on 16 Jul 2022
Algeria	012	Rais Hadj Mubarek	Nizhniy Novgorod	877EKM	1985	1986	29 Nov 1986		Upgraded in 2010, able to launch Kalibr/Club missiles
Russia	B-439	—N/a	Komsomolsk-on-Amur	877	4 Apr 1986	31 Jul 1986	30 Dec 1986		Decommissioned 2005
India	S57	Sindhuraj	Nizhniy Novgorod	877EKM	1986	1987	2 Sep 1987		Active as of 2010, modernized to project 08773 in 1999–2001
Algeria	013	El Hadj Slimane	Nizhniy Novgorod	877EKM	1986	1987	25 Nov 1987		Upgraded in 2011, able to launch Kalibr/Club missiles
Myanmar	71	UMS Minye Theinkhathu (ex-Sindhuvir)	Saint Petersburg	877EKM	15 May 1987	13 Sep 1987	25 Dec 1987		Modernized to project 08773 in 1997–1999, transferred to Myanmar Navy in 2020
Russia	B-445	Svyatoi Nikolai Chudotvorets	Komsomolsk-on-Amur	877	21 Mar 1987	26 Sep 1987	30 Jan 1988	PF	May have decommissioned 2020; listed as still in service by one source
India	S59	Sindhuratna	Nizhniy Novgorod	877EKM	1987	1988	14 Aug 1988		Active as of 2010, modernized to project 08773 in 2001–2003
India	S60	Sindhukesari	Saint Petersburg	877EKM	20 Apr 1988	16 Aug 1988	29 Oct 1988		Active as of 2010, modernized to project 08773 in 1999–2001
Russia	B-808	Yaroslavl	Nizhniy Novgorod	877	29 Sep 1986	30 Jul 1988	27 Dec 1988	NF	Decommissioned 2022
Russia	B-394	Nurlat	Komsomolsk-on-Amur	877	15 Apr 1988	3 Sep 1988	30 Dec 1988	PF	Status unclear; active as of 2018; likely to decommission in mid/latter 2020s
Russia	B-800	Kaluga (ex-Vologodskij komsomolets)	Nizhniy Novgorod	877LPMB	5 Mar 1987	7 May 1989	30 Sep 1989	NF	Refitted in 2009–2012, active 2022
India	S61	Sindhukirti	Saint Petersburg	877EKM	5 Apr 1989	26 Aug 1989	30 Oct 1989		Active, modernized to project 08773
Russia	B-464	Ust'-Kamchatsk	Komsomolsk-on-Amur	877	26 May 1989	23 Sep 1989	30 Jan 1990	PF	Status unclear; active as of 2018; likely to decommission in mid/latter 2020s
Russia	B-459	Vladikavkaz	Nizhniy Novgorod	877	25 Feb 1988	29 Apr 1990	30 Sep 1990	NF	Refitted in 2011–15, active, entered Baltic Sea 3 Jul 2018 to take part in Main Naval Parade in St Petersburg on 29 Jul.
India	S62	Sindhuvijay	Saint Petersburg	877EKM	6 Apr 1990	27 Jul 1990	27 Oct 1990		Modernized to project 08773 in 2005–2007. About to undergo mid-life refit as of 2025.
Russia	B-871	Alrosa	Nizhniy Novgorod	877V	17 May 1988	Sep 1989	30 Dec 1990	BSF	Refitted in 2014–2022
Russia	B-471	Magnitogorsk	Nizhniy Novgorod	877	26 Oct 1988	22 Sep 1990	30 Dec 1990	NF	Status unclear as of 2025; active as of 2018
Russia	B-494	Ust'-Bolsheretsk	Komsomolsk-on-Amur	877	5 May 1990	4 Oct 1990	30 Dec 1990	PF	Decommissioned 2023
Iran	901	Taregh	Saint Petersburg	877EKM	5 Apr 1991	25 Sep 1991	25 Dec 1991		Active as of 2012. Upgraded in Iranian shipyard.
Russia	B-187	Komsomolsk-on-Amur	Komsomolsk-on-Amur	877	7 May 1991	5 Oct 1991	30 Dec 1991	PF	Active 2018
Russia	B-177	Lipetsk	Nizhniy Novgorod	877	3 Nov 1989	27 Jul 1991	30 Dec 1991	NF	Status unclear as of 2025; active as of 2018
Russia	B-190	Krasnokamensk	Komsomolsk-on-Amur	877	8 May 1992	25 Sep 1992	30 Dec 1992	PF	Decommissioned 2023
Iran	902	Noah	Saint Petersburg	877EKM	30 Apr 1992	16 Oct 1992	31 Dec 1992		Unknown (probably in modernization in Iranian shipyard)
Russia	B-345	Mogocha	Komsomolsk-on-Amur	877	22 Apr 1993	6 Oct 1993	22 Jan 1994		Decommissioned 29 May 2021
China	364	Yuan Zheng 64 Hao	Nizhniy Novgorod	877EKM	???	1994	10 Nov 1994		Decommissioned 2021
China	365	Yuan Zheng 65 Hao	Nizhniy Novgorod	877EKM	???	1995	14 Aug 1995		Decommissioned 2021
Iran	903	Yunes	Saint Petersburg	877EKM	5 Feb 1992	12 Jul 1994	2 Sep 1996		Active as 2011 (probably in modernization in Iranian shipyard)
India	S63	Sindhurakshak	Saint Petersburg	877EKM	16 Feb 1995	26 Jun 1997	2 Oct 1997		A munitions accident caused an explosion and fire while at berth in 2013. It was later scuttled.
India	S65	Sindhurashtra	Saint Petersburg	877EKM	12 Dec 1998	14 Oct 1999	16 May 2000		Active as of 2010

=== Project 636 ===
Operator	#	Name	Shipyard	Project	Laid down	Launched	Commissioned	Fleet	Status
China	366	Yuan Zheng 66 Hao	Saint Petersburg	636	16 Jul 1996	26 Apr 1997	26 Aug 1997		Active as of 2006
China	367	Yuan Zheng 67 Hao	Saint Petersburg	636	28 Aug 1997	18 Jun 1998	25 Oct 1998		Active as of 2006
China	368	Yuan Zheng 68 Hao	Saint Petersburg	636M	18 Oct 2002	27 May 2004	20 Oct 2004		Active as of 2006
China	369	Yuan Zheng 69 Hao	Saint Petersburg	636M	18 Oct 2002	19 Aug 2004	2005		Active as of 2006
China	370	Yuan Zheng 70 Hao	Saint Petersburg	636M	2004	May 2005	2005		Active as of 2006
China	371	Yuan Zheng 71 Hao	Saint Petersburg	636M	2004	2005	2005		Active as of 2006
China	372	Yuan Zheng 72 Hao	Saint Petersburg	636M	2005	2005	2006		Active as of 2006
China	373	Yuan Zheng 73 Hao	Nizhniy Novgorod	636M	Jul 1992	8 May 2004	5 Aug 2005		Active as of 2007
China	374	Yuan Zheng 74 Hao	Severodvinsk	636M	29 May 2003	21 May 2005	30 Dec 2005		Active as of 2006
China	375	Yuan Zheng 75 Hao	Severodvinsk	636M	29 May 2003	14 Jul 2005	30 Dec 2005		Active as of 2006
Algeria	021	Messali el Hadj	Saint Petersburg	636M	2006	20 Nov 2008	28 Aug 2009		Active
Algeria	022	Akram Pacha	Saint Petersburg	636M	2007	9 Apr 2009	29 Oct 2009		Active
Vietnam	182	Hà Nội	Saint Petersburg	636.1	25 Aug 2010	28 Aug 2012	3 Apr 2014		Active as of 2014
Vietnam	183	Hồ Chí Minh City	Saint Petersburg	636.1	28 Sep 2011	28 Dec 2012	3 Apr 2014		Active as of 2014
Vietnam	184	Hải Phòng	Saint Petersburg	636.1		Aug 2013	1 Aug 2015		Active as of 2014
Vietnam	185	Khánh Hoà	Saint Petersburg	636.1	2013	28 Mar 2014	1 Aug 2015		Active as of 2015
Vietnam	186	Đà Nẵng	Saint Petersburg	636.1		28 Dec 2014	28 Feb 2017		Active as of 2016
Vietnam	187	Bà Rịa-Vũng Tàu	Saint Petersburg	636.1	28 May 2014	28 Sep 2015	28 Feb 2017		Active as of 2017
Algeria	031	El Ouarsenis	Saint Petersburg	636.1	2015	14 Mar 2017	9 Jan 2019		Active as of 2019
Algeria	032	El Hoggar	Saint Petersburg	636.1		18 Jun 2018	9 Jan 2019		Active as of 2019

=== Project 636.3 ===
Italics indicate estimates. Russian designation Project 636.6 is known as the "Improved Kilo II" class in the West.

Operator	#	Name	Shipyard	Project	Laid down	Launched	Commissioned	Fleet	Status
Russia	B-261	Novorossiysk	Saint Petersburg	636.3	20 Aug 2010	28 Nov 2013	22 Aug 2014	BSF	Active; as of September 2025 has a serious technical problem with diesel leaking from the fuel system into the submarine.
Russia	B-237	Rostov-na-Donu	Saint Petersburg	636.3	21 Nov 2011	26 Jun 2014	30 Dec 2014	BSF	Damaged by the cruise missile strike on Sevastopol drydock on 12 Sep 2023; taken in for repair in dry dock; claimed sunk by Ukraine in a second strike in Aug 2024
Russia	B-262	Stary Oskol	Saint Petersburg	636.3	17 Aug 2012	28 Aug 2014	25 Jun 2015	BSF	Active
Russia	B-265	Krasnodar	Saint Petersburg	636.3	20 Feb 2014	25 Apr 2015	5 Nov 2015	BSF	Reported active in the Mediterranean as of 2026
Russia	B-268	Veliky Novgorod	Saint Petersburg	636.3	30 Oct 2014	18 Mar 2016	25 Oct 2016	BSF	Active
Russia	B-271	Kolpino	Saint Petersburg	636.3	30 Oct 2014	31 May 2016	24 Nov 2016	BSF	As of December 2025 highly likely docked in Port of Novorossiysk, likely significantly damaged and unable to deploy or sail of its own accord.
Russia	B-274	Petropavlovsk-Kamchatsky	Saint Petersburg	636.3	28 Jul 2017	28 Mar 2019	25 Nov 2019	PF	Active as of 2026
Russia	B-603	Volkhov	Saint Petersburg	636.3	28 Jul 2017	26 Dec 2019	24 Oct 2020	PF	Active; carried out land-attack cruise missile tests in Jan 2022
Russia	B-602	Magadan	Saint Petersburg	636.3	1 Nov 2019	26 Mar 2021	12 Oct 2021	PF	Active; deployed in the Pacific fleet late 2022
Russia	B-588	Ufa	Saint Petersburg	636.3	1 Nov 2019	31 Mar 2022	16 Nov 2022	PF	Active
Russia	B-608	Mozhaysk	Saint Petersburg	636.3	23 Aug 2021	27 Apr 2023	28 Nov 2023	PF	Active
Russia	B-???	Yakutsk	Saint Petersburg	636.3	23 Aug 2021	11 Oct 2024	11 Jun 2025	PF	Active

== See also ==
- List of Soviet and Russian submarine classes
- List of submarine classes in service

Equivalent submarines of the same era

- Harushio class
- Santa Cruz class
- Hai Lung class
- Upholder/Victoria class
- Walrus class

== Notes ==
=== Bibliography ===
- Darman, Peter, ed. (2004). Twenty-first Century Submarines and Warships. Military Handbooks. Grange Books. ISBN 1-84013-678-2.
- Gardiner, Robert; Chumbley, Stephen; Budzbon, Przemysław, eds. (1995). Conway's All the World's Fighting Ships 1947–1995. Naval Institute Press. ISBN 1-55750-132-7.
