= Land-attack missile =

Surface to surface missile for striking land

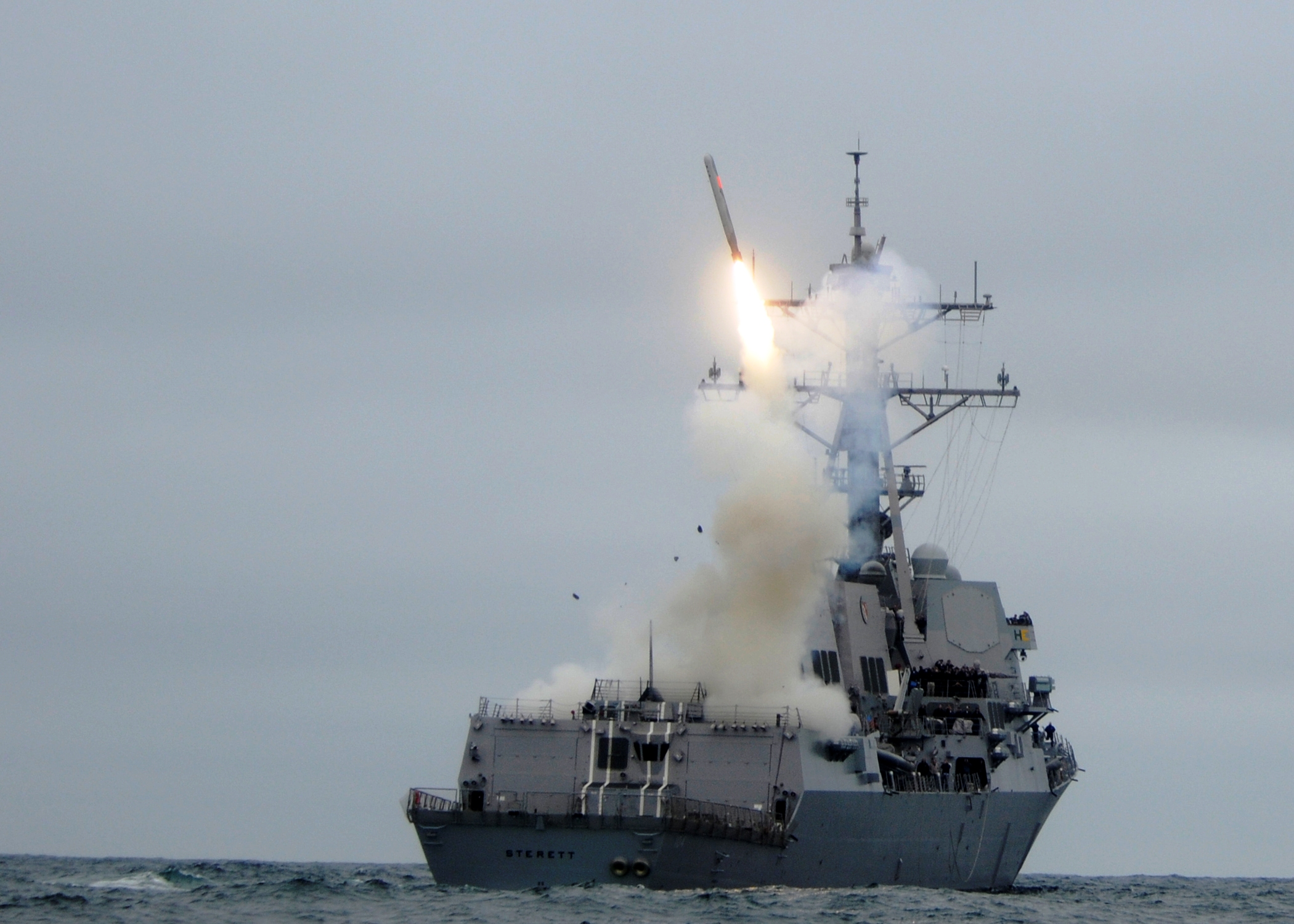
USS Sterett launching a TLAM.

A land-attack missile (LAM) is a naval surface-to-surface missile that is capable of effectively attacking targets ashore, unlike specialized anti-ship missiles, which are optimized for striking other ships. Some dual-role missiles are suitable for both missions.

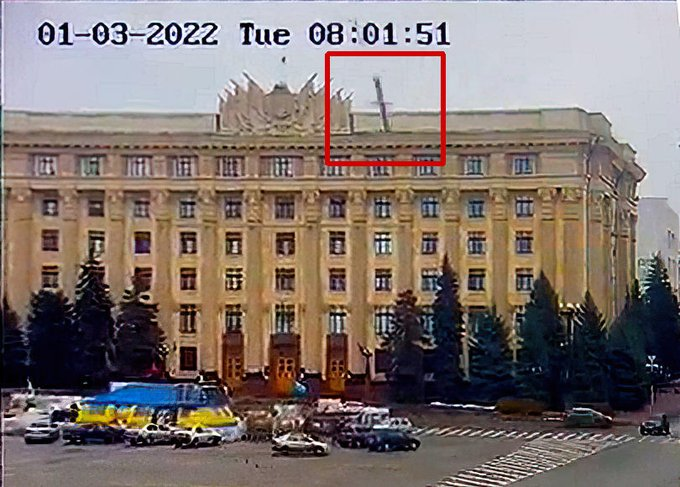
A Russian Navy-launched 3M14 Kalibr land-attack missile striking a government building in Kharkiv.

Like long-range anti-ship missiles, land-attack missiles are usually turbojet or turbofan powered cruise missiles. To prevent early detection and counter-measures, they usually fly near the ground at very low altitude, employing terrain-following techniques, either with terrain-following radar or with precise navigation system, like GPS, combined with a stored map of obstacles and ground elevation data (TERCOM).

Land-attack missiles are usually programmed before launch to follow a set of way-points up to the target. Terminal guidance can be done with active radar homing, passive radar or electronic warfare support measures, infrared homing or optical guidance, or the (fixed) target was predesignated with as final way-point.

Some missiles allow mid-course updates after launch and some may even send information back to the launch platform or other units.

== List of missiles ==
Specific types of LAMs (current, past and under development)
Name	Origin	Maximum Range
3M-51 Alfa	Russia	250 kilometres (160 mi)
3M-54 Kalibr	Russia	4,500 kilometres (2,800 mi)
3M22 Zircon	Russia	1,000 kilometres (620 mi)
BGM-109 Tomahawk	United States	1,666 kilometres (1,035 mi)
BrahMos	India / Russia	900 kilometres (560 mi) (Surface-launched version)
BrahMos-II	India / Russia	1,500 kilometres (930 mi)
CJ-10	China	1,500 kilometres (930 mi)
CJ-100	China	2,000–3,000 kilometres (1,200–1,900 mi)
Gabriel V	Israel	200 km to 400 km (124 mi – 248 mi)
Harbah	Pakistan	700 kilometres (430 mi)
Harpoon Block 1J	United States	280 kilometres (~174 mi)
Hermes (missile)	Russia	100 kilometres (62 mi)
Hongniao	China	3,000 kilometres (1,900 mi)
Hsiung Feng IIE	Taiwan	>1,200 kilometres (750 mi)
Hsiung Feng III	Taiwan	1,500 kilometres (930 mi)
Hwasal-2	North Korea	1,500–2,000 km (930–1,240 mi)
Hypersonic Air-breathing Weapon Concept	United States	>560 kilometres (350 mi)
Hyunmoo-3	South Korea	1,500 kilometres (930 mi) (Hyunmoo-3C)
Joint Strike Missile	Norway / United States	555 kilometres (345 mi)
Kh-59	Russia	550 kilometres (340 mi)
Otomat Mk/2E	Italy	360 kilometres (220 mi)
MAS	Brazil / United Arab Emirates	TBA (under development)
MdCN	France	1,400 kilometres (870 mi)
Nirbhay	India	1,500 kilometres (930 mi)
P-800 Oniks	Russia	800 kilometres (500 mi)
RBS15	Sweden	>300 kilometres (190 mi)
RK-55 / S-10	Russia	3,000 kilometres (1,900 mi)
Sea Breaker	Israel	300 kilometres (190 mi)
Wan Chien	Taiwan	300 kilometres (190 mi)
YJ-12	China	546 kilometres (339 mi)
YJ-18	China	540 kilometres (340 mi)
YJ-62	China	400 kilometres (250 mi)
Yun Feng	Taiwan	2,000 kilometres (1,200 mi)
