= India–Vietnam relations =

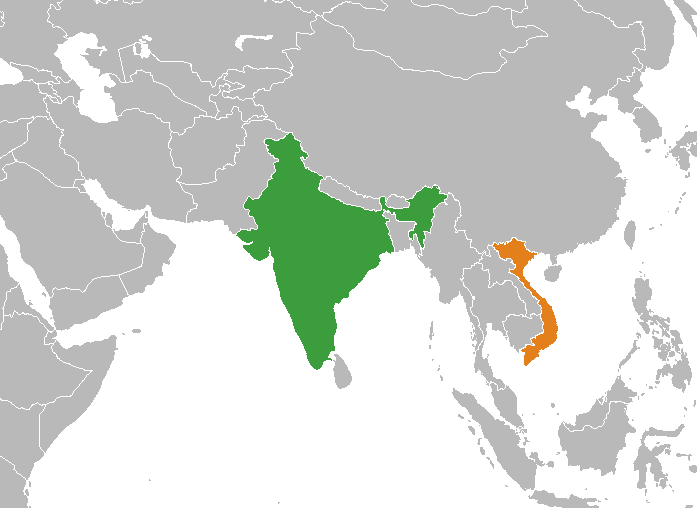
- India: Vietnam

Diplomatic mission
- Embassy of India, Hanoi: Embassy of Vietnam, New Delhi

Envoy
- Indian Ambassador to Vietnam Sandeep Arya: Vietnamese Ambassador to India Do Thanh Hai

India–Vietnam relations (Hindi: भारत-वियतनाम संबंध; Vietnamese: Quan hệ Ấn Độ – Việt Nam), also known as Indian-Vietnamese relations, are the bilateral relations of India and Vietnam.

Cultural and economic links between India and Vietnam date back to the 2nd century. In contemporary era, relations between India and Vietnam have been governed by several areas of shared political interests. India strongly condemned U.S. action during the Vietnam War and was also one of the few non-communist countries to show support for Vietnam during the Cambodian–Vietnamese War against Angkar and the Khmer Rouge of Democratic Kampuchea led by the dictator Pol Pot (Saloth Sâr) where they forced to abandon the capital Phnom Penh and fled back into the jungle near the border with Thailand which continued as a guerilla war from 1979 until 1997 at the mountain range of Dângrêk.

In 1992, India and Vietnam established extensive economic ties, including oil exploration, agriculture and manufacturing. The relations between the two countries, especially defence ties, benefited extensively from India's Look East policy. Bilateral military cooperation includes sale of military equipment, sharing of intelligence, joint naval exercises and training in counterinsurgency and jungle warfare. India also regularly deploys its warships for goodwill visits to Vietnamese seas.

Bilateral relations were upgraded to a "Strategic Partnership" during Vietnamese Prime Minister Nguyen Tan Dung's visit to India in July 2007, and upgraded to a "Comprehensive Strategic Partnership" during Indian Prime Minister Narendra Modi's visit to Vietnam in September 2016.

== Background ==
India was the Chairman of the International Commission for Supervision and Control (ICSC) which was formed to implement the 1954 Geneva Accords and facilitate the peace process in Vietnam. India supported Vietnam's independence from France, viewing it as being similar to India's own struggle against British colonialism. France had also colonized portions of India including Pondicherry, and the Government of India assumed de facto control of French India on 1 November 1954 until 16 August 1962 when it became part of the Union territory.

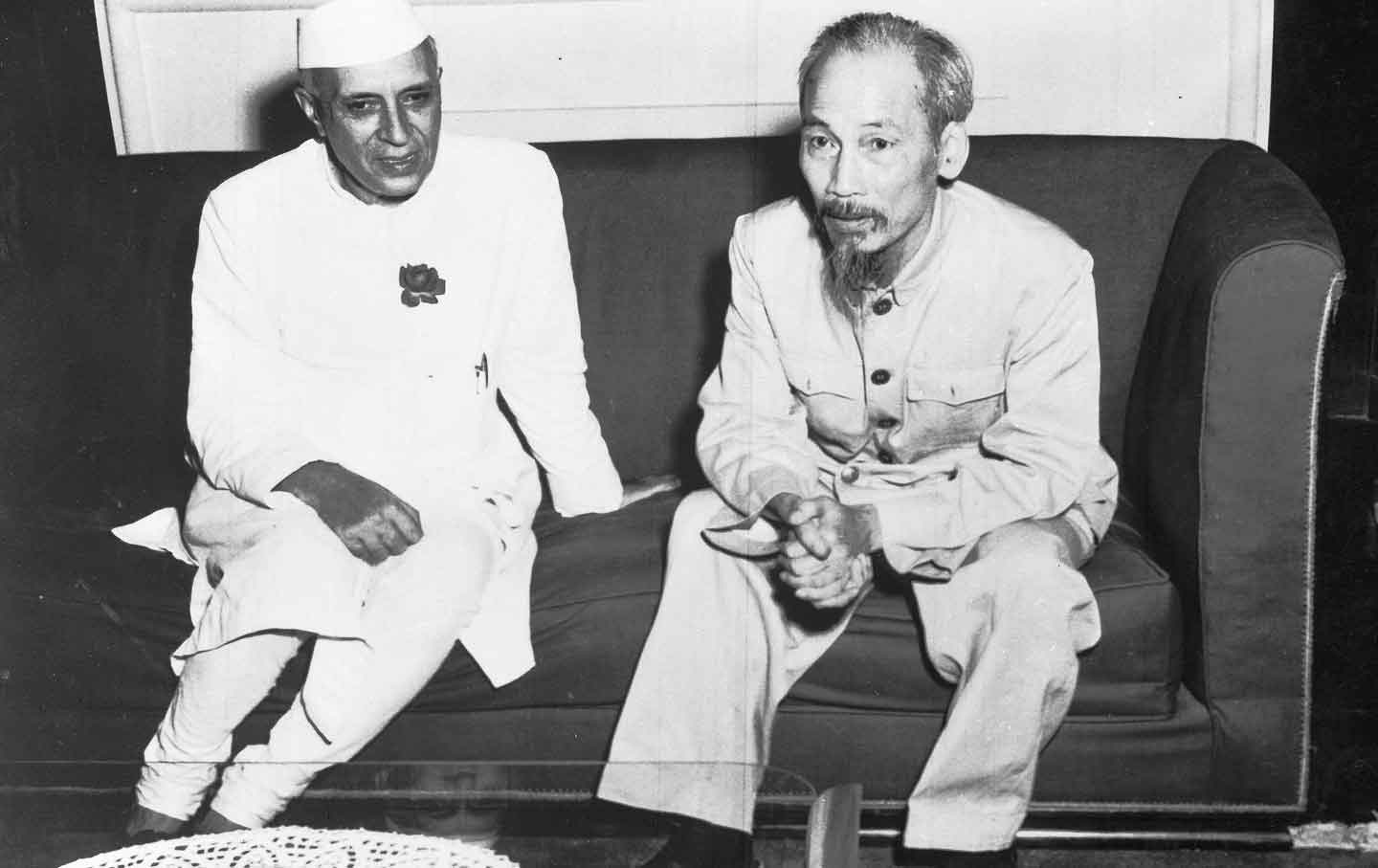
Prime Minister Jawaharlal Nehru (left) with President Ho Chi Minh (right) in Hanoi; 1954.

Indian Prime Minister Jawaharlal Nehru embarked on a tour of China and Indochina in 1954 during which he visited both North Vietnam and South Vietnam. He was one of the first visitors to North Vietnam after its victory against the French at Dien Bien Phu. Nehru sent a detailed report describing his tour to Burmese Prime Minister U Nu on 16 November 1954. Nehru wrote, "The person who impressed me most was Dr. Ho Chi Minh of the Democratic Republic of Vietnam, who came to see me at Hanoi. Hanoi had passed into his hands just five days previous to my arrival. This was a peaceful and very disciplined transfer from the French to the Viet Minh. Ho Chi Minh impressed me as an unusually frank, straight-forward and likable person. Although he has been engaged in a war for seven years against the French, he was the very reverse of a war-like person. He struck me as a man of peace and goodwill. He did not say a word against the French to me. Indeed, he expressed his desire for cooperation with the French and even to be associated with the French Union, provided his country had complete independence. He mentioned the relationship of India with the Commonwealth and asked me for further particulars about it. It was evident that Viet Minh was well-organized and disciplined."

Nehru also visited Saigon and held discussions with then-South Vietnamese Prime Minister Ngô Đình Diệm, French General Paul Ély and others at Independence Palace. In contrast to North Vietnam, Nehru was unimpressed by South Vietnamese leadership writing, "South Vietnam produced a completely opposite effect on me. The whole place seemed to be at sixes and sevens with hardly any dominant authority. The Prime Minister and his Generals were opposed to each other. There were three private armies of some kind of semi-religious sects. Foreign Representatives apparently also pulled in different directions. It was generally estimated that if there was a vote now, 90 percent or more of the population would vote for Viet Minh. What would happen a year or two later, one could not say."

Chinese Premier Zhou Enlai had asked Nehru during his visit to China whether India would recognize North and South Vietnam. Nehru noted, "I told him that for all practical purposes we were dealing with them, either through the International Commission or otherwise, as if we had recognized them. We intended sending Consuls-General to them. For the present, we did not intend going any further because of our delicate position as Chairman of the three International Commissions." Ngo Dinh Nhu, the brother and chief political advisor of South Vietnamese President Ngô Đình Diệm, visited New Delhi in March 1957 and met with Prime Minister Nehru and then-minister without portfolio V. K. Krishna Menon. President Diệm visited India in November 1957 and met with Nehru and Indian President Rajendra Prasad. North Vietnamese President Ho Chi Minh visited India in February 1958 and also met with Prime Minister Nehru and President Prasad.

India opposed American involvement in the Vietnam War. Nehru made his last state visit to the United States in November 1961. During a private luncheon at Hammersmith Farm, US President John F. Kennedy and US Ambassador to India John Kenneth Galbraith questioned Nehru on how they could avoid American militarization of Vietnam. Nehru remained ambiguous on Vietnam but emphasized that "the United States must stay out". According to his nephew and then-Indian Ambassador to the US Braj Kumar Nehru, the Prime Minister later told Foreign Secretary M. J. Desai, "Tell them, tell them not to go into Vietnam. They will be bogged down and they will never be able to get out."

President Rajendra Prasad visited North Vietnam in 1959. Prasad met with Ho Chi Minh and gifted him a bodhi tree (ficus religiosa) which they planted at the Tran Quoc Pagoda, the oldest Buddhist temple in Hanoi. It is the first bodhi tree in Vietnam, and has since become a symbol of friendship between the two countries. On 22 December 2019, the Buddhist Sangha of Vietnam and the Embassy of India in Hanoi held a ceremony to mark the 60th anniversary of the tree's planting. During Indian President Pranab Mukherjee's visit to Vietnam in September 2014 he gifted a second bodhi tree to President Truong Tan Sang which they planted at the Presidential Palace in Hanoi.

India established diplomatic relations with North Vietnam on 7 January 1972, a year before the US withdrawal from Vietnam and three years before the Fall of Saigon. India supported the reunification of Vietnam and the two countries have maintained friendly relations, especially in wake of Vietnam's disputes with China, with whom India also has disputes.

== High level visits ==
There have been several high level visits between leaders of the two countries.

Secretary General of the Communist Party of Vietnam Nong Duc Manh visited India in 2005. Prime Minister Nguyen Tan Dung visited in 2007, and Vice-president Nguyen Thi Doan visited in 2009. Chairman of the National Assembly of Vietnam Nguyen Phu Trong visited in 2010 and President Truong Tan Sang in October 2011. Prime Minister Nguyen Tan Dung visited in December 2012 to participate in the India-ASEAN Commemorative Summit. General Secretary of the Communist Party of Vietnam Nguyen Phu Trong made a state visit on 19–22 November 2013 and Prime Minister Nguyen Tan Dung on 27–28 October 2014. Prime Minister Nguyen Xuan Phuc visited India on 24–26 January 2018 and was the chief guest and the Republic Day parade. He also attended the ASEAN-India Commemorative Summit 2018. President Tran Dai Quang made a state visit to India on 2–4 March 2018.

Indian Prime Minister Atal Behari Vajpayee made an official visit to Vietnam in 2001. Lok Sabha Speaker Somnath Chatterjee visited in March 2007, and President Pratibha Patil in November 2008. Prime Minister Manmohan Singh visited Vietnam in October 2010 to attend the 8th ASEAN-India Summit and the 5th East Asia Summit. Lok Sabha Speaker Meira Kumar visited the country in May 2011. Vice President M. Hamid Ansari visited Vietnam on 14–17 January 2013 to attend the closing ceremony of the "India-Vietnam Friendship Year 2012". 2012. President Pranab Mukherjee made a state visit to Vietnam on 14–17 September 2014. Foreign Minister Sushma Swaraj visited Vietnam on 26–28 August 2018 to attend the 16th India-Vietnam Joint Commission Meeting and the 3rd Indian Ocean Conference. Prime Minister Narendra Modi made an official visit to Vietnam on 2–3 September 2016. Vice President M. Venkaiah Naidu visited the country on 9–12 May 2019 to attend Vesak festivities. President Ram Nath Kovind made a state visit to Vietnam on 18–20 November 2018.

Due to the COVID-19 pandemic, several high level meetings were held virtually by the two countries in 2020. The 17th Virtual Joint Commission Meeting between Indian Foreign Minister S. Jaishankar, and Deputy Prime Minister and Vietnam Foreign Minister Pham Binh Minh was held on 25 August 2020. A virtual bilateral defence meeting was held between Defence Ministers Rajnath Singh and General Ngô Xuân Lịch on 27 November 2020. The first-ever India-Vietnam Virtual Summit was co-chaired by Indian Prime Minister Narendra Modi and Vietnam Prime Minister Nguyen Xuan Phuc on 21 December 2020.

In May 2026, Vietnamese present Tô Lâm visited India for several days to deepen bilateral relations. The two nations officially elevated their relationship to an Enhanced Comprehensive Strategic Partnership in 2026, with new agreements to prioritize maritime security and defense capacity building over shared concern in the South China Sea. Beyond defense, the summit also resulted in a wide range of pacts in the technology, finance, and energy sectors to integrate India's Act East policy more closely with Vietnam's autonomy goals. Vietnam and India signed cooperation agreements to integrate Vietnamese manufacturing with Indian semiconductor design and engineering, a memorandum of understanding to explore cross-border payment systems and fintech collaboration, and pacts to share technical expertise in green hydrogen production and solar infrastructure.

== Economic relations ==
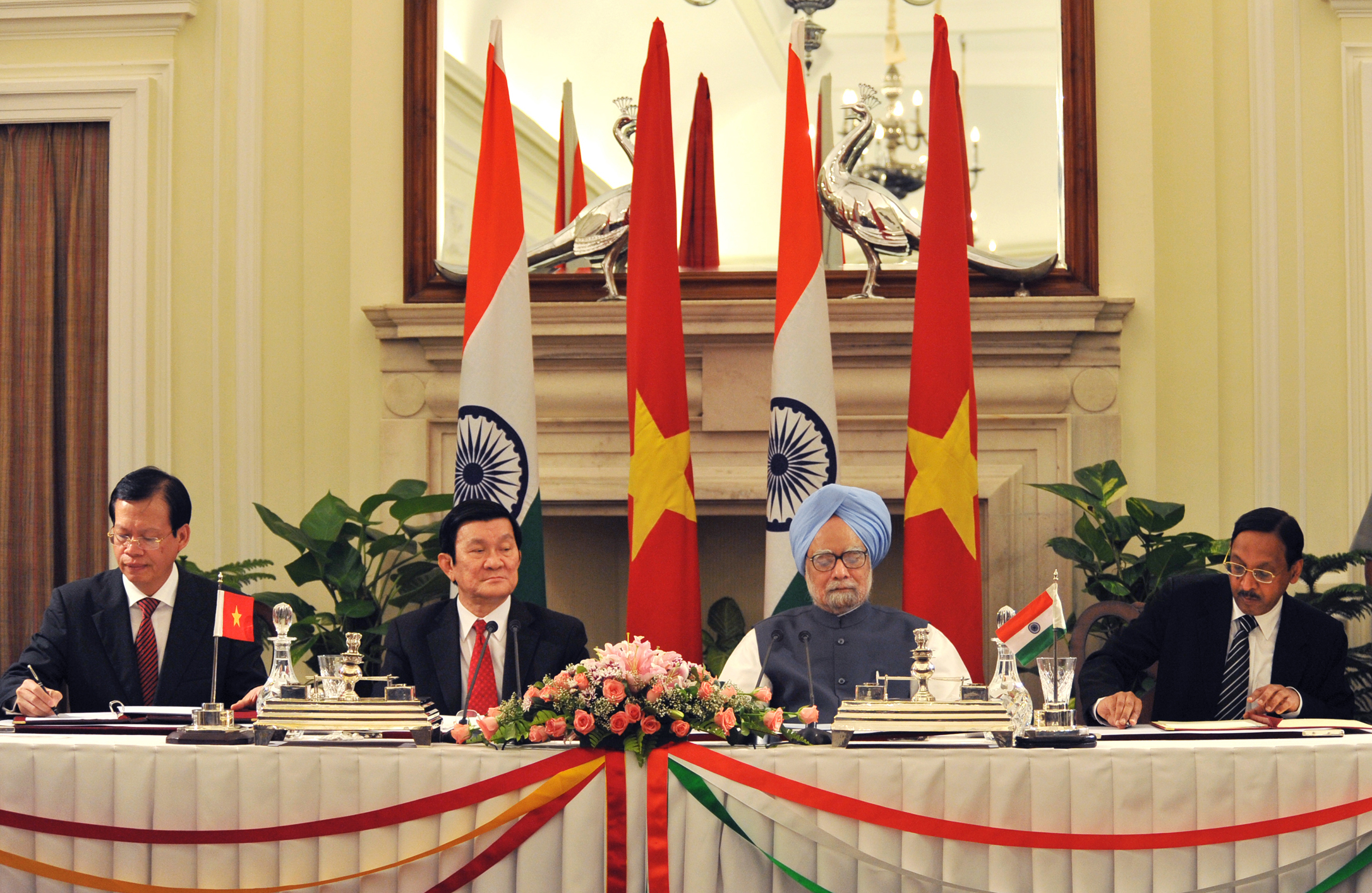
Bilateral signing ceremony in 2011

India granted "Most Favoured Nation" status to Vietnam in 1975 and both nations signed a bilateral trade agreement in 1978 and the Bilateral Investment Promotion and Protection Agreement (BIPPA) on 8 March 1997. The Indo-Vietnam Joint Business Council has worked to promote trade and investment since 1993. In 2003, both nations promulgated a Joint Declaration on Comprehensive Cooperation when the General Secretary of the Communist Party of Vietnam Nông Đức Mạnh visited India and both nations are negotiating a free trade agreement. In 2007, a fresh joint declaration was issued during the state visit of the Prime Minister of Vietnam Nguyễn Tấn Dũng. The ASEAN–India Free Trade Agreement came into effect on 1 January 2010.

India and Vietnam have also expanded cooperation in information technology, education and collaboration of the respective national space programmes. Direct air links and simplified visa regulations have been established to bolster tourism.

=== Trade ===
India is Vietnam's 10th largest trading partner, while Vietnam is India's 15th largest trading partner and 4th largest in ASEAN after Singapore, Indonesia and Malaysia. Bilateral trade between India and Vietnam measured $11.12 billion in 2020–21, declining by 22.47% from the previous fiscal largely due to disruptions caused by the COVID-19 pandemic. India exported $4.99 billion worth of goods to Vietnam, and imported $6.12 billion from Vietnam. India's trade deficit with Vietnam declined from $2.22 billion in 2019–20 to $1.12 billion in 2020–21.

Bilateral trade has increased rapidly since the liberalisation of the economies of both Vietnam and India. Trade between the two countries totaled US$200 million in 2000, and quickly grew over the next two decades to reach a peak of US$12.3 billion in 2019–20. India had become the 13th largest exporter to Vietnam by the early 2000s, with exports growing steadily from $11.5 million in 1985–86 to $395.68 million in January–November 2003. Vietnam's exports to India amounted to around $53 million in 2002. Between 2001 and 2006, the volume of bilateral trade expanded at 20-30% per annum to reach US$1 billion by 2006. The ASEAN-India Free Trade Agreement came into effect in 2010, and bilateral trade exploded to US$3.917 billion by November 2012, with Vietnam exporting $1.7 billion to India in 2012, an increase of 56.5% from 2011. In 2023, a delegation of IETO visited Vietnam to attend the Horasis conference in Binh Duong. IETO delegation, led by consul general of India in Vietnam, Madan Mohan Sethi, was also invited by the Dak Lak Province.

=== Investment ===
According to Vietnam's Foreign Investment Agency, India had 299 active projects in Vietnam with a total invested capital of $909.5 million making India the 26th largest foreign direct investor in Vietnam as of April 2021. When including investments made by Indian citizens and corporations located outside of India and routed through third countries, India had an estimated total investment of $1.9 billion in Vietnam as of June 2021. The main industries India has investments in include energy, mineral exploration, agro-processing, sugar, tea, coffee manufacturing, agro-chemicals, information technology and auto components. Vietnam had 6 active projects in India with a total estimated investment of $28.55 million as of 2020. Vietnam's investments in India have primarily been in pharmaceuticals, information technology, chemicals and building materials.

Bharat Heavy Electricals Limited was awarded a $50 million contract to construct the Nam Chien Hydro Power project in the Muong La district in the Son La province in 2008. BHEL commissioned the project on 30 January 2013. In November 2013, Tata Power was awarded a $1.8 billion contract to build the 1,200 MW Long Phu 2 supercritical coal-fired thermal power project in the Sóc Trăng Province. In November 2017, the company was awarded a $54 million contract to build a 49 MW plant in Loc Tan commune, Loc Ninh district. Adani Green Energy and Suzlon Energy are also exploring investment opportunities in Vietnam.

In July 2021, the Vietnamese Embassy organized a trade and investment promotion session in Hyderabad for the Indian pharmaceutical industry with the goal a building a $500 million pharmaceutical park in Vietnam.

=== Oil exploration ===
ONGC Videsh, the international subsidiary of Indian government-owned Oil and Natural Gas Corporation (ONGC), began operating in Vietnam in 1988 when it was awarded an exploration licence for Block 6.1. Block 6.1 is spread over a 955 km^{2} area in the Nam Con Son Basin of the South China Sea and has two producing fields - Lan Tay and Lan Rosneft. ONGC Videsh owns a 45% in Block 6.1 and its share of condensate and oil equivalent gas production from the block was 1.33 million tonnes in 2020–21. Russia's Rosneft holds a 35% stake and the remaining 20% is held by Petrovietnam. ONGC Videsh was awarded exploration licences for Block-127 and Block-128 in May 2006, which became effective on 16 June 2006. ONGC relinquished its rights to Block-127 a few years later due to poor prospects but continued drilling in Block-128. Block-128 is a deepwater exploratory block spread over an area of 7,058 square kilometers in the Phu Khanh basin of the South China Sea. In March 2008, Essar Exploration & Production, Mauritius, a subsidiary of Essar Oil, was awarded a 50% stake in Block 114 spread over an area of 5,925 km^{2} in Song Hong basin. China did not raise any objections at the time the blocks were awarded.

In September 2011, China warned India not to cooperate with Vietnam in oil exploration, referring to such exploration as "illegal and invalid" and a violation of China's sovereignty. Chinese Foreign Ministry spokesperson Jiang Yu stated, "Our consistent position is that we are opposed to any country engaging in oil and gas exploration and development activities in waters under China's jurisdiction". She also stressed that China enjoyed "indisputable sovereignty" over the South China Sea and its islands. China's official state-run press agency Xinhua published an article accusing India of "aggressive moves", and claiming that "efforts by Vietnam to draw in India, and the Philippines to draw in Japan, would have little impact since all of these states together can hardly match China in the regional strength and influence, let alone counterbalance and contain China as they expected." The Indo-Vietnamese deal was also denounced by the Chinese state-run newspaper Global Times. On 15 September 2011, Indian Foreign Ministry spokesperson Vishnu Prakash dismissed China's objections and stated that India's cooperation with Vietnam was "per international laws, norms, and conventions". Prakash reiterated that "India supports freedom of navigation in the South China Sea and hopes that all parties to the dispute would abide by the 2002 declaration of conduct in the South China Sea."

Despite Chinese threats, on 12 October 2011, ONGC Videsh announced that it had signed a three-year deal with Petrovietnam for developing long-term cooperation in the oil sector which includes new investments and strengthening presence from drilling-to-dispensing in Vietnam, India, and other countries. An Indian Foreign Ministry spokesperson supported Vietnam's claim to sovereignty stating, "The Chinese had concerns but we are going by what the Vietnamese authorities have told us and have conveyed this to the Chinese." Essar, and its partner Eni, announced in July 2019 that it had discovered natural gas and condensate in Block 114 in the Song Hong basin. Reaffirming Vietnam's continued interest in cooperation with India, Vietnam's Ambassador Pham Sanh Chau stated in December 2020, "Essar has expressed interest in scaling up their investment project in Vietnam to $11 billion. If that happenens, the project will be the single biggest investment by an Indian company in Vietnam. We are looking forward to their decision and are very optimistic about it."

ONGC Videsh has not yet found oil in Block-128, but continues to hold the exploration licence. The company has repeatedly sought and been granted extensions of its exploration licence. ONGC applied for its seventh extension in September 2021. ONGC continues to maintain its licence in Block 128 because India wants to maintain its strategic interest in the South China Sea, while Vietnam continues to grant extensions because it wants an Indian presence to counter-balance Chinese claims in the disputed region.

== Strategic cooperation ==
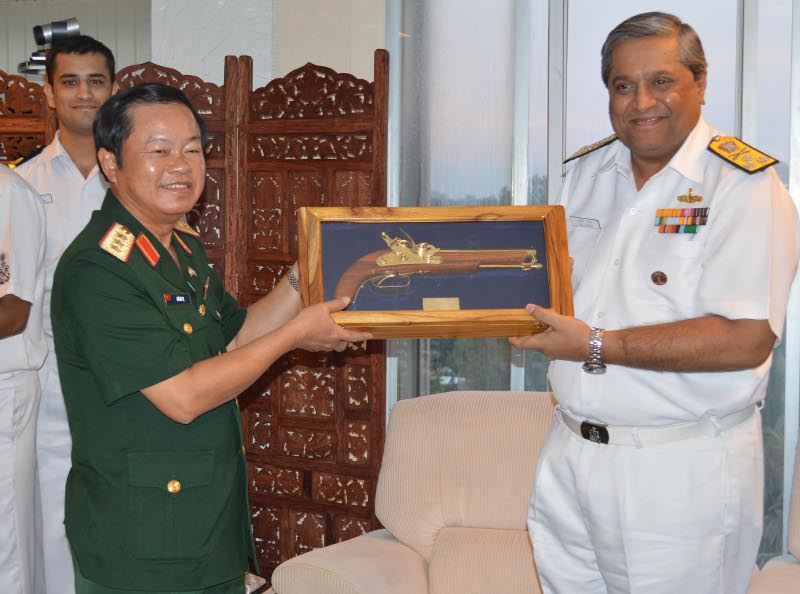
Vietnamese Vice Minister of Defence visits the Indian Navy's Eastern Naval Command.

Due to COVID-19, the 17th Joint Commission Meeting was held virtually on 25 August 2020. The India-Vietnam Joint Working Group on Educational Exchange was established in 2012, and the India-Vietnam Joint Sub-Commission on Trade (Commerce Secretary-level) was set up in November 2013. The two countries also hold an annual Security Dialogue at the Defence Secretary Level and a Joint Committee on Science and Technology that meets periodically.

India and Vietnam are both members of the Mekong–Ganga Cooperation, created to develop and enhance close ties between India and nations of Southeast Asia. Vietnam has supported India's bid to become a permanent member of the U.N. Security Council and join the Asia-Pacific Economic Cooperation (APEC). In the 2003 joint declaration, India and Vietnam envisaged creating an "Arc of Advantage and Prosperity" in Southeast Asia; to this end, Vietnam has backed increasing the significance of the relationship between India and the Association of Southeast Asian Nations (ASEAN) and its negotiation of an Indo-ASEAN free trade agreement. India and Vietnam have also built strategic partnerships, including extensive cooperation on developing nuclear power, enhancing regional security and fighting terrorism, transnational crime and drug trafficking.

=== Defence cooperation ===
In January 2000, the Indian Defence Minister, George Fernandes, called for a renewed political relationship with Vietnam, describing Vietnam as India's most trusted friend and ally. He proposed that India should develop a naval presence in the South China Sea through access to the Cam Ranh Bay naval and air base and that India should provide training and advanced weapons to Vietnam. Vietnam has welcomed Indian Navy ships in their region which would enhance India and Vietnam military relations. Vietnam has also welcomed Indian support for a peaceful resolution of the territorial disputes in the South China Sea. Indian Foreign Minister Salman Khurshid has called Vietnam one of the pillars of India's "Look East" policy. In 2018, India and Vietnam are scheduled to conduct their first bilateral naval exercise together, in Vietnamese waters.

The Indian Navy provided training to over 550 Vietnamese Navy submariners to operate Kilo-class submarines at its INS Satavahana submarine training base. Vietnam acquired its first Kilo-class submarine from Russia in January 2014, and India had experience operating the class since the mid-1980s. In December 2016, India agreed train to Vietnamese pilots to fly Sukhoi aircraft. India provided a $100 million line of credit to Vietnam on 15 September 2014, that allows Vietnam to buy defence equipment from India. The deal will equip the Vietnam Border Guard with 12 offshore patrol vessels from Larsen & Toubro (L&T). Five ships will be built at L&T's shipyard in Chennai, while the other 7 will be built at Hai Phong under L&T's supervision. During his visit to Vietnam, on 2 September 2016, India's Prime Minister Narendra Modi offered a new US$500 million line of credit for procurement of defence equipment. Vietnam and India signed an agreement on cooperation in United Nations peacekeeping operations in 2016. The Indian Army sent a mobile training team to Vietnam in December 2017 to conduct the first training sessions.

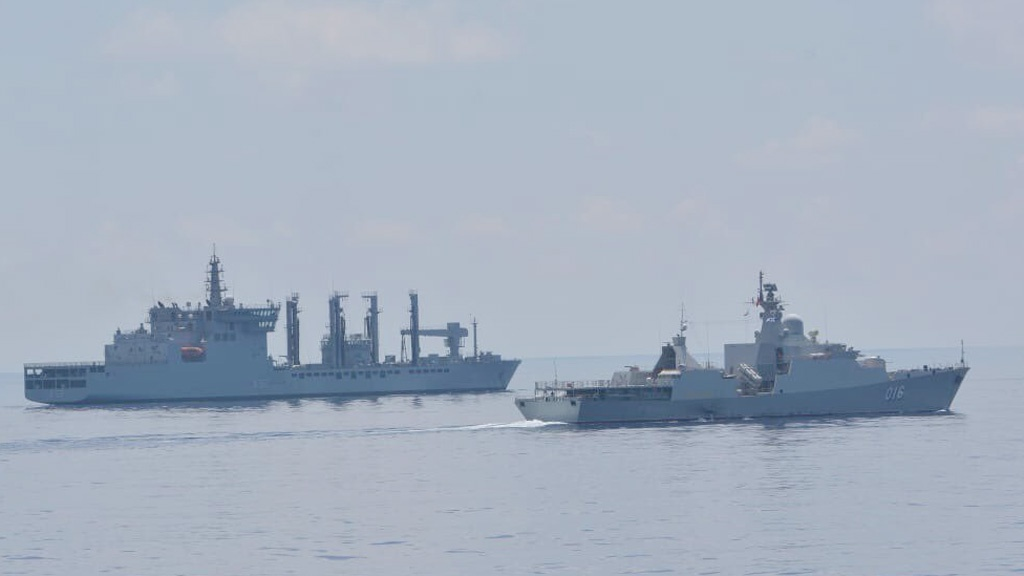
Ships of Indian Navy and Vietnam People's Navy were having bilateral maritime exercise in 2018.

In January 2016, India said it would establish a satellite tracking and imaging centre near Ho Chi Minh City for intelligence gathering to keep an eye on China. The centre was funded and built by the Indian Space Research Organisation (ISRO) at an estimated cost of $23 million. The facility enables ISRO to track and receive data from satellites launched from India, and gives Vietnam access to images from Indian earth observation satellites that cover China and the South China Sea. Vietnam had long sought access to advanced intelligence, surveillance and reconnaissance technologies in the disputed region. The facility was activated in 2018, and is linked up with ISRO's other Southeast Asian stations in Biak, Indonesia and Brunei.

Vietnam's Ambassador to India Pham Sanh Chau met Indian Foreign Secretary Harsh Vardhan Shringla on 22 August 2020 to brief him on the escalating situation in the South China Sea. The topic of the deployment of missiles was also reportedly discussed in virtual meeting between Indian Foreign Minister S. Jaishankar, and Deputy Prime Minister and Vietnam Foreign Minister Pham Binh Minh on 25 August 2020. Huynh Tam Sang of the Vietnam National University-Ho Chi Minh City noted, "India and Vietnam now find themselves at a geostrategic convergence. Both sides oppose China treating the South China Sea as its backyard and have interests in preserving peace and stability in the contested waters."

In August 2021, the Indian Navy's Eastern Fleet dispatched a task force of four warships on a two-month long operational deployment to Southeast Asia, the South China Sea and the Western Pacific Ocean. Two ships, guided-missile destroyer INS Ranvijay (D55) and anti-submarine corvette INS Kora (P61), arrived at Cam Ranh on 15 August. They conducted surface warfare exercises, weapon firing drills and helicopter operations with Vietnamese Navy frigate Ly Thai To (HQ-012). The task force also conducted bilateral exercises with the navies of the Philippines, Singapore (SIMBEX), Indonesia and Australia, before proceeding to Guam for Malabar 2021 with the Quad nations.

==== 2026 BrahMos missile deal ====
On 30 May 2026, India announced that it had signed a deal with Vietnam to supply BrahMos supersonic cruise missiles, jointly developed by India and Russia. India's Defense Secretary Rajesh Kumar Singh also confirmed that a similar deal with Indonesia was in its "final stages".

== Development assistance ==
Since 1976, India has provided development assistance to Vietnam through lines of credit (LoC) on concessional terms and conditions. Between 1976 and 2016, India provided Vietnam with 18 lines of credit worth a combined total of $364.5 million.

The 16th LoC worth $45 million was provided for the construction of the Nam Chien hydropower project, which was completed by BHEL in January 2013. The contract for the 17th LOC of $19.5 million for the construction of the Nam Trai-IV Hydropower project and the Binh Bo pumping station was signed on 11 July 2013. The Binh Bo project was completed by Kirloskar. However, there were no bidders for the Nam Trai-IV project. The 18th LOC worth $100 million was provided on 15 September 2014 for defence procurement. The deal will equip the Vietnam Border Guard with 12 offshore patrol vessels from Larsen & Toubro (L&T).

=== Humanitarian aid and other assistance ===
India also provides assistance to Vietnam through the ASEAN framework and the Mekong Ganga Cooperation (MGC) framework. Under the MGC framework, India announced a Revolving Fund to which it would contribute $1 million annually and will be used to fund Quick Impact Projects (QIPs) in Vietnam. QIPs are projects with a short-gestation period, valued at an average of $50,000 each, that aim to quickly develop community infrastructure and provide direct benefits to Vietnamese communities. India has completed 18 QIPs across 17 provinces of Vietnam since 2017. A further 8 projects were under implementation across 5 provinces in the 2020-21 fiscal year.

India established the Vietnam-India Centre for English Language & IT Training at the Technical University in Nha Trang. The Vietnam-India Entrepreneurship Development Centre was set up in Hanoi in May 2006 and the Vietnam-India Center for English Language Training was established at Danang in July 2007. India spent $2 million to establish the Advanced Resource Centre in Information and Communications Technology (ARC-ICT) at cost of $2 million in Hanoi. It was inaugurated by Indian Foreign Minister in September 2011. The centre is run by the Centre for Development of Advanced Computing (CDAC) and trains students and Vietnamese Government officials in various technical skills such as web designing, network systems, Java, GIS applications and e-governance. India gifted Vietnam a PARAM supercomputer which was installed at the Hanoi University of Science and Technology (HUST) on 12 November 2013. In November 2013, India agreed to fund the establishment of a Hi-Tech Crime Laboratory in Hanoi.

IBSA (India, Brazil, South Africa) contributed $529,000 to fund a rice seed improvement project in Danang which was completed in October 2014. A second IBSA funded project to provide medical training and e-learning at Haiphong Medical University was inaugurated in January 2015. The Government of India, through the Initiative for ASEAN Integration, funded the construction of several primary/kindergarten schools and hostels for children in remote areas of Vietnam in 2016–17. The Embassy of India in Hanoi set up artificial limb (Jaipur foot) fitment camps in 4 provinces where 1,000 Vietnamese people received artificial limbs in 2018–19. Indian Navy corvette INS Kiltan arrived at the Nha Rong port of Ho Chi Minh City in December 2020 carrying 15 tonnes of humanitarian relief supplies for people affected by floods in central Vietnam.

In May 2021, Vietnam donated $1.5 million worth of relief supplies to help India fight the COVID-19 pandemic. The first shipment of 109 ventilators and 50 oxygen generators which was delivered to Indira Gandhi International Airport. The second shipment of 100 ventilators, 275 oxygen generators, 1,300 oxygen cylinders and 50,000 protective masks was transported by the Indian Navy from Ho Chi Minh City to Chennai, Tamil Nadu. The Buddhist Sangha of Vietnam was also active in fundraising efforts, and the organization donated medical supplies worth VND 15.8 billion (US$695,335) to the Embassy of India in Hanoi and the Consulate General in Ho Chi Minh City. Landing ship tank INS Airavat arrived in Ho Chi Minh City, the epicentre of Vietnam's fourth COVID-19 pandemic wave, on 30 August 2021 carrying 100 metric tons of liquid medical oxygen in ISO containers and 300 oxygen concentrators of 10 liters per minute capacity, as requested by the Vietnamese government, to help the country fight COVID-19.

== Diplomatic missions ==
=== Of Vietnam ===
- New Delhi (Embassy)
- Mumbai (Consulate)
- Bengaluru (Consulate)

=== Of India ===
- Ho Chi Minh City (Consulate General)
- Hanoi (Embassy)

The Embassy of India in Hanoi is the diplomatic mission of the Republic of India to Vietnam.

Embassy of India, Hanoi
- Location: Hanoi, Vietnam
- Address: 63, Tran Hung Dao Street, Hoan Kiem Distt, Hanoi
- Ambassador: Sandeep Arya
- Jurisdiction: Vietnam
- Website: Indian Embassy, Hanoi

== Indian ambassadors in Vietnam ==
Sandeep Arya is the current Indian ambassador to Vietnam. Ambassador reports to the Ministry of External Affairs.

Previous ambassadors of India to Vietnam
Sr. No.	Name	Tenure
1	Sisir Gupta	December 1972-July 1975
2	C.R. Gharekhan	August 1975-January 1977
3	M.R. Sivaramakrishnan	February 1977-October 1979
4	G. Raj	November 1979-October 1981
5	Kuldip Sahdev	November 1981-January 1985
6	Pushkar Johari	January 1985-May 1988
7	A.B. Patwardhan	June 1988-December 1988
8	J.C. Sharma	March 1989-August 1992
9	S.L. Malik	August 1992-December 1996
10	Aftab Seth	January 1997-September 2000
11	Saurabh Kumar	October 2000-August 2003
12	N. Ravi	January 2004-January 2006
13	Lal T. Muana	December 2006-June 2010
14	Ranjit Rae	June 2010-August 2013
15	Preeti Saran	September 2013-February 2016
16	Parvathaneni Harish	April 2016-June 2019

== India Culture Centre ==
Indian embassy operates Indian Council for Cultural Relations's Swami Vivekananda Cultural Centre (SVCC) in Hanoi. Culture centre was established in 2017. The centre regularly conducts various events activities to promote cultural exchange between India and Vietnam.

== Cultural relations ==
India and Vietnam signed a cultural agreement in 1976.

The Swami Vivekananda Indian Cultural Centre was established in Hanoi in September 2016. It was formally inaugurated on 20 April 2017 by Indian Minister of State for External Affair V.K. Singh and the Vietnamese Deputy Minister of Culture, Sports and Tourism.

The Institute of Indian and South-West Asian Studies under the aegis of the Vietnam Academy of Social Sciences was inaugurated in Hanoi on 7 January 2012. The Centre for Indian Studies was established at the Ho Chi Minh National Academy of Politics in September 2014. It was inaugurated by Indian President Pranab Mukherjee and Vietnamese President. The Department of South East Asian Studies of the University of Social Sciences and Humanities of Vietnam, has a section on Indian Studies. An MoU for cooperation in youth affairs and establishing a youth exchange program was signed the Ministry of Youth Affairs and Sports and the Ho Chi Minh Communist Youth Union of Vietnam in September 2014. The first Vietnamese youth delegation under the program visited India from 27 March to 5 April 2017, and the Indian youth delegation visited Vietnam on 21–28 July 2017. Since 2017, there has been a regular exchange of visits by youth delegations.

A "Festival of India" was held in the cities of Hanoi, Danang and Ho Chi Minh City on 5–15 March 2014. It featured classical dance recital by the Sangeet Natak Academy, a Buddhist festival by the Central Institute of Himalayan Cultural Studies, a food festival, folk dance by Kalbelia Group, mehendi, and yoga. A 12-member dance troupe from Bollywood dance group Dance Era, sponsored by the ICCR, visited Vietnam on 25–29 June 2014 and performed in Hanoi, Phu Tho and Yen Bai. The first International Day of Yoga was observed in Vietnam on 21 June 2015, and was attended by over 5,000 people including some government officials. It has since been observed annually. An India-Vietnam Friendship painting competition was held by the Ho Chi Minh City Union of Friendship Organisation in August 2015. A fashion show by designer Le Sy Hoang on the Áo dài-Saree (Vietnamese and Indian dress) was held on 16 October 2015 at the War Remnant Museum. The University of Social Sciences and Humanities and Ho Chi Minh Union of Friendship Organisation organized a Hindi Day celebration.

The first ever Indian film festival in Vietnam was held in the cities of Danang, Hanoi and Ho Chi Minh City on 12–23 December 2015. Eight Hindi films were screened with Vietnamese subtitles, and the festival was attended by Vietnamese film industry personalities and 11 Indian film producers and directors. India was one of the partner countries at the 2016 Hanoi International Film Festival. The Directorate of Film Festival, New Delhi provided four Indian films to be screened at the Festival. Several other Indian films were also screened at the festival. A roundtable discussion on Indian cinema was held in Hanoi on 3 November. Among the panelists were Indo-Vietnamese Peter Hein, Malayalam film director Adoor Gopalakrishnan, Indian film critic Aruna Vasudev, and the Indian Ambassador to Vietnam. Under the Action Plan for 2017–20 to operationalise the Comprehensive Strategic Partnership between the two countries, the Indian government will collaborate with select Indian educational institutes to organize Vietnamese language courses and to promote Vietnamese culture in India.

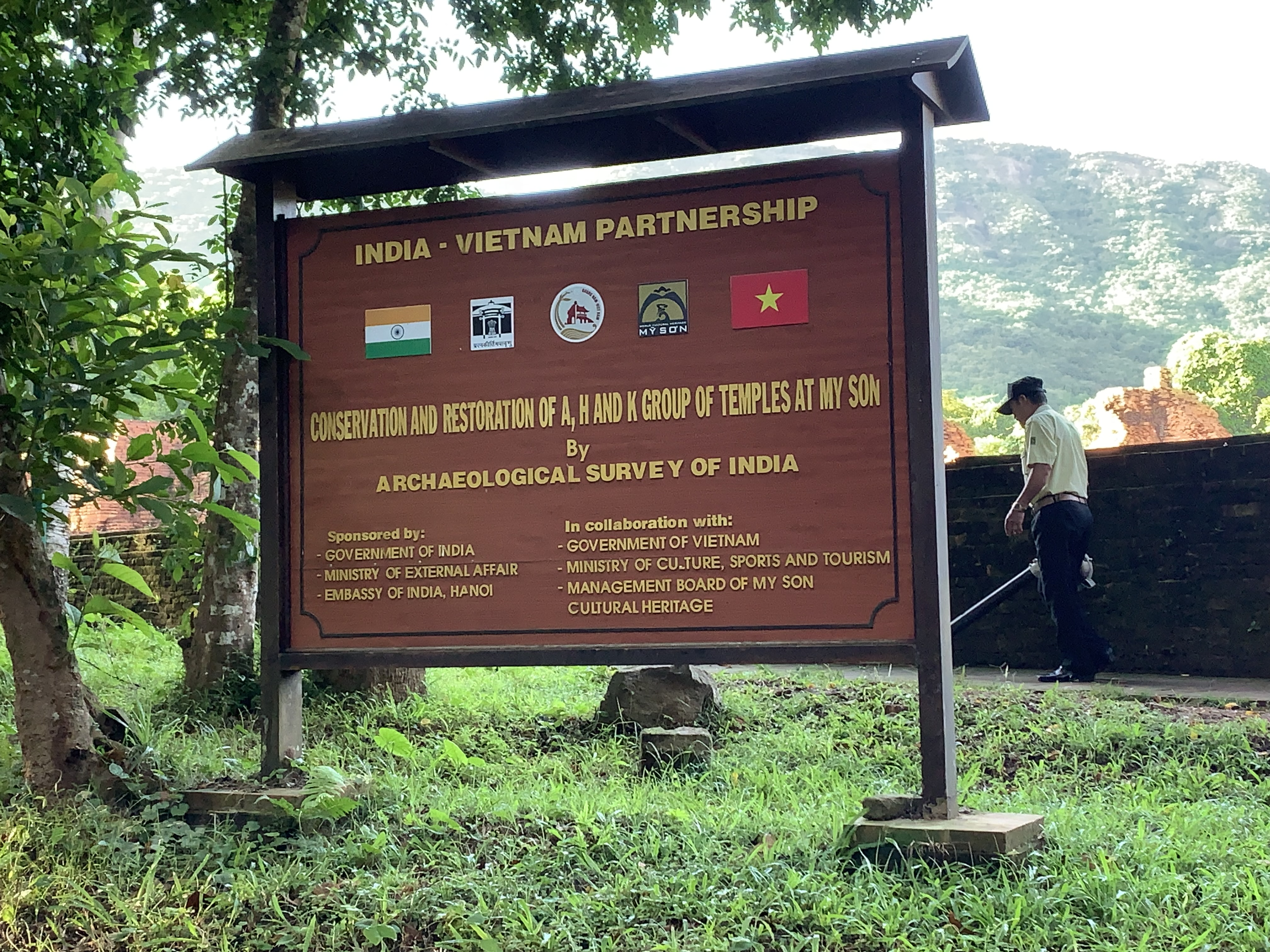
A board in the Mỹ Sơn complex noting the Archaeological Survey of India's roles in renovation of the site

India via Archaeological Survey of India (ASI) has supported Vietnam in conservation and restoration of the UNESCO World Heritage Site of Mỹ Sơn under India's Ministry of External Affairs. An official memorandum of understanding was signed between the Government of India and Government of Vietnam on 28 October 2014.

Former Indian Defence Minister George Fernandes, who visited Vietnam in March 2000, was a self-described admirer of Vietnam and its people. Addressing the annual conference of Karnataka Planters' Association in 2004, Fernandes remarked, "If there is a rebirth, I would like to be born as a Vietnamese. They are ready to die for their commitment." He noted that 3 million Vietnamese had been killed in conflicts with France, the United States and China, but had managed to recover from the devastation of war.

=== Tourism ===
Around 169,000 Indians visited Vietnam and over 31,000 Vietnamese visited India in 2019, recording a growth of 28% and 32% over 2018 respectively. India is a favored spiritual destination for many Vietnamese because it is home to many famous Buddhist temples, including the Mahabodhi Temple in Bodh Gaya where the Buddha is said to have attained enlightenment.

India introduced the e-visa facility for Vietnamese citizens in November 2014. Vietnam extended e-visas to Indian citizens in December 2017. The first scheduled non-stop direct flights between India and Vietnam began on 3 October 2019, when Indian low-cost airline IndiGo commenced daily services between Kolkata and Hanoi, followed by services between Kolkata and Ho Chi Minh City later that month. Vietnamese airline Vietjet Air commenced scheduled non-stop direct flights from Hanoi and Ho Chi Minh City to New Delhi in December 2019. Vietnam's Ambassador to India, Pham Sanh Chau, said that long flight times, inconvenient routes and high costs had been the major hindrances preventing Indian tourists from traveling to Vietnam. Chau added, "The launch of direct flights is a great opportunity to promote bilateral tourism in the context of Vietnam looking for ways to reduce heavy dependence on Chinese tourists."

The ASEAN-India Year of Tourism took place in 2019. Minister of State (Independent Charge) for Tourism K. J. Alphonse visited Vietnam on 17–18 January 2019 to attend the 7th meeting of the ASEAN-India Tourism Ministers and ASEAN Tourism Forum 2019 in Ha Long City. Two India-Vietnam Tourism Roadshows were held in January and August 2019 in Hanoi by Embassy of India, and another roadshow was held by the Consulate General of India in Ho Chi Minh City in November 2019 to promote tourism exchanges.

=== Anniversaries ===
The year 2012 marked the 40th anniversary of diplomatic relations between India and Vietnam, and the 20th anniversary of India's partnership with ASEAN. The two countries marked the occasion by celebrating 2012 as the "Year of Friendship between India and Vietnam". Commemorative seminars, business events, performances by cultural troupes, film festivals, a culinary week and art exhibitions were held in both countries to mark the occasion. The Embassy of India in Hanoi and the ICCR sponsored an international conference on "Cham Civilisational Linkages between India and Vietnam" in Danang in June 2012. INS Sudarshini made a goodwill visit to Danang from 31 December 2012 to 3 January 2013 and held cultural programmes in the city.

An exhibition on "India & Vietnam for Peace and Development" uneveiled on 28 August 2016 at the War Remnant Museum, Ho Chi Minh City and exhibited for two months to commemorate the 125th birth anniversary of Ho Chi Minh, the 40th anniversary of the reunification of Vietnam, the 70th anniversary of Vietnam Declaration of Independence and 43rd anniversary of establishment of full diplomatic relations between India and Vietnam.

The Buddhist Sangha of Vietnam, the Vietnam-India Friendship Association (VIFA), and the Embassy of India organized a four-day "Buddhist Festival - Days of India" celebration in Tay Thien, Tam Dao District, Vinh Phuc Province to mark the 45th anniversary of the establishment of diplomatic relations between India and Vietnam and the 10th anniversary of relations being upgraded to a Strategic Partnership. The festival was inaugurated on 16 March 2017 by Vietnamese Minister of Information and Communication Ha Ngoc Chien. Chien is also the Chairman of VIFA, and the Chairman of the Parliamentary Friendship Group for India at the National Assembly. A delegation of 200 monks and nuns from Ladhak and Darjeeling, under the leadership of Gyalwang Drukpa Jigme Pema Wangchen from the Hemis Jangchubling Monastery in Leh participated in the celebrations. The Tay Thien Pagoda, which presided over the opening ceremony, and its devotees are adherents of Gyalwang Drukpa.

India and Vietnam agreed to celebrate the year 2017 as a "Year of Friendship" to commemorate the 45th anniversary of the establishment of diplomatic relations and 10th anniversary of the establishment of the Strategic Partnership. Several cultural events, food festivals, exhibitions and academic seminars and conferences were held throughout the year.

== Indians in Vietnam ==
There were an estimated 5,500 Indians residing in Vietnam as of June 2021. Most of the community lives in Ho Chi Minh City. Some Indians hold senior positions in multinational companies and international organisations based in Vietnam. The Indian Business Chamber (INCHAM) is an organization recognized by the Government of Vietnam that represents the Indian community and promotes Indian business interests in Vietnam.

== See also ==
- Cochinchina
- French Cochinchina
- French Indochina
- France–India relations
- Foreign relations of India
- Foreign relations of Vietnam
- Foreign relations of France

== Bibliography ==
- Lokesh, Chandra, & International Academy of Indian Culture. (2000). Society and culture of Southeast Asia: Continuities and changes. New Delhi: International Academy of Indian Culture and Aditya Prakashan.
- Cœdès, George (1968). Walter F. Vella (ed.). The Indianized States of Southeast Asia. trans.Susan Brown Cowing. University of Hawaii Press. ISBN 978-0-8248-0368-1.
- R. C. Majumdar, Study of Sanskrit in South-East Asia
- R. C. Majumdar, Champa, Ancient Indian Colonies in the Far East, Vol.I, Lahore, 1927. ISBN 0-8364-2802-1
- R. C. Majumdar, Suvarnadvipa, Ancient Indian Colonies in the Far East, Vol.II, Calcutta,
- R. C. Majumdar, Kambuja Desa Or An Ancient Hindu Colony In Cambodia, Madras, 1944
- R. C. Majumdar, Hindu Colonies in the Far East, Calcutta, 1944, ISBN 99910-0-001-1
- R. C. Majumdar, India and South-East Asia, I.S.P.Q.S. History and Archaeology Series Vol. 6, 1979, ISBN 81-7018-046-5.
- R. C. Majumdar, Ancient Indian colonisation in South-East Asia; History of the Hindu Colonization and Hindu Culture in South-East Asia
- Daigorō Chihara (1996). Hindu-Buddhist Architecture in Southeast Asia. BRILL. ISBN 90-04-10512-3.
- Sharma, Geetesh. India-Vietnam Relations : First to Twenty-First Century. Kolkata, Dialogue Society, 2004
