= Philippines–Vietnam relations =

- Philippines: Vietnam

The Philippines–Vietnam relations refers to the bilateral relations of the Republic of the Philippines and the Socialist Republic of Vietnam. Since the end of the Cold War, relations between the two countries have warmed significantly. Vietnam is sometimes referred to as the only communist military ally of the Philippines, especially after Vietnam joined ASEAN in 1995. Both nations have cooperated in the fields of education, tourism, agriculture, aquaculture, trade, and defense. Additionally, both nations have similar positions on the South China Sea issue, with Vietnam backing the Philippine victory in the ICC against China, and the Philippines backing to a certain extent the claim of Vietnam in the Paracels. Both nations have overlapping claims in the Spratlys, but have never made military confrontations as both view each other as diplomatic allies and ASEAN brethren.

== Early history ==
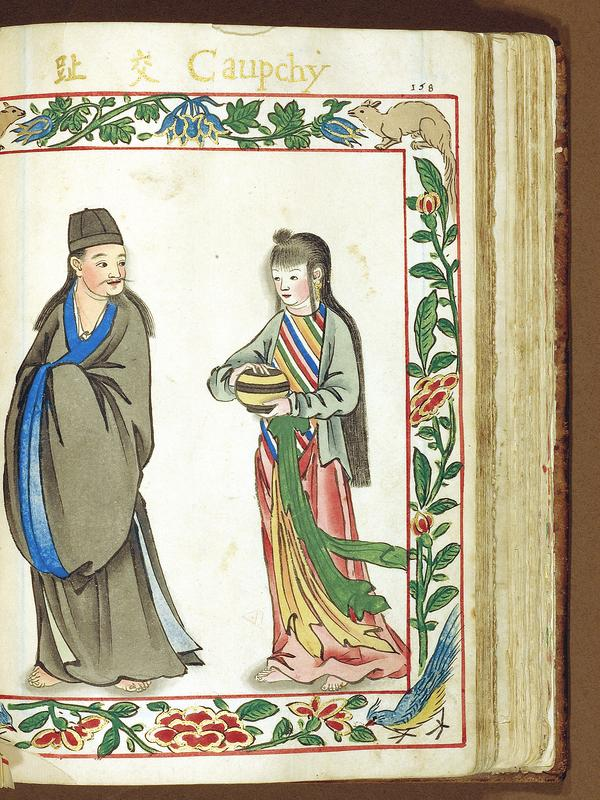
Vietnamese from Giao Chỉ (Northern Vietnam) in the Philippines, c. 1590 Boxer Codex

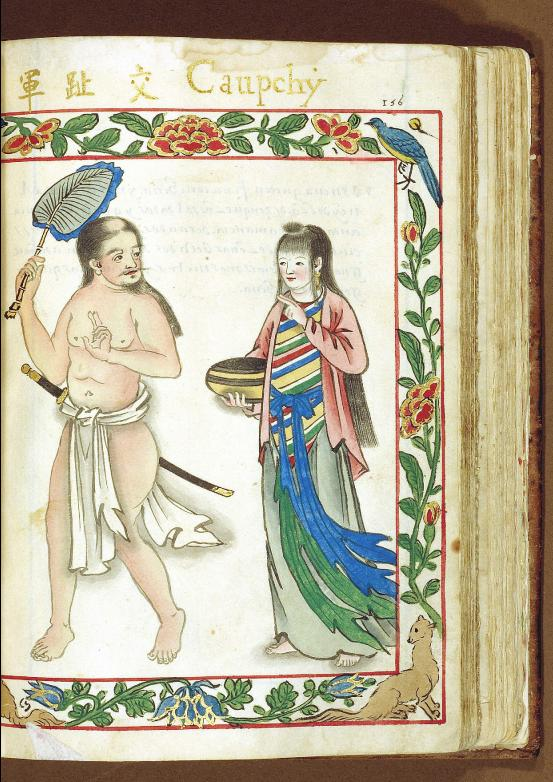
Vietnamese Warrior from Giao Chỉ (Northern Vietnam) in the Philippines, c. 1590 Boxer Codex

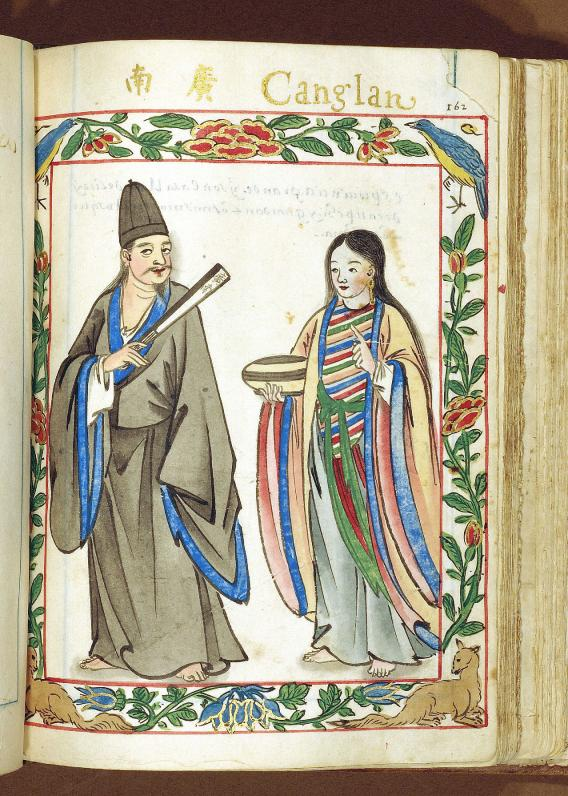
Vietnamese from Quảng Nam (Southern Vietnam) in the Philippines, c. 1590 Boxer Codex

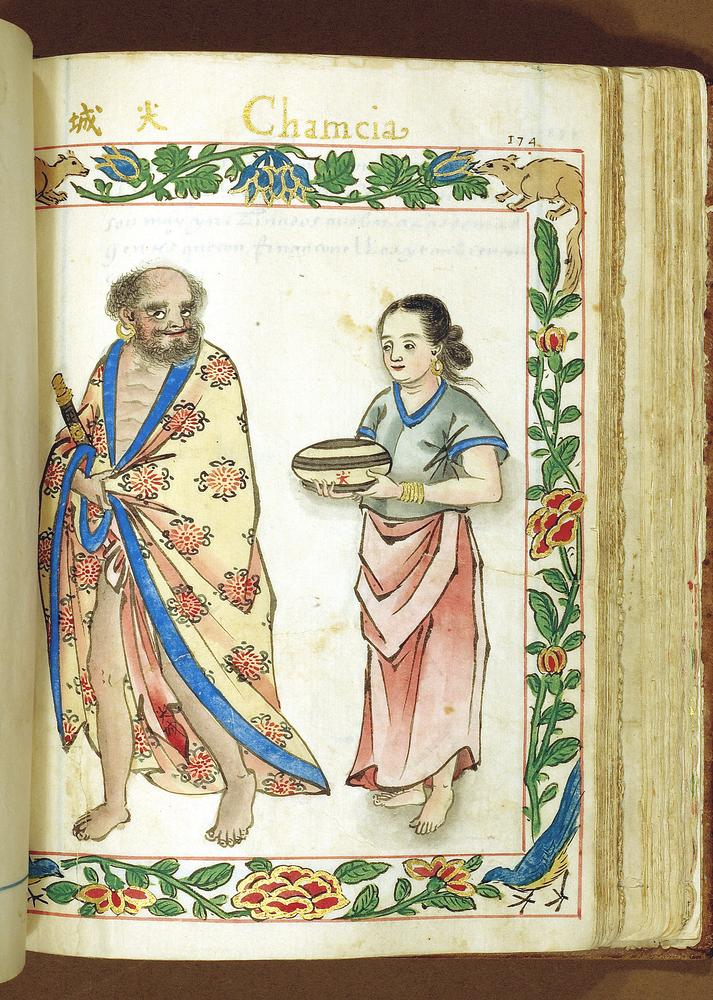
Cham Couple from Champa (in modern-day Southern Vietnam) in the Philippines, c. 1590 Boxer Codex

Relations between the Philippines and Vietnam began centuries ago. There was proof that inhabitants of both countries were already involved in maritime trade prior to the arrival of Europeans. Ships from Luzon in the Philippine archipelago came to the great port of Vietnam in the Gulf of Tonkin to trade.

By 1500 BC, jade that was manufactured in the Philippines using raw materials from Taiwan, ended up in Vietnamese ports. Likewise, by 1000 BC, bronze drums from the Dong Son Culture in Hanoi, were exported to ports in the Philippines.

The Song dynasty's "The History of Song", show that the Filipino nation of Ma-i at Mindoro was a mere two days’ sail from Champa (a nation that once occupied central Vietnam) and that Champa’s and Mai’s merchants traded frequently with each other.

During 1000 AD, there was a commercial rivalry for Chinese trade between the Champa Civilization in Central and South Vietnam vs the Rajahnate of Butuan in Southern Philippines.

The Chams then migrated to the Sulu archipelago, home of the then Hindu would-be Sulu Sultanate. These Chams in southwestern Philippines were called Orang Dampuan. Champa and Sulu engaged in commerce with each other which resulted in merchant Chams settling in Sulu during the 10th-13th centuries. The Orang Dampuan were slaughtered by envious native Sulu Buranuns due to the wealth of the Orang Dampuan. The Buranun were then subjected to retaliatory slaughter by the Orang Dampuan. Harmonious commerce between Sulu and the Orang Dampuan was later restored. The Yakans were descendants of the Taguima-based Orang Dampuan who came to Sulu from Champa. Sulu received civilization in its Indic form from the Orang Dampuan.

During the transition from the precolonial to colonial eras, both the Philippines and Vietnam witnessed the actions of the Pirates of the South China Coast and how Fujianese pirates and Wokous from Japan intervened in the political, military and commercial affairs of the Vietnamese coast and Philippine archipelago.

Maritime trade relations were then disrupted with the conquest of the Philippines by the Spaniards in the 16th century and the conquest of Vietnam by the French in the 19th century.

The French occupation of Vietnam was successful partially because of assistance from Spanish-Philippines as soldiers from Spanish-Philippines which also included Mexican immigrants, were used by the French to augment the forces that invaded Saigon.

== Cold War ==
Philippines–South Vietnam relations

- Philippines: South Vietnam

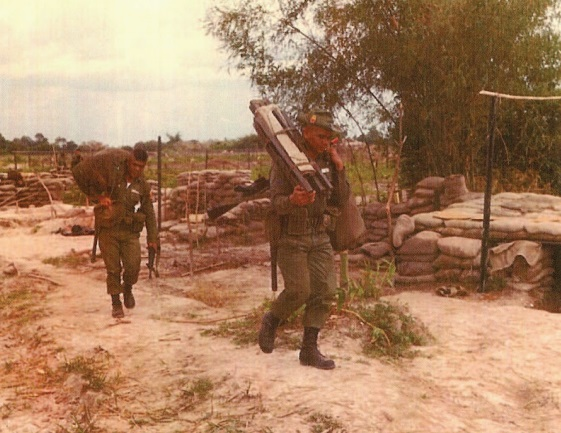
Members of the Philippine Civic Action Group (PHILCAG) arriving in Tay Ninh who were assisting the South Vietnamese government in the Vietnam War.

The Philippines was initially aligned with South Vietnam and provided them humanitarian aid in the Vietnam War.

Before the Fall of Saigon, which preludes the disestablishment of South Vietnam, the Philippines was already preparing to establish relations with North Vietnam. President Marcos authorised his wife, First Lady Imelda Marcos, to make direct contacts while she was conducting state visits to Middle-eastern countries in early 1975. The communist takeover of Cambodia and the impending defeat of South Vietnamese forces led Manila to establish ties with Hanoi. The move was not seen as surprising as it was in line with Marcos' foreign policy to strengthen ties with socialist states in order to broaden economic and trade ties.

On July 9, 1976, Vietnam Deputy Foreign Minister Phan Hien arrived in Manila to discuss the formal establishment of ties between the two countries. On July 12, 1976, formal relations were finally established with the Philippines the fourth country in the ASEAN to establish relations with the Socialist Republic of Vietnam after Malaysia, Indonesia and Singapore. The Philippines and Vietnam opened their respective embassies in 1978.

Among the first problems to test the relation between the two countries was the repatriation of 14 Filipinos and 10 Vietnamese families who were still in Ho Chi Minh City, attempts of Vietnamese nationals to illegally enter the Philippines by claiming themselves to be members of Filipino families, and the involvement of Filipinos in the black market was received by the Philippine embassy. These issues hampered relations until the early 1980s.

== Post-Cold War relations ==
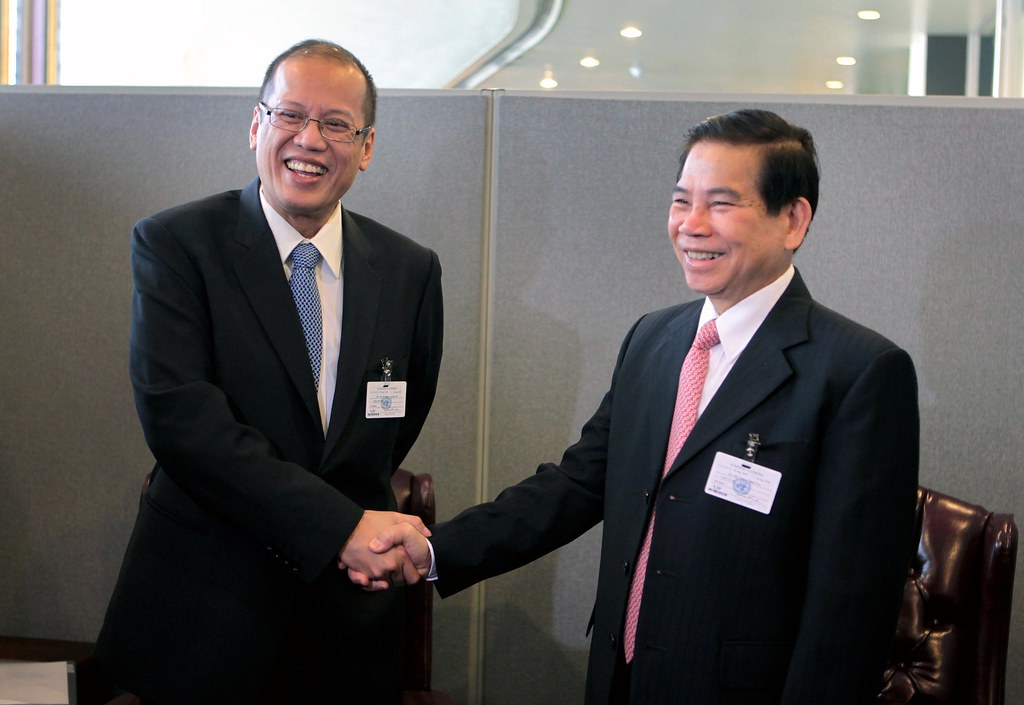
President Benigno Aquino III and President Nguyễn Minh Triết during a bilateral meeting in 2010

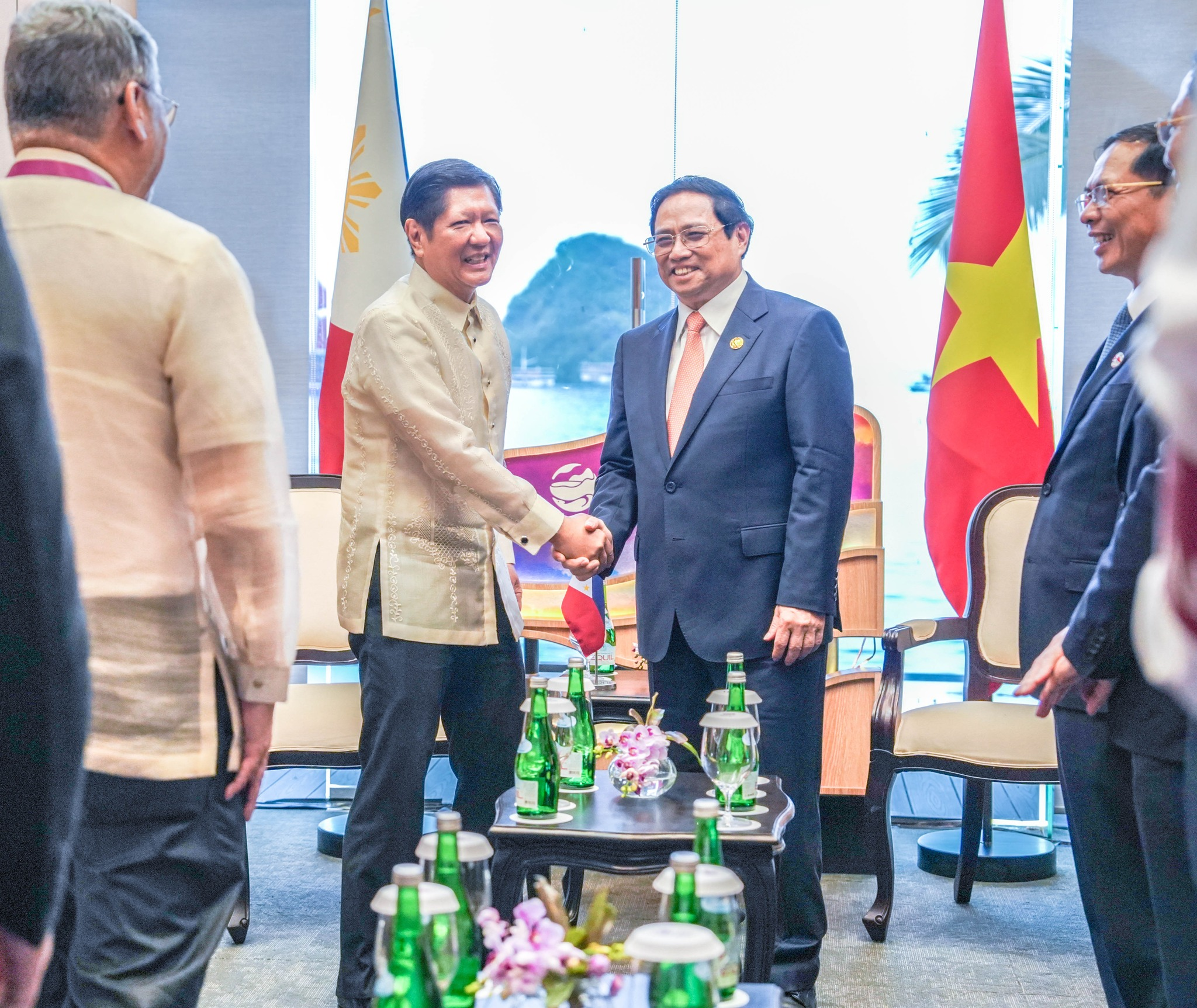
President Bongbong Marcos and Prime Minister Phạm Minh Chính during a bilateral meeting in 2023

Despite Vietnam's alignment with the Soviet Union and the Philippines with the United States during the Cold War, bilateral ties between the two countries can be recently described as friendly. On October 26, 2011, Vietnamese President Truong Tan Sang made a state visit to the Philippines where he met with his Filipino counterpart, President Benigno Aquino III. The two countries signed four agreements on naval, coast guard and tourism as part of the Philippine-Vietnam Action Plan 2011–2016 framework. A Memorandum of Understanding agreement supported information sharing between the Philippine Navy and the Vietnam People's Navy.

Both being victims of Typhoon Haiyan (though Vietnam was not as greatly affected as previously expected), the Vietnamese still donated to help the Philippines in its rehabilitation efforts after the natural disaster, through the Vietnam Red Cross Society.

=== Disputes in the South China Sea ===
The Philippines and Vietnam have territorial disputes over the Spratly Islands, along with Brunei, China, Malaysia, and Taiwan. The Philippines and Vietnam both disapprove of China's nine-dash map which China uses as justification for its claim in the South China Sea. Both countries were also committed to a multilateral diplomatic approach to the resolution of disputes in the South China Sea with the UNCLOS taken into account.

In December 2015, pirates believed to be from the Moro Pirates, rogue Muslim Filipinos wanted for war crimes in the Philippines, murdered a Vietnamese fisherman in the South China Sea, which sparked a strong protest from the Vietnamese side. The event also sparked outrage from the Philippine side, who was persecuting the wanted criminals who may have been influenced by Islamic terrorism. Both Vietnam and the Philippines have upheld a variety of international agreements against terrorism in the region.

In 2016, after a legal battle in The Hague, the International Court of Justice of the United Nations ruled in favor of all arguments of the Philippines against China's claims in the South China Sea, effectively nullifying China's claims in the international legal arena. However, China waived the international court's ruling despite being a signatory with respect to international laws and UNCLOS and sent more military vessels to the South China Sea, replacing corals reefs with man-made islands that house military bases and missile launchers. Vietnam formally supported the Philippines in its arbitration case against China regarding China's nine-dash claim over the South China Sea in the entirety of the case.

In August 2017, Vietnam pushed for the inclusion of a stronger statement against Chinese activities in the South China Sea.

In May 2019, after a Chinese vessel rammed and sank a civilian Filipino vessel and left 22 Filipino fishermen adrift and exposed to the elements, Vietnam sent a ship that successfully rescued the drowning Filipinos, gaining praise from the Philippine side.

On 1 June 2026, the Philippines and Vietnam upgraded their ties to an enhanced strategic partnership. Both countries stressed that peace, stability, and freedom of navigation in the South China Sea are "non-negotiable," signaling a shared stance against China’s assertive actions in the region. They also agreed to deepen cooperation in defense, security, trade, and food supplies, while committing to resolve disputes peacefully under international law.

== Military ties ==
A Memorandum of Understanding agreement supported information sharing between the Philippine Navy and the Vietnam People's Navy.

On November 23, 2014, two frigates from the Vietnamese People's Navy made its first port call to the Philippines. Vessels HQ-011 Dinh Tien Hoang and HQ-012 Ly Thai To docked at the Manila South Harbor for a goodwill visit which lasted three days. The move was initiated by former President Benigno Aquino III.

In August 2024, the Vietnamese Coast Guard sent the ship CSB 8002 to take part in the first joint naval drills with the Philippine Coast Guard by the Philippines and Vietnam, and will be the first Vietnamese Coast Guard vessel to visit the Philippines.

== Cyber Crime ==
On February 27, 2025, Philippine authorities arrested 401 individuals, including 132 Vietnamese nationals, in a raid on a suspected online gambling and scam hub in Pasay City. The suspects were accused of involvement in illegal online gaming, cryptocurrency, romance, and investment scams. The operation followed a report from a concerned citizen and led to the seizure of electronic equipment used for scamming. The incident highlights ongoing concerns about cybercrime and exploitation in Southeast Asia, with many workers, including those from Vietnam, being coerced into participating in such operations.

== Country comparison ==
Official name	Republic of the Philippines	Socialist Republic of Vietnam
Native Name	Republika ng Pilipinas	Cộng hòa Xã hội chủ nghĩa Việt Nam
Coat of Arms		
Flag	Philippines	Vietnam
National Motto	Maka-Diyos, Maka-Tao, Makakalikasan at Makabansa "For God, People, Nature and Country"	Độc lập – Tự do – Hạnh phúc "Independence – Liberty – Happiness"
National Anthem	Lupang Hinirang "Chosen Land"	Tiến Quân Ca' "Song of Advancing Soldiers"
Population	117,337,368	98,858,950
Area	345,598 km^{2} (133,436 mi^{2})	331,689 km^{2} (128,066 mi^{2})
Population Density	394/km^{2} (1,020/sq mi)	319/km^{2} (830/sq mi)
Time zones	Philippine Standard Time (UTC+08:00)	Indochina Time (UTC+07:00)
Capital	Manila	Hanoi
Largest City	Quezon City – 2,936,116	Ho Chi Minh City – 8,426,100
Government	Unitary presidential constitutional republic	Unitary Marxist–Leninist socialist republic
Party System	Multi-party system	One-party system
Established	12 June 1898 (Declared); 4 July 1946 (Granted)	2 September 1945 (Declared); 30 April 1975 (Reunification)
Predecessor States	Spanish Colonial Period (1565–1898); Tondo (historical polity) (900–1589); Captaincy General of the Philippines (1565–1898); Republic of the Tagalog People (1896–1897) American Colonial Period (1898–1946); Military Government of the Philippine Islands (1898–1902); Philippine Republic (1899–1902); Insular Government of the Philippine Islands (1902–1935); Commonwealth of the Philippines (1935–1946); Japanese-sponsored Philippine Republic (1943–1945) Post–Colonial Period (1946–present); Republic of the Philippines: Post–War Period (1946–1972); Dictatorial Period (1972–1986); Democratic Period (1986–present)	French Colonial Period (1858–1954); Nguyễn Dynasty (1802–1883); Colony of Cochinchina (1862–1949); Protectorate of Tonkin (1883–1948); Protectorate of Annam (1883–1948); Japanese-sponsored Vietnamese Empire (1945); State of Vietnam (1949–1955) American War Period (1954–1976); Democratic Republic of Vietnam (1945–1976); Republic of Vietnam (1955–1975); Republic of South Vietnam (1969–1976) Post–Division Period (1976–present); Socialist Republic of Vietnam: Post–War Period (1976–1986); Renovated Period (1986–present)
First Leader	Emilio Aguinaldo (official); Manuel Luis Quezon (de jure)	Ho Chi Minh (official); Lê Duẩn (reunified)
Current Leader(s)	President: Bongbong Marcos	General Secretary of the Communist Party of Vietnam: Tô Lâm
Current Leader(s)	Vice President: Sara Duterte-Carpio	President: Lương Cường; Prime Minister: Phạm Minh Chính
Legislature	Congress (Bicameral) Senate; President: Juan Miguel Zubiri; House of Representatives; Speaker: Martin Romualdez	National Assembly (Unicameral); Chairperson: Trần Thanh Mẫn
Judiciary	Supreme Court; Chief Justice: Alexander Gesmundo	Supreme People's Court; Chief Justice: Nguyễn Hòa Bình
Military	Armed Forces of the Philippines; Chief of Staff: Andres Centino	People's Army of Vietnam; Chief of General Staff: Nguyễn Tân Cương
Military	Philippine Army; Philippine Air Force; Philippine Navy: Philippine Marine Corps; Philippine Coast Guard	Vietnam People's Ground Forces; Vietnam People's Air Force; Vietnam People's Navy; Vietnam Border Defence Force; Vietnam Coast Guard
Law Enforcement Agency	Philippine National Police (PNP)	Vietnam People's Public Security
Religion	Catholicism: 80.6%; Protestantism: 8.2%; Islam: 5.6%; Tribal: 0.2%; Others: 5.1%	Folk: 73.1%; Buddhism: 12.2%; Catholicism: 6.9%; Caodaism: 4.8%; Others: 3.0%
Ethnic groups	Tagalog: 24.4% Cebuano: 21.3% Ilocano: 8.8% Hiligaynon: 8.4% Bicolano: 6.8% Others: 30.2%	Kinh: 85.3; Tay: 1.9% Tai: 1.9% Muong: 1.5% Hmong: 1.5% Others: 9.4%
National language	Filipino	Vietnamese
GDP (PPP)	US$811.726 billion ($7,846 per capita)	US$648.243 billion ($6,925 per capita)
Currency	Philippine peso (₱/PHP)	Vietnamese đồng (đ/VND)

== Resident diplomatic missions ==
- the Philippines has an embassy in Hanoi.
- Vietnam has an embassy in Manila.

== See also ==
- Foreign relations of the Philippines
- Foreign relations of Vietnam
- Filipinos in Vietnam
- Vietnamese people in the Philippines
