= Proper Cloth =

American men's clothing company

- Company type: Private
- Founded: 2008; 18 years ago in United States
- Founders: Seph Skeritt
- Headquarters: New York City
- Products: Dress shirts
- Website: propercloth.com

Proper Cloth (stylized in all caps) is an American men's made-to-measure tailored clothing company founded in 2008. The company has headquarters in New York City and manufacturing in Vietnam.

== Founding ==
The company was founded in New York City in the aftermath of the 2008 financial crisis with founder Seph Skeritt believing that by "eliminating retail overhead" the company could offer custom clothing at similar costs to off-the-rack. The company's base price in 2011 was $89.

== Products ==
Proper Cloth is known for offering custom clothing through its Smart Size survey, physical showrooms (USA), wide array of standard sizes, and Home Try-On garments. The company claims its "Smart Sizes" online survey allows users to receive "expertly tailored shirts" without visiting a tailor. It customizes customer's clothing sizes based on their reported physical attributes, preferences, and demographics. However, the New York Times described the results as "sew disappointing" following a trial.

Its most popular item is the Supima cotton and spandex non-iron stretch shirt in white. Items are manufactured in Vietnam.
