= Đại Hùng oilfield =

Oil field in Nam Con Son Basin, Vietnam

Dai Hung oilfield
- Location of the Dai Hung oilfield
- Country: Vietnam
- Region: Viet Nam Sea
- Location: Nam Con Son Basin
- Block: 05-1
- Offshore/onshore: Offshore
- Coordinates: 8°26′21″N 108°41′15″E
- Operator: Petrovietnam

Field history
- Discovery: 1974
- Start of development: 1986
- Start of production: October 1994
- Abandonment: 2025

Dai Hung oilfield (Mỏ Đại Hùng in Vietnamese) is an oil field in the block 05.1 belong to northwest of Nam Con Son Basin, Vietnamese offshore, South China Sea. This field is discovered in 1988, estimated the reserve of petroleum about 354.6 million barrels (56.38×10^{6} m^{3}) oil; 8.482 trillion cubic metres (2.995×10^{14} cubic feet) of natural gas and 1.48 million barrels (235×10^{3} m^{3}) condensate with the probability of 50%.
