= Gepard-class frigate =

Russian-built warships

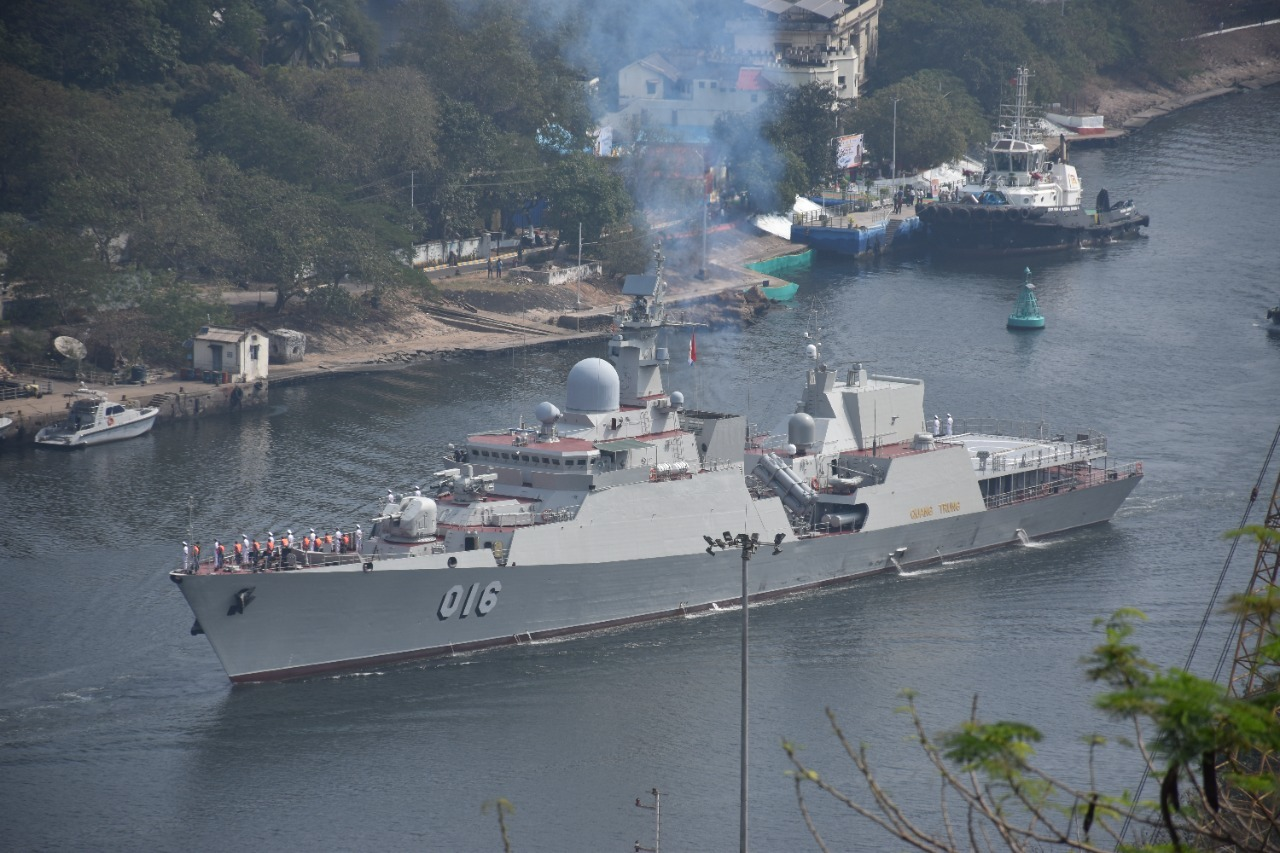
- Quang Trung - one of the two ships in the second batch of Gepard 3.9 built for the Vietnam People's Navy

Class overview
- Name: Gepard class (Project 1166.1)
- Builders: Zelenodolsk Plant Gorky
- Operators: Russian Navy; Vietnam People's Navy
- Preceded by: Koni class; Grisha class
- Subclasses: Project 11661 Tatarstan; Project 11661K Dagestan; Project 11661E Gepard: Gepard 3.9: Batch I; Batch II; Gepard 5.1; Gepard 5.3
- Cost: 11661E (Gepard 3.9 batch I): US$175 million per ship; 11661E (Gepard 3.9 batch II): US$350 million per ship (price included ammunition, maintenance packages signed between Vietnam and Russia)
- Built: 1991–2016
- Planned: 10
- Completed: 6
- Cancelled: 2
- Active: 6

General characteristics
- Type: Frigate
- Displacement: 1,500 tons (standard); 2,500 tons (Gepard 3.9)
- Length: Approx 102.4 m (336 ft) (Gepard 3.9 batch II)
- Beam: 13.09 m (42.9 ft); Approx 15 m (49 ft) (Gepard 3.9)
- Draught: 5.7 m (19 ft)
- Propulsion: Twin-shaft CODOG, FPP, 2 × 14,300 + 1 × 6,000 (kW)
- Speed: 29 knots (54 km/h; 33 mph)
- Range: 4,000 nmi (7,000 km) at 10 knots (19 km/h)
- Endurance: 20 days
- Complement: 94
- Sensors & processing systems: MR-231-1 Pal navigation radar; Mineral-ME shipborne multifunctional radar system (including guidance and target designation functions for cruise missiles); 5P-26/MR-352 Pozitiv-ME1/-ME1.2 3D active shipborne radars; 5P-10E-03E Laska fire control radar for naval gun and CIWS; Sonar: MGK-335EM-03 with under-keel antenna
- Electronic warfare & decoys: EW Suite: 2 × Bell Shroud passive intercept, 2 × Bell Squat jammers, Countermeasures: 4 × 16-barreled Pk-16 decoy launchers
- Armament: Artillery: 1 × 76.2mm AK-176M/MA naval gun; 2 × AK-630M CIWS (Tatarstan and VPN configuration); Cruise missiles: 8 × UKSK VLS cells for Kalibr missiles (Dagestan) (up to 16x cells in configurations offered to the export market; options for Club-N, Yakhont and BrahMos missile systems are available); 2 × quadruple launchers (2×4) Kh-35 anti-ship missiles (Tatarstan and VPN's Batch I & II configuration); Anti-submarine warfare: 2 × 533mm DTA-53 twin-tube (2×2) torpedo launchers (not featured on VPN's Batch I); Naval mines; Anti-air warfare: 1 × Palash/Palma-SU CIWS featured with 8x Sosna-R short range air defense missiles (Dagestan and VPN configuration); 1 × Osa-M twin-launcher for 20x 9M33M short range air defense missiles (Tatarstan); 12 × Shtil-1 VLS cells for 9M317ME medium-range surface-to-air missiles (offered configuration for the export market)

The Gepard-class frigates, Russian designation Project 11661, is a Russian class of frigates that were intended as successors to the earlier Koni-class frigates and Grisha, and Parchim-class corvettes. The first unit of the class, Yastreb (Hawk), was laid down at the Zelenodol'sk Zavod shipyard at Tatarstan in 1991. She was launched in July 1993, after which she began fitting out; fitting was nearly completed by late 1995, when it was suspended due to lack of funds. Renamed Tatarstan, the ship was finally completed in July 2002, and became the flagship of the Caspian Flotilla. She has two sister ships, Albatross (renamed Dagestan), and Burevestnik (Storm Petrel), which was still under construction as of 2012.

Vietnam is the main operator of the class with its navy having commissioned 4 frigates - twice the size of Russia's Project 11661 inventory.

== Design ==
The hull and superstructure are constructed primarily of steel, with some aluminium-magnesium being used in the upper superstructure. Gepard is Russian for cheetah.

== Service history ==
In October 2015, Dagestan, in company with three Buyan-M-class corvettes serving with the Caspian Flotilla, launched cruise missiles at targets in Syria. The missiles flew nearly 1,500 kilometres (930 mi) over Iran and Iraq and struck targets in Raqqa and Aleppo provinces (controlled by the Islamic State) as well as Idlib province (controlled by the al-Qaeda-linked Nusra Front). Peshmerga forces (Kurdish armed forces located in northern Iraq) published a video allegedly depicting two cruise missiles mid-flight en route to Syria.

On 6 November 2024, the Ukrainian Main Directorate of Intelligence attempted to strike Tatarstan and Dagestan with modified Aeroprakt A-22 light sport aircraft while in berth at Kaspiysk Naval Base. Ukrainian sources claimed that both Tatarstan and Dagestan, as well as a Buyan-class corvette were damaged. However, both ships were reported active in 2025.

== Export ==
The Gepard-class was designed from the outset as a lightweight, inexpensive export vessel. Russia offers three variants of the class to the market:

- Gepard 3.9: designed to search, track and fight against surface, underwater and air enemy independently and within task force, plant mine fields, provide protection and patrol of maritime state border and exclusive economic zone, perform combat missions, patrol service. Powered by gas-turbine engines with CODOG configuration. Fitted with two inclined quadruple launchers for eight Kh-35 anti-ship missiles with alternative options to be featured with VLS systems such as UKSK (for cruise missiles such as Club-N and Yakhont) and Shtil-1 air-defense system. Being the only exported variant with Vietnam being its first and only operator.
- Gepard 5.1: configured as an ocean-going patrol ship. Intended for patrolling territorial waters, helping in distress on the sea, environment protection, support to marine missions and flag demonstration in areas being of state interest. Can be featured with "heavier" weapons if necessary. Powered entirely by diesel engines with a two-shaft CODAD propulsion plant.
- Gepard 5.3: designed to search, track and fight against surface, underwater and air enemy independently and within task force, carry out convoy missions and patrol duty, guard maritime state border and economic zone. Featured with four quadruple launchers for sixteen Kh-35 anti-ship missiles. Powered by a two-shaft CODAD propulsion plant.

=== Vietnam ===
In March and August of 2011, the Vietnam People's Navy received two Gepard 3.9-class frigates ordered in 2006, built in Russia at Tatarstan's Gorky Shipbuilding Plant. In late 2011, Vietnam signed a contract for an additional batch of two ships in an anti-submarine configuration. A further two ships are being considered to bring the total order up to six vessels, and that potential acquisition is likely being stalled due to sanctions towards Russia as a result of Russia's war in Ukraine .

=== Sri Lanka ===
Sri Lanka began talks for the credit purchase of a Gepard 5.1 frigate in 2017 and the Sri Lankan cabinet approved the proposal by President Maithripala Sirisena for the purchase of the ship in September 2017. However, the deal was unsuccessful due to Sri Lankan economic issues.

== Ships ==
No.	Name	Namesake	Project designation	Builder	Laid Down	Launched	Commissioned	Fleet	Status
Russian Navy (2)
691	Tatarstan (ex-Yastreb)	Republic of Tatarstan	11661	Zelenodolsk Shipyard	1993	2 July 2001	31 August 2003	Caspian	Active
693	Dagestan (ex-Albatros)	Republic of Dagestan	11661K	Zelenodolsk Shipyard	1994	1 April 2011	28 November 2012	Caspian	Active
Vietnam People's Navy (4+2)
011	Dinh Tien Hoang	Đinh Tiên Hoàng	11661E (Gepard 3.9 batch I)	Zelenodolsk Shipyard	10 July 2007	12 December 2010	23 March 2011	Naval Region 4	Active
012	Ly Thai To	Lý Thái Tổ	11661E (Gepard 3.9 batch I)	Zelenodolsk Shipyard	27 November 2007	16 March 2011	22 August 2011	Naval Region 4	Active
015	Tran Hung Dao	Trần Hưng Đạo	11661E (Gepard 3.9 batch II)	Zelenodolsk Shipyard	24 September 2013	27 April 2016	6 February 2018	Naval Region 4	Active
016	Quang Trung	Quang Trung	11661E (Gepard 3.9 batch II)	Zelenodolsk Shipyard	24 September 2013	26 May 2016	6 February 2018	Naval Region 4	Active

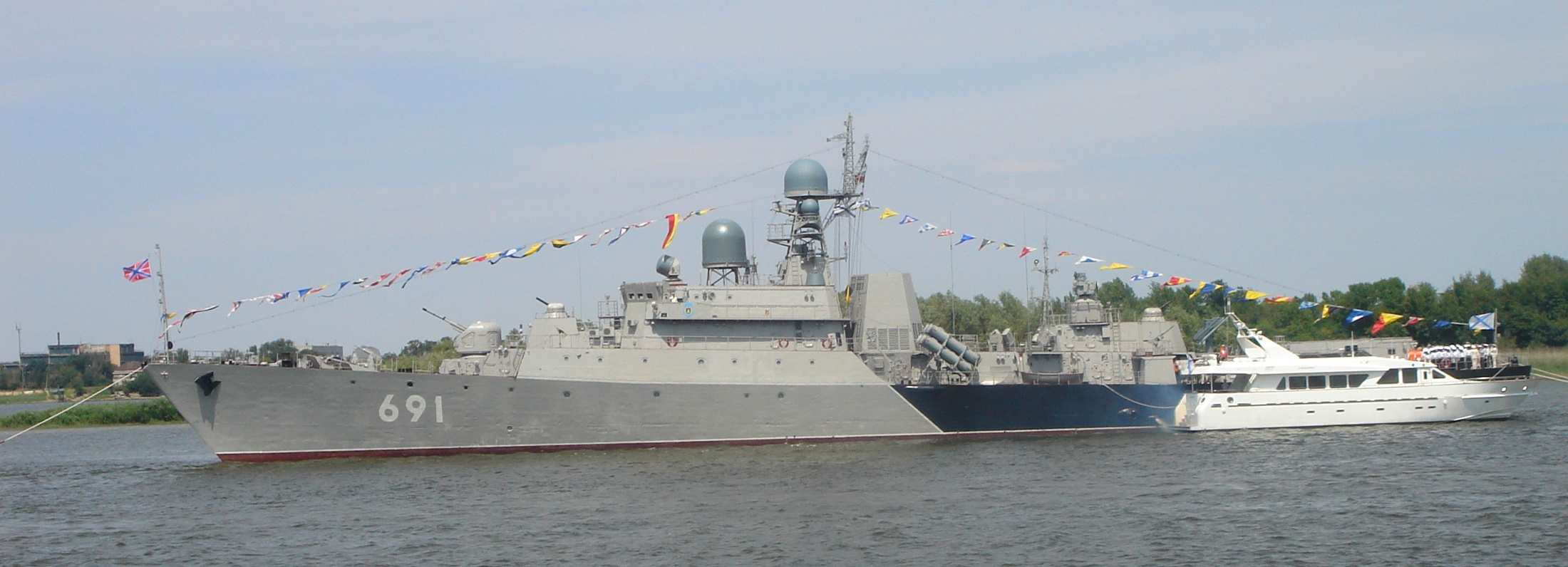
Russian frigate 691 Tatarstan

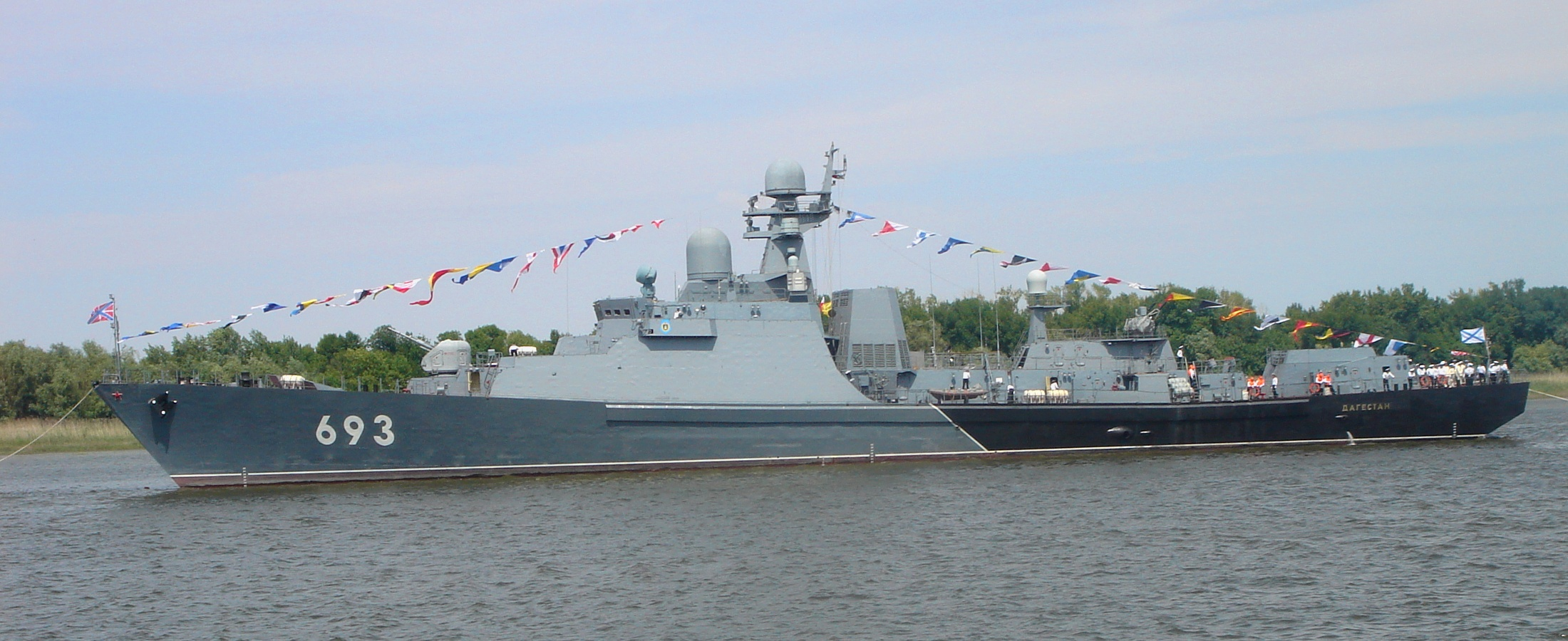
Russian frigate 693 Dagestan

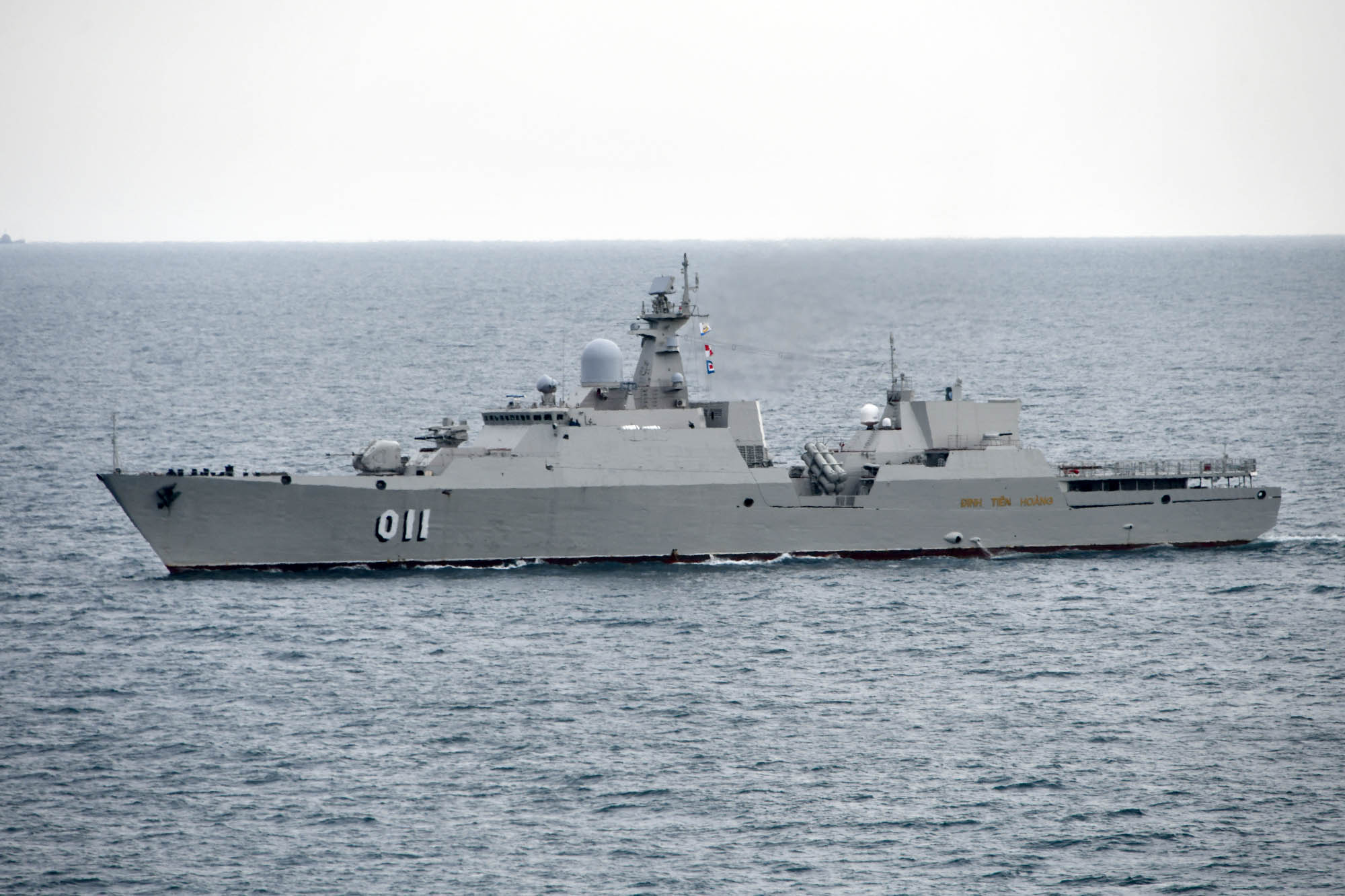
Vietnam People's Navy Ship 011 Đinh Tiên Hoàng

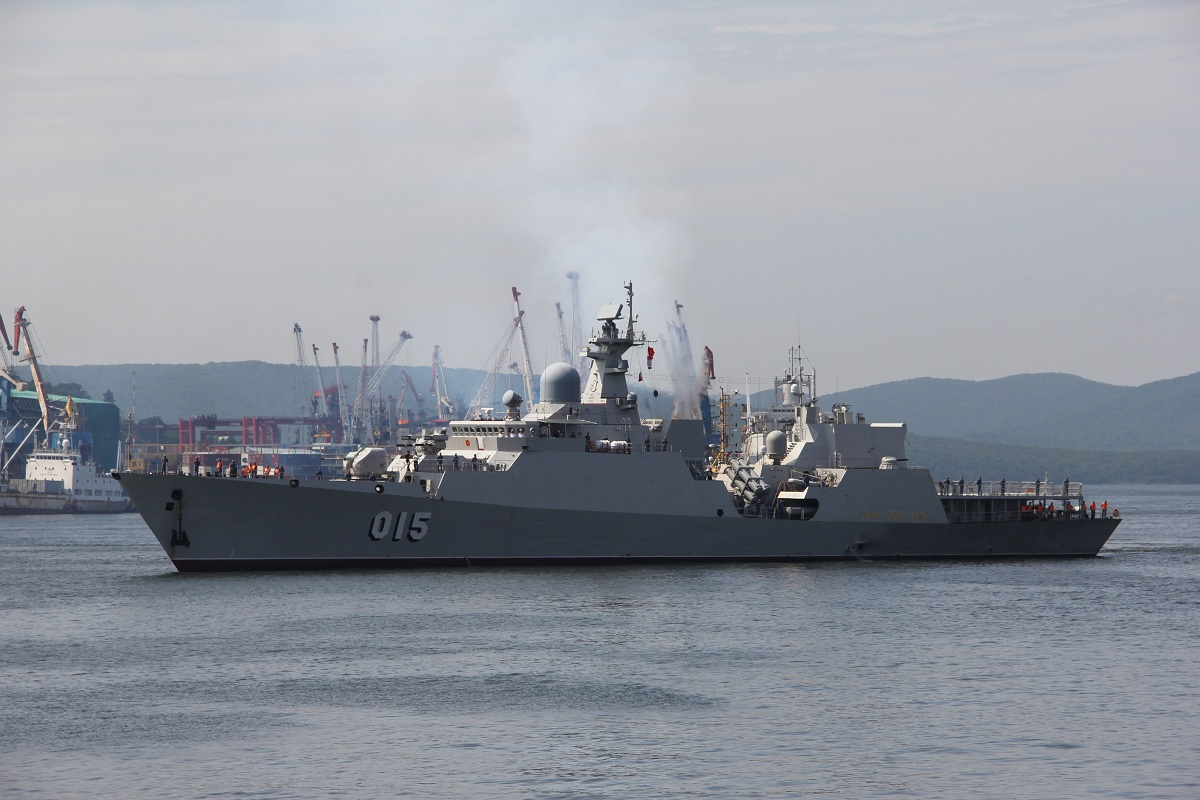
Vietnam People's Navy Ship 015 Trần Hưng Đạo

== See also ==
- List of ships of the Soviet Navy
- List of ships of Russia by project number
- List of naval ship classes in service
