= Nam Con Son Basin =

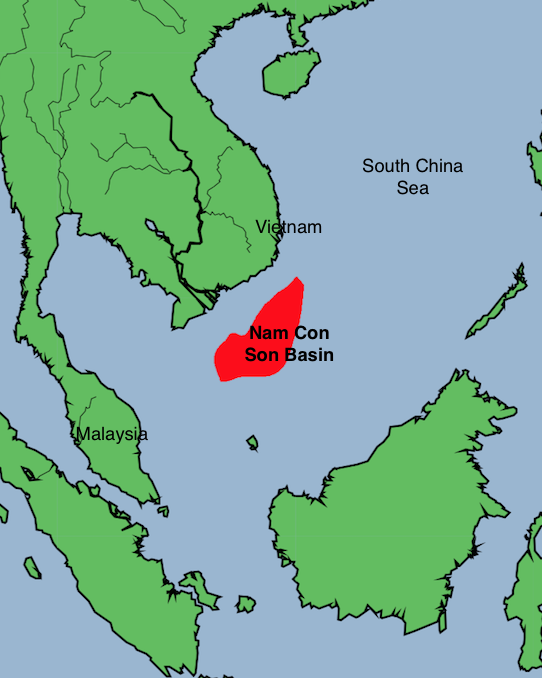
Location of Nam Con Son Basin in the South of Vietnam located in the South China Sea

The Nam Con Son Basin (also known as the Wanan Basin) formed as a rift basin during the Oligocene period. This basin is the southernmost sedimentary basin offshore of Vietnam, located within coordinates of 6°6'-9°45'N and 106°0-109°30'E in the South China Sea. It is the largest oil and gas bearing basin in Vietnam and has a number of producing fields.

== Geologic Setting ==
=== Regional ===
The Nam Con Son Basin, located adjacent to the Cuu Long Basin, is approximately 90,000 km^{2}. The Basin age ranges from Oligocene to Quaternary in age with sediment thickness of a maximum of 10 km.

While a majority of the basin is situated in less than 200 meters of shallow water, the bathymetry can go to deeper than 2000 meters to the north of the Nam Con Son Basin.

=== Structural ===
The Nam Con Son Basin was developed during the Tertiary by complex rifting of a poorly known basement. The geological formation of Nam Con Son Basin can be separated into two major structural elements: A Pre-Cenozoic strata basement and a Cenozoic sedimented cover.

The heterogeneous basement is composed of quartz diorite, granodiorite and Mesozoic metamorphic rocks. While the Pre-Tertiary basement shows an assemblage of volcanic, igneous and metasedimentary rocks. At various levels in the basement, faults cause subsidence troughs.

The cover is divided into the three sequences: The upper sequence consist of clastic and coastal marine carbonates from the Bien Dong Formation. The middle sequence have a composition of Miocene sediments of the Dua Formation, Thong-Man Cau Formations and the Nam Con Son Formation. The lower sequence which is composed from Paleogene sediments from the Cau Formation.

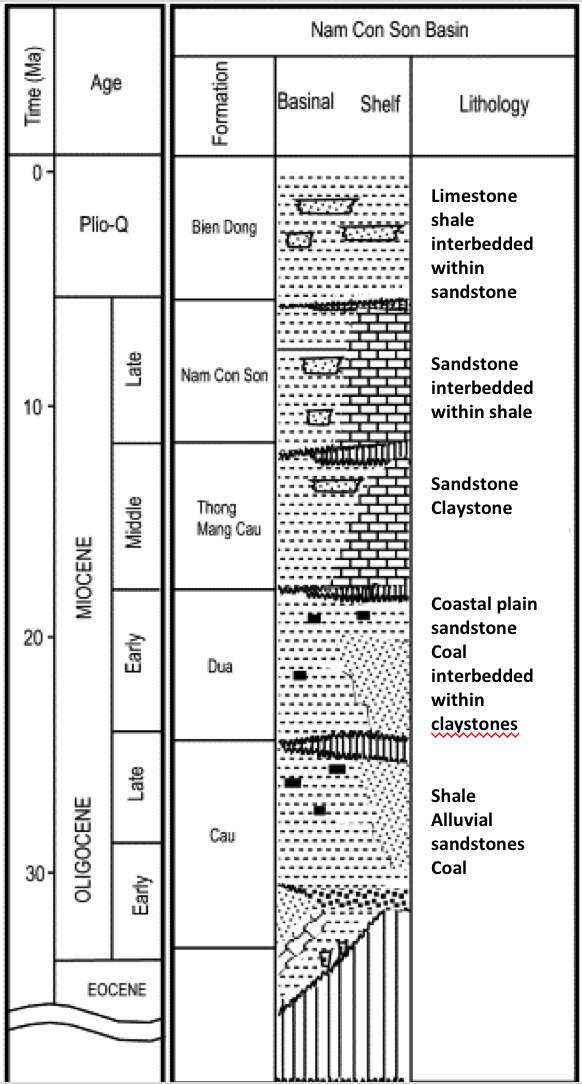
Stratigraphy of Nam Con Son Basin from the Eocene to Miocene

=== Sedimentology and stratigraphy ===
==== Cau Formation, Oligocene ====
This formation varies between 200m to 800m with the top formation composed of dark grey, greenish grey clay, intercalated with beds of sandstone, and siltstone.

The middle layer of the basin is composed of quartz sandstone intercalated with greyish black, firm claystone and a thick bed of dark grey clay intercalated with light coloured oil shale. The later of this basin is also locally fine grained and calcareous.

The bottom layer has a composition of brownish grey sandstones intercalated with several beds of silty clay.

Overall, the lithology of the Cau Formation is composed of lacustrine shale, alluvial sandstones and minor coals.

==== Dua Formation, Lower Miocene ====
Overlying unconformably in the Cau Formation, the Dua Formation is between 200m to 800m thick, composed of light and bright grey sandstone, interbedded with blackish-grey silty clay. The sandstone has characteristics of fine to medium grained, angular, quarts, with carbonate cement. This formation also has glauconite corresponding with fossil fragments.

The overall lithology of the Dua Formation in the Nam Con Son Basin consist of coastal plain sandstones and has claystones and interbedded minor coals.

==== Thong-Mang Cau Formation, Middle Miocene ====
Varying from 10m to 100m in the Thong-Man Cau formation, the upper formation has a composition of light grey, whitish/grey, locally reddish brown dolomitized carbonates and it is also intercalated with clays friable siltstones and fine grained, calcite-cemented sandstones.

The lower formation consists of sandstone and calcareous sandstones interbedded with clays and siltstones. It has fine to medium grained sandstones with carbonate cement, glauconite and fossil fragments.

As a whole, the lithology of the Thong-Man Cau Formation is made from sandstones and claystones with carbonate build up and platform.

==== Nam Con Son Formation, Upper Miocene ====
This formation has a thickness between 100m to 500m.The upper formation consist of Clay, calcareous clay and grey sandstones.

The lower formation has whitish grey carbonate and quartz sandstones.

The Nam Con Son Formation has a generally lithology of yellow claystone which are interbedded with siltstone. It is average cemented and have rich organic and fossil properties.

==== Bien Dong Formation, Pliocene-Quaternary ====
The Bien Dong Formation thickness varies from a few meters to 200m. In the Quaternary layer, moving from the bottom to the middle to the top, the Bien Dong Formation is composed of angular to round quartz sand which gradually changes to silty clay in the middle section to quartz sand imbedded with shell fragments at the top of the layer.

The Lower Pliocene layer has a composition of siltstones, friable claystones, and grey calcareous clays intercalated with white or light yellow quartz sandstone. This layer is also rich in carbonate and contains glauconite.

Overall, the Bien Dong Formation has a lithological description of shale and claystone interbedded by thin layers of sandstone, rich organic matters and fossils.

=== Tectonic systems ===
==== Eocene-Oligocene ====
Extension resulted in the development of NE-SW trending half graben which later lead to rift filled sequence. These half graben were then continuously filled by basin wide deposition of fluvial sediment from the west and thermal subsidence. The rifting phase was follow by a spreading in the seafloor with the axis shifting from WSW to SW trend.

==== Miocene ====
===== Early Miocene =====
Transgressions and backstopping of deltas resulted in sag sequences trending upwards from non-marine to marine features during early Miocene. Continental breakup occurred shortly after seafloor spreading in the Nam Con Son Basin resulted in a second SW extension phase at the rift tip by the NW-SE regional extension.

===== Middle Miocene =====
NW-SE expansion together with a change in spreading direction in the South China Sea intensified topographic relief while restricting carbonate systems to platform or footwall locations and the facies pattern. Grabens were further deposited upon deeper shelf and slope facies.

===== Late Miocene =====
Nam Con Son Basin was once again reactivated tectonically by a mild inversion followed by thermal subsidence which caused a large carbonate reef buildup and infilled by sandy turbidites.

Major transgression caused the depositional process to be interrupted in the early Pliocene.

== Petroleum ==
The Nam Con Son Basin has an oil prone source rock, with a dominance of kerogen. Hydrocarbon was found in the Dai Hung field and the Dua field during explorations in the 1970s and 1980s with sequence clastic reservoirs containing structural traps style of fault-segmented four-way dip anticlines occurring in the hanging walls of the main faults during the Mid-Miocene period. However, as the Nam Con Son Basin has a complex tectonic setting, the probability of success for commercial discovery is only at 16%.

The Nam Con Son Basin, along with the Malay-Tho Chu Basins, are the two major gas supply caters towards Vietnam's energy demand. One such example is that natural gas from the Nam Con Son Basin and Bạch Hổ oil field is used to fuel the Phú Mỹ Power Plants which provides 40% of Vietnam's total electricity.

Đại Hùng oilfield was discovered in 1988 with an estimated reserves of 354.6 million barrels of oil and 8.482 trillion cubic meters of natural gas. Dai Hung field was one of the first three fields in Vietnam to come on-stream in October 1994 under operator Vietsovpetro. The average production from this field was about 3000 barrels of oil per day and is predicted for abandonment in 2025.

=== Source rock, reservoir, seal and trap ===
The source rock were developed in the Oligocene and Miocene and are widely distributed throughout the basin with a dominance of parabolic coal mud rocks.

Reservoir rock are typically by quartz sandstones, limestone and poly-mineral sandstones with reservoir thickness between 2m and 80m.

Cap rocks in the Nam Con Son Basin consist of thin siltstone and sandstone with a good local and regional seal. The regional seal are the Lower Miocene shelf mudstones located in the south east Nam Con Son Basin there is a potential for both structural and stratigraphical traps. The trapping styles are dominantly three-way dip and fault, and two-way drip and two faults, closures.
