= Vietnamese frigate Ly Thai To =

Military ship

History

Vietnam
- Name: Lý Thái Tổ
- Namesake: Lý Thái Tổ
- Builder: Zelenodolsk Factory
- Cost: Around $150 million
- Launched: 13 March 2011
- Identification: 012
- Status: In service

General characteristics
- Class & type: Gepard-class frigate
- Displacement: 1,500 tons (standard); 1,930 tons (full load)
- Length: 102.14 m (335.1 ft) (93.5 m (307 ft) waterline)
- Beam: 13.09 m (42.9 ft)
- Draught: 5.3 m (17 ft)
- Propulsion: 2 shaft CODOG, Two gas turbines (29,300 shp (21,800 kW) each), 1 Type 61D Diesel (8,000 bhp (6,000 kW)), 3 600 kW diesel alternator sets
- Speed: 28 knots (52 km/h; 32 mph)
- Range: 4,000 nmi (7,000 km) at 10 knots (19 km/h)
- Endurance: 15 days
- Complement: 98
- Sensors & processing systems: Radar:Navigation radar (unknown type), Cross Dome surface & air search radar, Pop Group SA-N-4 fire control radar, Bass Stand cruise missile target designator, Bass Tilt AK-630 fire-control; Sonar:Medium-frequency hull mounted
- Electronic warfare & decoys: Electronic Warfare:2 Bell Shroud passive intercept, 2 Bell Squat jammers, 4 16-barreled Pk-16 countermeasure rocket launchers
- Armament: 8 SS-N-25 Switchblade Anti-Ship missiles (two quadruple launchers); 1 × Palma (Kashtan export variant) gun/missile system; 1 76.2 mm 59-caliber AK–176 automatic dual-purpose gun (500-round magazine); 2 6-barreled 30 mm AK-630 point-defense guns (2,000-round magazine for each)
- Aircraft carried: 1 x Kamov Ka-27

Vietnam People's Navy Ship 012–Lý Thái Tổ is a Gepard-class frigate (Gepard 3.9 type) in the Vietnam People's Navy. She was built by the Zelenodolsk shipyard in Russia under signed contract to the Vietnamese Navy.

== Design and description ==
Lý Thái Tổ is designed to perform searches, track and destroy floating target ships, air defense, anti-submarine (limited), escort, and patrol territorial waters and special areas with economic rights. Lý Thái Tổ can enter combat independently or in squadrons, and is equipped with stealth technology, to present a minimum presence on enemy radar screens.

Vietnam and Russia signed a contract worth US$350 million to build two Gepard-class frigates designed by the Institute ZPKB in Zelenodolsk.

According to the manufacturer, Lý Thái Tổ's interior has been modified to increase crew comfort, improved compared to Đinh Tiên Hoàng – the previous Gepard 3.9 in Vietnam People's Navy. She has more convenient maintenance and operation, improved seaworthiness, higher maneuverability, and is better able to handle a range of situations.

== Construction and career ==
Lý Thái Tổ, launched on 16 March 2011, was named after Lý Thái Tổ, the Đại Việt emperor and founder of the Lý dynasty, who reigned from 1009 AD to 1028 AD.

Lý Thái Tổ visited Indonesia from 12 to 15 November, Brunei from 19 to 21 November and the Philippines from 24 to 26 November 2014.
