= Manufacturing in Vietnam =

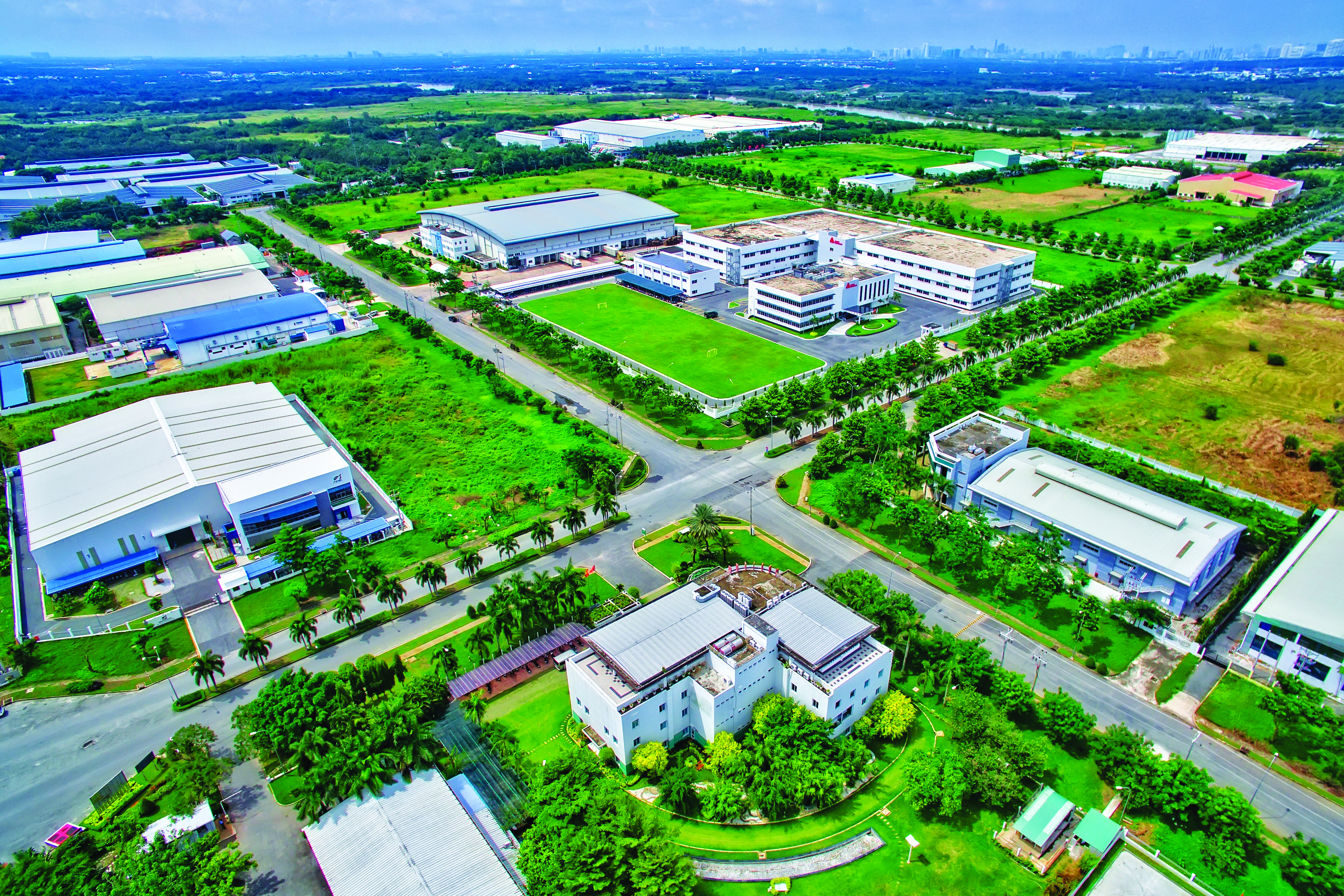
Long Hậu Industrial Zone, south of HCMC

Manufacturing in Vietnam after reunification followed a pattern that was initially the reverse of the record in agriculture; it showed recovery from a depressed base in the early postwar years. However, this recovery stopped in the late 1970s as the war in Cambodia and the threat from China caused the government to redirect food, finance, and other resources to the military. This move worsened shortages and intensified old bottlenecks. At the same time, the invasion of Cambodia cost Vietnam urgent foreign economic support. China's attack on Vietnam in 1979 compounded industrial problems by damaging important industrial facilities in the North, particularly a major steel plant and an apatite mine.

== National objectives ==
National leadership objectives during the immediate postwar period included consolidating the Northern factories and workshops that had been scattered and hidden during the war to improve their chances of survival and nationalizing banks and significant factories in the South to bring the financial and industrial sectors under state control. The government's continued use of wartime planning mechanisms that prioritized output targets over production or long-term costs caused profits to erode and increased the government's financial burdens.

== Economic reforms ==
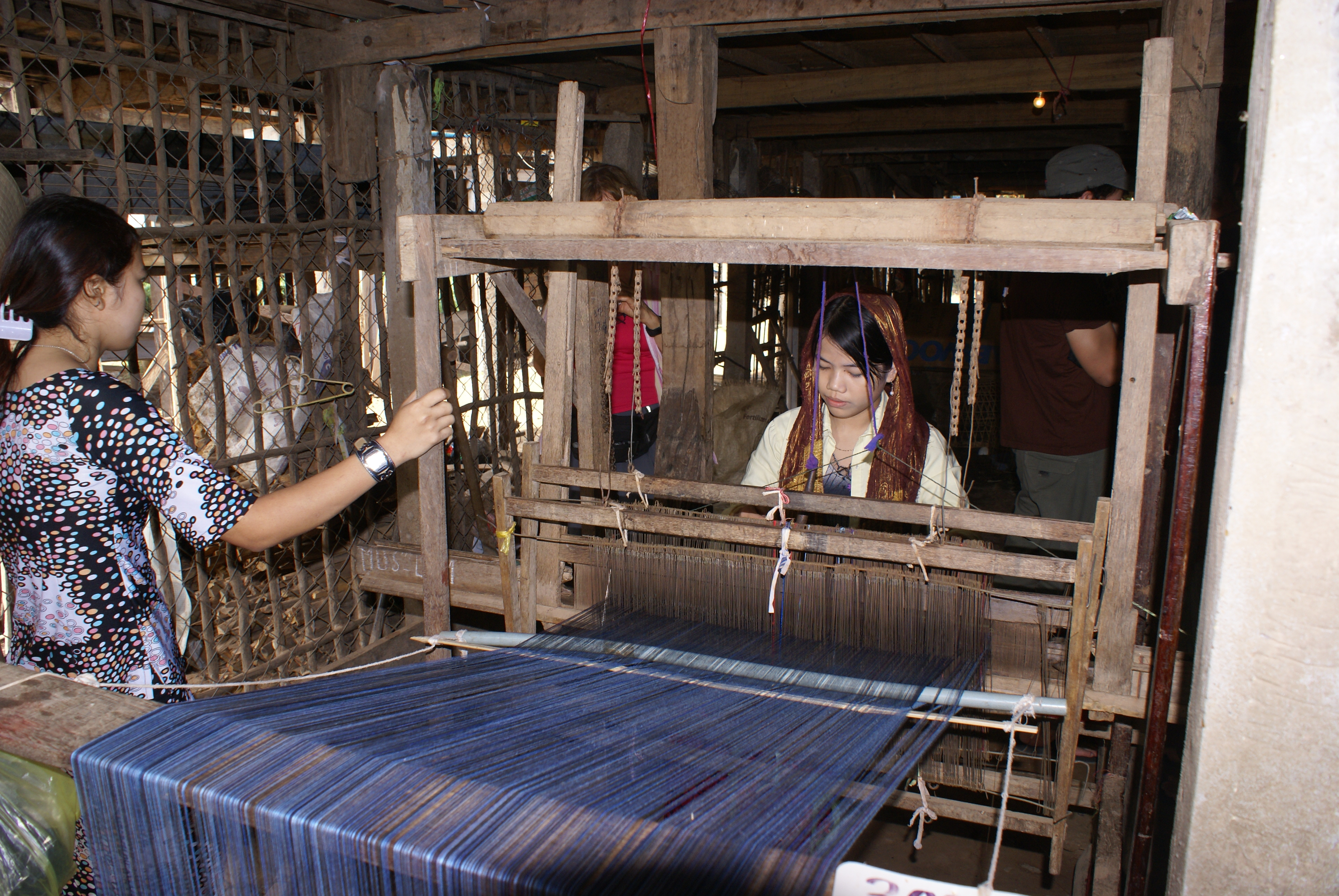
A woman at a loom in Chau Doc, Vietnam

The economic reforms undertaken in 1977 gave factory management some independence in formulating production plans, arranging production resources, and containing production expenses. Additional pragmatic steps were also considered, such as adopting incentive-structured wages and realigning prices to reflect production costs better.

This first experiment with reform was relatively short-lived. This was partly because it ran counter to the overriding policy of socializing the South and integrating it with the North by reducing the centralized administrative control needed to do the job. However, some reform measures stayed on the books and were revived in the 1980s.

Following the Đổi Mới reforms in 1986, the Vietnamese economy transformed from a centrally planned economy to an export oriented economy, with the lifting of export quotas, the reduction of export taxes to low levels, and the encouragement of export activities by the private sector as part of these reforms. This ended the trade monopoly of a handful of state-owned enterprises, and led to a flourishing of the private sector. These reforms were paired with concomitant supervision and regulation, permitting for a rapid growth in its exports and imports.

== Statistics ==
Vietnamese statistics indicate that the gross value of industrial output in 1980 was not much higher than in 1976 and that output per capita declined more than 8 percent. For example, cement production was relatively stagnant; it averaged 1.7 million tons annually during the Second Five-Year Plan, but only 1.4 million tons in 1985.

An estimated 86 percent of Vietnam’s export merchandise came from the manufacturing sector in 2022, compared to just 49 percent in 2002. These exports have increased in value too. In 2002, Vietnam exported goods and services to the tune of US$19.19 billion. In 2022, that number had climbed to US$384.22 billion.

== Industrial production ==
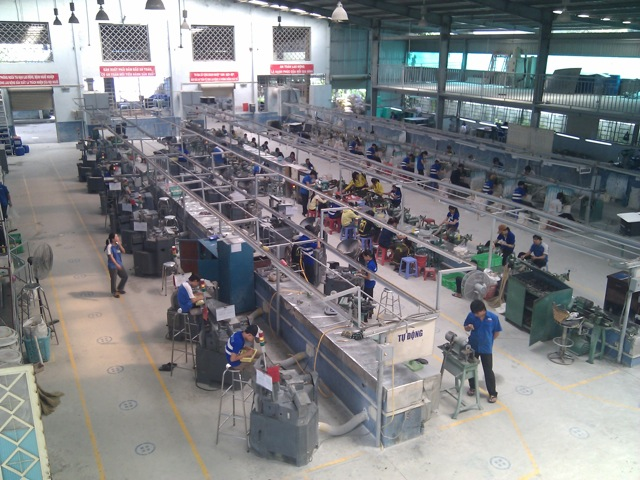
Garment button factory in Vietnam

Some light industry and handicrafts sectors mirrored the difficulties experienced in agriculture because they used agricultural raw materials. By 1980 the Vietnamese press reported that many grain, food-product, and consumer-goods processing enterprises had reduced production or ceased operations entirely. Although detailed statistics on sector performance were insufficient to show annual results, the total value of light industry output peaked in 1978; by 1980, it was nearly 3 percent lower than in 1976. Increasingly severe shortages of food (particularly grain and fish) and industrial consumer goods lessened workers' incentives.

Total industrial production during the Third Five-Year Plan reflected high levels of investment, averaging some 40 percent of total annual investment during the plan period. In 1985 the industrial sector accounted for some 32 percent of national income, up from approximately 20 percent in 1980.

From 1981 through 1985, industrial growth was unevenly distributed and, in many instances, restored production levels to their 1976 levels. The highest production growth rates were recorded in producing paper products (32 percent per year) and food processing (42 percent per year). Both sectors had declined in production during the Second Five-Year Plan. Production of processed sugar increased from 271,000 tons in 1981 to 434,000 tons in 1985, almost ten times the 1975 production level. The processing of ocean fish increased from 385,000 tons in 1980 to 550,000 tons in 1985, not quite reaching 1976 and 1977 levels but reversing the steady decline this sector had experienced in the late 1970s. (The decline had been partly generated by using fishing boats in the South as escape craft to flee the communist regime.) Other light industries grew at 10 percent or more annual rates during the early 1980s, restoring production to 1975 or 1976 levels. Brick production increased steadily to 3.7 billion bricks in 1985, after regular declines during the previous plan. Production of glass reached 41,000 tons in 1985, exceeding 1975 levels for the first time. Paper production in 1985 again reached the 1976 level of 75,000 tons, up from 42,000 tons at the beginning of the plan in 1981, and the textile subsector exhibited an 8-percent average annual growth rate during the plan period as cloth production more than doubled to 380 million square meters in 1985.

Among heavy industries, machine-building and chemical industries (including rubber) registered annual average production gains of approximately 25 percent. Chemical fertilizer production continued to exceed the 1975 level and, in 1985, reached 516,000 tons despite relatively underdeveloped mining and enrichment processes for apatite and pyrite ore and underutilization of the Lam Thao Superphosphate of Lime plant (Vinh Phu Province).

Vietnam took advantage of its comparative advantage in labour intensive industries through light industry to lead its rapid growth, particularly through the textiles and footwear sectors. Light industry between 1992 and 1997 rose from 13% to 37% of total exports, of which the textiles and footwear industry accounted for 16% and 11% of total exports in 1997. At the same time, the total value of exports also trebled from US$2.58B in 1992 to US$9.19B in 1997, with trade (export and import) accounting for 52% and 86% in 1992 and 1997 respectively. Vietnam had also begun producing and exporting electronics and computers goods during this period, with Fujitsu beginning PCB mounting and production in 1995 and 1996 respectively. Growth in these sectors eventually accounted for 5.1% of total exports in both 1998 and 1999, with its total value reaching US$473.93M in 1998 and US$585.1M in 1999.

By the 2010s, Vietnam had moved further up the electronics and semiconductor value chain, with the opening of an Intel assembly and test facility in Ho Chi Minh City that was then Intel's largest such facility, to produce chipsets for laptops and mobile devices. This was followed by a further investment from Intel in Vietnam in 2021 at the same facility to further expand its facilities. In that same year, Vietnam had a total of 50 chip design companies, and 7 assembly, packaging, and testing facilities. Vietnam's semiconductor exports that year accounted for 7% of its total exports, with these exports accounting for 2% of global semiconductor export value, while ICT goods exports accounted for 38% of its total exports..

== Working conditions and industrial relations ==
Workers in Vietnam are represented by the Vietnam General Confederation of Labour (VGCL). This is the only trade union in the country. The VGLC is involved in key negotiations between workers and their employers including wages and working conditions. The VGLC recorded a total of 157 incidents of workers taking strike action in 2022, with a number of these strikes involving foreign invested firms.

She is a feature documentary film directed by Italian filmmaker and anthropologist Parsifal Reparato, showing the working conditions for women working in the large electronic components factory in Vietnam. They work 12-hour shifts around the clock.

== Current status ==
Although the industry contributed 40.1 percent of gross domestic product (GDP) in 2004, it employed only 12.9 percent of the workforce. In 2000, 22.4 percent of industrial production was attributable to non-state activities. During 1994–2004, the industrial GDP grew at an average annual rate of 10.3 percent. Manufacturing contributed 20.3 percent of GDP in 2004 while employing 10.2 percent of the workforce. During 1994–2004, the manufacturing GDP grew at an average annual rate of 11.2 percent. The manufacturing sectors—food processing, cigarettes and tobacco, textiles, chemicals, and electrical goods—proliferated. Almost a third of manufacturing and retail activity is concentrated in Ho Chi Minh City.

Total industry output from 2007 was 574,047 billion VND (+17.1% year on year), in which state-owned enterprises grew +10.3% year on year and accounted for 24% of total industry output. The fastest growing industries were car manufacturing +52.2%, machine tools +69.8%, and air conditioning +51.9%.

In 2017, Vingroup started VINFAST Automobile Production Complex project in Dinh Vu - Cat Hai Economic Zone.

As of the end of the June 2024, the average wage of a worker in the industry and construction sector in Vietnam was VND 8,300,000 (US$328.26) per month.

In January 2026, Vietnam announced the construction of its first semiconductor chip manufacturing plant Hòa Lạc Hi-Tech Park in Hanoi led by Viettel, targetting a completion of the plant and trial production of chips on the 32 nm process by the end of 2027. First promulgated in 2024, this plant represents one of the key objectives in Vietnam's semiconductor industry development plan to 2030, amongst other objectives of attracting foreign direct investment to establish at least 100 chip design companies and 10 packaging and testing plants. As the first semiconductor fab in-country, this fab's completion will fully integrate the entire production chain within Vietnam.

== See also ==
- Agriculture in Vietnam
- Economy of Vietnam
