= Vietnamese frigate Dinh Tien Hoang =

2010 Gepard-class frigate

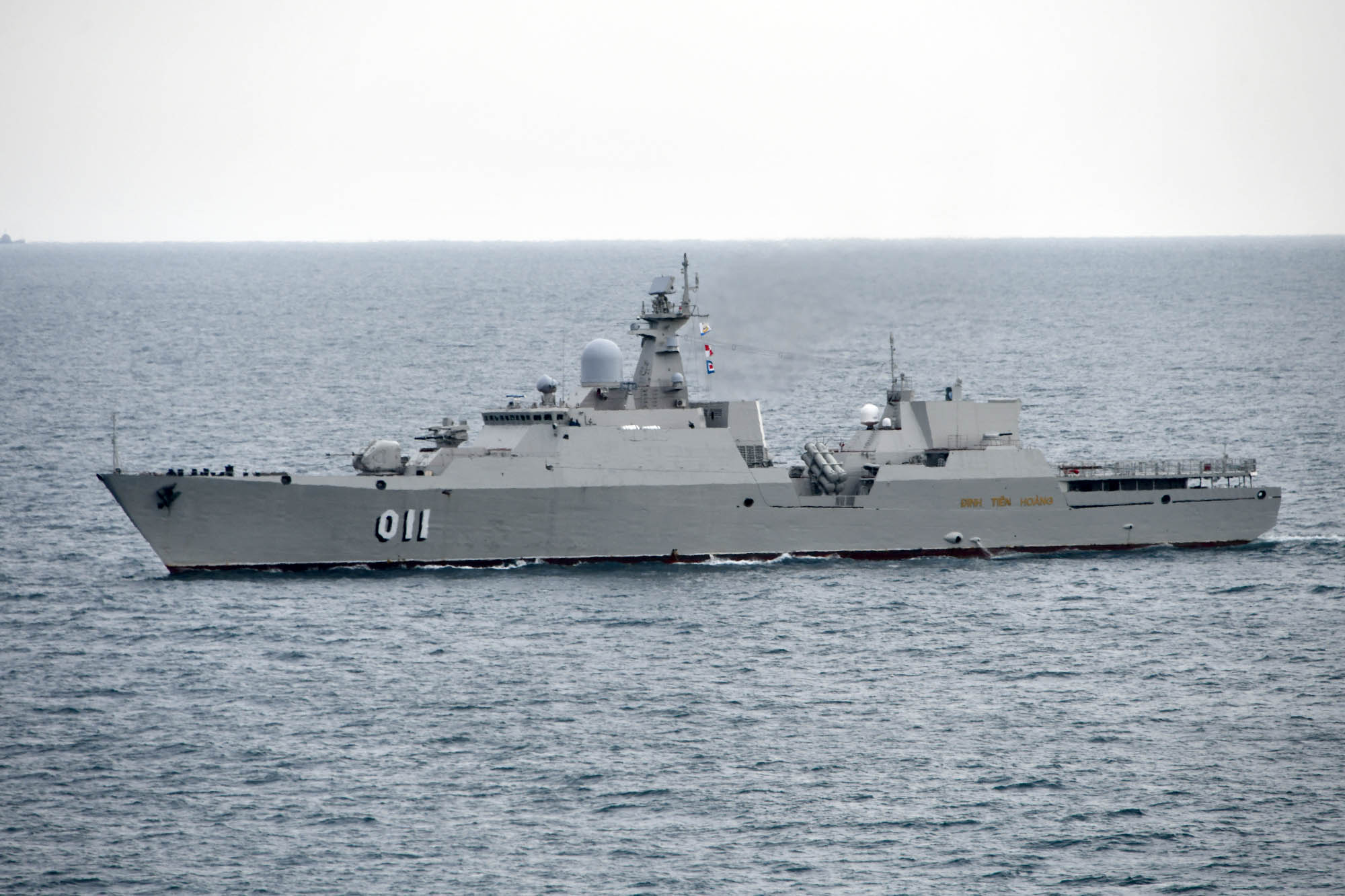
- Đinh Tiên Hoàng underway in 2021

History

Vietnam
- Name: Đinh Tiên Hoàng
- Namesake: Đinh Tiên Hoàng
- Builder: Zelenodolsk Factory
- Cost: $175 million
- Launched: 12 December 2010
- Identification: 011
- Status: in active service

General characteristics
- Class & type: Gepard-class frigate
- Displacement: 2,100 tons
- Length: 102.14 m (335.1 ft) (93.5 m (307 ft) waterline)
- Beam: 13.09 m (42.9 ft)
- Draught: 5.3 m (17 ft)
- Propulsion: 2 shaft CODOG, Two gas turbines (29,300 shp (21,800 kW) each), 1 Type 61D Diesel (8,000 bhp (6,000 kW)), 3 600 kW diesel alternator sets
- Speed: 28 knots (52 km/h; 32 mph)
- Range: 4,000 nmi (7,000 km) at 10 knots (19 km/h)
- Endurance: 15-20 days
- Complement: 98
- Sensors & processing systems: Radar:Navigation radar (unknown type), Cross Dome surface & air search radar, Bass Stand cruise missile target designator, Bass Tilt AK-630 fire-control; Sonar:None
- Electronic warfare & decoys: Electronic Warfare:2 Bell Shroud passive intercept, 2 Bell Squat jammers, 4 16-barreled Pk-16 countermeasure rocket launchers
- Armament: 8 SS-N-25 Switchblade Anti-Ship missiles (two quadruple launchers); 1 × Palma (Kashtan export variant) gun/missile system; 1 76.2 mm 59-caliber AK–176 automatic dual-purpose gun (500-round magazine); 2 6-barreled 30 mm AK-630 point-defense guns (2,000-round magazine for each); 12–20 mines
- Aircraft carried: 1 x Kamov Ka-27

Vietnam People's Navy Ship 011–Đinh Tiên Hoàng is the first Gepard-class frigate (Gepard 3.9 type) in the Vietnam People's Navy (VPN). The VPN contracted the Zelenodolsk shipyard in Russia to build the ship.

== Design and description ==
Đinh Tiên Hoàng (HQ-011) is designed to perform search tasks, track and destroy floating target ships, air defense, anti-submarine (limited), escort, and patrol territorial waters and special areas with economic rights. The ship can enter combat independently or in squadrons, and is equipped with stealth technology, to present a minimum presence on enemy radar screens.

Vietnam and Russia signed a contract on 12 May 2006 worth US$350 million to build two Gepard-class frigates designed by the Institute ZPKB in Zelenodolsk.

At the request of the Vietnam People's Navy the ship known as Project 11661 was completely redesigned to become Gepard 3.9. The redesigned ships include stealth technology and the most advanced weapons available from Russia today, including air defense systems, Palma Close-in weapon system AK-630, Kh-35 anti-ship missiles, and Kamov Ka-27 helicopters. These two ships are the latest generation of the Gepard class produced at the Zelenodolsk plant. It took two years to build the prototypes under Project 11661.

== Construction and career ==
Đinh Tiên Hoàng was launched on 12 December 2010. The ship is named after Đinh Tiên Hoàng, the first Vietnamese emperor following the defeat of the Twelve Warlords. He was the founder of the short-lived Đinh dynasty and a significant figure in the establishment of Vietnamese political unity in the tenth century.

Đinh Tiên Hoàng visited Indonesia from 12 to 15 November, Brunei from 19 to 21 November and the Philippines from 24 to 26 November 2014.

Đinh Tiên Hoàng engaged in an exchange with Singapore's naval force from 23 to 26 January 2016 and participated in the International Fleet Review 2016 in early February.
