= List of equipment of the Vietnam People's Navy =

The Vietnam People's Navy is the naval and maritime branch of the Vietnam People's Army. Since the Vietnam War, most of Vietnamese vessels were supplied by the Soviet Union and presently by Russia, while hundreds more were integrated into the navy after it was left over from South Vietnam although many have been decommissioned due to lack of parts. However, due to rising tensions in the South China Sea, many nearby nations such as Japan have shown support in developing Vietnam's Navy and Coast Guard.

== Submarines ==
Image	Model	Type	Ship	Quantity	Origin	Notes
	Kilo (Project 636.1)	Attack submarine	Hà Nội (182) Thành phố Hồ Chí Minh (183) Hải Phòng (184) Khánh Hoà (185) Đà Nẵng (186) Bà Rịa-Vũng Tàu (187)	6	Russia	Delivered from 2013 to 2017. Armed with 3M14E land attack and 3M54E1 or 3M54E anti-ship Klub-S missiles.
	TN-75	Midget submarine		1	Vietnam	75 ton design.
	Pluto Plus	Unmanned underwater vehicle			Italy	Used for minesweeping and deployed from minesweepers.

== Surface vessels ==
=== Frigates ===
Image	Model	Type	Ship	Quantity	Origin	Notes
	Gepard 3.9 (Project 11661E)	Guided-missile frigate	Đinh Tiên Hoàng (011) Lý Thái Tổ (012)	2	Russia	Delivered in 2011. Not armed with torpedoes.
	Gepard 3.9 (Project 11661E)	Guided-missile frigate	Trần Hưng Đạo (015) Quang Trung (016)	2	Russia	Delivered in 2017–2018. Armed with torpedoes.
	Petya-II (Project 159A)	Anti-submarine frigate	13 15 17	3	Soviet Union	Former Soviet Navy. Delivered 1983–1984.
	Petya-III (Project 159AE)	Anti-submarine frigate	9 11	2	Soviet Union	Former Soviet Navy. Delivered 1978.

=== Corvettes ===
Image	Class	Type	Ship	Quantity	Origin	Notes
	Pohang (Flight III)	Anti-submarine corvette	18 20	2	Korea	Delivered in 2017, 2018. Armed with anti-ship missiles.
	Pohang (Flight IV)	Anti-submarine corvette	21	1	Korea	Delivered in 2025.
	Khukri	Guided-missile corvette	26	1	India	Former Indian Navy. Delivered in 2023.
	BPS-500	Guided-missile corvette	381	1	Vietnam	Designed by the Severnoye Design Bureau based on the Pauk-class corvette. Assembled in Vietnam from a Russian kit. Became operational in 2001.
	PS-500 upgrade	Guided-missile corvette	A2 A3 A4 A5 A6	0 (+5)	Vietnam	The displaces is around 850t Designed by the Vietnam Naval Technical Institute base on BPS-500. First ship, A2, began construction at the Ba Son Shipyard in October 2025 with an expected delivery in September 2028.
	Tarantul-I (Project 1241.RE)	Corvette	371 372 373 374	4	Russia	Delivered in 1996 and 1999.
	Molniya (Project 1241.8)	Corvette	375 376 377 378 379 380 382 383	8	RussiaVietnam	Delivered from 2008 to 2016. 6 built under license in Vietnam at the Ba Son Shipyard.

=== Fast attack and patrol ships ===
Image	Model	Type	Ship	Quantity	Origin	Notes
	KN-750	Patrol boat / Gunboat		1	Vietnam	Transferred from Vietnam Fisheries Surveillance to 413th Naval Squadron, 955th Brigade
	TP-01	Patrol boat / Gunboat		2		
	TT-400TP	Patrol boat / Gunboat	272 275	6	Vietnam	Built by Hong Ha Shipbuilding Company (Vietnam). Based on a foreign design.
	Svetlyak (Project 1041.2)	Patrol boat / Gunboat		6	Russia	
	Turya (Project 206M)	Torpedo boat	331 332 333 334 335	5	Soviet Union	The Soviet Union supplied 5 Project 206M from 1984 to 1986; possibly ex-Soviet Navy. As of 2026, none may be serviceable; two armed only with guns.
	Osa (Project 205U)	Missile boat	354 355 356 357	4	Soviet Union	
	Osa (Project 205ER)	Missile boat	358 359 360 361	4	Soviet Union	

=== Minesweepers ===
Image	Model	Type	Ship	Quantity	Origin	Notes
	Yurka (Project 266)	Minesweeper	851 852	2	Soviet Union	
	Sonya (Project 1265)	Minesweeper	861 862 863 864	4	Soviet Union	
	Yevgenya (Project 1258)	Minesweeper	815 816	2	Soviet Union	

=== Amphibious warfare ships ===
Image	Model	Type	Ship	Quantity	Origin	Notes
	LST-938	Tank landing ship	501 503	2	United States; Vietnam (maintenance, parts replaced)	The former USS Maricopa County (LST-938) and USS Coconino County (LST-603) which were captured during the Vietnam War. Overhauled at Factory X51. Maximum 4,145 tons.
	VDC-01	Tank landing ship		1	Vietnam	A product of the Vietnam Military Ship Design Institute based on the Polish-designed Polnocny-B class with upgrades
	Polnocny-B (Project 771)	Tank landing ship	511 512 513	3	Poland	Currently being researched and manufactured. Maximum 834 tons.
	Damen Stan Lander 5612	Roll-on/roll-off & Logistic-support landing ship	526 527 528 529	4	Netherlands; Vietnam	Domestically manufactured. 3 ships were produced for the Venezuelan government but were not delivered due to payment problems. The ships were repurchased from Venezuela's order. Another ship was ordered and transferred to the Vietnamese Navy. Maximum 1,480 tons.
	Hùng Vương	Roll-on/roll-off & Logistic-support landing ship	521 522	2	Vietnam	Maximum 600 tons.
	LCU 1466	Landing craft	551 552 553 554 555 556	6	United States	Captured during the Vietnam War. Maximum ~359-392 tons.
	LCM-8	Landing craft	466 467 470 471	4-6	United States	Captured during the Vietnam War. Unclear how many there are, but the known ship designations are 466, 467, 470, and 471. Maximum 113.2 tons.
	ST1200	Landing craft			Vietnam	Designated as a platoon amphibious ship. Designed and built by Z189 Shipyard
	ST-2300	Landing craft			Vietnam	Maximum 80 tons. Designed and built by Hải Son single-member LLC (military designation Factory X50).
	HSC-60	Landing craft			Vietnam	Maximum 17 tons, can transport up to 22 person.

=== Transport / logistics support ===
Image	Model	Type	Ship	Quantity	Origin	Notes
Transport / Logistics Support
	K-122	Transport / Logistics support ship	Trường Sa (571)	1	Vietnam	
	K-123	Logistics support / Hospital ship	Khánh Hòa - 01 (561)	1	Vietnam	
	Trường Sa	Transport / Logistics support ship	Trường Sa MT.01		Vietnam	
	HQ-996	Transport / Logistics support ship	996	1	Vietnam	
	HQ-905	Replenishment oiler	905	1	Vietnam	Maximun 3,000 tons.
	ST194	Transport/patrol ship			Vietnam	Designed and built by Z189 Shipyard
Search-and-Rescue Ship
	Damen RGS 9316	Submarine rescue ship	Yết Kiêu (927)	1 (+1)	Netherlands; Vietnam	Two more similar ships were designed by Damen built by Z189 Shipyard, MV Stoker and MV Besant. These ships are slightly smaller and lighter. On March 7, 2025, Song Thu Corporation in Da Nang city held a ceremony to sign the contract to build the second Submarine rescue ship. The ship being constructed is similar to the ones designed and built Australia. Maximum 3,950 tons.
	FET 10-meter Submarine Rescue Vehicle	Deep-submergence rescue vehicle	Yết Kiêu (927)	1 (+1)	United Kingdom	Equipped with Deep-submergence rescue vehicle, Remotely operated under water vehicle, and 2 small-size speed boats. Has a decompression chamber and enhanced on-board medical facilities.
	Perry® XLX-C Remotely Operated Vehicle	Remotely operated underwater vehicle	Yết Kiêu (927)	1 (+1)	United Kingdom	Equipped with Deep-submergence rescue vehicle, Remotely operated under water vehicle, and 2 small-size speed boats. Has a decompression chamber and enhanced on-board medical facilities.
	Rescue Boat ST1200CN	Speed boat	Yết Kiêu (927)	4	Netherlands; Vietnam	Equipped with Deep-submergence rescue vehicle, Remotely operated under water vehicle, and 2 small-size speed boats. Has a decompression chamber and enhanced on-board medical facilities.
	HSV-6613	Ocean surveillance	Trần Đại Nghĩa (888)	1	Netherlands; Vietnam	Designed by Damen and constructed by Song Thu Corporation. Maximum 1,550 tons.
	Professor Gagarinsky	Research vessel	Giáo sư Gagarinsky (889)	1	Russia; Vietnam	Handed over by Russia to Vietnam on May 11, 2025. Maximum 329 tons.
	FC-624	Fast-react search-and-rescue & Patrol vessel	924	1	Vietnam	Equipped with a speed boat and helipad as its notable features. Locally manufactured by X51 Shipyard. Maximum 700 tons.
	HQ-954	Search-and-rescue vessel	954	1	Vietnam	

=== Training vessel ===
Image	Model	Type	Ship	Quantity	Origin	Notes
		Training Vessel	Lê Quý Đôn (286)	1	Poland	

== Aircraft ==
=== Fixed-wing aircraft ===
Image	Model	Type	Variants	Quantity	Origin	Notes
	DHC-6 Twin Otter	Transport aircraft Maritime patrol aircraft	DHC-6-400	3 3	Canada	3 transports delivered in 2012 and 2013. 3 Guardian 400 maritime patrol aircraft delivered in 2014.

=== Helicopter ===
Image	Model	Type	Variants	Quantity	Origin	Notes
	Eurocopter EC225 Super Puma	Utility	H225	2	France	
	Kamov Ka-32	Utility		2	Soviet Union	By 2021, one Ka-32T lost in an accident and one in service.
Kamov_Ka-27M_‘RF-19188_-_31_yellow’_(36920738686)	Kamov Ka-27	ASW Helicopter	Ka-28	8	Soviet Union	

== Unmanned aerial vehicles ==
Image	Model	Type	Variant	Quantity	Origin	Notes
	IAI Heron	MALE UAV	Heron Mk1 Heron Mk2	3	Israel	Heron Mk2 equipped with ELM-2022 radar used for maritime patrol.
	Insitu ScanEagle	Reconnaissance		6	United States	
	Orbiter 2	Reconnaissance		5-8	Israel	Acquired from Israel. Used for artillery reconnaissance for the 685th Coastal Missile Brigade.
	VUA SC-3G	Reconnaissance			Vietnam	Currently, the VUA SC-3G is being used by the 954th Naval Air Brigade and the Vietnam Border Guard.

== Radar systems ==
Image	Model	Type	Variant	Quantity	Origin	Notes
	VRS-CSX	X-Band Medium-Range Coastal Surveillance Radar			Vietnam	Detect targets at sea and those flying at a low altitude. Produced and developed by Viettel.
	VRS-SRX	X-Band Short-Range High Resolution Coastal Surveillance Radar			Vietnam	Detect targets at sea and those flying at a low altitude. Produced and developed by Viettel.
	Coast Watcher 100				France	
	SCORE-3000				France	

== Munitions ==
=== Anti-ship missile (AShM) ===
Image	Model	Type	Variant	Quantity	Origin	Notes
	VCM-01	Anti-ship missile	VSM-01A VCM-01 VCM-02		Vietnam	~80–300 km range. A part of the VCS-01 mobile coastal defense system. Launched from the VCM-B coastal defense missile system. Domestically manufactured by Viettel Aerospace (VTX).
	Kh-35 Uran	Anti-ship missile	Kh-35E Kh-35EMV	310	Russia	
	3M-14/54 Club-S	Anti-ship missile	3M-54E/E1 3M-14E 91RE1/RE2	50	Russia	Equipped in Kilo submarines. 50 on order.
	P-800 Oniks	Anti-ship missile	K-310 Yakhont	40	Russia	Used with the K-300P Bastion-P coastal missile systems. Two K-300P Bastion-P systems in active.
	P-5 Pyatyorka	Anti-ship missile	SS-N-3 Shaddock P-28 P-28M	25	Soviet Union	Equipping 4K44 Redut missile systems. Components are maintained, overhauled, replaced and modernized locally.
	P-15 Termit	Anti-ship missile	P-15 P-27		Soviet Union	Used on Tarantul-I and Khukri.

=== Torpedo ===
Image	Model	Type	Variant	Quantity	Origin	Notes
	Type 53 torpedo	Torpedo	SET-53 SET-40 53-65 TEST-71	160 110;	RussiaVietnam	SET-53 was used by Petya-class frigate, meanwhile the 53-65 used by Kilo-class submarine and SET-40 used by the TN-75 light submarine. 110 TEST-71 missiles were delivered between 2013 and 2018. Already domestically produced.
	VA-111 Shkval	Torpedo	Shkval-E		Russia	Equipped with Kilo-class submarine.
	TE-2	Torpedo	TE-2-01		Russia	Used by Gepard-class frigate.

=== Naval mine ===
Image	Model	Type	Variant	Quantity	Origin	Notes
	KMP	Naval Mine			Soviet Union; Vietnam (maintenance, parts replaced)	Received as aid from the Soviet Union. Operating on the principle of contact and detonation with automatic depth control capabilities, this device uses various lowering methods with a maximum height of 1.5m. The X-28 plant was produced based on the KMP prototype.
	UDM	Naval Mine			Soviet Union	A non-contact naval mine deployed in defensive minefields to destroy enemy surface ships at depths of 12-50m and submarines at depths up to 125m.The X-28 plant was produced based on the UDM prototype.

== Personal equipment ==
=== Combat helmet / helmet accessories ===
Image	Name	Type	Variant	Origin	Notes
	Modular Integrated Communications Helmet	Combat Helmet		United States Vietnam	Vietnamese copy. Used by People's Army of Vietnam Special Forces, police, and infantry soldiers. Manufactured locally at Factory Z176.
	Type High Cut Helmet	Combat Helmet		United States Vietnam	Vietnamese copy. Used by People's Army of Vietnam Special Forces, police, and future infantry soldiers. Manufactured locally at Factory Z176.
	PASGT Helmet	Combat Helmet		United States Vietnam	Limited use with Special Forces, Border Guards, and the Navy. They are gradually replacing older helmets in all branches of the Army. Most helmets are a Vietnamese-made version of the PASGT Helmet. Earlier models were imported from Israel.
	Type A2 Helmet	Combat helmet		Vietnam	The PAVN's standard issue bump shell is a hard plastic replica of the PASGT helmets. It is used for training exercises and combat drill.
	Vietnamese Pith Helmet	Helmet		Vietnam	Traditional standard issue hard hat, used as the army's utility and barracks cover. Commonly worn by enlisted members with their dress uniforms and during light training.
	SSh-68	Combat Helmet		Soviet Union	Limited use.
	OD2M Night Vision Monocular	Night-vision device		Vietnam	Used by People's Army of Vietnam Special Forces.
	MV5	Gas Mask		Vietnam	

=== Body armor ===
Image	Name	Type	Origin	Details
	AG K51T Body Armour	Body armor	Vietnam	Introduced in International Army Game's exhibition. The vest is equipped with armor plates capable of withstanding 7.62×25mm lead-core rounds.
	AG K53T Body Armour	Body armor	Vietnam	Introduced in International Army Game's exhibition. The vest is equipped with armor plates capable of withstanding 7,62×51mm amour-piercing round.
	7.62 K56 Body Armour	Body armor	Vietnam	Introduced in International Army Game's exhibition. The vest is equipped with armor plates capable of withstanding 7.62×39 rounds.
	K23 armored vest	Body armor	Vietnam	Modern battle uniform for standard Vietnamese infantry featuring the capacity to carry 3 magazines, 4 hand grenades, and 4 rounds of 40mm grenade launcher ammunition. It is integrated with the MOLLE system and can accommodate 4 armor plates, including 2 hard plates and 2 soft plates. It will be standard issue in the future. Manufactured at the Z176 factory.
	Combat Leather Pads	Knee Pads & Elbow Pads	Vietnam	Standard Issued along with the new K20 military uniform.
	Marom Dolphin Fusion System	Body armor	Israel	Used by Naval Infantry.

=== Camouflage pattern ===
Image	Name	Type	Variant	Origin	Notes
	K07 Navy	Camouflage Pattern		Vietnam	Former standard camo. A variant of the K07 Woodland used by the Ground Forces.
	K17 Navy	Camouflage Pattern		Vietnam	Former standard camo. A variant of the K17 used by the Ground Forces.
	K20 Navy	Camouflage Pattern		Vietnam	The current standard-issue camo. A variant of the K20 used by the Ground Forces.
	Naval Duck Hunter	Camouflage Pattern		Vietnam	Standard camo for the Naval Special Operation Force and the submarine crews.

== Infantry weapons ==
=== Weapons attachment ===
Image	Model	Type	Variant	Origin	Details
Scopes
	ITL MARS	Red dot sight		Israel	Mounted on Uzi, AKM-1, IWI Tavor.
	Meprolight M21	Red dot sight		Israel	Mounted on Uzi, AKM-1, IWI Tavor, STV Rifles and IWI ACE
	Aimpoint PRO	Red dot sight		United States	Mounted on STV Rifles.
	KBN-M1	Red dot sight		Vietnam	Mounted on STV-380. Manufactured locally at Vietnam Defense Industry (VDI).
Under Barrel
	OPL40M	Grenade launcher	SPL40	Vietnam	40 mm Grenade Launcher. Standard issue grenade launcher accompanying the STV-380 rifles.
	M203	Grenade launcher	T-40	United States Vietnam	40 mm Grenade Launcher. Replaces the trigger for a lever. Mounts on the Galil ACE 32, STL-1A, M18, M16A2 and TAR-21. Manufactured locally as T-40 at the Z111 Factory.
	IWI GL 40	Grenade launcher		Israel	Used by Naval Infantry Force.

=== Pistol ===
Image	Model	Type	Caliber	Variant	Origin	Notes
	IWI Jericho 941	Semi-automatic pistol	9×19mm Parabellum		Israel; Vietnam	Limited use in the army and police, they are being manufactured to slowly replace the K54 and K14VN pistols. Manufactured locally at the Z111 Factory.
	Makarov pistol	Semi-automatic pistol	9×18mm Makarov	Type 59 K59 (SN9)	Soviet Union China Vietnam	Used by police officers. Limited use in the army. Manufactured locally as the K59 (SN9). Manufactured locally at Vietnam Defense Industry (VDI).
	TT-33	Semi-automatic pistol	7.62×25mm Tokarev	Type 54/K54 K14 SN7M SN7TD SN7N	Vietnam Soviet Union China Vietnam	Standard issue service pistol (K14NV) used alongside the K54. This model is equipped with a longer barrel, and a double-stack magazine that holds an increased capacity of 13 rounds. Manufactured locally at the Z111 Factory. Standard issue service pistol. Manufactured locally as the K54 (from the Type 54 Chinese TT-33 copy), now being phased out by the new domestic K14. SN7M, SN7TD, and SN7N are all modernized versions of the TT pistols. The SN7M is a basic modernization, SN7TD24 has an integrated silencer, and SN7N has an intrinsic sight. All are manufactured locally at Vietnam Defense Industry (VDI).

=== Submachine gun ===
Image	Model	Type	Caliber	Variant	Origin	Notes
	Uzi Pro	Submachine gun	9×19mm Parabellum		Israel; Vietnam	Used by People's Army of Vietnam Special Forces and Naval Special Operation Force. Manufactured locally at the Z111 Factory.

=== Assault rifle ===
Image	Model	Type	Caliber	Variant	Origin	Notes
STV3801	STV	Assault rifle	7.62×39mm	STV-215 STV-380 STV-022	Vietnam	Standard issue rifle. The STV-215 is the carbine version of the STV-380, it has a barrel length of 215 mm. Developed and manufactured at the Z111 Factory. STV-380 muzzle can now be tweaked with various attachments. Can be equipped with indigenous KBN-M1 Red-dot sight. A PDW variant with no stock, equipped with vertical grip, has picatinny rail around barrel, and seems to have flashlight attachment. Used by military police, guard units, and units not directly engaged in combat. Both manufactured locally at Z111 Factory.
	Galil ACE	Assault rifle	7.62×39mm		Israel; Vietnam	The domestically made version has the charging handles located on the right side similar to traditional AK-47s. They have been replaced as the standard-issue rifle by the domestically manufactured STV-215/STV-380. The majority of them may have been transferred to Laos and since then rarely spotted in Vietnamese service. Manufactured locally at the Z111 Factory.
	AKM	Assault rifle	7.62×39mm	AKMS AKM-1 AKn	Soviet Union; Vietnam	Standard issue rifle. Still being refurbished, old models are being converted to domestic AKM-1/AKn plasticized refurbishment. Succeeded and replaced as the standard-issue rifle by the STV-215/STV-380. Manufactured locally with some new detail.
	IWI Tavor TAR-21	Assault rifle	5.56×45mm NATO		Israel; Vietnam	Used by People's Army of Vietnam Special Forces and Naval Infantry. Manufactured locally.
	M16	Assault rifle	5.56×45mm NATO	M16A2 CAR-15	United States; Vietnam	Upgraded and manufactured locally as the M16A2VN base on M16A1 and M18 with new stock and Picatinny rail. M16A2 used by Coast Guard in small numbers. Used by People's Army of Vietnam Special Forces, Naval Infantry, and Coast Guard. Converted locally as the M18 at the Z111 Factory, manufactured locally as the XM177E2.

=== Machine gun ===
Image	Model	Type	Caliber	Variant	Origin	Notes
	RPD	Light machine gun	7.62×39mm	STrL-D	Soviet Union; Vietnam	Standard issue machine gun, modernized with picatinny and side rails. Manufactured locally at Z111 Factory.
	RPK	Light machine gun	7.62×39mm	RPK	Soviet Union; Vietnam	Standard issue machine gun. Manufactured locally.
	IWI Negev	Light machine gun	5.56×45mm NATO 7.62×39mm	STrL-5.56 STrL-7.62	Israel; Vietnam	Manufactured locally at the Z111 Factory. STrL-5.56 is the exact domestic copy. Uses PKM handle. Manufactured locally at Vietnam Defense Industry (VDI). Domestic copy is designated as STrL-7.62, chambered in 7.62x39mm. Has foldable stock, PKM handle, 1913 picatinny rail, and fluted barrel that can quickly be swapped. Manufactured locally at Z111 Factory.

=== Sniper rifle ===
Image	Model	Type	Caliber	Variant	Origin	Notes
	IWI Galatz	Sniper rifle	7.62×51mm NATO	SBT-7.62VN	Israel; Vietnam	Used by People's Army of Vietnam Special Forces and Naval Infantry. Manufactured locally at the Z111 Factory. SBT-7.62VN has alterations to handguard, grip, stock, etc. The design is based on the SR-99.
	Dragunov SVD	Designated marksman rifle	7.62×54mmR	SBT-7.62M1	Soviet Union; Vietnam	Used by Naval Special Operation Force and Naval Infantry. Manufactured locally at the Z111 Factory. SBT-7.62M1 is the modernized variant.

=== Grenade launcher ===
Image	Model	Type	Caliber	Variant	Origin	Notes
	AGS-30	Automatic grenade launcher	30×29mm Grenade	SPL-30	Russia; Vietnam	Manufactured locally at Z111 Factory as the SPL-30. Unlicensed copy. 29 round capacity.
	AGS-17	Automatic grenade launcher	30×29mm Grenade	SPL-17	Soviet Union; Vietnam	Standard issue. Manufactured locally at the Z125 Factory as the SPL-17.
	Milkor MGL	Grenade launcher	40×46mm Grenade	MGL-VN1 (SPL-6)	South Africa; Vietnam	Used by People's Army of Vietnam Special Forces. Manufactured locally at Vietnam Defense Industry (VDI) as the MGL-VN1 (SPL-6), SPL40L is the industry name. 6 round capacity.
	M79	Grenade launcher	40×46mm Grenade	M79-VN	United States; Vietnam	Standard issue. Manufactured locally at the Z125 Factory as the M79-VN or SPL40 as its industry name.

=== Rocket-propelled grenade (RPG) / anti-armor weapon ===
Image	Model	Type	Caliber	Variant	Origin	Notes
	RPG-7V	Rocket-propelled grenade	40 mm HEAT	RPG7V-VN (SCT-7) SCT-7X	Soviet Union Vietnam	Internally codenamed B-41. Manufactured locally as RPG7V-VN or SCT-7. Can be equipped with indigenous KNND-SCT7 Day-night vision sight. SCT-7X has no rear grip, has a picatinny rail as substitute. Both manufactured at Vietnam Defense Industry (VDI). Able to produce ammunition for launcher at Factory Z144 and Z131. Cost ~$280 for one rocket.
	MATADOR	Anti-armour	90 mm anti-armour		Israel	Used by Naval Infantry Force.
Recoilless Rifle
	SPG-9	Anti-tank recoilless rifle	73 mm HEAT	SPG-9-T2	Soviet Union; Vietnam	Manufactured locally as SPG-9-T2 at Factory Z125 and Vietnam Defense Industry (VDI).
	B-10	Anti-tank recoilless rifle	82 mm HEAT	B10VN	Soviet Union; Vietnam	Manufactured locally as the DKZ82-B10 VN or B10VN for short. More similar to a Type 65 recoilless rifle.

== Ground vehicles ==
Image	Model	Type	Variant	Quantity	Origin	Notes
Tank
	Type-63	Amphibious Light tank			China	
	PT-76	Amphibious Light tank			Soviet Union	
Armoured personnel carrier
	BTR-60	Wheeled armoured personnel carrier			Soviet Union	
Transport
	PTS-M	Tracked amphibious transport			Soviet Union	

== Coastal artillery systems ==
=== Rocket / missile artillery ===
Image	Model	Type	Variant	Quantity	Origin	Notes
	VCS-01 Trường Sơn	Coastal defence missile system			Vietnam	80 – 300 km range, used for coastal defense. Uses VSM-01 missile. Based on KAMAZ-6560 8×8 truck chassis. Weighs around 40 tons and is ready to fire in 10 minutes. Capable of carrying a maximum of 4 missile canisters, although some sources erroneously report a capacity of up to 8.
	ACCULAR	Coastal defence missile system	AccuLAR-160		Israel	100 missiles delivered in 2014–2016.
	EXTRA	Coastal defence missile system			Israel	100 missiles delivered in 2014–2016.
	K-300P Bastion-P	Coastal defence missile system		10 launchers	Russia	120 – 300 km range. Uses P-800 Oniks missile. Two systems were acquired in 2011; a single system consists of 4 TEL along with radars, command, and support vehicles. Mainly used for coastal defense.
	P-15 Termit	Coastal defence missile system	4K51 Rubezh		Soviet Union	
	P-5 Pityorka	Coastal defence missile system	4K44 Redut		Soviet Union	

=== Towed artillery ===
Image	Model	Type	Variant	Quantity	Origin	Notes
	D-44	85 mm field gun			Soviet Union Vietnam	The D-44 may be put into reserves soon as the ammunition it uses is unconventional and not standardized. The production of this ammo type will cease in the future and so will the service of the D-44.
	M-46	130 mm field gun	M-46 M-47		Soviet Union	While the current number in service is unclear, the Soviet Union provided 519 pieces of the M-46 from 1968 to 1973. Some were most likely lost in combat or taken out of service over the years. Efforts be made to produce projectile that extends the range from 27 km to 30–40 km.

== Former equipment ==
=== Surface vessel ===
Image	Model	Type	Variant	Quantity	Origin	Notes
Surface Vessel
	Komar	Missile boat		4	Soviet Union	Discontinued in the 1980s
	Shantou	Gunboat			China	Used in Gulf of Tonkin incident
	P 4-class torpedo boat	Torpedo boat	T-333 T-336 T-339	12	China	Used in Vietnam War
	Barnegat	Patrol boat	01 (ex-Absecon)	1	United States	Captured in 1975. The ship was decommissioned in the 2000s, and the entire system was dismantled.
	Edsall class	Destroyer Escort	03 ex-Forster	1	United States	Captured during Vietnam War CCB.
	Point	Patrol boat		1	United States	Captured in 1975. Scrapped in Ho Chi Minh City, 1987.

=== Helicopter ===
Image	Model	Type	Variant	Quantity	Origin	Notes
7511 Kamov Ka-25 Hormone	Kamov Ka-25	ASW Helicopter		6	Soviet Union	Discontinued in the 1980s

=== Infantry weapon ===
==== Pistol ====
Image	Model	Type	Caliber	Variant	Origin	Notes
	Stechkin APS	Machine pistol	9×18mm Makarov		Soviet Union	Limited use.

==== Machine gun ====
Image	Model	Type	Caliber	Variant	Origin	Notes
	DShK	Heavy machine gun	12.7×108mm		Soviet Union; Vietnam	Mounted on T-55 tanks. Currently being phased out by the NSV.

==== Sniper rifle ====
Image	Model	Type	Caliber	Variant	Origin	Notes
	PSL	Designated marksman rifle	7.62×54mmR		Socialist Republic of Romania	May have been retired and replaced by IWI Galatz. Used by Naval Infantry.

=== Ground vehicle ===
==== Tank ====
Image	Model	Type	Variant	Quantity	Origin	Notes
	SU-100	100 mm tank destroyer			Soviet Union	Retired from services, at least 20 are stored at J258 Warehouse. Used by coastal defence forces of PNVN.

=== Coastal artillery ===
==== Recoilless rifle ====
Image	Model	Type	Caliber	Variant	Origin	Notes
	B-11	Anti-tank recoilless rifle	82 mm HEAT		Soviet Union	Stored in reserves.

== Development ==
=== Submarine ===
Image	Model	Type	Variant	Quantity	Origin	Notes
	TN-300	Coastal submarine			Vietnam	Design by Naval Technical Institute
		Unmanned Underwater Vehicle			Vietnam	Being tested. Currently serves as target practice, sonar decoy, sonar training, and potential underwater surveillance.

=== Surface vessel ===
Image	Model	Type	Variant	Quantity	Origin	Notes
		Multirole anti-submarine frigate			Vietnam	2000 tons domestic design. Construction started 2026.
	SN-1000	Anti-submarine corvette			Vietnam	The SN-1000 anti-submarine ship is entirely a product of the Vietnam Military Ship Design Institute, perfectly suited for Vietnam's sea and island conditions, as well as the Navy's combat requirements. Able to withstand Sea State 8 and Wind Force 10. Specs: Max weight (ton): 935; Max speed (knot): 28 (51 km/h); Operation range (nautical miles): 3,500

== Future equipment ==
=== Transport / logistics support ===
Image	Model	Type	Quantity	Origin	Notes
	FET 10-meter Submarine Rescue Vehicle	Deep-submergence rescue vehicle	1	United Kingdom	
	Perry® XLX-C Remotely Operated Vehicle	Remotely operated underwater vehicle	1	United Kingdom	

== See also ==
- Vietnam People's Navy
- List of equipment of the Vietnam People's Ground Forces
- List of equipment of the Vietnam People's Air Force
- People's Army of Vietnam Special Forces
- Naval Air Force, Vietnam People's Navy
- Vietnam Coast Guard
- Vietnam People's Public Security
- Vietnam Fisheries Surveillance

== Sources ==
- The International Institute for Strategic Studies (2025). The Military Balance 2025. London: Routledge. ISBN 978-1-041-04967-8.
- The International Institute for Strategic Studies (2026). The Military Balance 2026. London: Routledge. ISBN 978-1-003-77897-4.
- Saunders, Stephan, ed. (2015). Jane's Fighting Ships 2015-2016. Jane's Information Group. ISBN 978-0710631435.
