= BPS-500 missile boat =

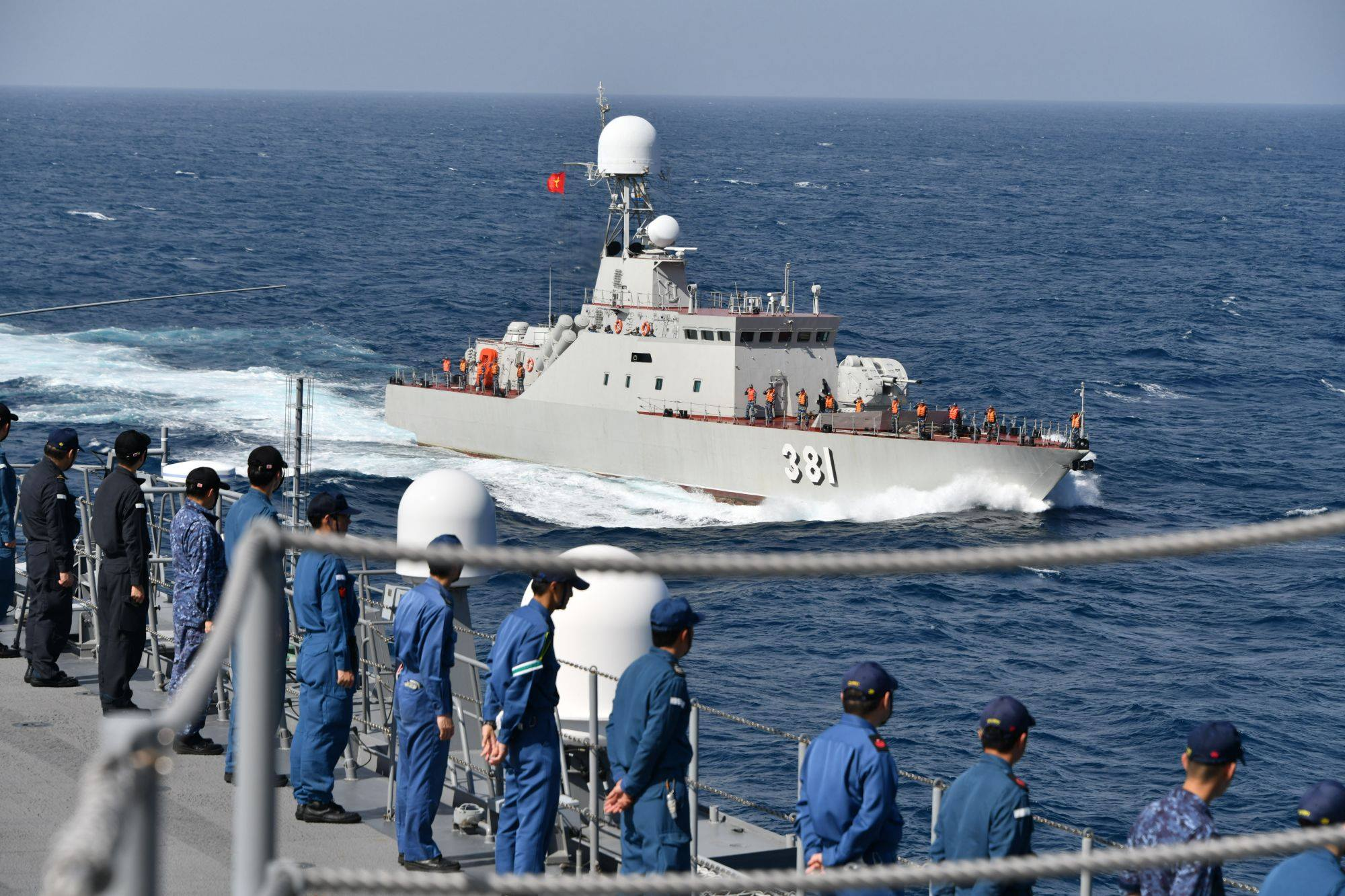
- HQ 381

Class overview
- Name: BPS-500 class
- Operators: Vietnam People's Navy
- Built: 1998–2001, 2025–present
- In commission: 2001–present
- Planned: 4
- On order: 3
- Building: 3
- Completed: 1
- Active: 1
- Laid up: 2
- Retired: 0

General characteristics
- Type: Guided-missile corvette
- Tonnage: 850 tons (full load)
- Length: 62 metres (203.4 ft)
- Beam: 11 metres (36.1 ft)
- Draught: 2.5 metres (8.2 ft)
- Propulsion: 2 × MTU diesel engine for 19,600 bhp (14,600 kW); 2 x Kamewa pump-jets
- Speed: 32 knots (59 km/h)
- Range: 2,200 nautical miles (4,100 km; 2,500 mi) at 14 knots (26 km/h)
- Complement: 28
- Sensors & processing systems: MR-352 ("Cross Dome") search radar; MR-123 ("Bass Tilt") fire control radar
- Armament: 1 x AK-176 76 mm gun; 1 x AK-630 30 mm CIWS; 2 x 12.7 mm machine guns; Anti-ship missiles; 8 x Kh-35 Uran anti-ship missiles (Ship 381); 8 x VCM-01 anti-ship missiles (from A2 onward); 1 x 9K38 Igla MANPADS

BPS-500 is a class of guided-missile corvette of the Vietnam People's Navy, built in Vietnam based on a Russian design. The first vessel, Ship 381, was laid down in 1998 with weapons and equipment imported from Russia and remained the sole ship of the class until 2025. In 2025, Vietnam commenced construction of the second vessel, designated A2, featuring entirely domestic electronics and weaponry systems.

== Development ==
Vietnam began a program to modernize its military equipment in the mid-1990s following further territorial disputes in the South China Sea with China. One aspect of the program was to develop domestic production and repair capability. Russia agreed to supply or co-produce small warships and missiles; In 1996, Russia and Vietnam agreed to co-produce the BPS-500; this may have been a part of or related to a cooperative military shipbuilding or program called KBO-2000.

BPS-500 was designed by the Severnoye Design Bureau. Two were ordered and Russia supplied two kits to the Ba Son Shipyard. HQ 381 was built with modular technology, launched in June 1998 and became operational in late-2001; it was the first missile boat produced in Vietnam. No more were produced as the ship did not meet requirements or more advanced ships became available. The pump-jets raised construction and maintnenace costs and had poor performance at low speed. The hull had insufficient seakeeping for long-range operations. There may also have been software and control system problems.

Severnoye was contracted to assist overhauling and upgrading the ship in 2013 and 2017.

== Description ==
BPS-500 is an improved Pauk-class corvette. Angled surfaces reduce radar cross section. The pump-jets with directional nozzles have better maneuverability in shallow waters and generate less noise than propellers.

== Sources ==
- The International Institute for Strategic Studies (2025). The Military Balance 2025. London: Routledge. ISBN 978-1-041-04967-8.
- Saunders, Stephan, ed. (2015). Jane's Fighting Ships 2015-2016. Jane's Information Group. ISBN 978-0710631435.
- Thayer, Carlyle A. (August 2016). "Vietnam's Strategy of 'Cooperating and Struggling' with China over Maritime Disputes in the South China Sea". Journal of Asian Security and International Affairs. 3 (2). SAGE Publications: 200–220.
- Thayer, Carlyle A. (2018). "Force Modernization: Vietnam". In Singh, Daljit; Cook, Malcolm (eds.). Southeast Asian Affairs. Singapore: ISEAS Publishing. pp. 429–444. ISBN 978-981-4786-84-3.
- Arthur, Gordon (2026-08-13). "Vietnam Begins Construction on First Indigenous Multipurpose Frigate". Naval News.
