= Forum Energy Technologies =

Oil and gas industry

Forum Energy Technologies, Inc. (FET)
- Formerly: Forum Oilfield Technologies, Inc.
- Company type: Public company
- Traded as: NYSE: FET; Russell 2000 Component
- Industry: Oil and Gas Equipment, Services
- Predecessors: Triton Group, Subsea Services International, Global Flow Technologies, and Allied Technology
- Founded: 2005; 21 years ago
- Headquarters: Houston, Texas, United States
- Area served: Worldwide
- Key people: Christopher Gaut (Chairman), Neal Lux (CEO)
- Products: Drilling & Subsea; Completions; Production & Infrastructure
- Number of employees: Approx. 1,500 (2016)
- Website: www.f-e-t.com

Forum Energy Technologies is an American oilfield products company that provides products and services to the oil and gas, and renewable industries worldwide.

The company's subsea division provides a range of subsea equipment and services, including ROVs, intervention tooling, subsea structures, pipeline connectors, and survey and positioning equipment. The division operates globally, with locations in the UK, Norway, Singapore, Brazil, and the US.

The company operates globally in multiple business segments related to the energy industry. Forum Energy Technologies is traded on the New York Stock Exchange (NYSE) under the ticker "FET".

== History ==
Forum Energy Technologies was founded in 2010 as a result of the merger of five oilfield products companies: Forum Oilfield Technologies, Triton Group, Subsea Services International, Global Flow Technologies, and Allied Technology.

Triton Group was a UK-based provider of subsea products and services, including remotely operated vehicles (ROVs), intervention tools, and subsea engineering services. Triton Group was formed in 2007 as a result of the merger of Perry Slingsby Systems, Sub-Atlantic, UK Project Support Ltd, and Dynamic Positioning Services Ltd.

Global Flow Technologies was a US-based company that provided flow management products and services, including choke and control valves, flowline products, and flow measurement products.

Allied Technology was a US-based company that provided drilling equipment, including drilling motors, rotary steerable systems, and drilling optimization software.

Forum Oilfield Technologies was originally founded in 2005 as an independent company focused on providing drilling products and services to the oil and gas industry. The company was based in Houston, Texas, and grew quickly through a combination of organic growth and strategic acquisitions.

In 2010, the company was renamed from Forum Oilfield Technologies to Forum Energy Technologies.
