= Vietnamese research ship Tran Dai Nghia =

Vietnam
- Name: Giáo sư-Viện sĩ Trần Đại Nghĩa
- Namesake: Tran Dai Nghia
- Operator: Vietnam People's Navy
- Builder: Song Thu Corporation
- Laid down: 2008
- Launched: 2010
- Commissioned: 2011
- In service: 2011-
- Identification: IMO number: 9559925; Pennant number: 888
- Status: in active service

General characteristics
- Class & type: Hydrographic Survey Vessel 6613
- Type: Multipurpose vessel for hydrographic and oceanographic survey, training, buoy laying, mine counter measure
- Displacement: 1500 t
- Length: 66.35 m
- Beam: 13.20 m
- Draught: 3.10 m (summer)
- Depth: 6.50 m
- Installed power: 2× 600 ekW diesel-electric engines
- Propulsion: 2× 1600 mm fixed-pitch azimuth propellers; 1× 140 ekW bow thruster
- Speed: 12.6 knots
- Boats & landing craft carried: 2× 8.0 m survey boats, 1× 4.0 m RIB
- Crew: 19 + 27 additional personnel
- Sensors & processing systems: 1× X-band radar; 1× S-band radar; Equipped with extensive hydrographic/oceanographic systems including multi-beam and single-beam echo sounders, towed side scan sonar, ultra short baseline, shallow and deep water CTD systems; classified by Lloyd’s Register
- Electronic warfare & decoys: GMDSS Area A3

Vietnam People's Navy Ship 888–Professor-Academian Trần Đại Nghĩa (Vietnamese: Giáo sư-Viện sĩ Trần Đại Nghĩa) is a HSV-6613-type ocean surveillance ship designed by the Netherlands-based Damen Group and constructed at the Song Thu Corporation (Vietnam), contributing to overcoming the lack of equipment for research, survey, surveying the sea, all set chart warning waters of Vietnam, creating favorable conditions for exploration, exploitation, management and protection of marine resources.

HSV 6613 Ocean surveillance ship was started building in July, 2008 and launched in October, 2010 by the Song Thu Corporation, following the design of the Dutch Damen Group, meeting all demands set by the Vietnam Register and Lloyd's Register Group as well as the latest international maritime conventions. Until this time using the training ship and sea-level testing that is done military service.

Before inauguration and operation, Tran Dai Nghia has undergone all four phases meet test requirements in design, schedule and quality. This type of steel hull ships, unrestricted activity level, consistent with hydrographic features survey and marine survey measurements meet standards and regulations for decentralization of shipbuilding steel shell of TCVN 6259/2003 Vietnam Register, Lloyd's Register, as well as conventions and other regulations related to the survey ship, surveying the sea,... The vessel line shape and drive systems for adaptive purposes, can be easily rotated even in narrow waters, storm strength on level 12. With four diesel engines and 5,000 nautical miles operating range, Tran Dai Nghia can operate continuously over 60 days and nights.

HSV- 6613 Ocean surveillance ship was delivered to Vietnam People's Navy to use for research, survey, mapping panoramic sea areas of Vietnam to contribute to creating favorable conditions for the exploration operation, management and protection of Vietnam's marine resources. In addition, the ship also contributes to the development of marine economy, maintaining maritime security and defense, as required to meet the marine strategy to 2020.

The ship was named after Professor, Major General Trần Đại Nghĩa (1913 - 1997), Hero of Vietnam's military technology.
