= Naval Commando, Vietnam People's Navy =

Elite special forces of the Vietnam People's Navy trained to attack enemy water targets

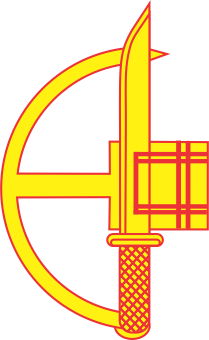
Coat of arms of the Naval Special Force, Vietnam People's Navy.

The Naval Commando (Đặc công Hải quân) or alternatively the Naval Special Operations Force is the elite, special force, and component of the Vietnam People's Navy that is purposed to attack enemy water targets such as harbors, ships, etc. and targets that can only be accessed via water: Isolated bases, naval bases, etc. Virtually a combat arms of the Vietnamese Navy, the component exists as a single brigade under the Naval Service Headquarters.

== History ==
During the First Indochina War, the river operations of the French army accounted for an important part of the battlefield. Taking advantage of Vietnam's territory with a long coastline, many rivers, and interlaced rivers like the Southwest region, the French deployed ships for combat operations. The French Navy focuses on three main activities:

- Use ships to provided support to troops.
- Raiding base, preventing the Viet Minh's supplies and transportation.
- Using waterways to provide supplies to French forces on land.

To counter the activities of the French Navy, the Viet Minh created French ship hunting squads, including naval special forces, in the riparian and coastal areas.

During the Battle of the Day River (June 1951), a squads led by Nguyễn Quang Vinh (of 36th Regiment, 308th Battalion) used bamboo boats with 300 kg of explosives to sink LCD ships carrying weapons of French army. This is the opening battle of naval warfare in the Northern battlefield, creating a premise for the use of special forces to hit targets across rivers and seas. In the South, in early 1949, the Long Châu Sa ship hunting team used homemade mines to sink the Glycin ship on the Sài Thượng River, killing hundreds of enemy troops.

In the Rừng Sác area, in September 1950, special teams were formed from the 300th Regiment, operating in the areas of Nhà Bè, Thủ Thiêm down to Cần Giờ, Soài Rạp. This force fought very bravely, daringly, known as "suicide troops", killing many French commanders and soldiers. Thus, in the early stages of the war, along with the fighting style of the special forces, the fighting style of the Naval Special Force also began to develop. Based on the progress of weapons research and improvement, locals in the North and the South have organized a specialized force to hit ships and boats by special operations.

== Organisation ==
The modern Naval Commando consits of 1 unit, which is the 126th Naval Special Forces Brigade consists of 1st, 2nd, 3rd, 4th battalion; Counter-Terrorist company; Frogman company and a boat squadron.

== Current equipment ==
Infantry weapons:

| Names | Images | Types | Origins | Notes |
|---|---|---|---|---|
| TT-33 | | Semi-automatic pistol | Soviet Union | |
| Makarov | | Semi-automatic pistol | Soviet Union | |
| CZ 82 | | Semi-automatic pistol | Czechoslovak Socialist Republic | |
| Uzi Pro | | Submachine gun | Israel | |
| AKM | | Assault rifle | Soviet Union | |
| AKMS | | Assault rifle | Soviet Union | |
| IWI Tavor | | Assault rifle | Israel | |
| M-18 | | Assault rifle/Carbine | Vietnam | Vietnam improved from the CAR-15 XM177E2 gun line of spoils obtained after the Vietnam War. |
| RPK | | Light machine gun/Squad automatic weapon | Soviet Union | |
| RPK-74 | | | Soviet Union | |
| IWI Negev | | Light machine gun/Squad automatic weapon | Israel | |
| Dragunov SVD | | | Soviet Union | |
| IMI Galatz | | Sniper rifles | Israel | |
| RPG-7V | | Rocket-propelled grenade | Soviet Union | |
| M-79 | | Grenade launcher | United StatesVietnam | |
| Milkor MGL | | | South AfricaVietnam | |

Supported military motor vehicles:

| Names | Images | Types | Origins | Notes |
|---|---|---|---|---|
| Canoe CQ | | Canoe | Vietnam | |
| Mil Mi-171/Mi-17Sh | | Transport helicopter, rescued | Soviet Union | |

== See also ==
- Naval Special Operations Command
- Naval Special Warfare Command (Thailand)
- Special Boarding Unit
- PASKAL
- Naval Diving Unit (Singapore)
- KOPASKA
- Special Boat Squadron (Sri Lanka)
- Myanmar Navy#Navy SEALs
- Special Warfare Diving and Salvage
- Republic of Korea Navy Special Warfare Flotilla
- List of military special forces units
