= USS Maricopa County =

Tank landing ship of the US Navy

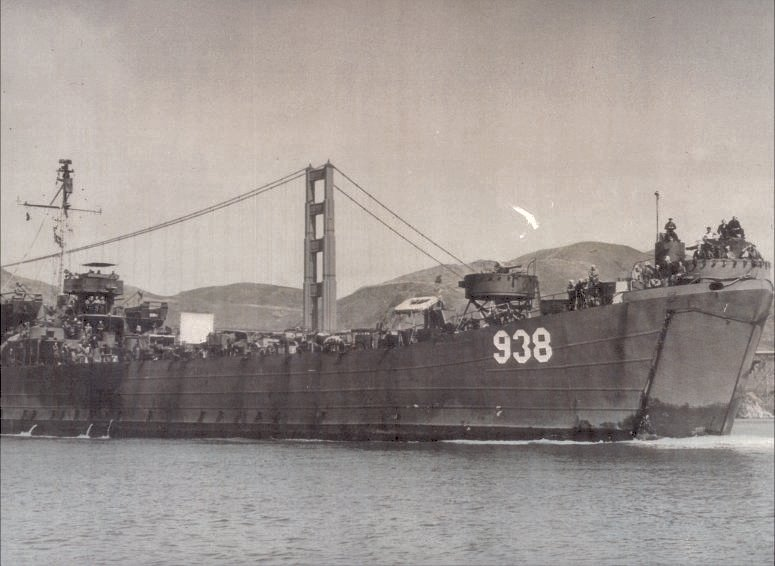
- USS LST-938 entering San Francisco Bay, having just passed under the Golden Gate Bridge, as she returns from duty in the South Pacific, 27 May 1946

History

United States
- Name: LST-938
- Builder: Bethlehem-Hingham Shipyard, Hingham, Massachusetts
- Yard number: 3408
- Laid down: 14 July 1944
- Launched: 15 August 1944
- Commissioned: 9 September 1944
- Decommissioned: December 1949
- Identification: Hull symbol: LST-935; Code letters: NKCS
- Honors and awards: 2 × battle star

United States
- Name: LST-938 (1951–1955); Maricopa County (1955–1956)
- Namesake: Maricopa County, Arizona
- Commissioned: 14 December 1951
- Decommissioned: 29 February 1956
- Renamed: Maricopa County, 1 July 1955
- Stricken: 1 June 1962
- Fate: Transferred to South Vietnam, 12 July 1962

South Vietnam
- Name: Da Nang
- Namesake: City of Da Nang
- Acquired: 12 July 1962
- Identification: Hull symbol: HQ-501
- Captured: Democratic Republic of Vietnam, 29 April 1975

Vietnam
- Name: Trần Khánh Dư
- Namesake: Prince Trần Khánh Dư
- Acquired: 29 April 1975
- Identification: Hull symbol: HQ-501
- Status: Active in service as of 2026

General characteristics
- Class & type: LST-542-class tank landing ship
- Displacement: 1,625 long tons (1,651 t) (light); 4,080 long tons (4,145 t) (full (seagoing draft with 1,675 short tons (1,520 t) load); 2,366 long tons (2,404 t) (beaching)
- Length: 328 ft (100 m) oa
- Beam: 50 ft (15 m)
- Draft: Unloaded: 2 ft 4 in (0.71 m) forward; 7 ft 6 in (2.29 m) aft; Full load: 8 ft 3 in (2.51 m) forward; 14 ft 1 in (4.29 m) aft; Landing with 500 short tons (450 t) load: 3 ft 11 in (1.19 m) forward; 9 ft 10 in (3.00 m) aft; Limiting 11 ft 2 in (3.40 m); Maximum navigation 14 ft 1 in (4.29 m)
- Installed power: 2 × 900 hp (670 kW) Electro-Motive Diesel 12-567A diesel engines; 1,800 shp (1,300 kW)
- Propulsion: 1 × Falk main reduction gears; 2 × Propellers
- Speed: 11.6 kn (21.5 km/h; 13.3 mph)
- Range: 24,000 nmi (44,000 km; 28,000 mi) at 9 kn (17 km/h; 10 mph) while displacing 3,960 long tons (4,024 t)
- Boats & landing craft carried: 2 x LCVPs
- Capacity: 1,600–1,900 short tons (3,200,000–3,800,000 lb; 1,500,000–1,700,000 kg) cargo depending on mission
- Troops: 16 officers, 147 enlisted men
- Complement: 13 officers, 104 enlisted men
- Armament: Varied, ultimate armament; 2 × twin 40 mm (1.57 in) Bofors guns; 4 × single 40 mm Bofors guns; 12 × 20 mm (0.79 in) Oerlikon cannons

Service record
- Operations: Mindanao Island landings (10–18 March, 24 March–14 April 1945); Balikpapan operation (26 June–9 July 1945); Vietnam War; Cambodian–Vietnamese War
- Awards: China Service Medal; American Campaign Medal; Asiatic–Pacific Campaign Medal; World War II Victory Medal; Navy Occupation Service Medal w/Asia Clasp; National Defense Service Medal; Philippine Republic Presidential Unit Citation; Philippine Liberation Medal

USS Maricopa County (LST-938) was an LST-542-class tank landing ship built for the United States Navy during World War II. Like many of her class, she was not named and is properly referred to by her hull designation. She was later named after Maricopa County, Arizona, she was the only US Naval vessel to bear the name.

== Construction ==
LST-938 was laid down on 14 July 1944, at Hingham, Massachusetts, by the Bethlehem-Hingham Shipyard; launched on 15 August 1944; and commissioned on 9 September 1944.

== Service history ==
=== World War II ===
After completing her shakedown in Chesapeake Bay, she was assigned to the 7th Fleet. With LCT-1210 aboard, she departed New York on 18 October 1944, and rendezvoused with a convoy near Guantánamo en route the South Pacific. Pausing briefly in the New Hebrides, LST-938 sailed on to Seeadler Harbor, Admiralty Islands, and commenced unloading on 16 December.

Having taken on supplies for a PT base on 7 January 1945, she joined a convoy for the partially liberated Philippines, where she operated for next four months.

On 10 March, elements of the 41st Infantry Division were put ashore at Zamboanga on the southwest tip of Mindanao. Further south an invasion was pending and on 28 April, LST-938 departed Leyte and steamed to Cairns, Australia. Illustrating the cooperative nature of the war effort, LST-938 transported elements of the Australian 7th Infantry Division to the assault beaches at Balikpapan, Borneo, Dutch East Indies. Unscathed after the landing operations of 1 July, and the follow-up resupply missions, she returned to the Philippines on 27 July.

=== Post-war activities ===
As the war ended, the ship embarked occupation troops and discharged them at Tokyo on 15 September. LST-938 continued to serve in the Japanese occupation until 30 November. Her next assignment placed her on duty along the China coast until 13 May 1946. The ship then departed Qingdao and returned to the United States.

From her arrival on the east coast on 12 July 1946, until December 1949, LST-938 served as Naval Reserve training ship first at Bayonne, New Jersey, and later at Gulfport, Mississippi. She was deactivated at Green Cove Springs, Florida, where she was decommissioned and assigned to the Atlantic Reserve Fleet.

=== Korean War era ===
War in Korea saw her reactivated, and she was recommissioned 14 December 1951. LST-938 was based at the Little Creek Naval Amphibious Base, Virginia, and served as a Marine Corps training ship. During the next 4½ years she carried out operations from Greenland to the Caribbean area.

On 1 July 1955 she was named Maricopa County.

=== Decommissioning and transfer ===
Following an inactivation overhaul at New York she reached Green Cove Springs on 2 December 1955, and decommissioned on 29 February 1956. Late in October 1961 Maricopa County was towed to Philadelphia Navy Yard and prepared for a new career.

== Republic of Vietnam service ==
Struck from the Navy List on 1 June 1962, she was transferred to the Republic of Vietnam and commissioned in the Republic of Vietnam Navy as RVNS Da Nang (HQ-501) on 12 July 1962.

== Capture by the Democratic Republic of Vietnam ==
Captured by the North Vietnamese around the time of the fall of Saigon, on 29 April 1975, the ship was placed in service with the Vietnam People's Navy and renamed Tran Khanh Du (HQ-501). Vietnam used her to land troops in Cambodia in its war against the Khmer Rouge.

As of 2017, the Trần Khánh Dư remains in active service with the Vietnam People's Navy.

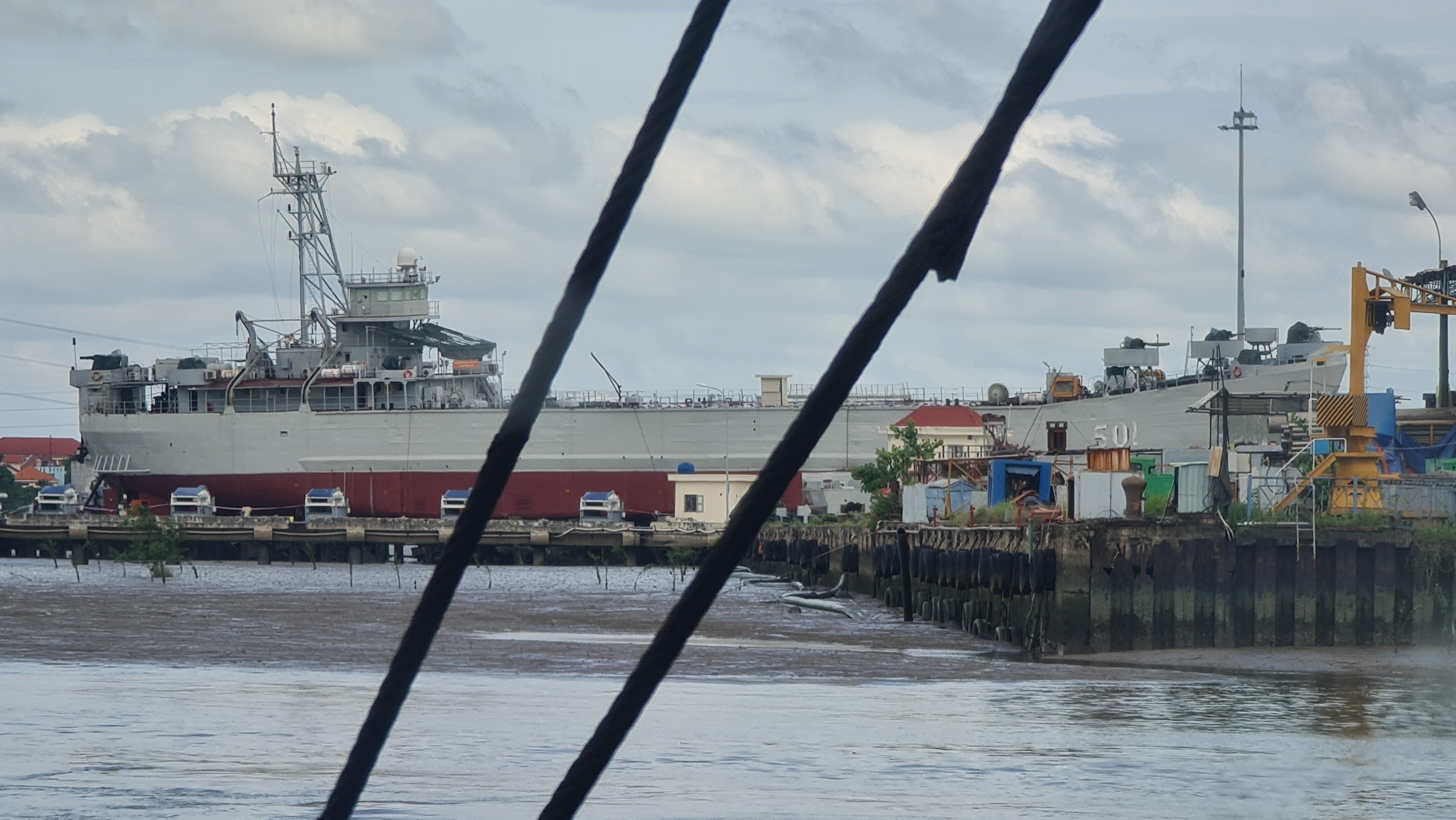
Trần Khánh Dư laid up, August 2023

== Awards ==
LST-938 earned two battle stars for World War II service.

== Bibliography ==
Online resources

- "LST-938". Dictionary of American Naval Fighting Ships. Naval History and Heritage Command. This article incorporates text from this source, which is in the public domain.
- "Maricopa County". Dictionary of American Naval Fighting Ships. Naval History and Heritage Command. 5 August 2015. This article incorporates text from this source, which is in the public domain.
- "Bethlehem-Hingham, Hingham MA". ShipbuildingHistory.com. 11 August 2011.
- "USS LST-938". NavSource. 6 November 2015.
