= VCS-01 Trường Sơn =

Vietnamese mobile coastal defence missile system

VCS-01
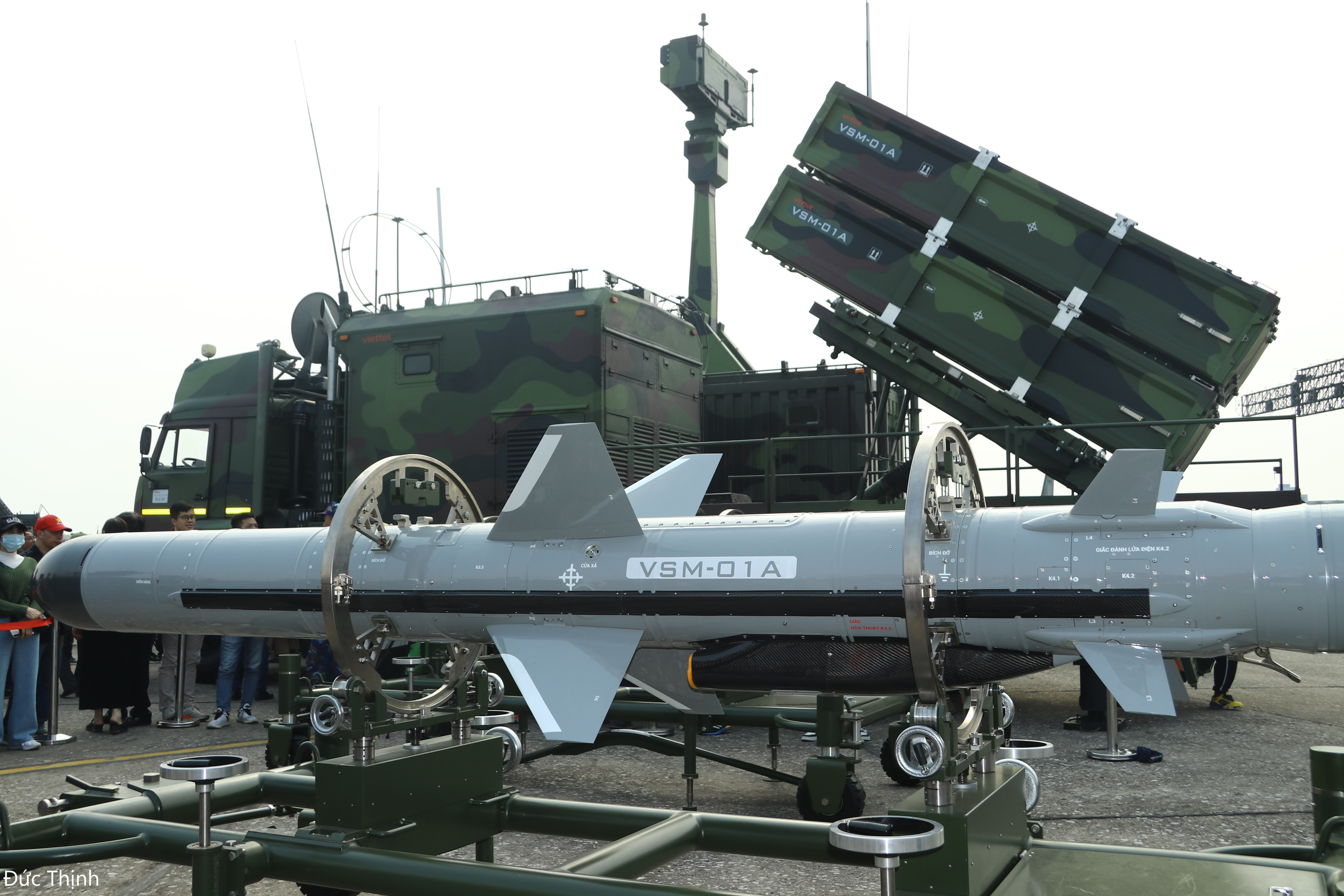
- A VSM-01A missile is being displayed next to a TEL of VCS-01 Trường Sơn and its VRS-MCX target designation radar.
- Type: Mobile coastal defense and anti-ship system
- Place of origin: Vietnam

Service history
- In service: 2024–present
- Used by: Vietnam

Production history
- Manufacturer: (Vietnam) Viettel Group: Viettel Aerospace Institute; Viettel Manufacturing Corp.; (Vietnam) Z189 Company (Vietnam) Z751 Factory
- Produced: 2018–now

The VCS-01, marketed as the Trường Sơn (Annamite Range) and also known as VCM-B, is a Vietnamese mobile, missile-based coastal defense system, developed by Viettel Group using its VCM-01 series of indigenous anti-ship missiles. The system integrates multiple components, including self-propelled launcher vehicles, target acquisition radars, command and control vehicles, transport and loading units, and technical inspection vehicles. It is designed to enhance Vietnam’s coastal defense capabilities, particularly in the South China Sea. It is primarily operated by the coastal missile and artillery forces of the Vietnam People's Navy.

== Development ==
The VCS-01 system was developed by a collaboration between Viettel (and various subsidiaries), the Z189 Shipyard with the support of research institutes under the Naval branch and the Ministry of Defense. Prototypes were tested in 2018 in the Quỳnh Lưu and Tiền Hải districts. Testing also included trials on a modified Shershen-class torpedo boat, demonstrating the missile's versatility.

== Operational history ==
The VCS-01 was initially revealed via images of a military convoy preparing for the 2024 Military-Political Conference, and was officially introduced at the Vietnam Defence Expo 2024.

In 2024, it was reported that VCM-B coastal defence missile systems consists of the VCM-01 missiles were delivered to the Brigade 679 of the 1st Regional Command under the Vietnam People's Navy since April of the respective year, confirming that VCM-01 has entered active services.

At the end of February 2025, a military convoy—believed to be carrying the VCS-01 system—appeared on social media en route to Brigade 680 of the 3rd Regional Command. Subsequent images confirmed this report, and it appears that the unit has also deployed the VCM01 missile (with a 300 km range) into active service alongside the system.

The VCS-01 system aligns with Vietnam’s anti-access/area denial (A2/AD) strategy, aimed at securing maritime interests in the South China Sea. This strategy includes the use of Kilo-class submarines, Su-30MK2 aircraft, and the domestically produced VCM-01 missile system. At its debut during a defense expo, the VCS-01 system showcased compatibility with various platforms, including missile boats, frigates, and potentially aircraft.

== Design and components ==
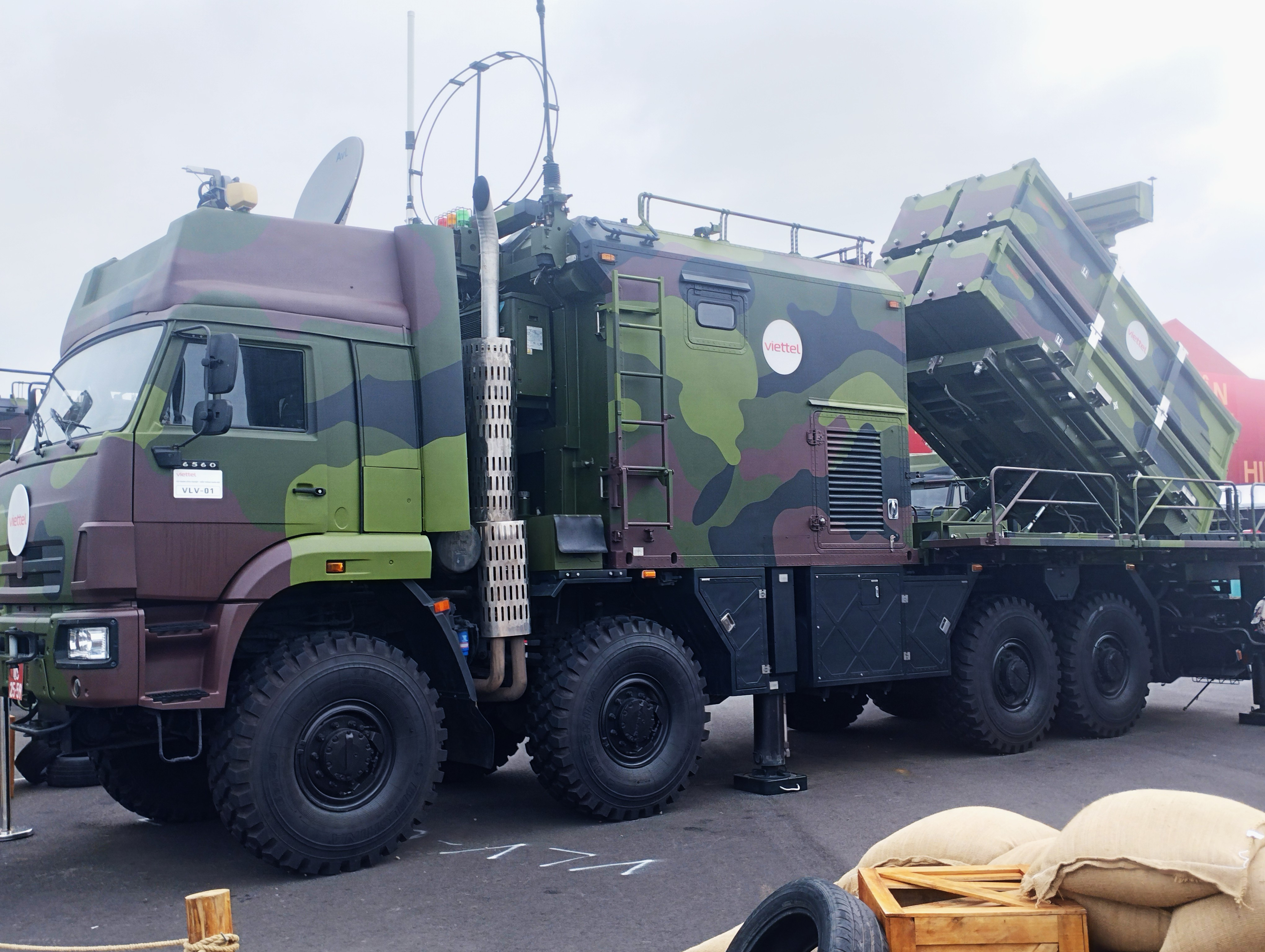
VLV-01 Launch Vehicle

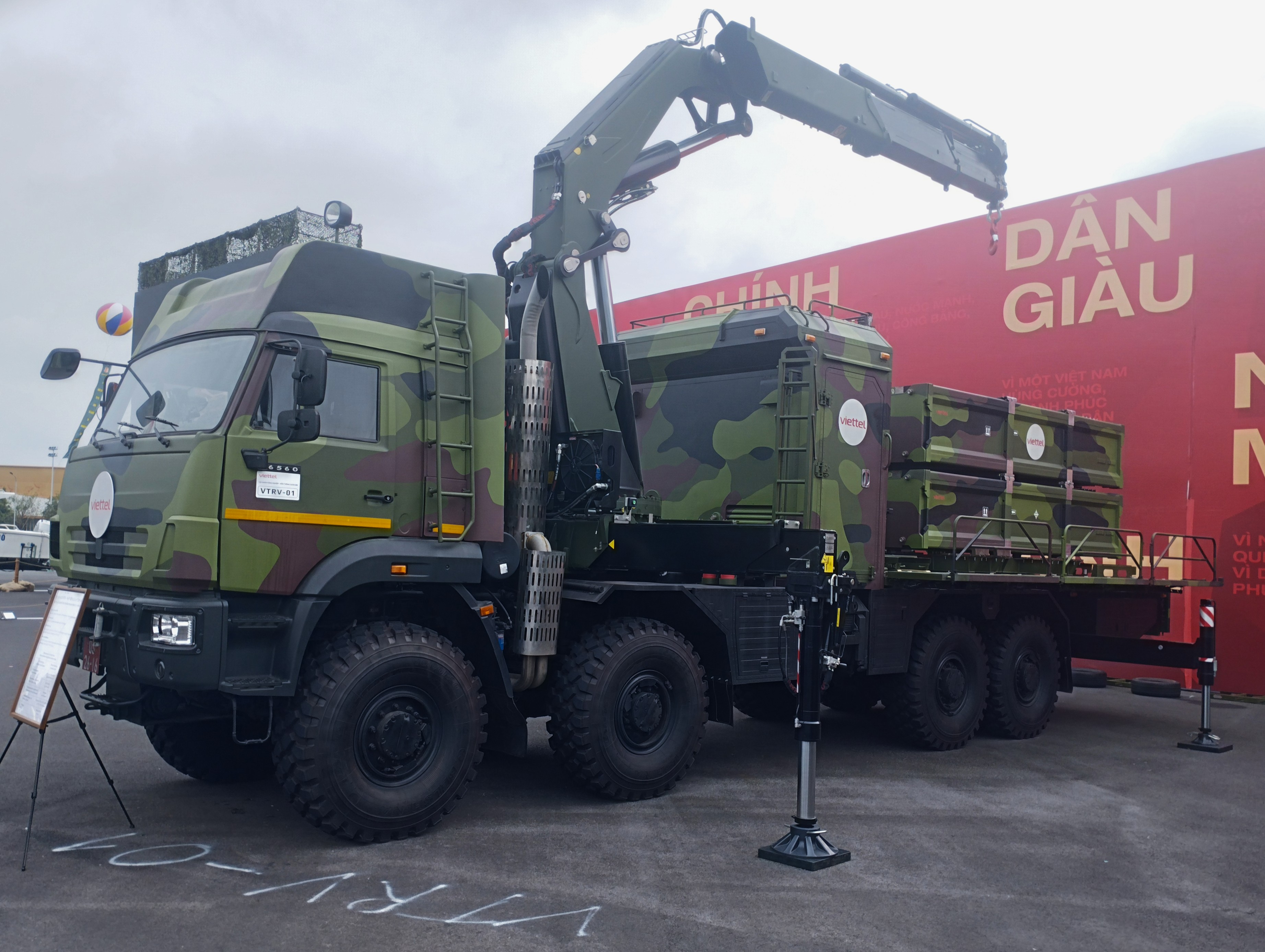
VTRV-01 Transporter and Reloader Vehicle

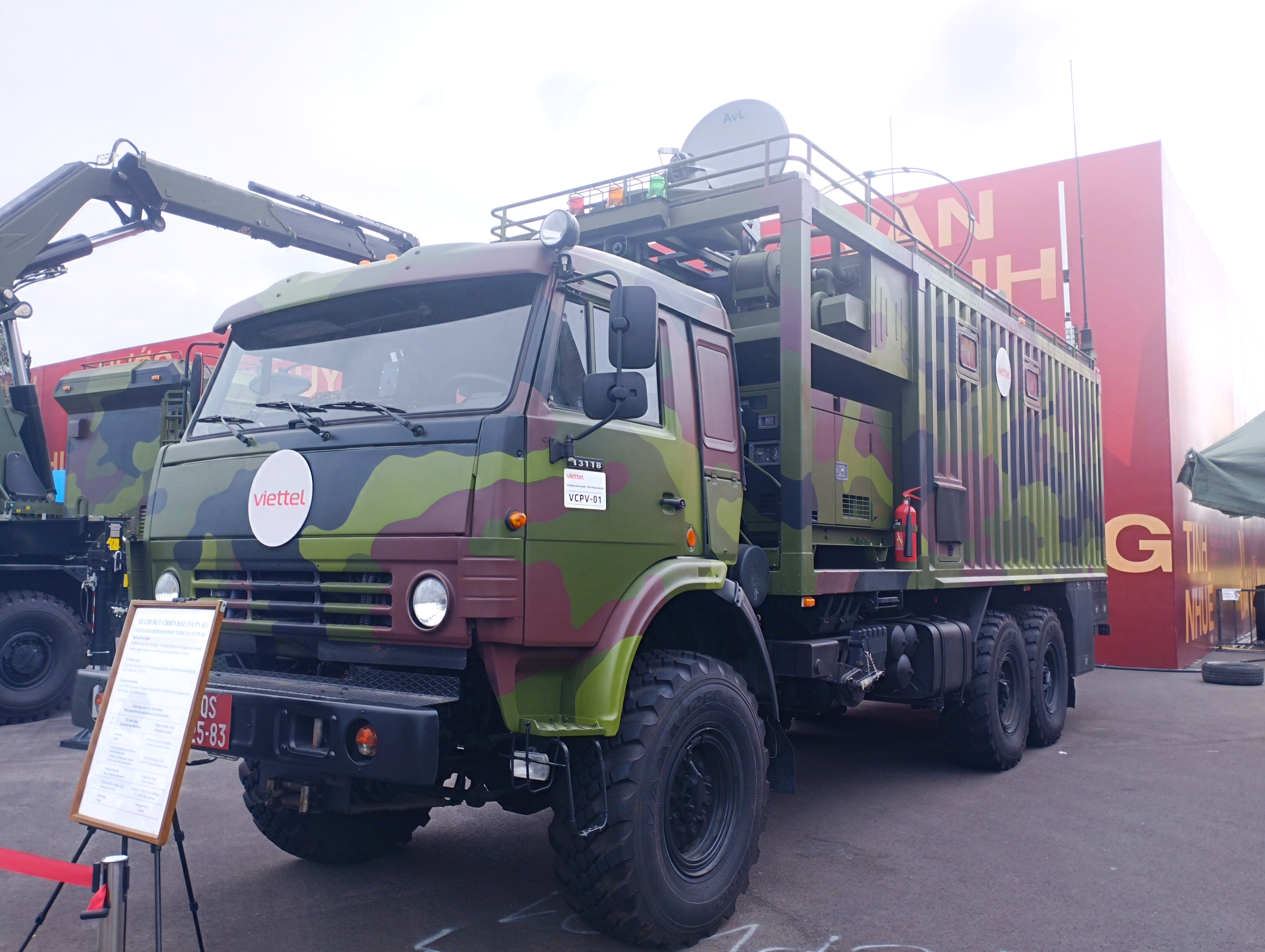
VCPV-01 Command and Processing Vehicle

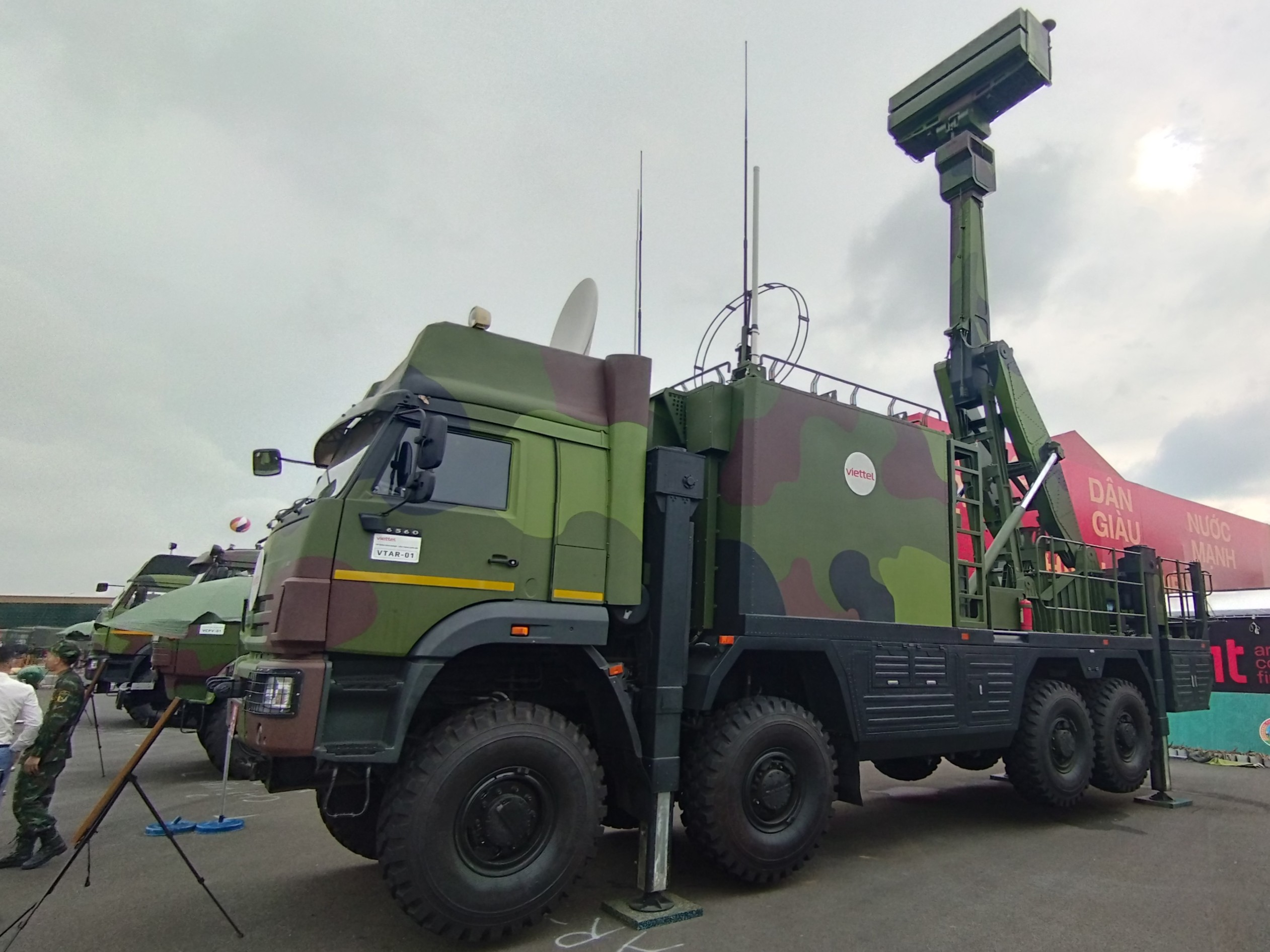
VTAR-1 (VRS-MCX/M25X) Target Acquisition Radar Vehicle

The VCS-01 system includes multiple components mounted on truck chassis to ensure high mobility and operational flexibility. At the heart of the system is the VLV-01 Launcher Vehicle, which is based on the KamAZ-6560 8×8 chassis, which is the same as many other heavy equipment in People's Army of Vietnam . Each launcher vehicle can carry up to four missiles. The launch platform can be fitted with many other variants of VCM-01, just by changing the missile canister without further modification. The platform is made by Z751 Factory of Vietnam Peoples's Army. The VLV-01 can be operational within ten minutes of arrival at a deployment site, offering rapid response capability.Equipped with an NVIS antenna for extended‐range communication.

The VTRV-01 Transporter and Reloader Vehicle is another essential component, also built on the KAMAZ-6560 chassis. It is responsible for transporting spare missiles and reloading the launcher vehicle using a hydraulic crane. The VTRV-01 can carry up to four missile canisters and reload a full pod of four missiles in under 40 minutes, ensuring efficient resupply during operations.

The VTIV-01 Technical Inspection Vehicle is used to assess the readiness and technical status of the missiles. Mounted on the KamAZ-5350 6×6 chassis, it is capable of conducting inspections both when the missiles are inside their canisters and when removed. This feature ensures that the missiles are maintained at peak operational readiness.

Target acquisition and tracking are performed by the VTAR-1 Target Acquisition Radar Vehicle, mounted on a KAMAZ-6560 chassis. Weighing nearly 40 tonnes, this system delivers real-time information on surface targets—including azimuth, range, speed, and heading. A medium-range radar mounted on a hydraulic mast allows the VTAR-1 to detect and track maritime targets, while its built-in electronic counter-countermeasure capabilities ensure reliable operation in contested environments. From arrival, the radar can be deployed and fully operational within 25 minutes. .The VTAR-1 itself is a variant of the VRS-MCX system, which was also produced by Viettel, incorporating the same advanced radar technology optimized for maritime target tracking.

Finally, the VCPV-01 Command and Processing Vehicle provides centralized command and control for the system. Built on the KAMAZ-5350 6×6 chassis, it houses advanced C4ISR equipment for seamless communication and coordination between all components. The VCPV-01 ensures that the entire VCS-01 system can function efficiently, whether in centralized or standalone combat scenarios .By design, a complete battery includes four launch vehicles and four reload vehicles, allowing the entire system to carry 32 rounds.

== Missile ==
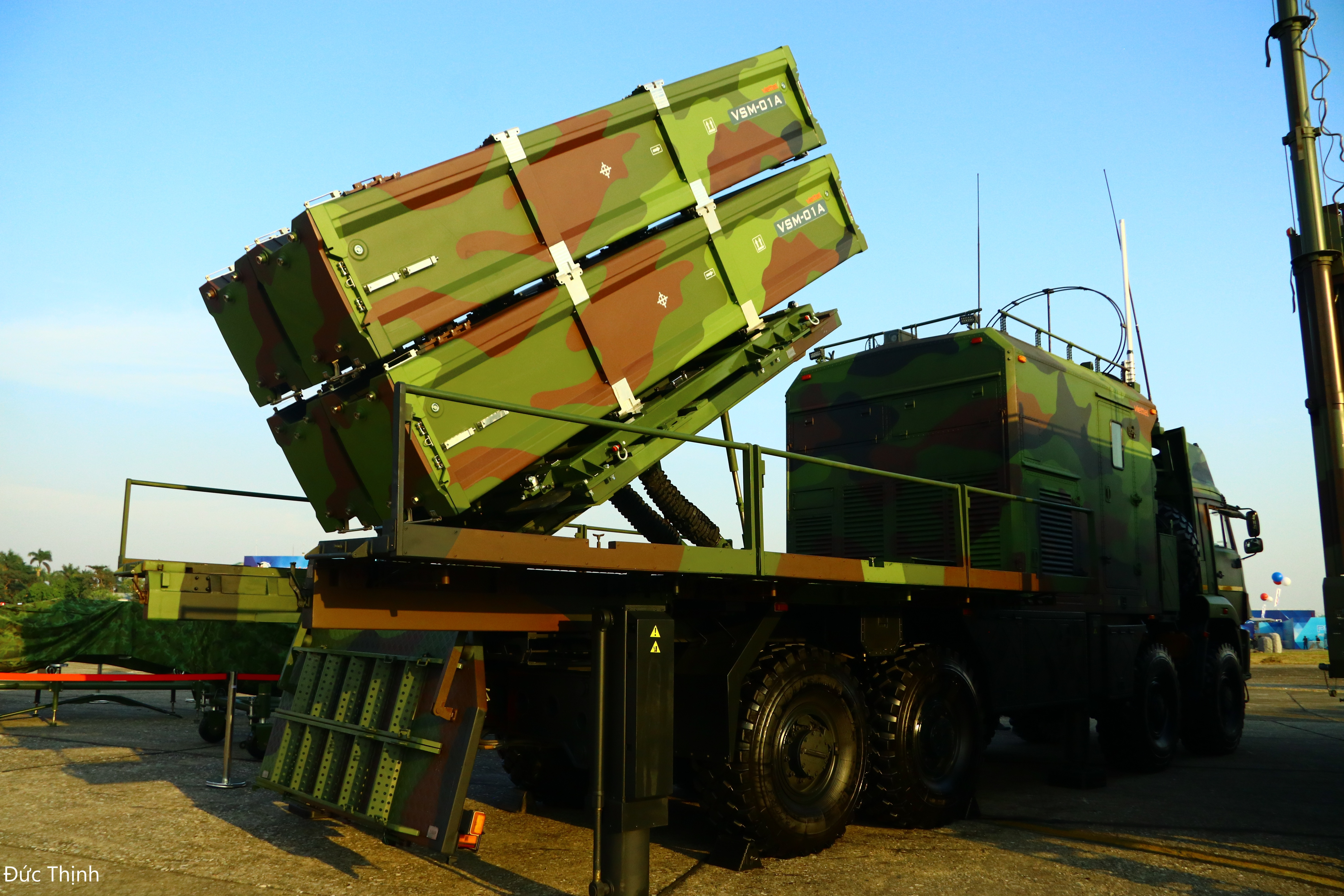
TEL with VSM-01A's canisters at the 2024 Vietnam Defence Expo.

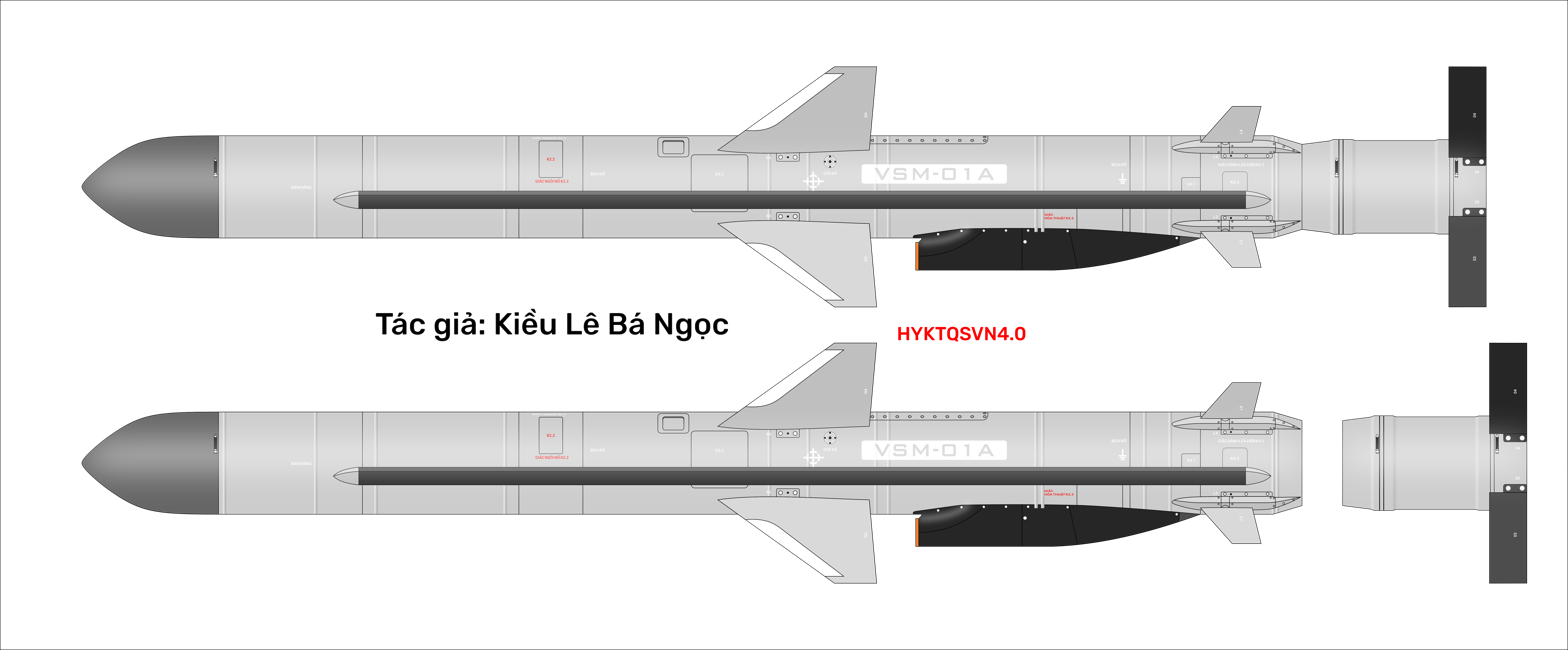
VSM-01A "Sông Hồng" Anti-ship Missile

The primary missile used by the VCS-01 is the VSM-01A, also known as "Song Hong," which replaces the P-15 Termit missile. This missile is part of the VCM-01 missile family, modeled on the Russian Kh-35E but with several modifications. These include a lighter airframe, redesigned air intake, and updated avionics. The VSM-01A missile has a range of 80 kilometers, doubling that of the P-15 Termit. It operates at subsonic speeds and features advanced guidance systems for improved targeting precision.

Several leaked images from military convoys have revealed the existence of at least three other types of missiles with larger dimensions, based on the size of the canisters mounted on launch vehicles, and with potentially longer ranges of approximately 130 km, 300 km and 600 km.

== Variants ==
- VCS-01A - Standard coastal defense variant.
- VCM-02 - 300km range variant.
- VCM-06 - 600km range variant.
- IIR VCM- Imaging Infrared (IIR) seeker variant.

== Operators ==
Vietnam - Vietnam People's Army

- Naval Service
  - Brigade 679 (1st Regional Command)
  - Brigade 680 (3rd Regional Command )

== See also ==
- Kh-35
- Bal-E
- P-15 Termit
