= VCM-01 =

Vietnamese subsonic cruise missiles family

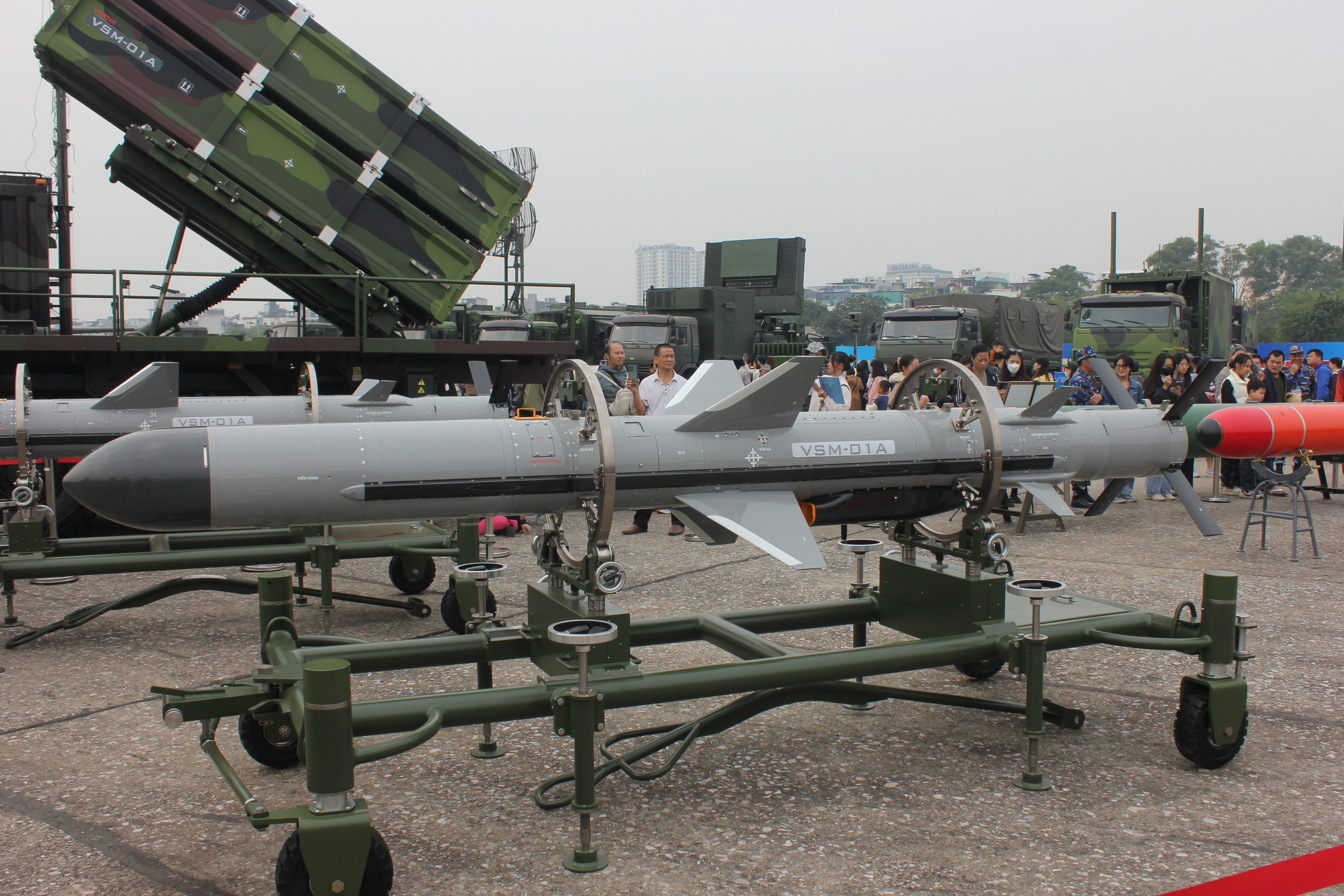
- A VSM-01A missile being displayed next to its TEL of the VCS-01 Trường Sơn missile system.
- Type: Cruise missile Anti-ship missile Surface-to-surface missile Land-attack missile
- Place of origin: Vietnam

Service history
- In service: Since 2024
- Used by: Vietnam People's Army: Vietnam People's Navy

Production history
- Designer: (Vietnam) Viettel Aerospace Institute
- Manufacturer: (Vietnam) Viettel Group: Viettel Aerospace Institute; Viettel Manufacturing Corp.; (Vietnam) Z189 Company

Specifications
- Guidance system: Active radar homing; Inertial guidance + satellite navigation
- Launch platform: VCS-01 Trường Sơn; Coastal defence missile system; Missile boats, corvettes and frigates; Military aircraft; (expected and not confirmed)

VCM-01 (Vietnam/Viettel Cruise Missile-01) is a family of Vietnamese subsonic anti-surface cruise missiles developed by the Viettel Aerospace Institute (VTX).

== Development and operational history ==
=== First appearance ===
In 2019, the first picture of a missile designated as VCM-01 missile was made public. The model was unveiled on a television show showing that the new missile was externally identical to the Kh-35, and information printed on the model's body showed that Z189 Shipyard was also engaged in the development of the missile. Z189 has been the local manufacturer for the KT-184 launcher for the Vietnam People's Navy Kh-35E missiles, so it is likely that Z189 will also produce the launchers and the outer shell of the VCM-01 missiles.

In late 2021, the VCM-01 missile appeared once more time in another television show, indirectly confirmed that the missile will be assembled by the M3 Communication Company (now merged into the Viettel Manufacturing Corporation), which is a unit of the Viettel Group.

The VCS-01 Trường Sơn was initially revealed via images of a military convoy preparing for the 2024 Military-Political Conference, and was officially introduced at the Vietnam Defence Expo 2024.

=== Test fires ===
According to the Vietnamese authorities' documents ordering prohibitions on some specific coastal areas in 2018, VCM-01 is test-fired for at least twice. Once was in Quỳnh Lưu District, Nghệ An Province and another once was in Tiền Hải District, Thái Bình Province. No further information was announced or reported by the local authorities as well as Viettel, including the results of those activities and the existence of any other test fires besides those mentioned.

In late 2023, it was reported that the VCM-01 missiles were mounted on a former Vietnam People's Navy and Vietnam Coast Guard Shershen-class torpedo boat for sea trials.

=== Introduction into service ===
In 2024, it was reported that VCM-B coastal defence missile systems consists of the VCM-01 missiles were delivered to the Brigade 679 of the 1st Regional Command under the Vietnam People's Navy since April of the respective year, confirming that VCM-01 has entered active services.

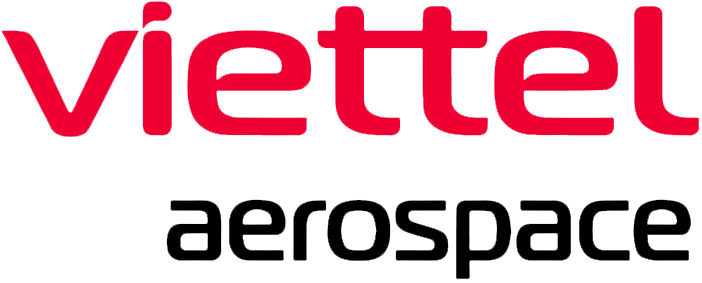

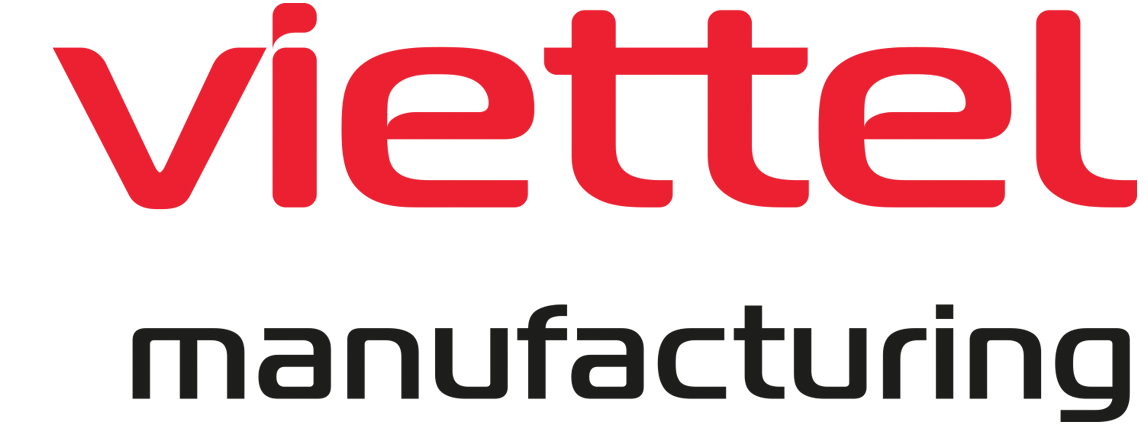
The development of the VCM-01 missile is mainly held by Viettel Aerospace Institute and the production is held by the Viettel Manufacturing Corporation - both are subsidiaries of the Viettel Group.

At the end of February 2025, a military convoy—believed to be carrying the VCS-01 system—appeared on social media en route to Brigade 680 of the 3rd Regional Command. Subsequent images confirmed this report, and it appears that the unit has also deployed the VCM01 missile (with a 300 km range) into active service alongside the system.

== Engine ==
In 2020, Vietnam and South Korea entered negotiations for the delivery of the South Korean SSE-750K turbojet engines to Vietnam, presumably for the VCM-01 project. This is the engine used in South Korea's SSM-710K Haeseong anti-ship missile, as well as its tactical land-attack variant SSM-750K Sea Dragon. Vietnam may have only chose this engine for the prototype but stopped using it when going to production, as Viettel was able to develop a domestic engine for it.

In 2024, the production of the VJE-01 turbojet engine was domestically carried out by Viettel Aerospace and was not the result of a licensed production or technology transfer (TOT). Following the VJE-01, the VTJ-320 is a small turbojet engine developed by Viettel Aerospace Institute as part of its mainline propulsion lineup for medium-range cruise missiles. Showcased by Viettel Aerospace, the engine is designed to provide balanced performance for tactical applications, though detailed technical specifications remain classified and have not been publicly disclosed. With its moderate thrust output and compact design, the VTJ-320 is speculated to serve as the primary powerplant for the VCM-01 series of subsonic anti-ship cruise missiles, offering a more suitable match for the missile's medium-range profile compared to higher-thrust alternatives like the VJE-01, which exceeds the requirements for this platform. This engine underscores Viettel's ongoing efforts to indigenize key defense technologies for Vietnam's naval and coastal defense systems.

== Confusion with the "KCT-15" project ==
Many Vietnamese and international sources (including SIPRI) believe that "KCT-15" was a Vietnamese project to assemble the Kh-35E/UE anti-ship missile as an effort to improve self-reliance on the supply and technological mastery of armaments for the Vietnam People's Navy as well as the entire People's Army of Vietnam. Another media source believes that KCT-15 was the old designation of the VCM-01 development project before it was taken over and redesignated as VCM-01 by VTX. However, "KCT-15" was never a designation for any missile development project undertaken by Vietnam or Viettel, and in fact, the prefix "KCT" is used to designate a set of projects in a program to study and master the operation and maintenance of the Kh-35 missiles used by the Vietnam People's Navy. "KCT-15" is known as the fifteenth project in the KCT program to master the operation of the Kh-35 missile, and the confusion may have arisen when the media took a picture of a Kh-35 look-alike model with the "KCT-15" designation, leading people to mistakenly believe that it was a Vietnamese project to locally produce the Kh-35 missiles; however, that model would be only used for training and studying purposes and it has little relationship with the project carried out by Viettel.

There is also no verified piece of information proving that the VCM-01 is a Kh-35 licensed-production, or any Russian major assistance in the project.

== Variations ==
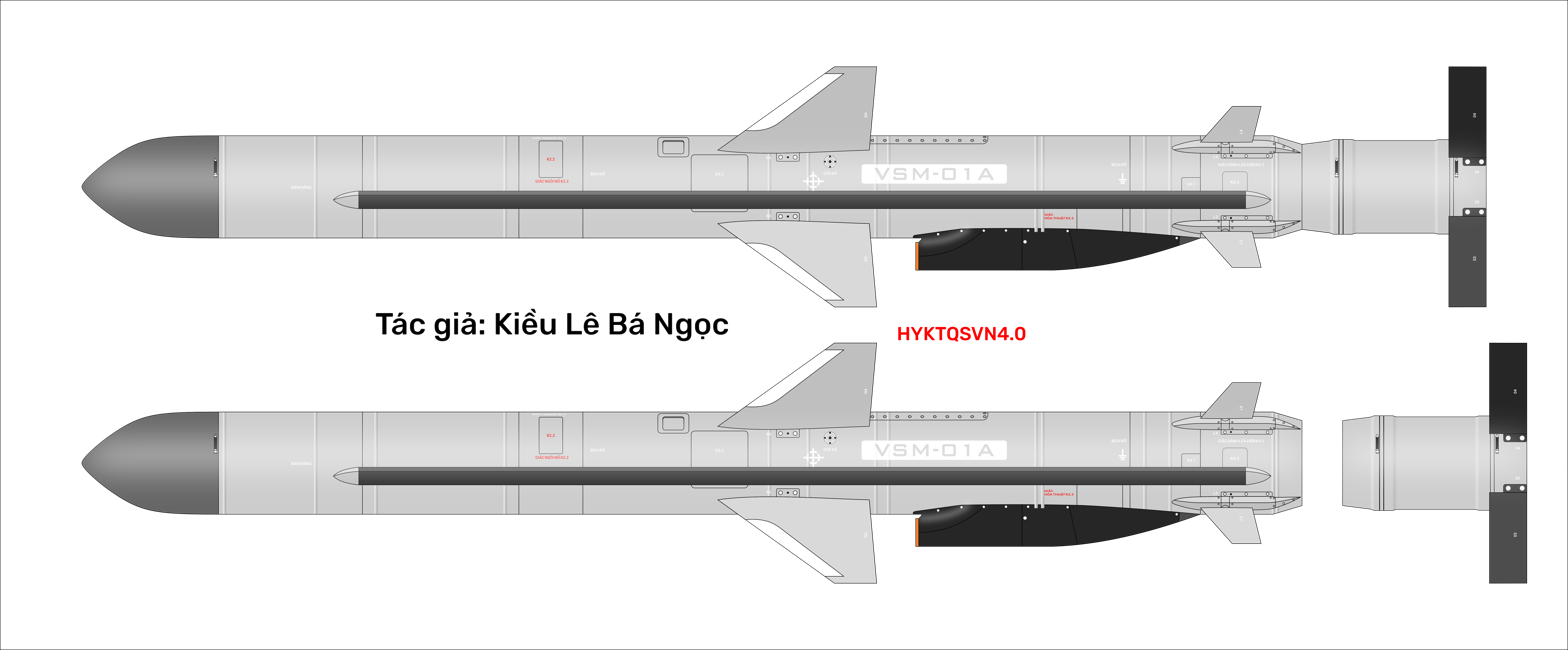
VSM-01A "Sông Hồng" Anti-ship Missile

- VSM-01A (codenamed Sông Hồng; lit. 'Red River') or VCM-01M - Short range anti-ship missile has a range of 80 km, subsonic speed, equipped with a VASK-03 seeker with a diameter of 272 mm, operating on the Ku band. It has a maximum target detection range of 20 km for destroyers and possesses high anti-jamming capabilities.
- VCM-02 The VCM-02 is an extended-range, anti-ship and land-attack cruise missile. Developed as a direct upgrade to the VCM-01M and VCM-01, it features a significantly longer attacking distance, effectively extending the operational reach of its platform. Equipped with an upgraded propulsion system and optimized fuel capacity, the VCM-02 boasts an operational range of approximately 300 km, allowing forces to strike high-value targets from a much safer standoff distance.
- VCM-06 The VCM-06 is a long-range cruise missile variant recently revealed in a broadcast by the Vietnamese state defense channel QPVN. Serving as a major strategic upgrade over the earlier VCM-01M and VCM-02 series, the VCM-06 doubles the engagement envelope of its predecessors. Featuring an enlarged airframe and an advanced propulsion system, it boasts an operational range of approximately 600 km, significantly extending Vietnam's long-range precision-strike and maritime-denial capabilities.
- VCM (IIR Variant) an advanced iteration of Vietnam's domestic VCM cruise missile family, recently revealed in a broadcast by the state defense channel QPVN. The definitive upgrade of this variant is the integration of an Imaging Infrared (IIR) seeker for terminal guidance, a significant leap over the standard active radar homing systems used in earlier models.

== Operators ==
Vietnam - Vietnam People's Army

- Naval Service
  - Brigade 679 (1st Regional Command)
  - Brigade 680 (3rd Regional Command )

== See also ==
The VCM-01 anti-ship missile is comparable and influenced by:

- Kh-35 Uran – (Russia)
- SSM-700K C-Star – (South Korea)
- R-360 Neptune – (Ukraine)
- RGM-84 Harpoon – (United States)
- MM40 Exocet – (France)
- YJ-83/C-802 variants – (China)
