= Lev Lyulyev =

- Born: Lev Veniaminovych Lyulyev; March 17, 1908; Kyiv, Russian Empire
- Died: November 1, 1985 (aged 77); Moscow, RSFSR, Soviet Union
- Occupation(s): Engineer, Chief designer of OKB-8

Lev Veniaminovych Lyulyev (Ukrainian: Лев Веніамінович Люльєв; March 17, 1908 – November 1, 1985) was a Soviet designer of artillery, anti-aircraft rockets, and SA missile systems. He was the chief designer of the OKB-8 (later NPO Novator which currently bears his name) between 1946 and 1985 and the Doctor of Technical Sciences (AS USSR, 1966). He was awarded the Hero of Socialist Labour twice in 1966 and in 1985 and was the Laureate of the 1967 Lenin and 1948 and 1977 State Prizes.

Lyulyev was educated at the Kyiv Polytechnic Institute (KPI) from 1927 to 1933. In 1941, he was evacuated to Sverdlovsk with the factory and appointed Vice Chief designer of the 8th Factory (known as JSC MZiK since 1994). In the years of the Second World War the factory produced about 20 thousand artillery guns and their mountings and participated in the modernisation process of the 85 mm KS-1 gun, also organising the production of 85 mm D-5 guns and 100 mm D-10 guns for the SAUs (self-propelled artillery vehicles) SU-85 and SU-100.

On June 25, 1945, Lyulyev was promoted to Chief designer of the Factory №8. 1945-1947 he developed the 85 mm zenith gun KS-18 and the experimental 100 mm zenith gun KS-19 in 1947, which became the prototype of the next generation zenith guns before the SA guided missiles came. He also started the development of 130 mm zenith gun KS-30.

In 1947, he was also appointed a chief designer of Sverdlovsk Machine-Building Plant №8, where he formed the Chief designer division (OGK) - later OKB-8 of the Ministry of Aviation Industry for the purpose of development of large caliber anti-aircraft artillery systems. In 1957, Lyulyec developed the most powerful KN-52 zenith gun. In 1958, OKB-8 decided to move to the development of anti-aircraft missile systems. Under his leadership those SA missiles were developed:

- 3M8 (developed since 1958, in service since 1965), 3M8M, 3M8M1 (in service since 1967), 3M8M2 (in service since 1971)
- 9M38, 9M38M1, 9M38M2 for the Buk missile system
- 9M82 (in service since 1988) and 9M83 (in service since 1983) for the S-300V
- 9M82M and 9M83M for the Antey 2500 SAM system
- Ural SA missile
- M-31 (KS-42, experimental, 1961)
- KS-168
- KS-172
- 3M54 Biryuza
- V-755
- counter-missile 5Ya26 (experimental, 1963) for the S-225
- counter-missile 53T6 (PRS-1) for the A-135 (in service since 1995)
- counter-missile 53T6M (PRS-1M, experimental, 1990th)
- counter-missile 51T6 (experimental, 1980th)
- naval antisubmarine missile complex Vyuga (since 1960), complex RPK-2, naval missile 81R (in service since 1969), export variant called Vysota
- target missile Virazh and Virazh-M on the basis of 3M8 и 3M8M
- counter-missile PRS-1M
- counter-missile 45T6
- naval antisubmarine missile complex RPK-6 Vodopad (in service since 1981)
- naval antisubmarine missile complex RPK-7 100RU (in service since 1984), export variant called Veter
- naval missile Alpha (experimental)
- naval missile RK-55
- antisubmarine missile UR-91R
- submarine missile 3M14
- target missile Mirazh

== Awards ==
- Hero of Socialist Labour, two times (1966, 1985)
- Three Orders of Lenin (1945, 1966, 1985)
- Two Orders of the Red Banner of Labour (1941, 1978)
- Order of the Red Star (1942)
- Order of the Badge of Honour (1944)
- Stalin Prize, 1st class (1948)
- Lenin Prize (1967)
- Order of the October Revolution (1971)
- USSR State Prize (1977)
