= Novator =

- Novator Partners - London-based private equity firm with links to Iceland
- NPO Novator - Russian missile design company formerly known as OKB Novator or OKB Lyulev
- Novator 9M729 - a Russian cruise missile
- Project Novator - a project of BT Group
- Novator (light armoured vehicle) - multipurpose infantry mobility vehicle designed by Ukrainian Armor
