= Russian submarine Bratsk =

Akula-class submarine of the Russian Navy

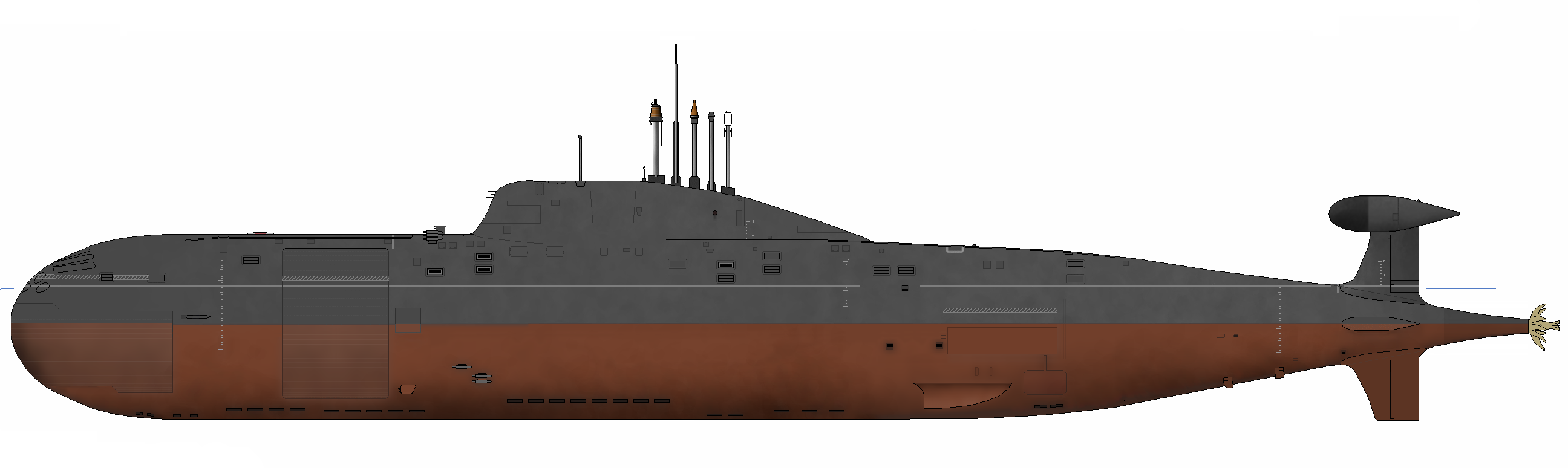
- Akula-class submarine

History

Russia
- Name: K-391
- Builder: Amur Shipyard, Komsomolsk-on-Amur
- Yard number: 514
- Laid down: 23 February 1988
- Launched: 14 April 1989
- Commissioned: 29 December 1989
- Renamed: Bratsk; (Братск)
- Namesake: Bratsk
- Decommissioned: 2022
- Identification: Pennant number: 990
- Status: Awaiting scrapping

General characteristics
- Class & type: Akula-class submarine
- Displacement: 8,010–14,470 long tons (8,140–14,700 t) surfaced; 12,570 long tons (12,770 t) submerged
- Length: 110.3 m (361 ft 11 in) maximum
- Beam: 13.6 m (44 ft 7 in)
- Draught: 9.7 m (31 ft 10 in)
- Propulsion: one 190 MW OK-650B/OK-650M pressurized water nuclear reactor (HEU <= 45%); 1 OK-7 steam turbine 43,000 hp (32 MW); 2 OK-2 Turbogenerators producing 2 MW; 1 seven-bladed propeller; 2 OK-300 retractable electric propulsors for low-speed and quiet maneuvering at 5 knots (9.3 km/h; 5.8 mph)
- Speed: 10 knots (19 km/h; 12 mph) surfaced; 28–35 knots (52–65 km/h; 32–40 mph) submerged
- Endurance: 100 days
- Test depth: 480 m (1,570 ft)
- Complement: 73
- Sensors & processing systems: MGK-500 or 540 active/passive suite; Flank arrays; Pelamida towed array sonar; MG-70 mine detection sonar
- Electronic warfare & decoys: Bukhta ESM/ECM; MG-74 Korund noise simulation decoys (fired from external tubes); MT-70 Sonar intercept receiver; Nikhrom-M IFF
- Armament: 4 × 533 mm torpedo tubes (28 torpedoes) and 4 × 650 mm torpedo tubes (12 torpedoes).; 1–3 × Igla-M surface-to-air missile launcher fired from sail (surface use only); Granat cruise missiles, now Kalibr
- Notes: Chiblis Surface Search radar; Medvyeditsa-945 Navigation system; Molniya-M Satellite communications; MGK-80 Underwater communications; Tsunami, Kiparis, Anis, Sintez and Kora Communications antennas; Paravan Towed VLF Antenna; Vspletsk Combat direction system

K-391 Bratsk is an Akula-class submarine in the Russian Navy.

== Design ==
Project 971 has a double-hull design. The robust body is made of high-quality alloy steel with σт = 1 GPa (10,000 kgf / cm²). To simplify the installation of equipment, the boat was designed using zonal blocks, which made it possible to transfer a significant amount of work from the cramped conditions of the sub's compartments directly to the workshop. After completion of the installation, the zonal unit is “rolled” into the hull of the boat and connected to the main cables and pipelines of the ship's systems. A two-stage damping system is used: all mechanisms are placed on damped foundations, in addition, each zone unit is isolated from the body by rubber-cord pneumatic shock absorbers. In addition to reducing the overall noise level of nuclear submarines, such a scheme can reduce the impact of underwater explosions on equipment and crew. The boat has a developed vertical tail unit with a streamlined boule, in which the towed antenna is located. Also on the submarine are two reclining thrusters and retractable bow horizontal rudders with flaps. A feature of the project is the smoothly mated connection of the tail unit to the hull. This is done to reduce noise-generating hydrodynamic eddies.

Power supply is carried out by a nuclear power plant. The lead boat, K-284 Akula, is equipped with an OK-650M.01 pressurized water-cooled nuclear reactor. On later orders, the AEU has minor improvements. Some sources report that subsequent boats are equipped with OK-9VM reactors. The thermal power of the reactor is 190 MW, the shaft power is 50,000 liters. with. Two auxiliary electric motors in the hinged outboard columns have a capacity of 410 hp. with., there is one diesel generator ASDG-1000.

== Construction and career ==
The submarine was laid down on 22 February 1989 at Amur Shipyard, Komsomolsk-on-Amur. Launched on 14 April 1989 and commissioned on 29 December 1989.

On 13 January 1990, the USSR naval flag was raised on the submarine.

On 28 February 1990, it became part of the 45th Submarine Division of the 2nd FLPL of the Pacific Fleet based at Vilyuchinsk (Krasheninnikov Bay). During 1990, extended acoustic tests were carried out on the K-391, after which various works were carried out on the submarine to denoise the submarine. For mastering new equipment and weapons, Commander Captain 1st Rank SA Golobokov and Senior Assistant Commander Captain 2nd Rank S. M Igishev were awarded the Order For Service to the Motherland in the USSR Armed Forces, 3rd degree.

From 10 September to 25 November 1991, K-391 under the command of Captain 2nd Rank S.M. Igishev (senior captain of the 1st RPGK K.S. Sidenko aboard the ZKD) combat service. During the execution of the BS missions, 12 detections of foreign submarines were made, with continuous tracking for 380 hours. This result is still a record among the anti-submarine forces of the Navy. Upon completion of this BS, 36 officers and warrant officers of the crew were awarded government awards.

On 28 April 1992, it was reclassified as a nuclear cruising submarine. During 1992, torpedoes were fired with homing equipment, which was adopted by the Russian Navy based on the results of these tests.

On 13 April 1993, it received the name Kit. From 30 September to 31 December, performing combat duty tasks under the command of Captain 2nd Rank S. M. Igishev (senior on board Rear Admiral Yu. V. Kirillov). On 2 December, for the first time in the history of the Navy, the successful firing of two cruise missiles of the C-10 Granat complex with different flight missions from the same combat area was carried out, which was highly appreciated by the command of the fleet.

On 1 April 1994, the K-391 Kit was withdrawn from the permanent readiness forces.

In February 1996, the submarine was accepted by the crew of the K-152 Nerpa, commanded by Captain 2nd Rank SS Demin. During the development of combat training tasks, a US Navy nuclear submarine of the Los-Angeles-class was discovered, which was monitored for four hours. During the tracking, the tactics of its actions were studied and the method of anti-submarine warfare was worked out. After passing the course training tasks, the crew entered the 1st line. On 25 February 1997, the submarine was added to the PG forces.

On 10 September 1997, by order of the Civil Code of the Russian Navy, after establishing patronage ties with the administration of the city of Bratsk, the submarine received the name Bratsk.

On 1 May 1998, the submarine was listed in the 10th DPL of the 2nd FLPL. On 1 September, the 10th Submarine Division was reorganized into the 16th OpEskPL.

In October 2003, the submarine was delivered to the North-Eastern Repair Center (SVRTs) for repair and modernization, and the crew was reassigned to the 201st DPRPL of the Pacific Fleet.

Only in 2008, the submarine was introduced into the PD-71 for repairs.

In the summer of 2013, due to the inability of the SVRTs to carry out repairs with modernization, it was decided to repair Bratsk at another plant. In the summer of 2014, the Severodvinsk Zvezdochka plant was selected for the upcoming work.

On 26 September 2014, K-391 Bratsk and K-295 Samara were delivered by the Dutch dock ship Transshelf along the Northern Sea Route from Kamchatka to Severodvinsk.

Close inspection at Severodvinsk of the K-391, showed that the condition of the submarine was poor. According to a source in the russian defence ministry, the submarine is in too poor condition to be renovated, and will therefore be scrapped.
