= AAAM =

AAAM may refer to:

- Association for the Advancement of Automotive Medicine
- AIM-152 AAAM, a long range missile
