= 3M-51 Alfa =

Russian anti-ship missile

P-900A 3M51 Alfa AFM-L
- Type: Cruise missile Air-launched cruise missile Anti-ship missile Submarine-launched cruise missile Land-attack missile Surface-to-surface missile
- Place of origin: Russia

Service history
- Used by: Russian Navy

Production history
- Designer: OKB-52/NPO Mashinostroyeniya Chelomey
- Designed: 1993-
- Manufacturer: NPO Mashinostroyeniya, NPO Novator
- Produced: developed into 3M54

Specifications
- Mass: 2,600 kg (5,730 lb.) ship, submarine and coastal variants; 1,600 kg. (3,527 lb.) air-launched variant
- Length: 8.0 m
- Warhead: 300 kg (661 lb)
- Engine: Turbojet and rocket
- Propellant: Liquid, solid
- Operational range: 250 km
- Maximum speed: Cruise subsonic, Attack Mach 2.5 - 700 m/s
- Guidance system: Active Radar
- Launch platform: Standard transport launching container (TLC) for all non-air launched variants

The P-900 Alfa (or also P-900A Alfa) П-900 3М51 Альфа Alfa AFM-L, GRAU designation 3M51, is an anti-ship missile (with LACM capabilities) developed from the 3M54 Kalibr, P-800 Oniks and P-700 Granit.

The missile has a Granit type engine. It can be operated on new Yasen-class submarine, and can be loaded on ships. Coastal versions of the anti-ship missile are under development. The missile is developed at NPO Mashinostroyeniya.

3M-51 Alfa is also designated as Novator KTRV, Morinform Agat, 3M54, 3M54E and P-900 types.

The new cruise missile was designed for use in the Russian Navy. Modernization of Kirov-class battlecruiser, other new battlecruisers, destroyers and cruisers may include 3M-51 Alfa that can be refitted on ships with existing Zircon, Grom Meteorit, GELA, P1200 Bolid or P-1000 Vulkan missile launchers.

Despite a secrecy surrounding the new missile, it can be presumed that it holds promise as an exportable weapons system.

== See also ==
- Yasen-class submarine – (Russia)
- Qader – (Iran)
- Storm Shadow – (France, United Kingdom)
- Atmaca – (Turkey)
- Babur – (Pakistan)
- SOM – (Turkey)
- Noor ASCM – (Iran)
- Zafar – (Iran)
- Khalij Fars – (Iran)
- 3M-54 Klub – (Russia)
- BrahMos – (India, Russia)
- BrahMos-II – (India, Russia)
- Kh-90 – (Russia)
- Future Cruise/Anti-Ship Weapon – (France, Italy, United Kingdom)
