= Novator KS-172 =

Abortive Russo-Indian long-range air-to-air missile program

KS-172
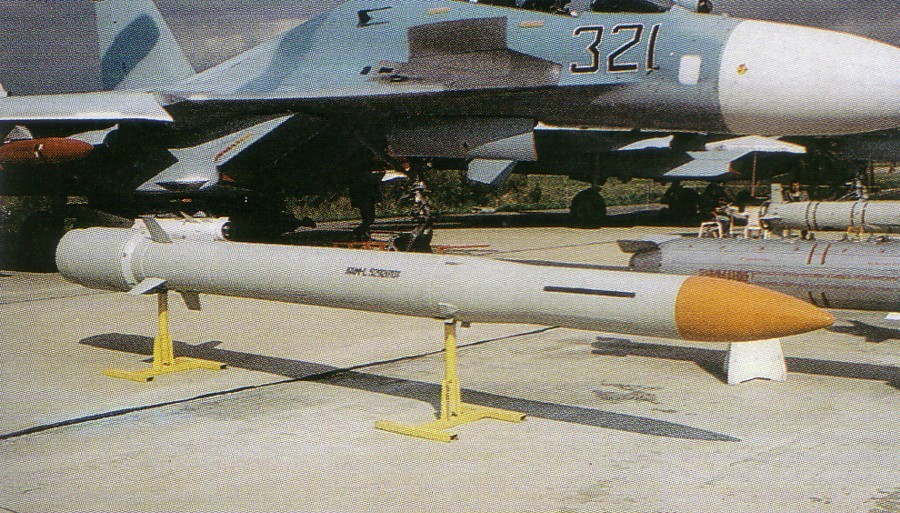
- Mockup of KS–172 in front of Su-30 in 1994
- Type: Long range air-to-air missile
- Place of origin: Russia/India

Service history
- In service: N/A(;)
- Used by: Russian Air Force

Production history
- Designer: NPO Novator
- Designed: 1991
- Manufacturer: NPO Novator; Defence Research and Development Organisation

Specifications
- Mass: 748 kg (1,650 lb) (KS–172)
- Length: 6.01 m (19.7 ft) + 1.4 m (4.6 ft) (KS–172)
- Diameter: 40 cm (16 in) (KS–172)
- Wingspan: 61 cm (24 in) (KS–172)
- Warhead: HE fragmentation (KS–172)
- Warhead weight: 50 kg (110 lb)
- Engine: Tandem rocket booster (KS–172)
- Propellant: Solid fuel
- Operational range: At least 200 km, possibly 300–400 km (160–210 nmi)
- Flight altitude: 3 m (9.8 ft)–30,000 m (98,000 ft) (KS–172)
- Maximum speed: 4,000 km/h (2,500 mph; 1.1 km/s; Mach 3.3) (KS–172)
- Guidance system: Mid-course: Inertial navigation with mid-course guidance Terminal: Active radar homing (KS–172)
- Launch platform: Su-27, Su-30, Su-35, Su-30MKI, (proposed), MiG-31BM

The Novator KS-172 is a Russian air-to-air missile project designed as an "AWACS killer" at ranges up to 400 km. The missile had various names during its history, including K-100, Izdeliye 172 ('project 172'), AAM-L (RVV-L), KS–172, KS-1, 172S-1 and R-172. Development stalled in the mid-1990s for lack of funds.

== Development ==
NPO Novator started work in 1991 on a very long-range air-to-air missile with the Russian project designation Izdeliye 172. Initially called the AAM-L (RVV-L), it made its first public appearance at the International Defence Exhibition in Abu Dhabi in early 1993, followed by the Moscow Air Show later that year.

The missile resurfaced as the KS–172 in 1999, as part of a new export-led strategy whereby foreign investment in a 300 km (160 nmi)-range export model would ultimately fund a version for the Russian Air Force.

In late 2003, the missile was offered again on the export market as the 172S-1. In March 2004, India was reported to have invested in the project and to be "negotiating a partnership" to develop the "R-172". In May 2005 the Indians were said to have finalised "an arrangement to fund final development and licence produce the weapon" in a joint venture similar to that which produced the successful BrahMos cruise missile. Since then the missile has had a higher profile, appearing at the 2005 Moscow Air Show on a Su-30 as the K-172, and a modified version being shown at the 2007 Moscow Air Show designated as the K-100-1. This name first appeared in a Sukhoi document in 2006, and sources such as Jane's now refer to the missile as the K-100. Supposedly the development was stopped and the project closed by 2010. However, reports which appeared in May 2025 indicated that the missile has entered service with the Russian Air Force to arm the upgraded Mikoyan MiG-31BM interceptor aircraft.

== Design ==
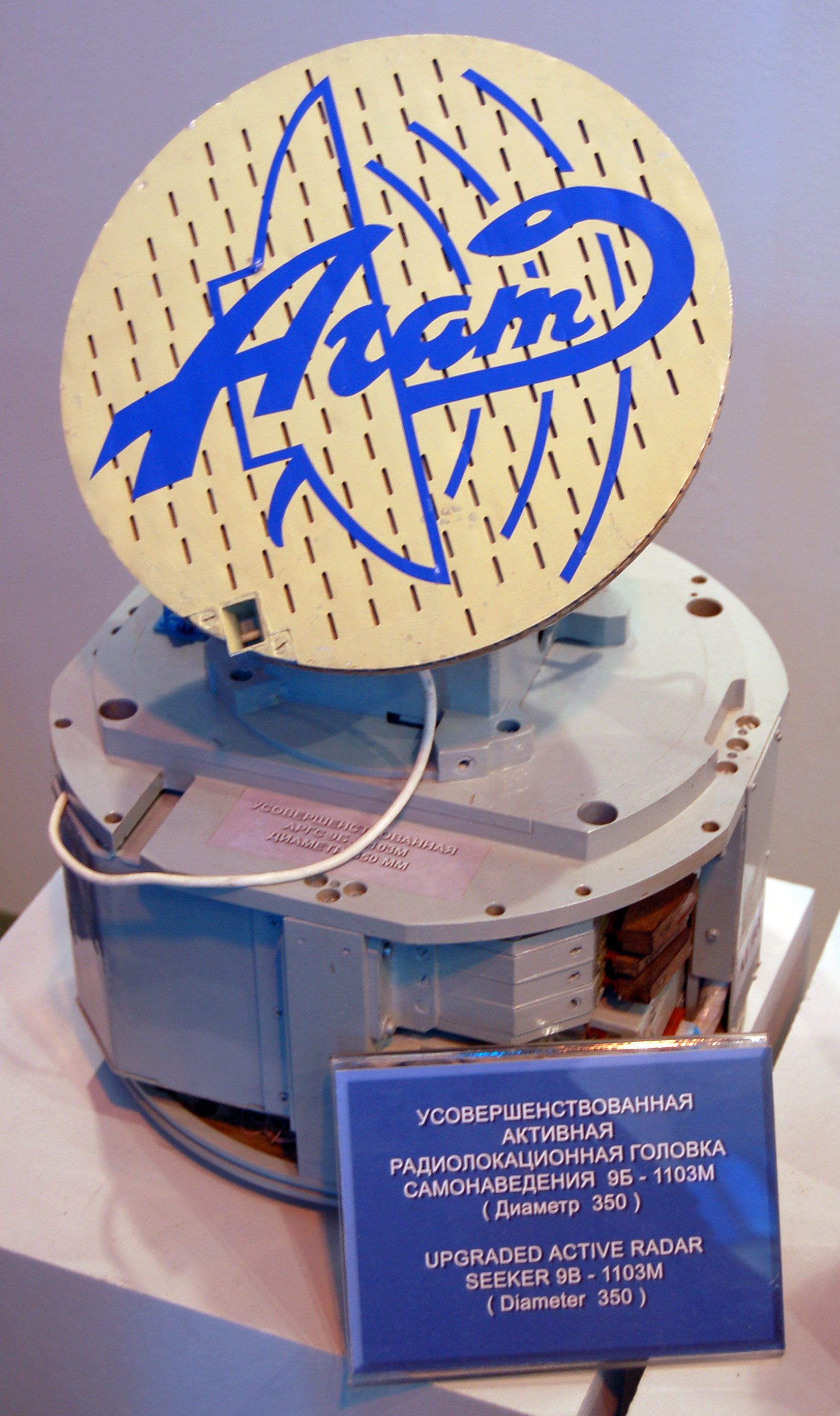
9B-1103M Seeker head

An Indian magazine gave the specifications of the KS–172 in April 2004 as a core 6.01 m long and 40 cm in diameter with a wingspan of 61 cm, with a booster of 1.4 m, and 748 kg total weight. It had a solid fuel tandem rocket booster capable of speeds up to 4,000 km/h (2,500 mph), 12g manoeuvring, and an adaptive HE fragmentation warhead. Development would concentrate on the seeker head, autopilot, resistance to jamming and a steering system with 3D thrust vector control (TVC).

In May 2005 it was reported that there were two versions, with and without a rocket booster, with ranges of 400 km and 300 km respectively. At the MAKS (air show) in August 2005, a range of 300 km was quoted for a streamlined missile with a small booster and fins on both booster and fuselage. However the model shown at the 2007 MAKS air show under the name K-100 was closer to the original 1993 mockup in the photo above, with different-shaped fins that were further up the fuselage, and an even larger booster with TVC vents.

Guidance is by inertial navigation until the missile is close enough to the target to use active radar for terminal homing. The K-100 has an enlarged (350 mm (14 in)) derivative of the Agat 9B-1103M seeker used in the R-27 (air-to-air missile) (AA-10 'Alamo'). It has a lock-on range of 40 km (22 nmi), described by an Agat designer as "one fifth or less of the overall range".

== Variants ==
- KS-172

Prototype in 1993.

- KS-172S-1

Prototype in 2003.

== Similar weapons ==
- R-37 (missile) (AA-X-13/AA-13 'Arrow') was developed from the R-33 (missile) (AA-9 'Amos') and is intended for the Sukhoi Su-35 Flanker-E, Sukhoi Su-37 Flanker-F, MiG 1.42 MFI and other future fighters. According to Defence Today the range depends on the flight profile, from 80 nautical miles (150 km) for a direct shot to 215 nautical miles (398 km) for a cruise glide profile. Jane's reports two variants, the R-37 and the R-37M; the latter has a jettisonable rocket booster that increases the range to "300-400km" (160–220nmi). Work on the missile appears to have restarted in late 2006, as part of the MiG-31BM programme to update the Foxhound with a new radar and ground attack capability.
- Kh-31 (AS-17 'Krypton') – the Chinese have licensed the anti-radar version (Kh-31P) of this Russian air-to-surface missile, and may be working on an "AWACS killer" variant of their YJ-91 derivative. The Russians claim the anti-shipping version, the Kh-31A, can be adapted for use as an AWACS killer.
- AIM-54 Phoenix – Now retired, a 100 nautical miles (190 km)-range missile that was carried by the US Navy's F-14 Tomcat.
- AIM-152 AAAM - intended to replace the AIM-54 Phoenix but cancelled after the Cold War ended.
- AIM-97 Seekbat - based on the Standard Missile SAM, the Seekbat was an extremely long-ranged missile designed to shoot down the MiG-25 Foxbat, which at the time had almost mythical performance estimates. When the real-world performance of the Foxbat was found to be dramatically less impressive, development was cancelled.
- AIM-174B Gunslinger - an American long-range naval surface-to-air missile that was developed into the AIM-174B Gunslinger, an air-launched version of the RIM-174 Standard ERAM / SM-6 for the US Navy.
- AIM-260 JATM - successor to AIM-120 AMRAAM

== See also ==
- AIM-152 AAAM – (United States)
- FMRAAM – (United States)
- Meteor – (France, United Kingdom, Italy, Germany, Spain, Sweden)
- R-37 – (Russia)
- PL-21 – (China)
