= AIM-152 AAAM =

Abortive American long-range air-to-air missile

Concept by Hughes/Raytheon/McDonnell Douglas at the top, GD/Westinghouse at the bottom

The AIM-152 Advanced Air-to-Air Missile (AAAM) was a long-range air-to-air missile developed by the United States. The AIM-152 was intended to serve as the successor to the AIM-54 Phoenix. The program went through a protracted development stage but was never adopted by the United States Navy, due to the ending of the Cold War and the reduction in threat of its perceived primary target, Soviet supersonic bombers. Development was cancelled in 1992.

== Overview ==
The AIM-152 originated in a U.S. Navy requirement for an advanced air-to-air missile to replace the AIM-54 Phoenix. By the mid-1980s, the Phoenix was seen to be no longer cutting edge, and the Navy wanted a long-range missile to counter the Soviet Tu-22M Backfire and Tu-160 Blackjack long-range supersonic bombers. The goal was to produce a smaller and lighter weapon than the Phoenix, with equal or better range and a flight speed of Mach 3 or more. The missile would be mounted on the F-14 Tomcat as well as its planned successor from the Navy Advanced Tactical Fighter (NATF) program.

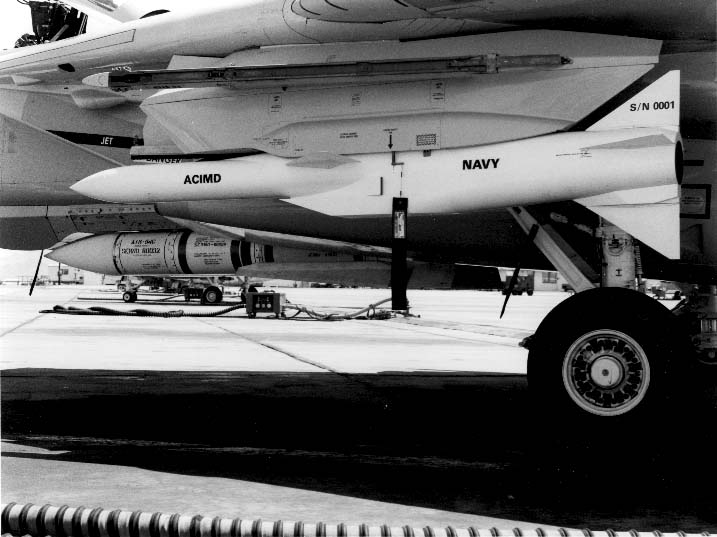
An ACIMD demonstrator on an F-14 at the NWC China Lake.

Some of the systems considered for the missile had already been evaluated by the China Lake Naval Weapons Center in the early 1980s as part of the Advanced Common Intercept Missile Demonstration (ACIMD) program. ACIMD missiles had been built, but none had flown by the time the project was canceled. In 1987, Hughes/Raytheon/McDonnell Douglas and General Dynamics/Westinghouse were selected to produce competing designs for the AIM-152.

The Hughes/Raytheon/McDonnell Douglas design was largely based on the ACIMD missile, with a hybrid ramjet/solid rocket engine, which offered high speeds. The missile would use an inertial guidance system with terminal guidance provided by active radar homing—a mode of flight that would later be employed in the AIM-120 AMRAAM. An infrared terminal homing seeker was also planned, which would allow the missile to engage without actively emitting and alerting the target.

In the James Smith McDonnell Prologue Room (Museum) in St. Louis, there is a Mockup model, of the Hughes/Raytheon/McDonnell Douglas design with a plate on it, where is written that several test missiles were built but never flown before the program was canceled. Also interesting is the fact that as launch platform the McDonnell Douglas F/A-18 Hornet is mentioned, but not the F-14.

The GD/Westinghouse design was smaller, with a multiple-pulse pure solid rocket motor. It also had an inertial guidance system, but mid-course updating was provided via a dual-band semi-active radar. Terminal guidance was via an electro-optical sensor, with a backup infrared seeker also included. One flaw of semi-active radar homing is that the launch aircraft must illuminate the target with its radar during flight, meaning that it must fly towards the enemy and so expose itself to greater danger. GD/Westinghouse planned to avoid this by equipping the launching aircraft with a radar pod that could illuminate the target from both forward and aft, allowing it to turn and escape while still providing a target for the missile.

With the fall of the Soviet Union, the threat from Russian bombers effectively ended, and since no other nation could match the previous threat, the AAAM was left without an enemy to defend against. The project was canceled in 1992, shortly after the YAIM-152A designation had been given to the two prototypes.

With the phasing out of the Phoenix missile, the US Navy lost its long-range AAM capability, instead adopting the AIM-120 Advanced Medium Range Air-to-Air Missile (AMRAAM). While early variants of the AMRAAM had a range of only 20-30 mi (32-48 km), the loss of the AIM-54 Phoenix’s range would eventually be offset with later AMRAAM variants, with the AIM-120D capable of 100-112 mi (161-180 km) launches.

== Specifications ==
(Note that the YAIM-152A missiles were never built, and as a result any specifications are speculative.)

Hughes/Raytheon :

- Length: 3.66 m (12 ft)
- Diameter: 231 mm (9 in)
- Weight: < 300 kg (660 lb)
- Speed: > Mach 3
- Range: > 185 km (115 miles) (100 nm)
- Propulsion: Rocket/ramjet engine
- Warhead: 14 to 23 kg (30 to 50 lb) blast-fragmentation

GD/Westinghouse :

- Length: 3.66 m (12 ft)
- Diameter: 140 mm (5.5 in)
- Weight: 172 kg (380 lb)
- Speed: > Mach 3
- Range: > 185 km (100 nm) (115 miles)
- Propulsion: Multiple-pulse solid-propellant rocket
- Warhead: 14 to 23 kg (30 to 50 lb) blast-fragmentation

== See also ==
- FMRAAM – (United States)
- Meteor (missile) – (France, United Kingdom, Italy, Germany, Spain, Sweden)
- R-37 (missile) – (Russia)
- Novator KS-172 – (Russia)
- PL-21 – (China)
- AIM-174B – (United States)
- AIM-260 JATM – (United States)
