= Kalibr (missile family) =

Family of Russian cruise missiles

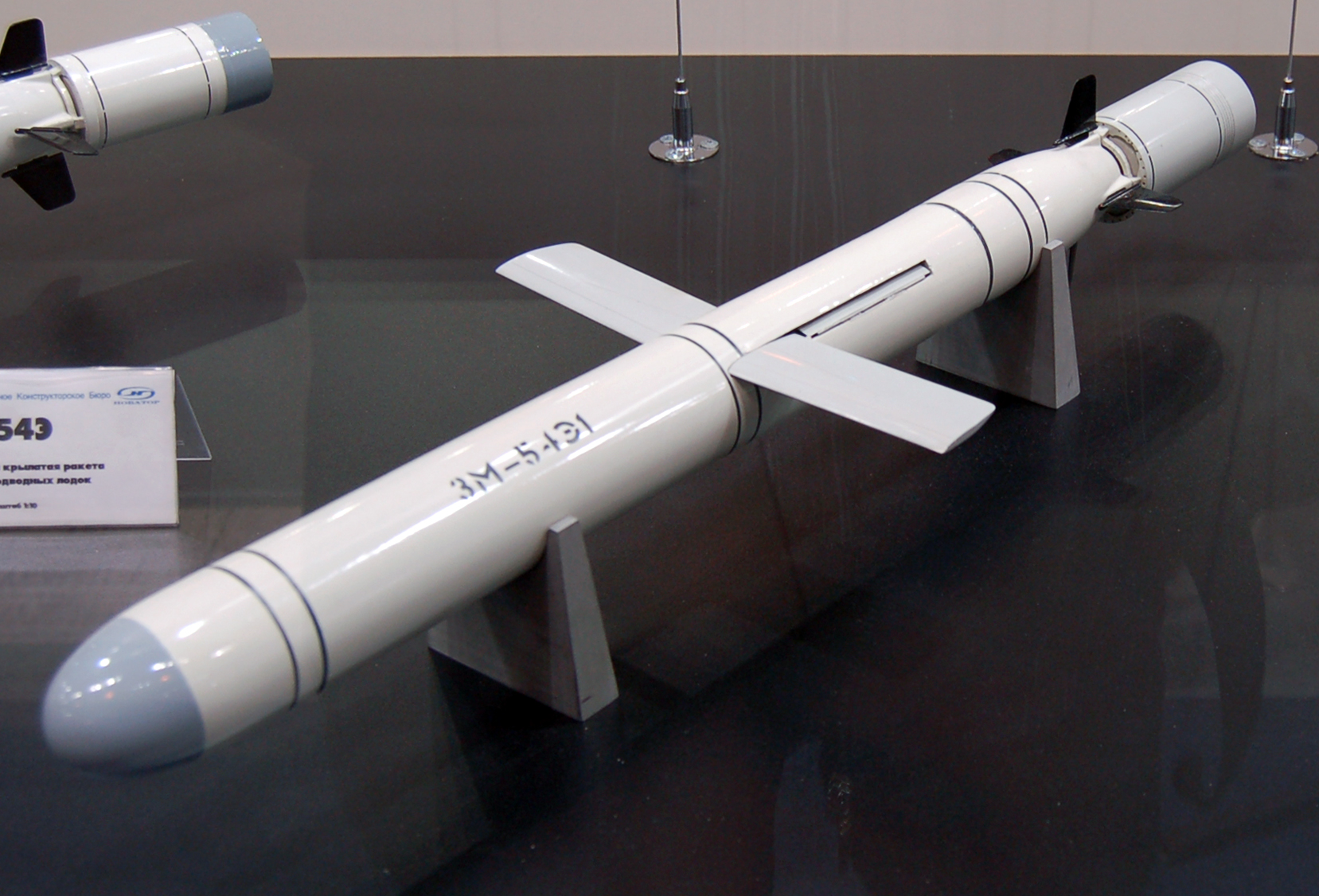
- An export variant of the missile (mockup)
- Type: Cruise missile Anti-ship missile
- Place of origin: Russia

Service history
- In service: 1994
- Used by: See Operators
- Wars: Syrian Civil War; Russo-Ukrainian War

Production history
- Manufacturer: Novator Design Bureau, KTRV, MKB Fakel, NPO Mash, Raduga, NPO Zvezda Strela (Orenburg)
- Unit cost: $980,000 (domestic cost, land-attack version) $6.5 million (export cost, anti-ship version)
- Produced: 1994–present

Specifications
- Mass: Varies on variant, from 1,300 kg-1,780 kg-2,300 kg
- Length: Varies on variant, from 6.2 m to 8.9 m
- Diameter: (ca. 0.514 m) 0.533 m
- Warhead: 400–500 kg
- Engine: Multi-stage solid-fuel rocket, turbojet engine for 3M-54/E/TE/E1/TE1, -14/E/TE
- Operational range: 3M54E (export anti-ship version): 220 km 3M54E1/3M14E (export anti-ship version): 300 km 3M54K/3M54T: 660 km (domestic anti-ship version, estimate) 3M14K/3M14T: 1,500–2,500 km (domestic land-attack version, estimate)
- Flight ceiling: 1,000 m
- Flight altitude: 50–150 m AGL; 20 m over water
- Maximum speed: Mach 0.8
- Guidance system: Inertial guidance plus terminal active radar homing
- Accuracy: 2–3 m (domestic version, with GLONASS); 50 m CEP (Club-T export version, without GLONASS)
- Launch platform: naval ships, submarines, containers, TEL

The Novator Kalibr (Калибр, caliber), also referred to as 3M54-1 Kalibr, 3M14 Biryuza (Бирюза, turquoise), (NATO reporting name SS-N-27 Sizzler and SS-N-30A) is a family of Russian cruise missiles developed by NPO Novator (OKB-8). It first saw service in 1994. There are ship-launched, submarine-launched and air-launched versions of the missile, and variants for anti-ship and land attack use. The missile can carry a conventional or nuclear warhead weighing up to 500 kilograms (1,100 lb).

== Design ==
The missile is a modular system with several versions: two anti-shipping types, and one for land attack. The missile is designed to share common parts between the surface and submarine-launched variants but each missile consists of different components, for example, the booster. The missile can be launched from a surface ship using a vertical launching system (VLS).

It has a booster with thrust vectoring capability. The missile launched from a submarine torpedo tube has no need for such an addition but has a conventional booster instead. The air launched version is held in a container that is dropped as the missile launches, detaching from the container.

There are several claims about the maximum range of Kalibr land attack versions in use by Russia. The U.S. Department of Defense estimates its range at 1,400 km (870 mi), and Russian Defence Minister Sergei Shoigu put its range at "almost 1,500 km (930 mi)." Following its first operational firing in October 2015, Russian Ministry of Defence statements suggested a range of 2,000 km (1,200 mi), while a December 2015 Office of Naval Intelligence report gathered a number of Russian statements projecting ranges between 1,500-2,500 km (1,600 mi).

Discrepancies in range values may be political declarations for strategic effect, or potentially longer 2,500 km-range claims could be associated with a thermonuclear armed variant while shorter 1,500 km-range estimates are for the conventionally armed missile.

Launch of production of a submarine-variant of the 3M14TE Kalibr-NK called the Kalibr-PL missile occurred in 2012, according to state television news (broadcast of 11.10.2015).

Russia has improved the targeting system of its ship- and submarine-launched Kalibr cruise missiles to improve their ability to conduct time sensitive attacks. Defence Minister Sergei Shoigu revealed the development, which was initiated as a result of combat experience in Syria, in an interview with the Moskovsky Komsomolets newspaper on 22 September 2019.

=== Launch platforms ===
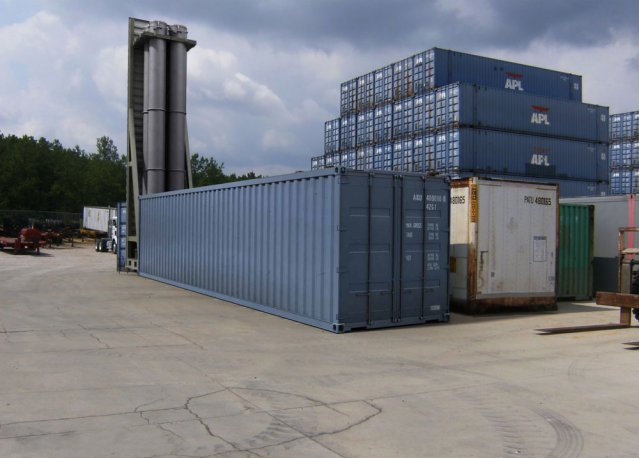
A Club-K erected in a standard shipping container

==== Club-K ====
Club-K – a Russian container complex of missile weapons, placed in the standard 20- and 40-foot sea container. It is designed to defeat surface and ground targets. The complex can be mounted on shorelines, vessels of various classes, rail platforms and trucks. It is a modification of the Kalibr missile system.

A Club-K variant, which is disguised as a shipping container that can be placed on a truck, train, or merchant vessel, was advertised in 2010 and was shown for the first time at the MAKS 2011 air show.

== Operational history ==
=== Russian military intervention in the Syrian civil war ===
- On 7 October 2015, a Gepard class frigate and three Buyan-M class Russian Navy corvettes, part of the Caspian Flotilla launched 26 Kalibr-NK system cruise missiles 3M14T from the Caspian Sea at 11 targets in Syria during the Syrian Civil War. The missiles traveled 1,500 km (932 mi) through Iranian and Iraqi airspace and struck targets in Raqqa and Aleppo provinces (controlled by the Islamic State) but primarily in Idlib province (controlled by the Free Syrian Army and Nusra Front). Anonymous US DoD officials alleged that four missiles crashed in Iran. Russian and Iranian governments denied the claim of missile crash. Pentagon and State Department officials refused to comment on the reports. Russia posted video footage of 26 Kalibr missile launches as well as several videos of missile impacts without time or location information.
- On 20 November 2015, Russia launched 18 3M14T cruise missiles from the Caspian Sea onto targets in Syria, the targets were in Raqqa, Idlib and Aleppo.
- On 9 December 2015, Russia fired a group of 3M14K cruise missiles from Kalibr-PL system at positions occupied by ISIL from the Improved Kilo-class submarine B-237 Rostov-on-Don deployed in the Mediterranean.
- On 20 September 2016, Russian state media reported that Russian warships in the Mediterranean fired three Kalibr-NK missiles at western Aleppo, near Mount Simeon. The Russians claimed that the missile strike killed "30 Israeli and Western officers directing the terrorists' attacks in Aleppo and Idlib".
- On 15 November 2016, Russian frigate Admiral Grigorovich fired at least three missiles against targets in Idlib and Homs provinces, Syria, in the opening stages of the decisive offensive on Aleppo.
- On 31 May 2017, the Russian frigate Admiral Essen and submarine Krasnodar launched four missiles against targets east of Palmyra, Syria.
- On 23 June 2017, Russian frigates Admiral Grigorovich and Admiral Essen, and the submarine Krasnodar fired six Kalibr missiles at ISIL arms depot targets in Hama.
- On 14 September 2017, the Russian submarines Veliky Novgorod and Kolpino fired seven Kalibr missiles on ISIL targets (command posts, communications centers and ammunition depots) in the south-east of Deir ez-Zor.
- On 22 September 2017, the Russian submarine Veliky Novgorod fired at least three Kalibr missiles on al-Nusra in the Idlib province. The missile strike destroyed command centers, training bases and armored vehicles.
- On 5 October 2017, the Russian submarines Veliky Novgorod and Kolpino launched 10 Kalibr missiles. The strikes were to support Syrian troops conducting a ground offensive in Deir-ez-Zor province.
- On 3 November 2017, the Russian submarine Kolpino launched 6 Kalibr missiles from a submerged position. Missiles hit terrorists' strongholds, weapon and ammunition depots, concentrations of militants, and important command centres near Abu Kamal, Deir-ez-Zor.
- On 3 February 2018, Russian frigates and submarines active in the Mediterranean sea launched several Kalibr missiles on the positions of rebels in the Idlib province, Syria where the Sukhoi Su-25 attack aircraft of Major Roman Filipov was shot down. The Russian ministry of defence said that more than 30 rebel fighters were killed.

=== 2022 Russian invasion of Ukraine ===
Kalibr cruise missiles have been widely used by Russian forces since the start of the 2022 Russian invasion of Ukraine on 24 February 2022. The opening assault is said to have included at least 30 cruise missiles, targeting command and control points, air bases, and air-defense batteries. The missiles were likely fired by the Buyan-class corvettes, Admiral Grigorovich-class frigates and Kilo-class submarines of the Russian Black Sea Fleet. Ukraine's military command reported widespread usage of Kalibr cruise missiles in strikes against strategic and non-combat targets across Ukraine. Most notable incidents were:

- On 14 July 2022, three Kalibr cruise missiles hit the city center of Vinnytsia, Ukraine, killing at least 20 people, including at least three children. Ukraine claimed two other missiles were shot down.
- On 23 July 2022, at least two Kalibr cruise missiles hit the port of Odesa, other two were reportedly shot down.
- On 11 September 2022, Kalibr cruise missiles were again fired from the Black Sea on targets in Ukraine. The same day, missile strike on Kharkiv TEC-5 thermal power plant in Kharkiv was confirmed by Ukrainian officials.
- During 2022 Russian strikes against Ukrainian infrastructure in October, November and December 2022, number of Kalibr cruise missiles fired from the Black Sea targeted various Ukrainian energy facilities across the country. This led to destruction of at least 50% of Ukraine's energy sector by mid-November 2022.
  - On 10 October 2022, three Kalibr cruise missiles violated the airspace of the Republic of Moldova.
  - On 31 October 2022, remains of a Kalibr missile reportedly shot down by Ukrainian air defence crashed in Moldova.
- On 20 March 2023, Ukraine claimed Russian Kalibr cruise missiles had been involved in an explosion in the north of annexed Crimea. Ukraine announced the explosions but, as is normal, did not explicitly say it was behind the attack.

== Variants ==
Domestic variants are basic versions of this missile family; these are the 3M54 anti-ship model, the 3M14 land attack model, the 91R anti-submarine model, which is used on the Otvet complex, and 3M51 variants. The export model is called Club (formerly Klub). There are two major launch platforms: the Kalibr-PL (Note: stands for "Podvodnaya Lodka", which means "Underwater boat" -- or simply "submarine" -- in Russian) (export Club-S), designed for use from submarines, and the Kalibr-NK (Note: stands for "Nadvodny Korabl'", which means "surface ship" in Russian) (export Club-N), designed for surface ships. These two launch platforms can be equipped with the following warhead and guidance combinations:

=== Gallery ===
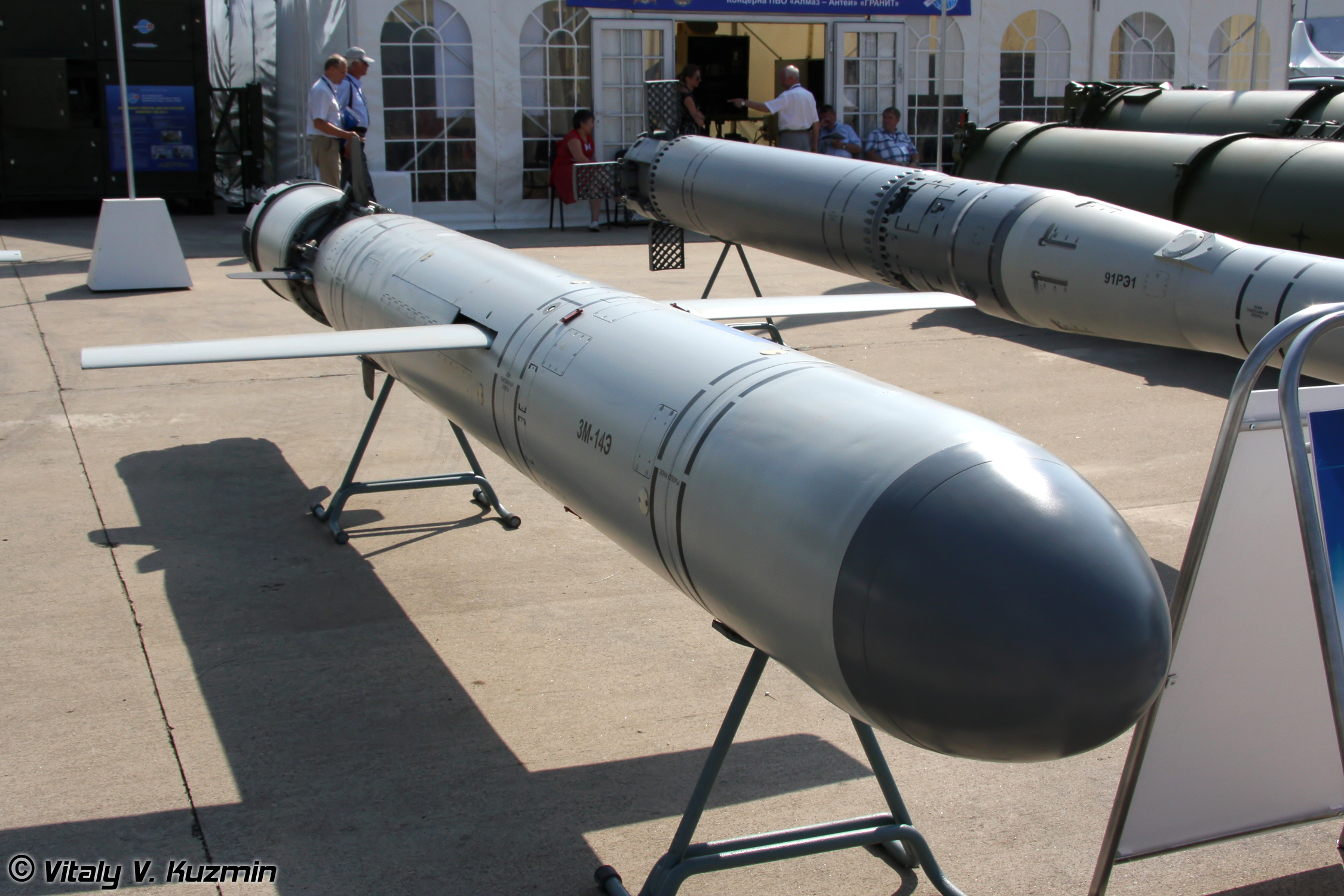

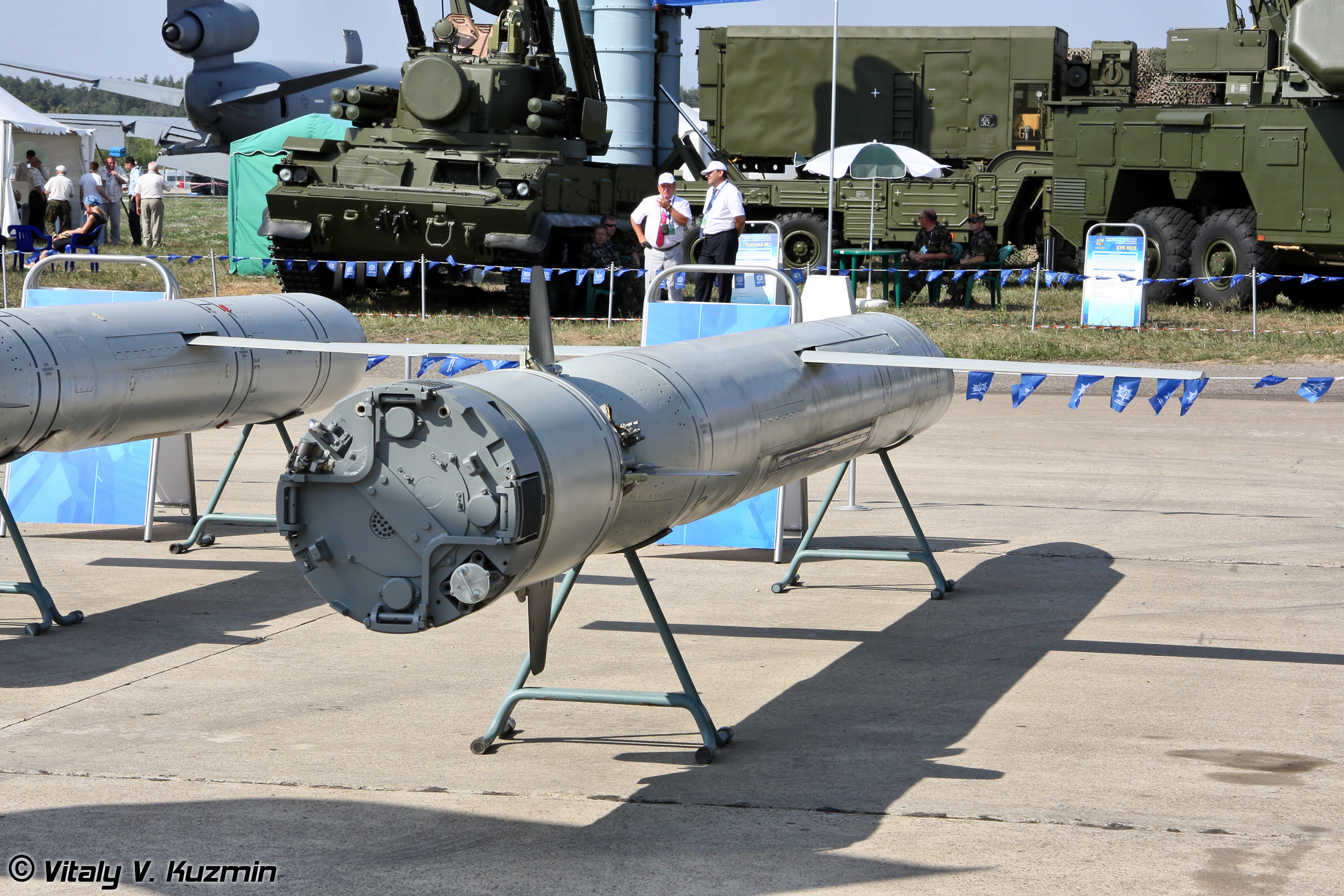

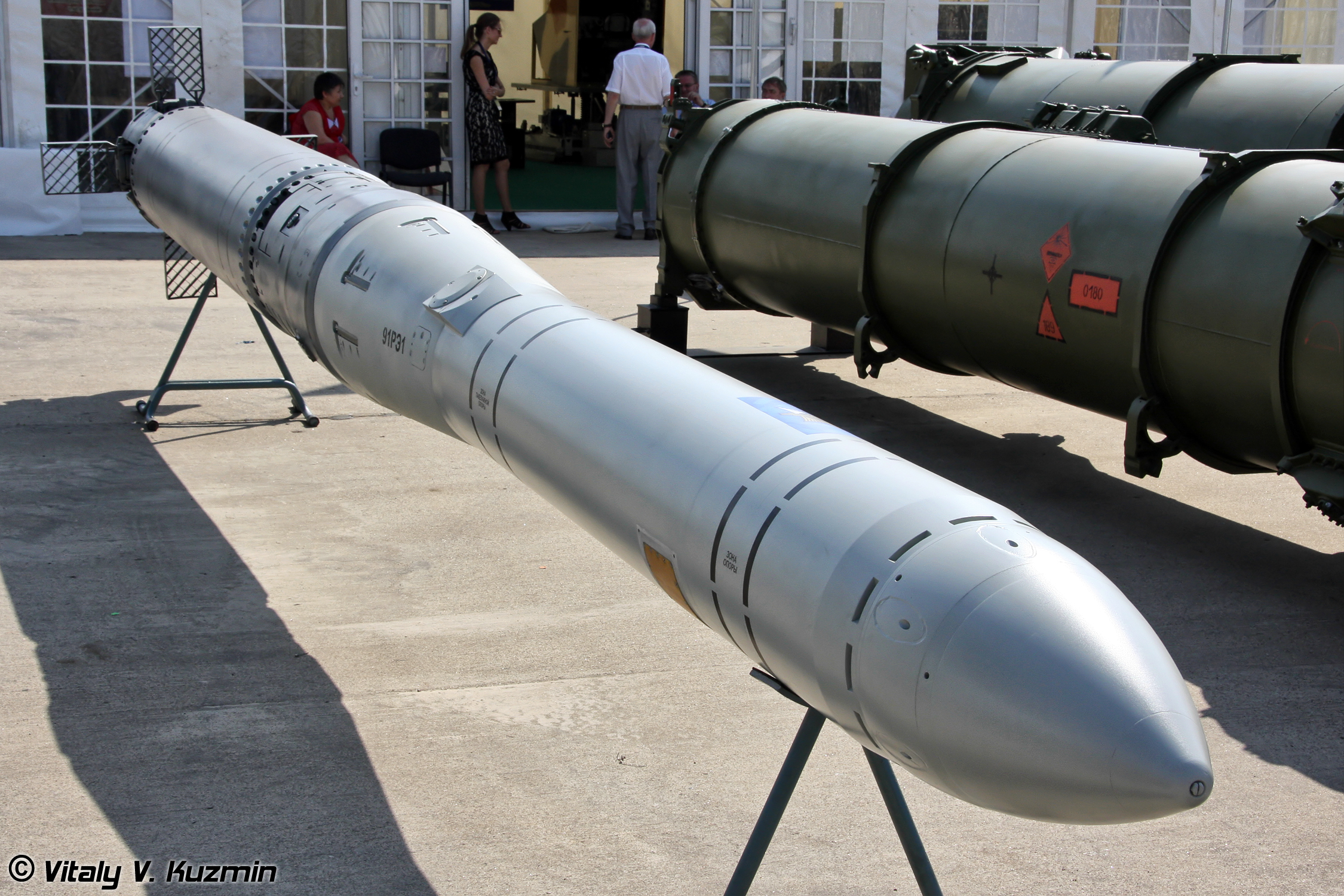

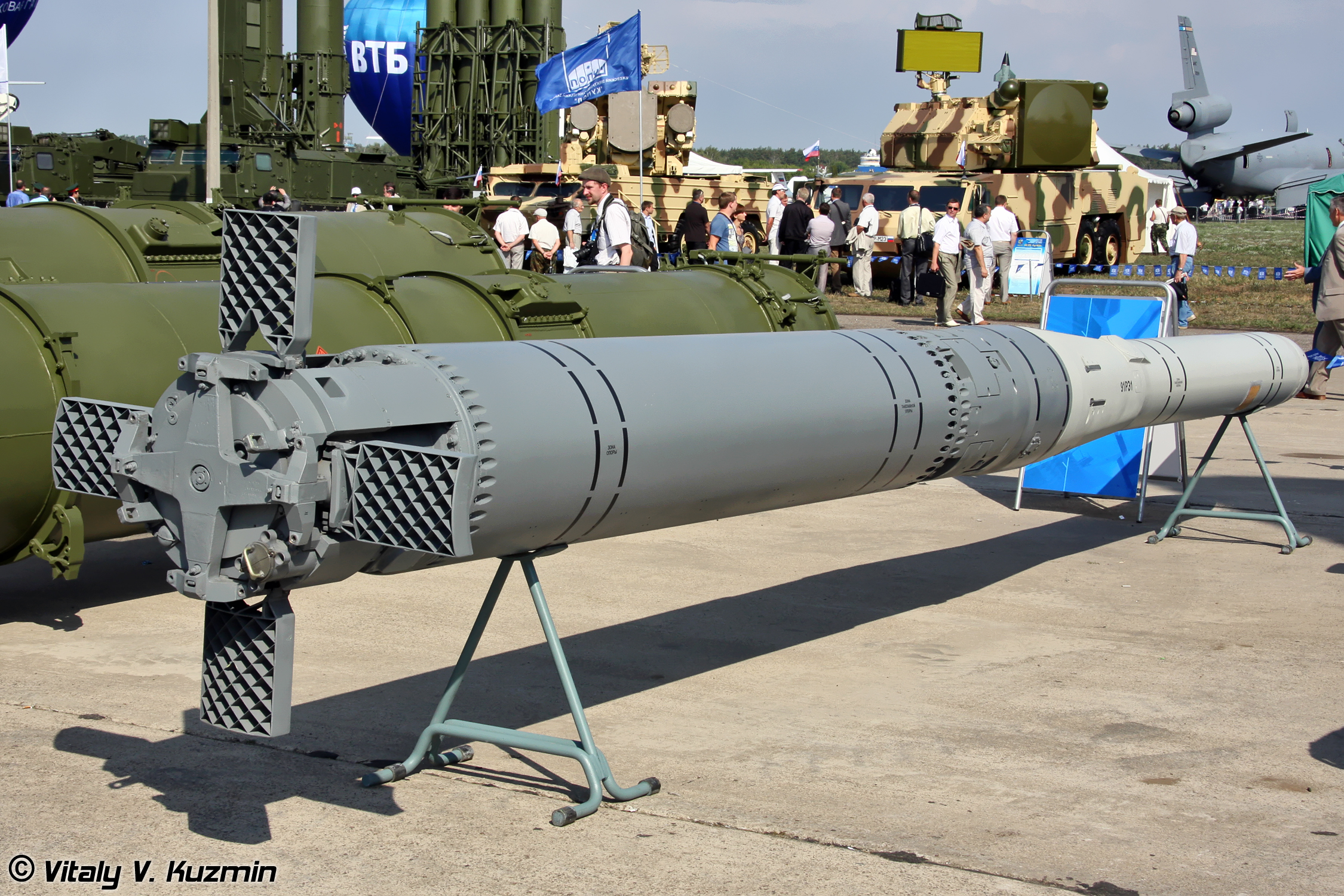

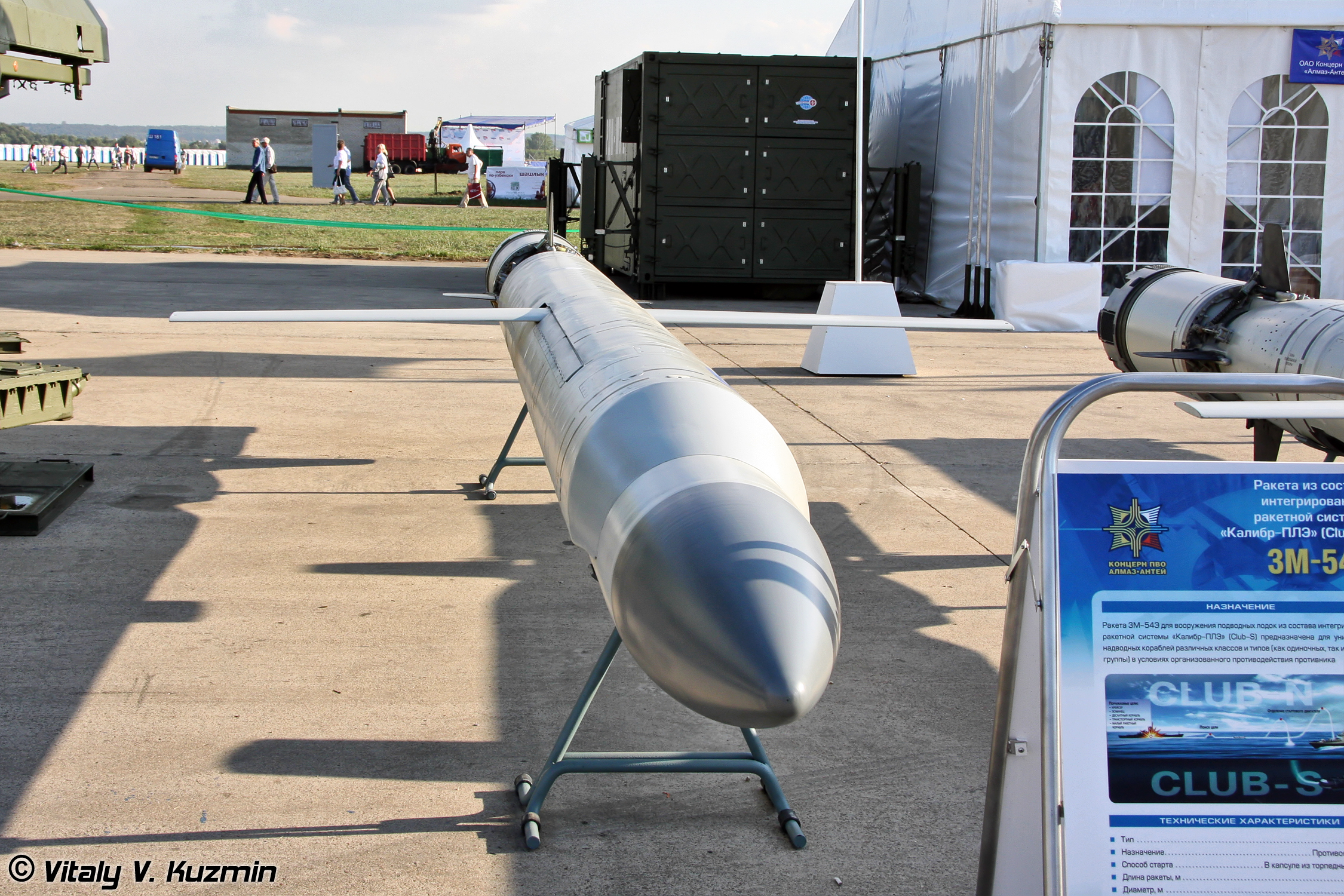

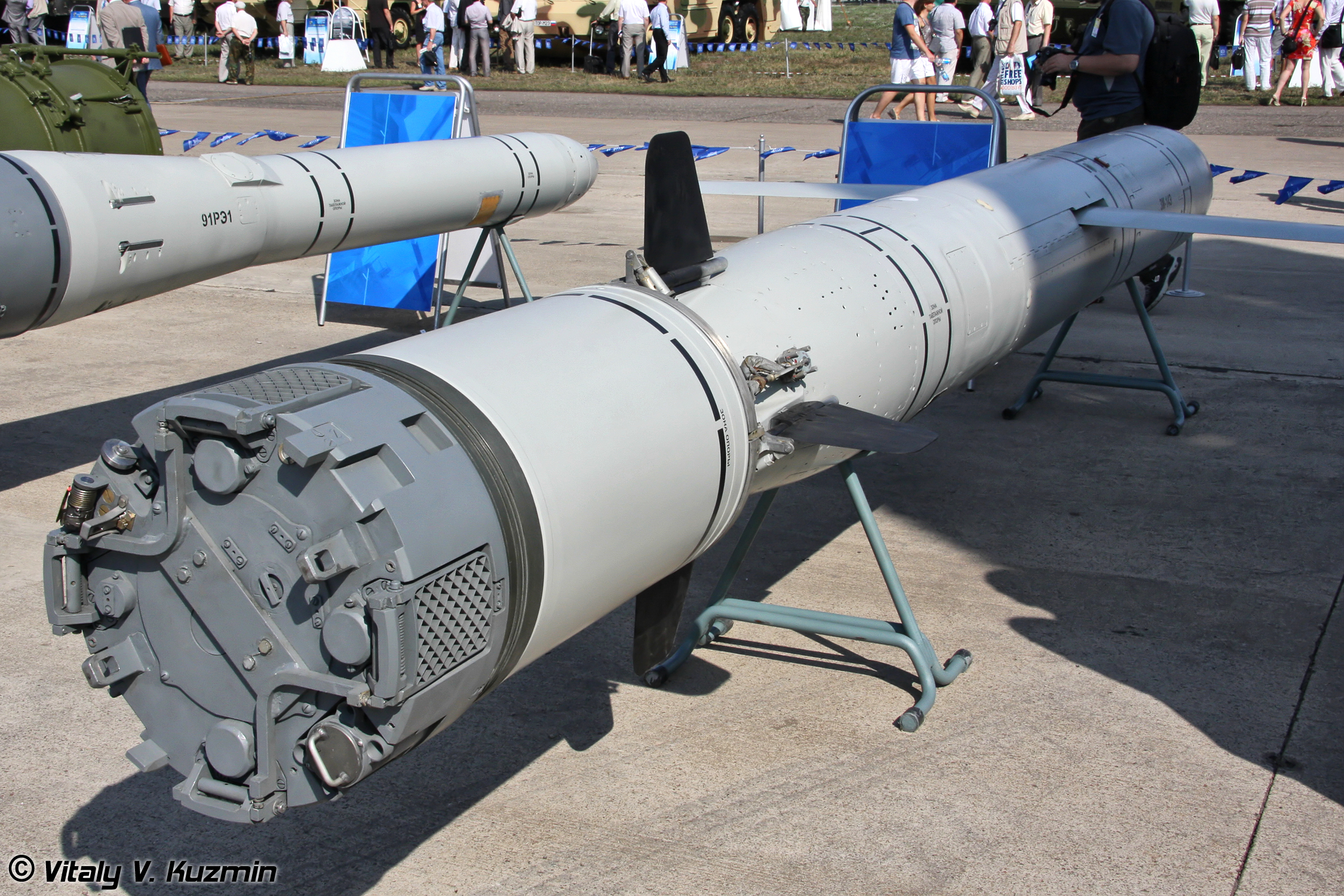

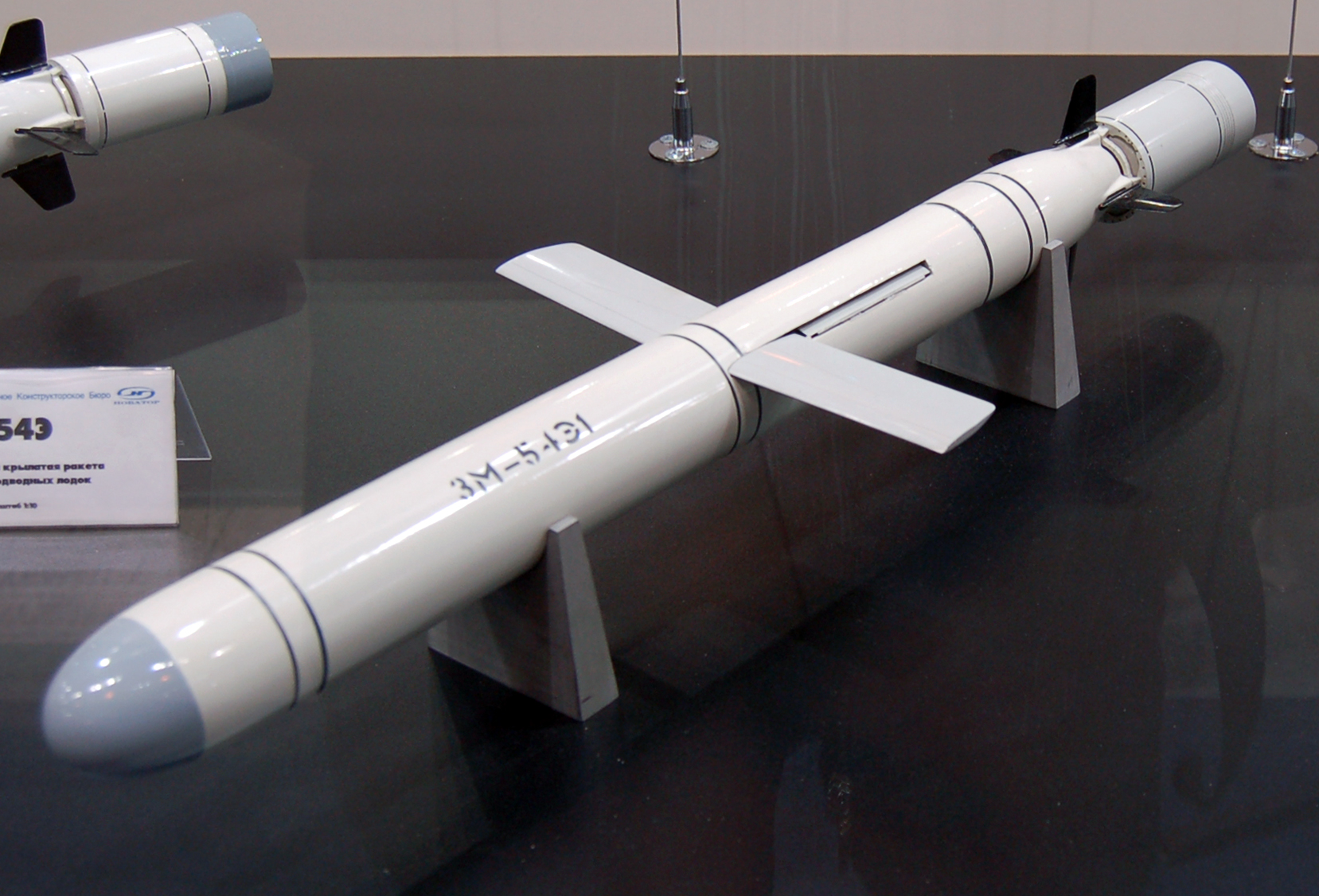

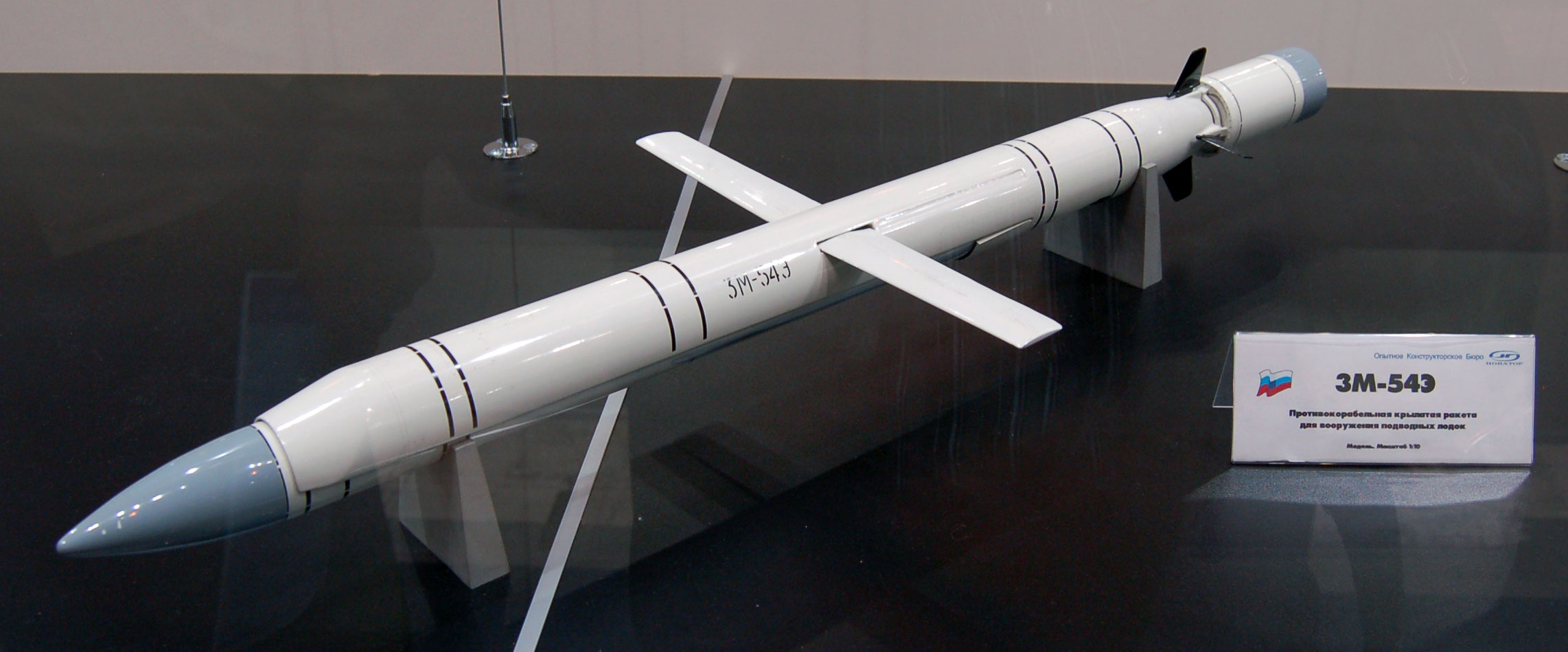

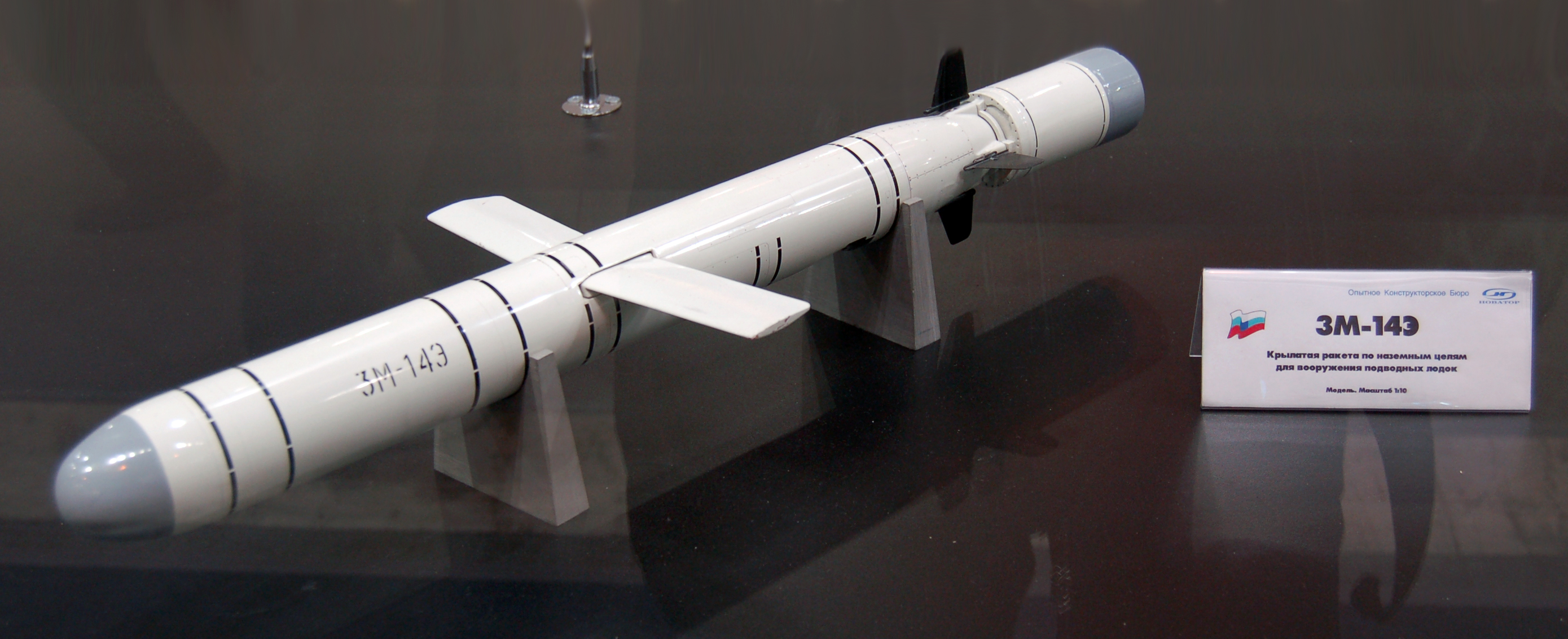

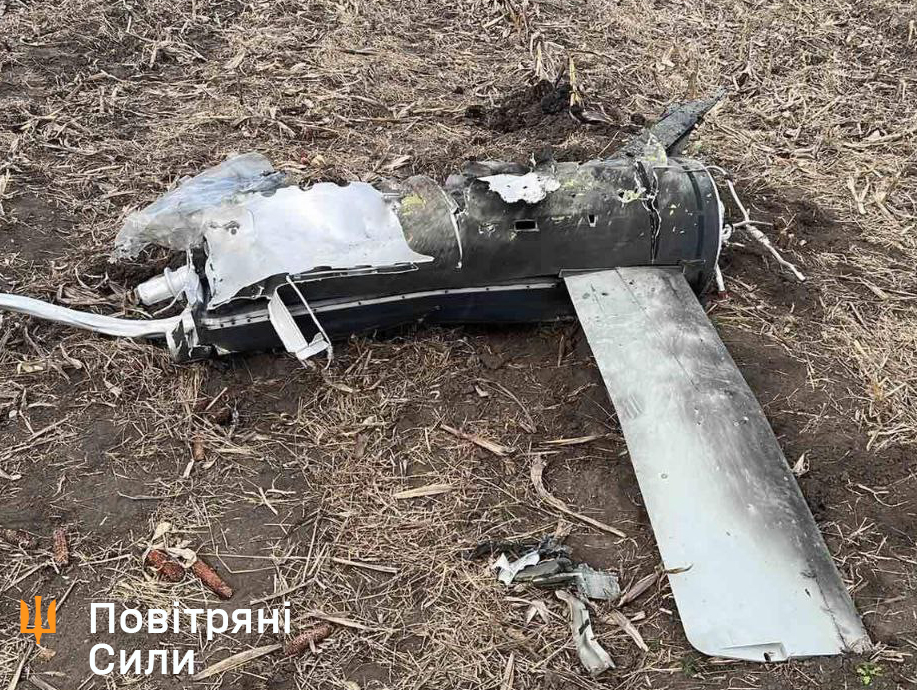

=== Domestic variants ===
| Name | Length | Warhead | Range | Launch platform | Target type | User | Notes | Ref. |
|---|---|---|---|---|---|---|---|---|
| 3M54K | 8.22 m (27.0 ft) | 200 kg (440 lb) | 550–660 km (340–410 mi) | Submarine | Surface ship | Russian Navy | | |
| 3M54T | 8.9 m (29 ft) | 200 kg (440 lb) | 550–660 km (340–410 mi) | Surface ship | Surface ship | Russian Navy | VLS-launched; Thrust vectoring booster | |
| 3M14K (SS-N-30A) | 6.2 m (20 ft) | 450 kg (990 lb) | 2,500 km (1,600 mi) | Submarine | Land | Russian Navy | Mach 0.8; inertial guidance | |
| 3M14T | 8.9 m (29 ft) | 450 kg (990 lb) | 2,500 km (1,600 mi) | Surface ship | Land | Russian Navy | VLS-launched; Thrust vectoring booster | |
| 91R1 | | | | Submarine | Submarine | Russian Navy | Carries APR-3M anti-submarine torpedo warhead Part of Otvet complex | |
| 91RT | | | | Surface ship | Submarine | Russian Navy | Carries MPT-UM homing torpedo warhead Part of Otvet complex | |
| Kalibr-M | | | 4,500 km (2,800 mi) | ship, submarine, air, and land-launched | | Russian Navy | Under development | |

=== Export variants ===
| Name | Length | Warhead | Range | Launch platform | Target type | Notes | Ref. |
|---|---|---|---|---|---|---|---|
Club-S
| 3M-54E | 6.2 m (20 ft) | 200 kg (440 lb) | 300 km (190 mi) | Submarine | Surface ship | | |
| 3M-54E1 | 6.2 m (20 ft) | 200 kg (440 lb) | 300 km (190 mi) | Submarine | Surface ship | Sea-skimming; Terminal speed: Mach 0.8 | |
| 3M-14E | 6.2 m (20 ft) | 450 kg (990 lb) | 300 km (190 mi) | Submarine | Land | | |
| 91RE1 | | | | | | | |
Club-N
| 3M-54TE | 8.9 m (29 ft) | 200 kg (440 lb) | 300 km (190 mi) | Surface ship | Surface ship | Thrust vectoring booster | |
| 3M-54TE1 | 8.9 m (29 ft) | 200 kg (440 lb) | 300 km (190 mi) | Surface ship | Surface ship | Sea-skimming; Terminal speed: Mach 0.8; Thrust vectoring booster | |
| 3M-14TE | 8.9 m (29 ft) | 450 kg (990 lb) | 300 km (190 mi) | Surface ship | Land | inertial guidance; Thrust vectoring booster | |
| 91RE2 | | | | | | | |
Club-T
| 3M-54E2 | | 450 kg (990 lb) | | Land | Surface ship | Weight: 1,700 kg (3,700 lb); CEP: 50 m (160 ft); Cruise speed: 240 m/s (Mach 0.71) | |
| 3M-14E1 | | 450 kg (990 lb) | | Land | Land | Weight: 1,700 kg (3,700 lb); CEP: 50 m (160 ft); Cruise speed: 240 m/s (Mach 0.71) | |
Club-A
| 3M-54AE | | 200 kg (440 lb) | 300 km (190 mi) | Air-launched | Surface ship | | |
| 3M-54AE1 | | 200 kg (440 lb) | 300 km (190 mi) | Air-launched | Surface ship | | |
| 3M-14AE | 6.2 m (20 ft) | 450 kg (990 lb) | 300 km (190 mi) | Air-launched | Land | Weight: 1,400 kg (3,100 lb); Inertial navigation system; Satellite navigation | |

== Operators ==
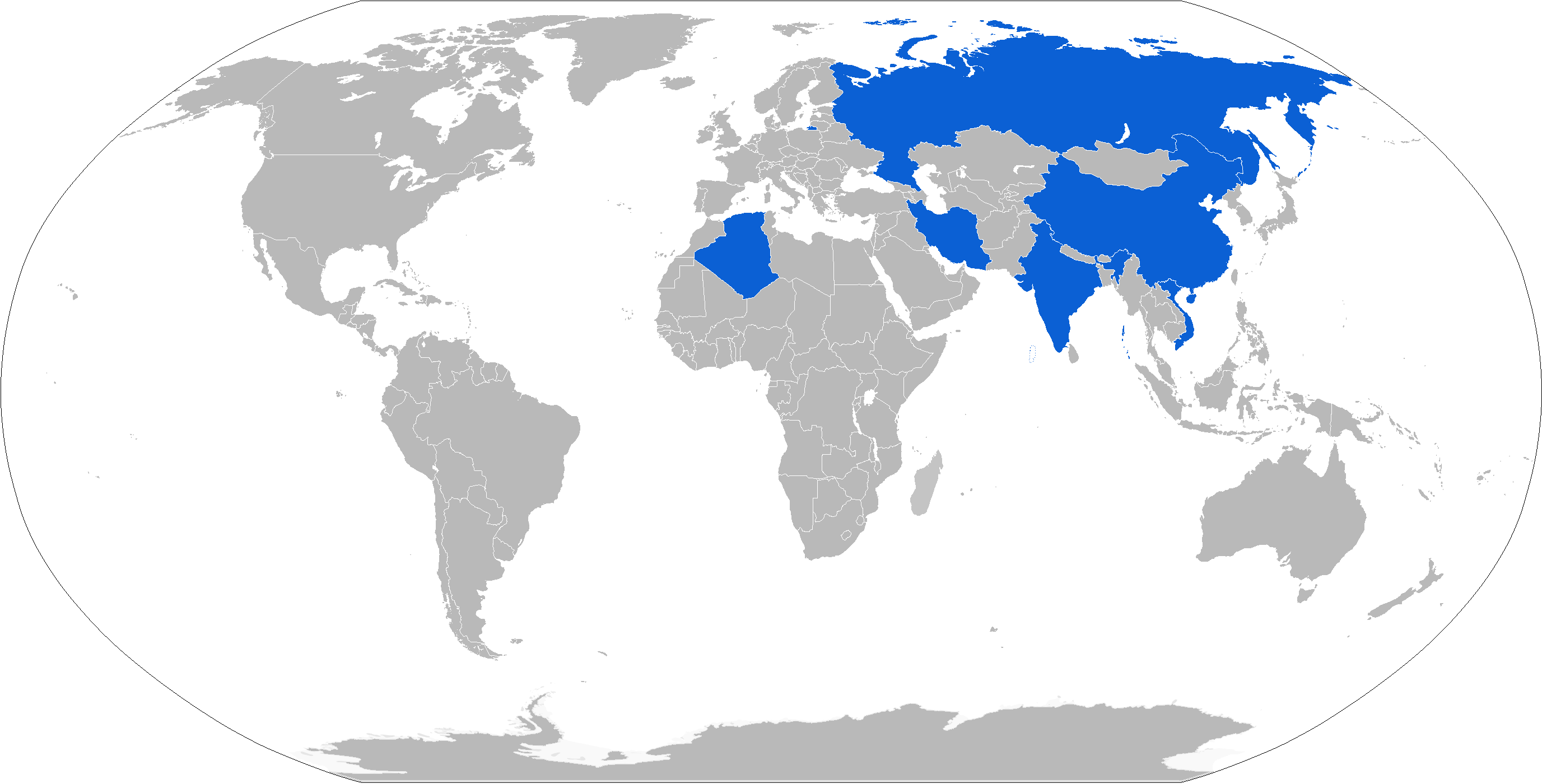
Map of Kalibr operators

- Russia:
  - Russian Navy uses the 3M14, 3M54, 3M54-1, 91R1, 91RT2. Submarine-launched variants (entered service in 2016) are used by Kilo-class submarine, Lada-class submarine, Akula-class submarine, Oscar II-class submarine and the Yasen-class submarine. Surface ship launched variants are used by the Gremyashchy class, Karakurt class, Buyan-M class corvettes, Gepard class, Admiral Gorshkov class and the Admiral Grigorovich-class frigates. According to classified documents, Russia signed two large contracts for the supply of 240 missiles between 2022 and 2024 and 450 missiles between 2025 and 2026. Also, 56 3M-14S missiles with a special nuclear warhead are ordered.
- Algeria: The Algerian National Navy uses the 'Club-S' variant for their Kilo class submarines.
- India: The Indian Navy uses both 'Club-S' and 'Club-N' variants for the Kilo class submarines (known as the Sindhughosh-class submarine in Indian service), the Talwar class frigates respectively.
- Vietnam: The Vietnam People's Navy uses the 'Club-S' variant for its six Kilo class submarines.
- China: The People's Liberation Army Navy uses the 'Club-S' variant for its Kilo class submarines.
- Iran: Contradictory sources indicate that the Iranian Navy is thought to have purchased or is about to purchase 'Club-S' missiles for its three Kilo class submarines.

== See also ==
- 3M-51 Alfa – (Russia)
- Atmaca – (Turkey)
- AV-TM 300 – (Brazil)
- Babur – (Pakistan)
- BGM-109 Tomahawk – (United States)
- Hyunmoo-3 – (South Korea)
- Iskander-K – (Russia)
- NASM-MR – (India)
- Noor ASCM – (Iran)
- Otvet – (Russia)
- Qader – (Iran)
- RK-55 – (Soviet Union)
- YJ-18 – (China)
