= NPO Novator =

Russian company that designs long-range anti-aircraft missiles

Novator Design Bureau
- Formerly: OKB-8
- Type: Joint-stock company
- Industry: Defense
- Founded: 1947
- Headquarters: Yekaterinburg, Russia
- Key people: Paul Kamneva
- Products: Anti-aircraft defence systems, Missiles, Cruise missiles, Anti-ballistic missiles
- Parent: Almaz-Antey
- Website: okb-novator.ru

NPO Novator (Novator Design Bureau, OKB Novator, OKB Lyulyev; Russian: Опытное конструкторское бюро «Новатор» им. Люльева Л. В.) is a Russian company that designs long-range anti-aircraft missiles. It was established in 1947 as OKB-8 in Sverdlovsk, became independent in 1991, and then became part of the Almaz-Antey conglomerate. It is perhaps best known for designing the 9M82 and 9M83 missiles of the S-300V (SA-12 'Gladiator') SAM system.

== History ==
The Kalinin Machine-Building Plant (now JSC MZiK) was a major part of the Soviet war effort in World War II, producing 20,000 anti-aircraft guns. After the war ended, Lev Lyulyev was promoted to Chief Designer of Factory No. 8 and he started work on heavy guns such as the KS-19 and KS-30. In 1947 he formed the Chief Designer Bureau (OGK) - later Experimental Design Bureau (OKB)-8 - of the Ministry of Aviation Industry, for the development of heavy anti-aircraft guns. As was the Soviet tradition, the OKB was often referred to by his name. In 1957 he switched to surface-to-air missiles (SAMs).

Lyulyev died on 1 November 1985. OKB-8 became independent from the factory in 1991, but maintains a relationship with the factory. After the end of the Cold War, they set up the Novator Production-Commercial Bureau as a defence conversion enterprise to fund the work of the Design Bureau, but the company struggled financially throughout the 1990s. On 20 March 1996 General Designer Valentin Smirnov was murdered, possibly as a result of discovering fraud in the company.

In 2001 Novator was amalgamated with other companies involved in SAM production, into the Almaz-Antey. In 2004 it signed a deal with India's Defence Research and Development Organisation to develop the K-100 "AWACS killer" missile.

In 2017 US has announced licensing and export restrictions on Novator, charging it with producing the cruise missile prohibited by the 1987 Intermediate-Range Nuclear Forces Treaty. Novator and its parent company, Almaz-Antey, are in the list of sanctioned entities under the EU's 'fourth package' of restrictive measures, announced 15 March 2022.

== Products ==
=== Anti-aircraft guns ===
- 1957 - KN-52 zenith gun

=== Surface-to-air missiles ===
Dates given are when missiles entered operational service with the Russian armed forces.

- 1969 - 3M8 (later 9M8) ramjet-powered missile, part of the 2K11 Krug (NATO reporting name SA-4 'Ganef') SAM system with a range of 55 km (30 nmi).
- 1980 - 9M38 for the Buk missile system (SA-11 'Gadfly'), range 35 km (19 nmi), followed by the 9M38M1 and 9M38M2
- 1984 - 9M82 (40 km range, 'Gladiator') and 9M83 (100 km range plus ABM defence, 'Giant') missiles for the S-300V (SA-12 "Gladiator") army SAM that replaced the SA-4.
- 1995 - 53T6, SH-08, (ABM-3 'Gazelle') endoatmospheric interceptor missiles for the A-135 anti-ballistic missile system (ABM-3) defending Moscow.
- ~2017 - 9M82MD, 400 km-range hypersonic missile for S-300VM system, not presently operational.

=== Anti-submarine missiles ===
OKB-8 was the USSR's sole developer of warheads delivered by ASW missiles such as the RPK-2 Viyuga (SS-N-15 'Starfish') and RPK-6 Vodopad (SS-N-16 'Stallion')

- 1969 - 81R RPK-2 Vyuga (SS-N-15)
- 1980 - RU-90 Vyuga 5 kt nuclear depth charge (SS-N-15)
- 1981 - RU-100 Vodopod HE torpedo (SS-N-16A)
- 1984 - RU-100 Veter nuclear depth charge (SS-N-16B)

=== Sub-launched cruise missiles ===
- 1984 - 3M10/RK-55 Granat (SS-N-21 'Sampson'), a version of the Raduga Kh-55 cruise missile launched from submarines.

=== Air-to-air missiles ===
- 2015? - K-100 "AWACS killer" with a range of 200–400 km is currently under joint development with India. May be based on the 9M38 airframe, previous names include Izdeliye 172 ('Article 172'), AAM-L (RVV-L), KS-172, KS-1, 172S-1 and R-172.

=== Surface-to-surface missile systems ===
In April 2010, Jane's Defence Weekly reported the development of the Club-K containerised version of the Club cruise missile family, with either four of Novator's anti-ship missiles or land-attack missiles in a 40 ft shipping container. The missiles are revealed when the Universal Launch Module (erector) tilts up to the vertical. The containers can be carried on ships, trains and road haulage trucks.

In December 2017 it was revealed that Novator's new product the 9M729 cruise missile was believed by the US National Security Council to be in violation of the 1987 Intermediate-range Nuclear Forces treaty.

=== Cruise missiles ===
- 3M-54 Klub
