= RK-55 =

Soviet surface and submarine-launched nuclear cruise missile

RK-55 Relief (NATO reporting name: SSC-X-4 'Slingshot') S-10 Granat (SS-N-21 'Sampson')
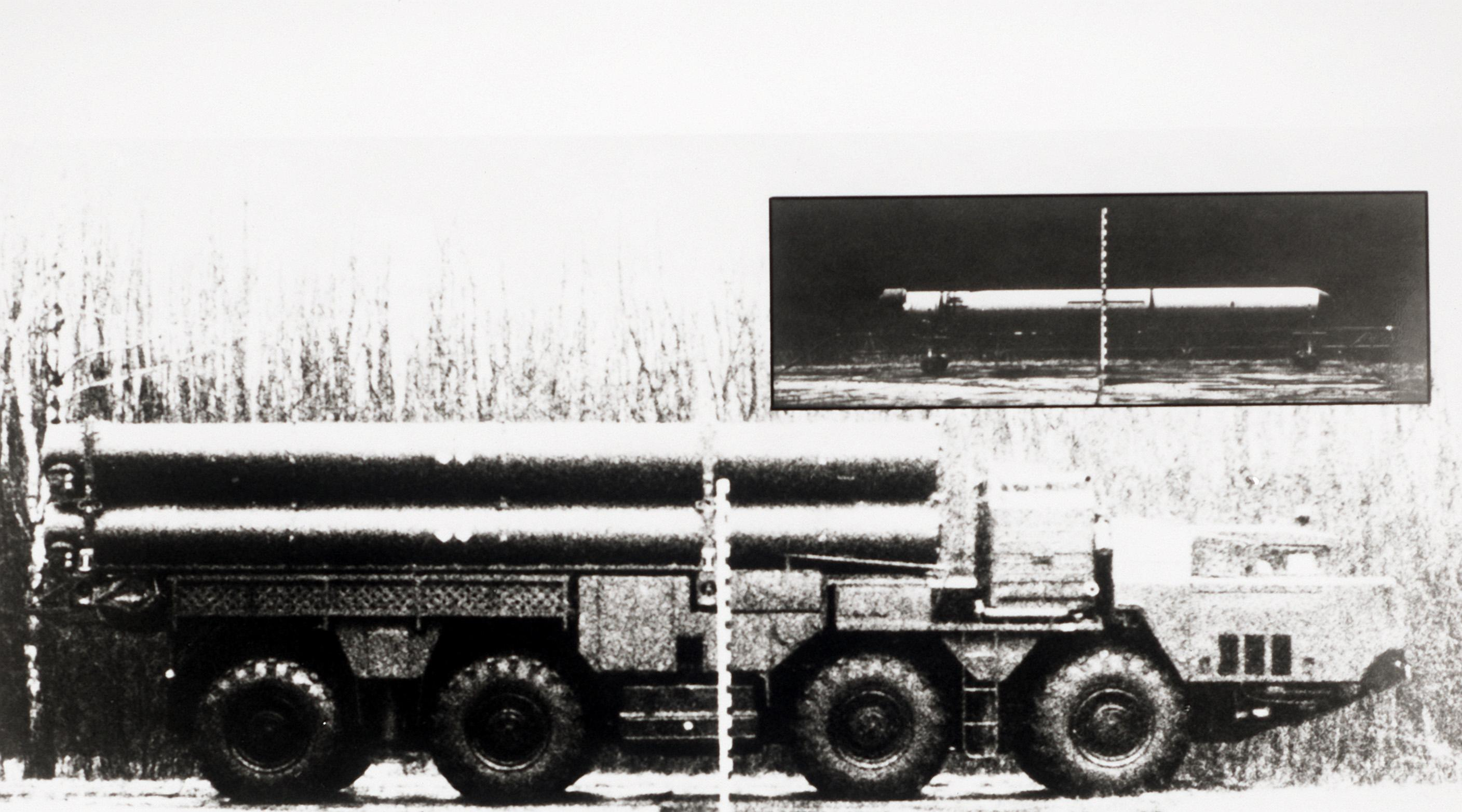
- RK-55 transporter erector launcher
- Type: surface/sub-launched nuclear cruise missile
- Place of origin: Soviet Union

Service history
- In service: since 1984
- Used by: Soviet Union / Russia

Production history
- Designer: L. V. Lyulev, Novator NPP Temp, Raduga
- Designed: 1975
- Manufacturer: Novator, NPP Temp, Raduga MKB, KhAZ (Kharkiv), others?
- Produced: 1976

Specifications
- Mass: 1,700 kg (3,750 lb)
- Length: 809 cm (26 ft 7 in)
- Diameter: 51 cm (20.1 in)
- Wingspan: 310 cm (122.0 in)
- Warhead: Conventional; Nuclear
- Blast yield: Nuclear 200kt
- Engine: Solid-propellant rocket booster + R-95-300 or 36MT-37 turbofan 450 kgf
- Operational range: 3,000 km (1,600 nmi)
- Maximum speed: 720 km/h (447.4 mph)
- Guidance system: Sprut inertial guidance plus TERCOM
- Launch platform: Akula, Sierra II, Victor III, Yankee Notch, and Yasen-class submarines, TEL

The Novator RK-55 Relief (Russian: РК-55 Рельеф, tr. 'Relief'; NATO: SSC-X-4 'Slingshot'; GRAU: 3K12) is a Russian Navy cruise missile that is launched either from submarines (SLCM) or from surface ships. It can have a nuclear warhead developed in the Soviet Union. A version launched from submarine torpedo tubes, the S-10 Granat (SS-N-21 'Sampson'; GRAU: 3K10), has apparently been converted to carry conventional warheads and continues in service to this day. The Russian Federation was reported to have deployed the derivative SS-CX-7/SS-CX-8 systems on 14 February 2017. The land launched version is called the Novator 9M729.

The RK-55 is very similar to the air-launched Kh-55 (AS-15 'Kent') but the Kh-55 has a drop-down turbofan engine and was designed by MKB Raduga. Both have formed the basis of post-Cold-War missiles, in particular the 3M-54 Kalibr which has a supersonic approach phase.

== Development ==
In the late 1960s, the "Ekho" study conducted by the GosNIIAS institute concluded that it would be more effective to deploy many small, subsonic cruise missiles than the much more expensive supersonic missiles then in favour. In 1971 Raduga began working on the air-launched Kh-55, which first flew in 1976. That same year, RK-55 first flew. NPO Novator would work on the submarine- and ground-launched versions. In 1993 Novator exhibited the Sizzler series weapons, which appears to be based on the RK-55. It is a two-stage design, which goes supersonic during its final approach to the target.

== Design ==
The S-10 is launched through 533 mm torpedo tubes.

== Operational history ==
Fewer than 100 RK-55s had been deployed by the end of 1988. The new Akula class was the first class to receive the new missile. It was later fitted on the Sierra I/II and Victor III classes and the new Yasen-class submarines.

Four Yankee-class submarines deployed in 1988 are of a design of particular note, replacing the missile compartment with additional torpedo tubes for 35-40 land attack cruise missiles. They were probably nuclear-tipped S-10s during the Cold War, and then converted to use conventional warheads after the START I treaty restricted sub-launched nuclear cruise missiles. The US Navy has done the same on a grander scale with the SSGN conversions of four Ohio-class submarines. It has been suggested that S-10's could in future be fitted to converted Delta-class submarines, or to surface ships, but these have not been confirmed.

== Variants ==
- RK-55 (SSC-X-4 'Slingshot') – ground-based version
- S-10 (SS-N-21 'Sampson') – submarine-launched version
- 9M728 and 9M729 (SSC-7 and SSC-8 'Screwdriver') – ground-based version, assessed range 480–5,500 km (300–3,420 mi), nuclear capable

Conventional unitary High Explosive (HE) warhead and submunition warhead versions of the RK-55 have probably been developed, to justify the continuing service of the submarines that carry them.

== Operators ==
- Russia

=== Former ===
- Soviet Union
- Belarus
- Ukraine

=== Derivatives ===
- India
- Iran
- North Korea
- China
- Pakistan
- Ukraine Korshun (Luch Artem - KhAZ - Vizar ZhMZ - Yuzhnoe Pivdenmash) with MS400 (Ivchenko Progres Motor Sich) engine.

== Similar weapons ==
- Ground Launched Cruise Missile (BGM-109G Gryphon) - land-based Tomahawk with tactical nuclear warhead of 10-50 kt and 2000–2500 km range
- Pershing 1b and Pershing II RR - 740 km range ballistic missile also in testing at the time of the INF Treaty.
- Raduga Kh-55 - originally thought in the West to be an air-launched version of the RK-55, now has tactical versions such as the Kh-555 and the stealthy Kh-101.
- UGM-109 Tomahawk - the Capsule Launch System allows Tomahawks to be fired from torpedo tubes or dedicated submarine launch tubes

== See also ==
- Intermediate-range ballistic missile
